= Kigulu Cultural Museum =

Community museum in Uganda

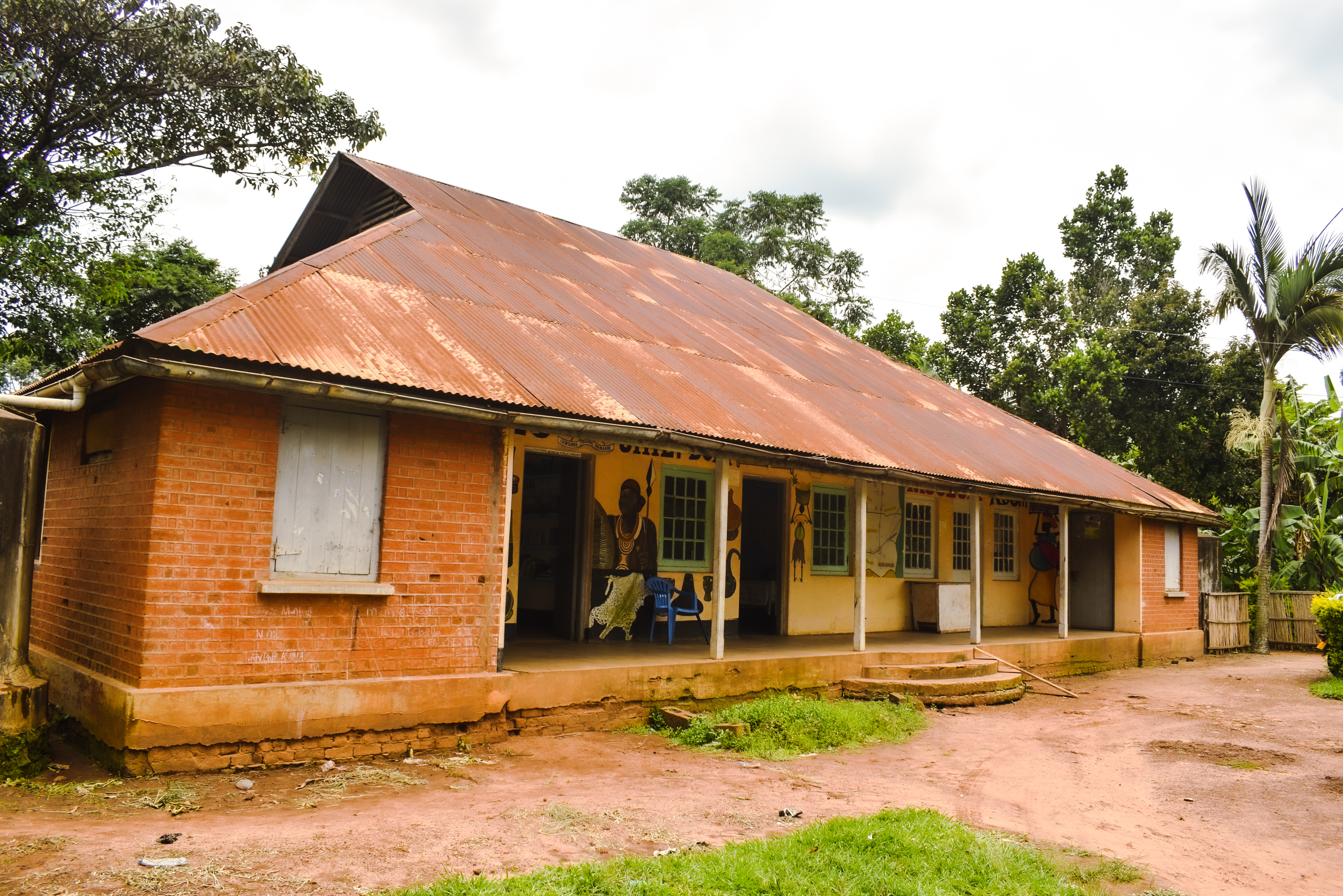
- Exterior view of Kigulu Cultural Museum

- Location of Kigulu Cultural Museum in Uganda
- Location: Bulubandi, Nakigo Road, Iganga Municipality, Eastern Uganda
- Coordinates: 0.602342°N 33.48613°E
- Type: Community museum
- Director: Prince Ibrahim Kitaulwa
- Owner: Kigulu Chiefdom / Uganda Community Museums Association

Kigulu Cultural Museum also known as Kigulu Cultural Museum-Iganga or Kigulu Chiefdom Cultural Museum is a Ugandan community museum located in Bulubandi, along Nakigo Road, in Iganga municipality eastern Uganda.

The museum was founded by members of the Kigulu royal family including Prince Ibrahim Kitaulwa who currently serves as the chairperson of Uganda Community Museums Association (UCOMA). It was founded to preserve and promote the cultural heritage of the Basoga in Kigulu chiefdom of the 11 chiefdoms of Busoga Kingdom.

== History ==
The museum is in an old building that once belonged to the Chief of Kigulu. The Kigulu royal family started and still runs the museum. Inside, you can see how people traditionally worshipped, local foods and medicines, royal items, crafts, and stories from the Basoga culture.

The museum's main goal is to teach young people about their culture and fight the loss of traditions caused by modern life, poor education, and outside influence. In 2023, the museum finished a research report and guide on local cultural stuff to help young Basoga people learn about cultural practices, ceremonies, and family histories that are fading away.

== Collections ==
- The 'Ikonero,' a classic four-legged wooden stool, stands for power in Basoga culture.
- See items that show how Basoga society worked, like royal items, farm tools, cooking gear, and hunting tools.
- Display of oral literature, clan history, coming-of-age events, and wedding traditions.

== See also ==
- Uganda Museum
- Uganda National Cultural Centre
- Ssemagulu Royal Museum
- Ateker Cultural Centre
- St. Luke Community Museum
- Madi Community Museum
- Uganda Railway Museum
