= Madi Community Museum =

Community museum in Uganda

- MCM
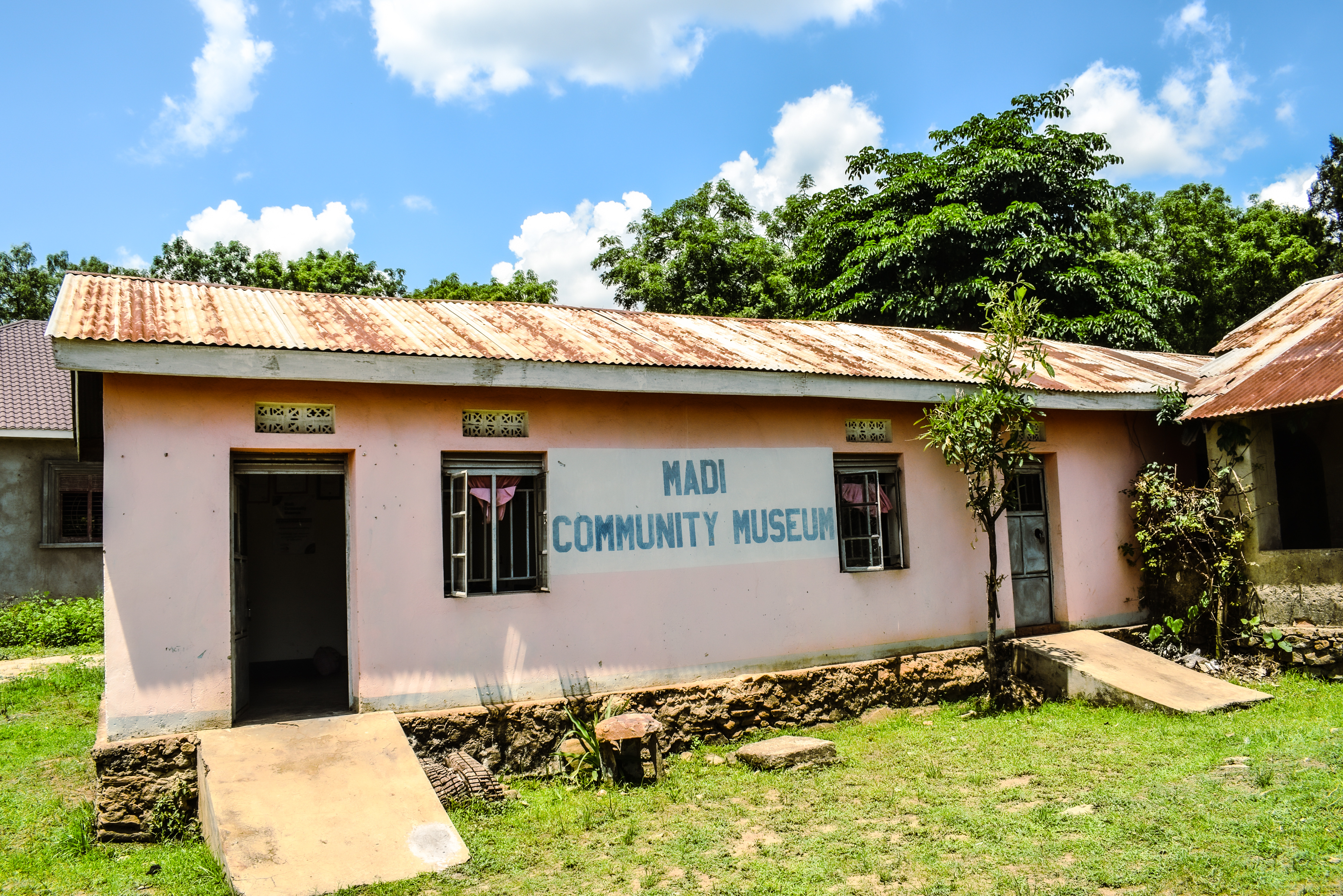
- Madi Community Museum, Metu Subcounty, Moyo District, Uganda

- Location in Uganda
- Established: 2014
- Location: Metu Trading Centre, Moyo District, West Nile Sub-region, Uganda
- Coordinates: 3°40′1.88″N 31°47′17.30″E
- Type: Community museum
- Founder: Cross-Cultural Foundation of Uganda
- Director: Managed by a local community committee

Madi Community Museum also known as MCM or Madi Lugbara Cultural Foundation Museum is a community museum located in the Metu trading center in Moyo District, West Nile Sub-region, Uganda. It was established in 2014 to collect, document, and preserve the cultural heritage of the Madi people and promote cultural tourism in the region.

== History ==
The Museum was founded in 2014 with support from Cross-Cultural Foundation of Uganda and it is housed in Metu Court Hall a building which was originally constructed by the British colonial government in 10 November 1953 by Sir Andrew Cohen. Since its inception, the museum has been run as a community-based organization (CBO). A local committee manages it, with backing from community elders, cultural figures, and volunteers. This effort was part of a bigger push in Uganda to set up community museums in rural spots.

== Collections ==
The museum has collections from the Madi people, showing how they lived, what they believed, and what they did. The items include instruments, things they used around the house, hunting equipment, and clothes for special events like O’di, or bow-lyre. These are significant to the Madi, both culturally and spiritually. The O’di, or bow-lyre is played it at weddings, funerals, when they're telling stories, celebrating the harvest, and even when they're trying to sort out disagreements. UNESCO even gave it a shout-out in 2016 as something really special and important.

== Gallery ==
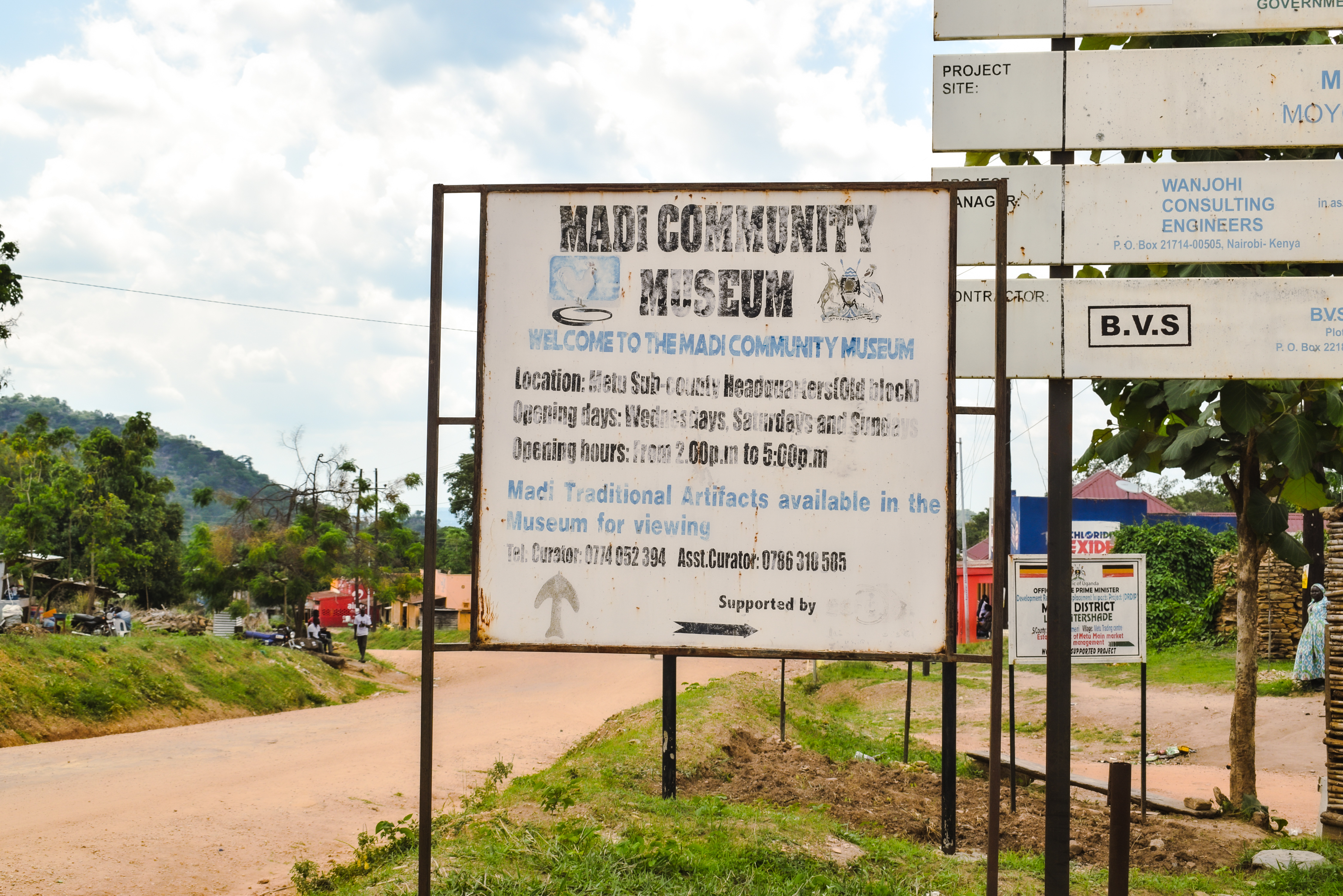
Signpost for Madi Community Museum, Metu Subcounty, Moyo District

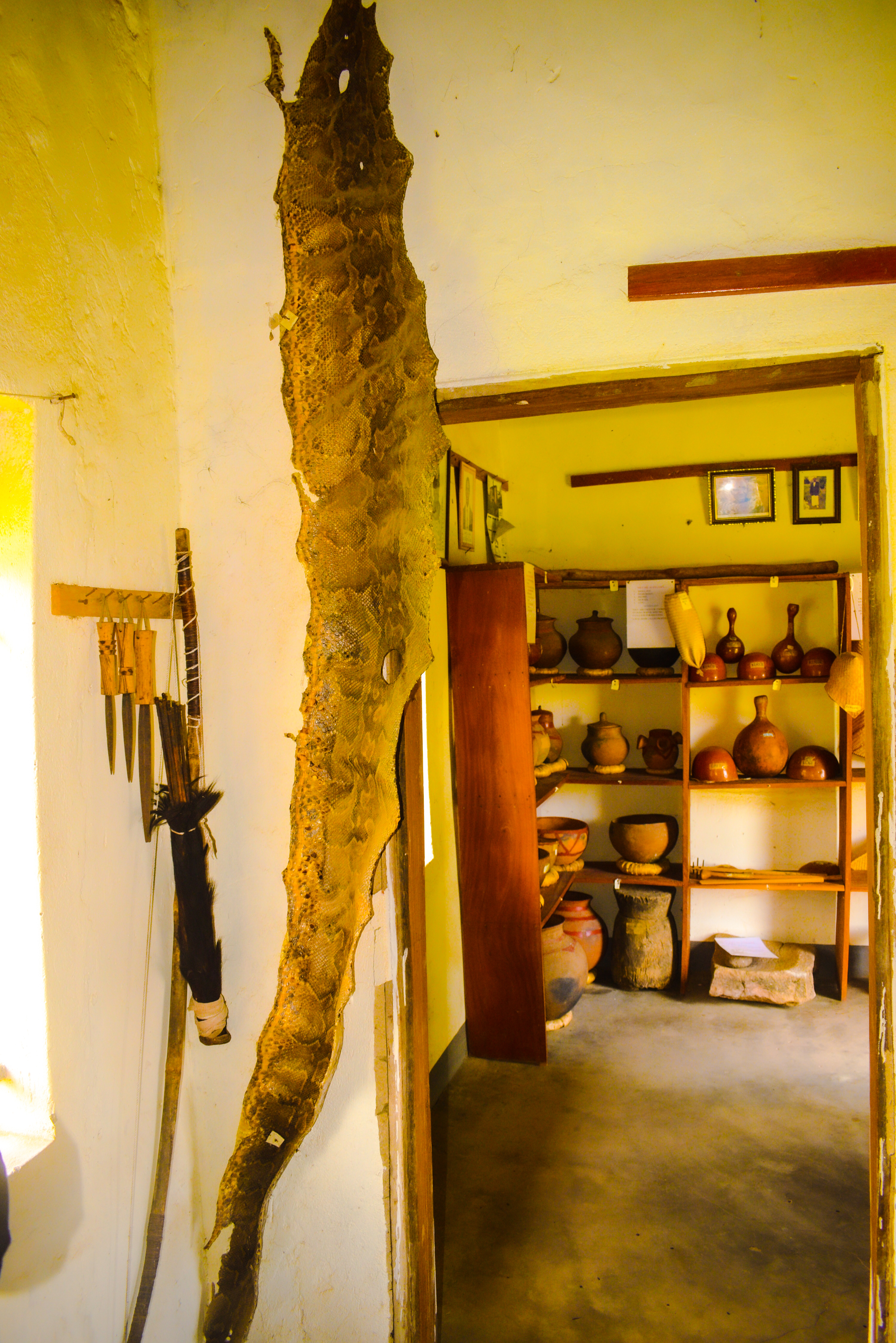
Python skin at Madi Community Museum

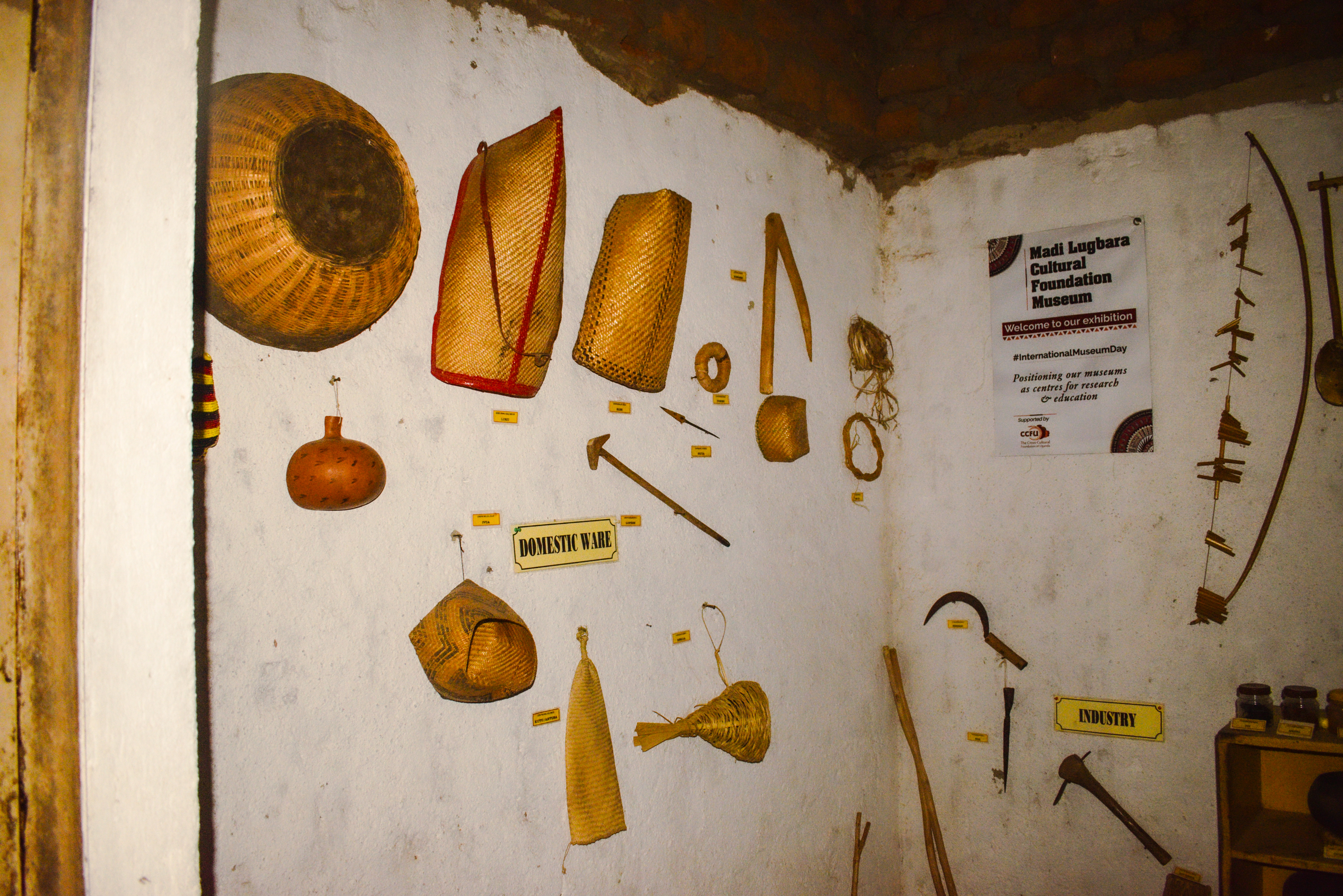
Interior of Madi Lugbara Cultural Foundation Museum

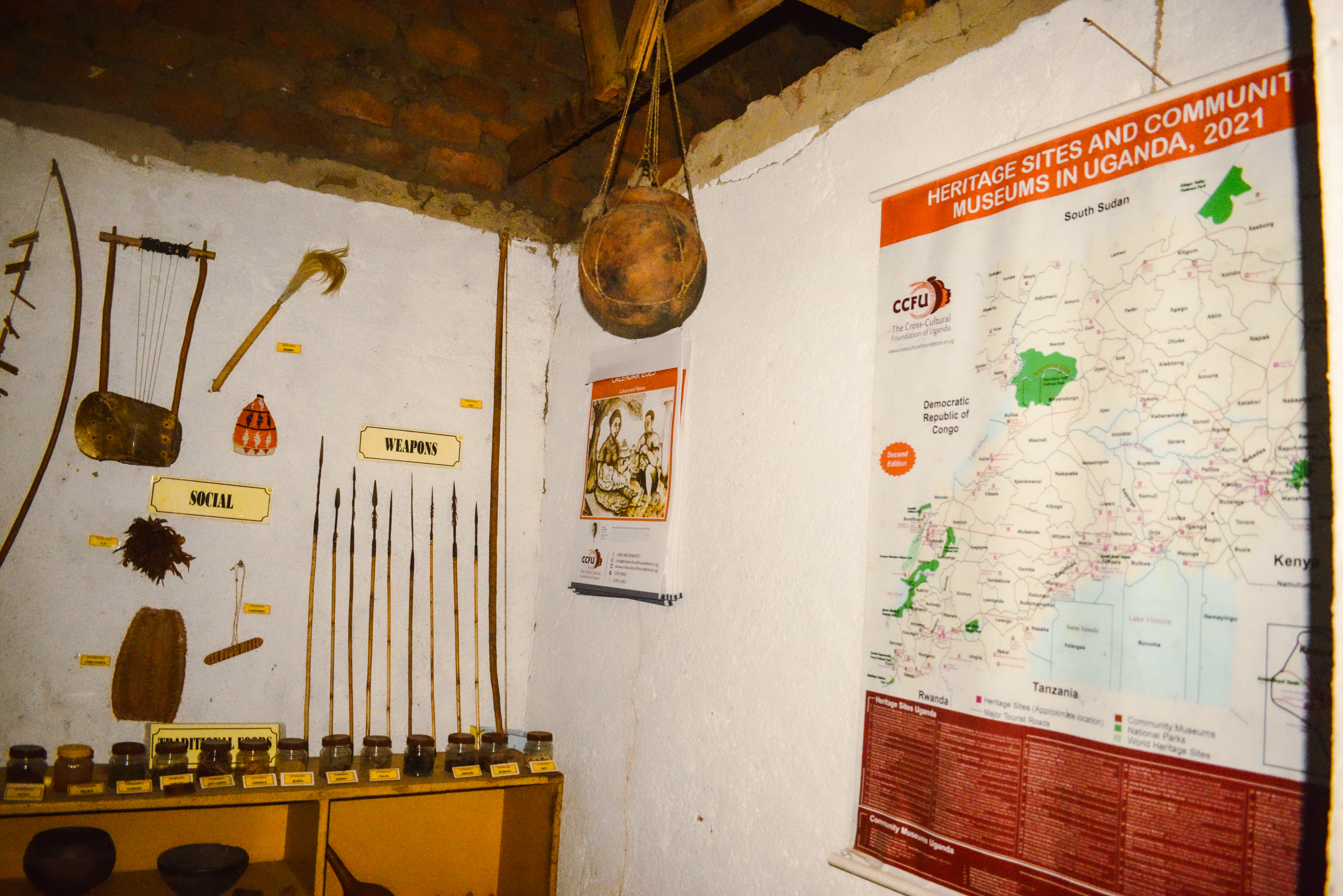
Another interior view of Madi Lugbara Cultural Foundation Museum

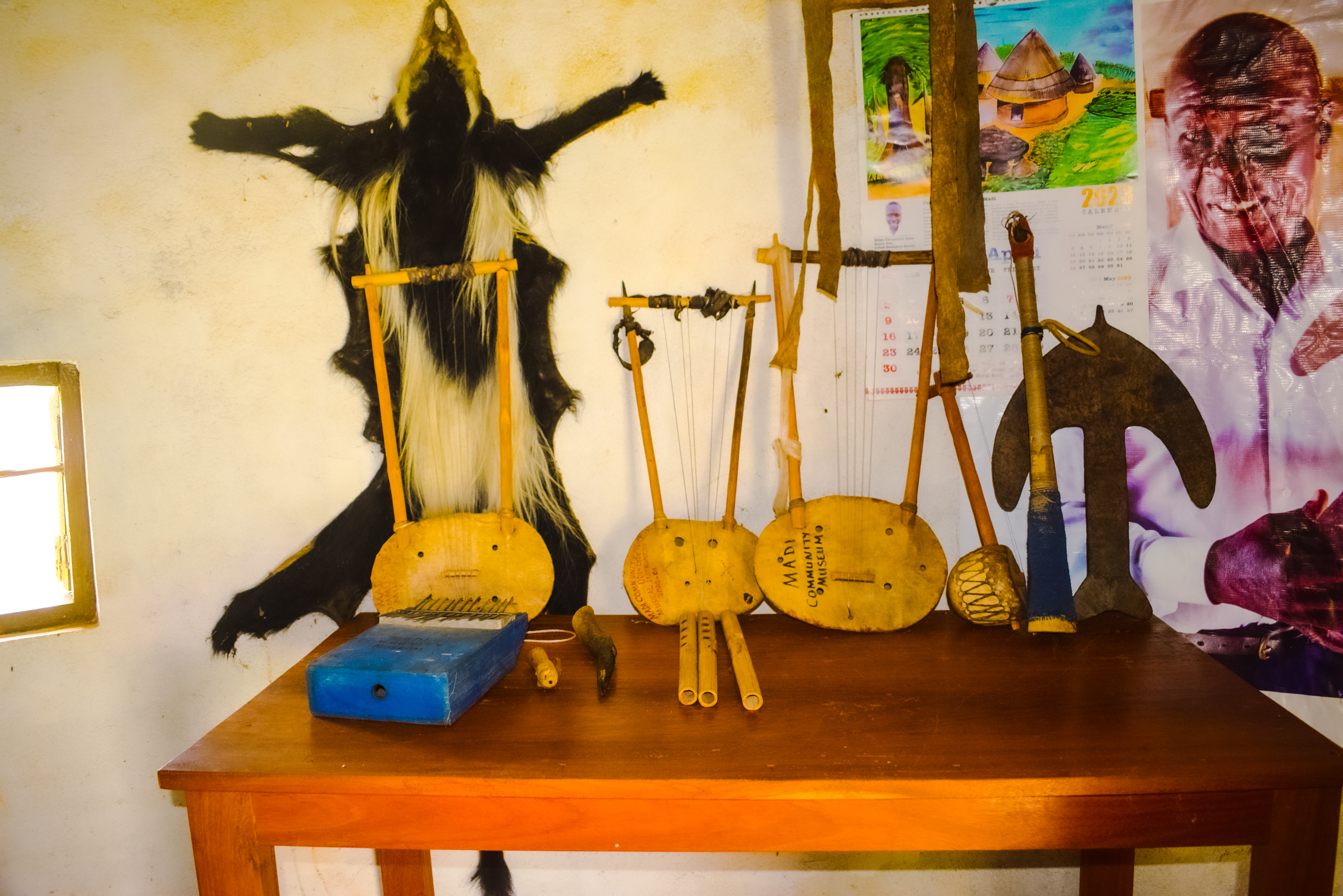
Traditional music instruments at Madi Community Museum

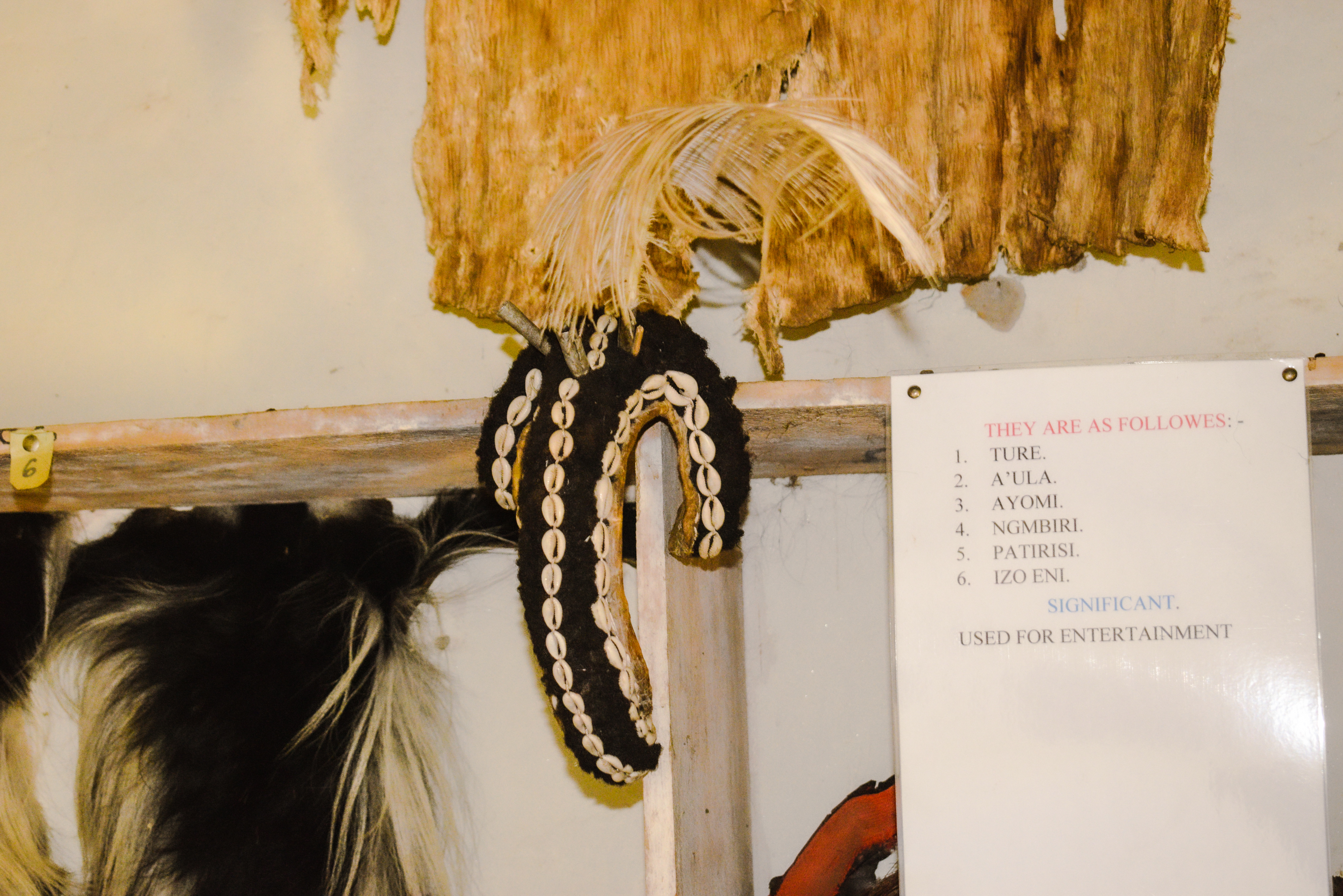
Traditional dance headgear and costume at Madi Community Museum

== See also ==
- Uganda Museum
- Uganda National Cultural Centre
- Ssemagulu Royal Museum
- Ateker Cultural Centre
- St. Luke Community Museum
- Uganda Railway Museum
