= Bulemba Museum =

Museum in Bulemba, Kasese District

- Location: Bulemba, Kasese District, Western Region, Uganda
- Type: Cultural

The Bulemba Museum is a cultural and community museum in the Kasese District of Uganda. It is located in Bulemba, a town in the Rwenzori Mountains, and is used by the Bakonzo people as an education center to interpret their culture, social life, and history.

== History ==
The Bulemba Museum is located in the Rwenzori region of western Uganda in Kasese District. It was established in 2012 with the aim of preserving and teaching local culture to future generations. As of 2013, the museum's director was Beatrice Masereka.

The museum pays tribute to the Rwenzururu Kingdom and its founding monarch, Omusinga Isaiah Mukirania Kibanzanga I. As a cultural pilgrimage site, thousands of people climb Bulemba Hill on October 19 each year to commemorate the death of the first king. The burial site of Mukirane, the former leader of the break away movement of the Rwenzururu from Tooro Kingdom is close to the museum.

In 2016, the Bulemba Museum was demolished by government forces, partly because it promoted the culture of a single community, the Bakonzo, rather than being all-embracing.

== Collection ==
The collection at the museum includes royal regalia of the late king, historical photographs of the Rwenzururu movement, and personal effects and clothing of the monarch. It also houses oral history transcripts of the cultural resistance.

== See also ==
- Uganda Museum
- Uganda National Cultural Centre
- Ssemagulu Royal Museum
- Uganda Railway Museum
- Ateker Cultural Centre
