= Ham Mukasa Museum =

Community museum in Uganda

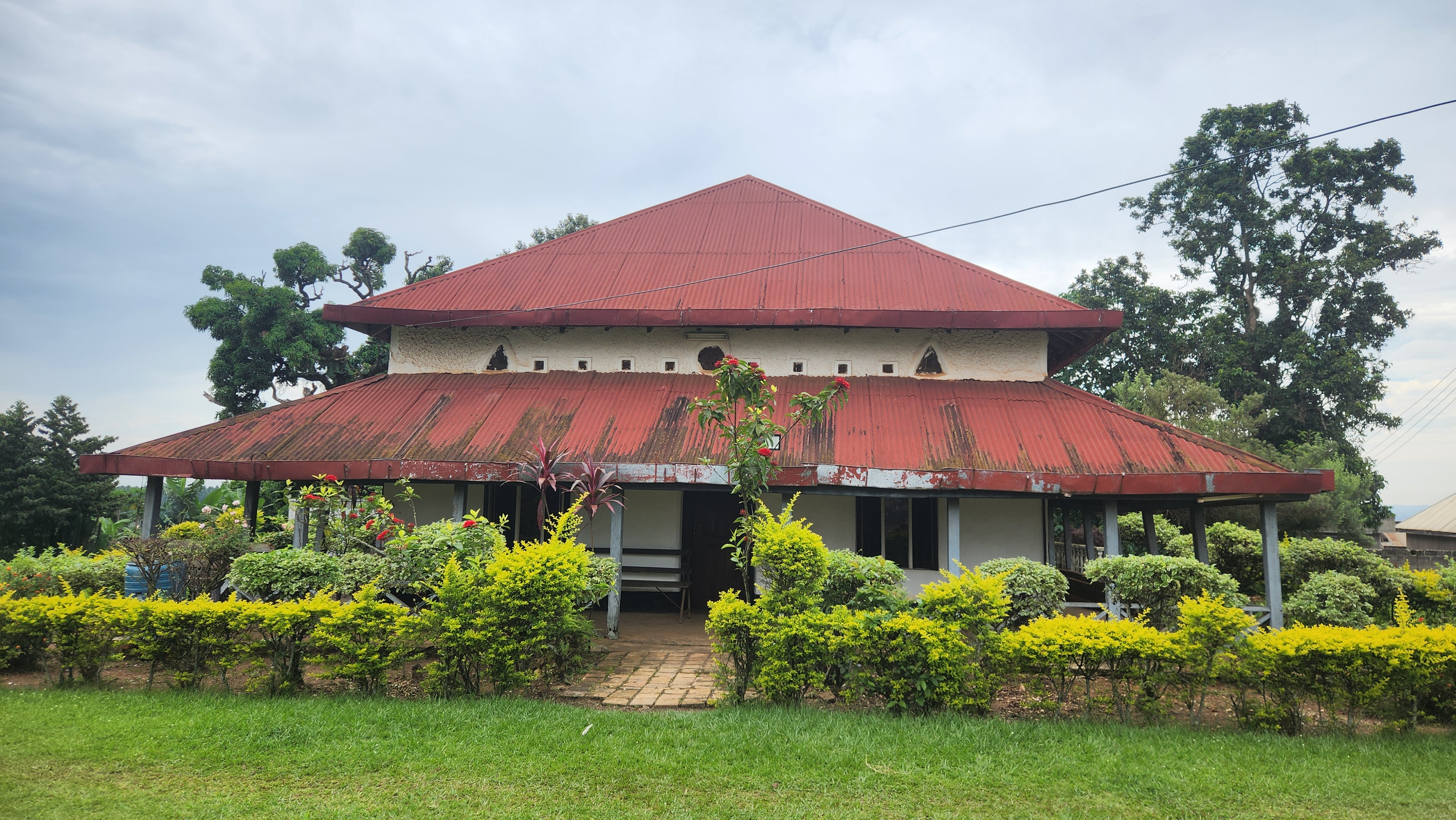
- Museum building

- Map of Uganda showing the location of Ham Mukasa Community Museum
- Established: 1906
- Location: Nassuuti, a village along Mukono-Kayunga Road in Mukono town
- Coordinates: 0°22′00″N 32°45′23″E
- Type: Historical

Ham Mukasa Museum is a Ugandan historical house museum and community museum at Ham Mukasa's house in Nassuuti village along Mukono-Kayunga road in Mukono town. It contains artifacts that show Ham Mukasa's heritage from 1868 to 1956.

== History ==
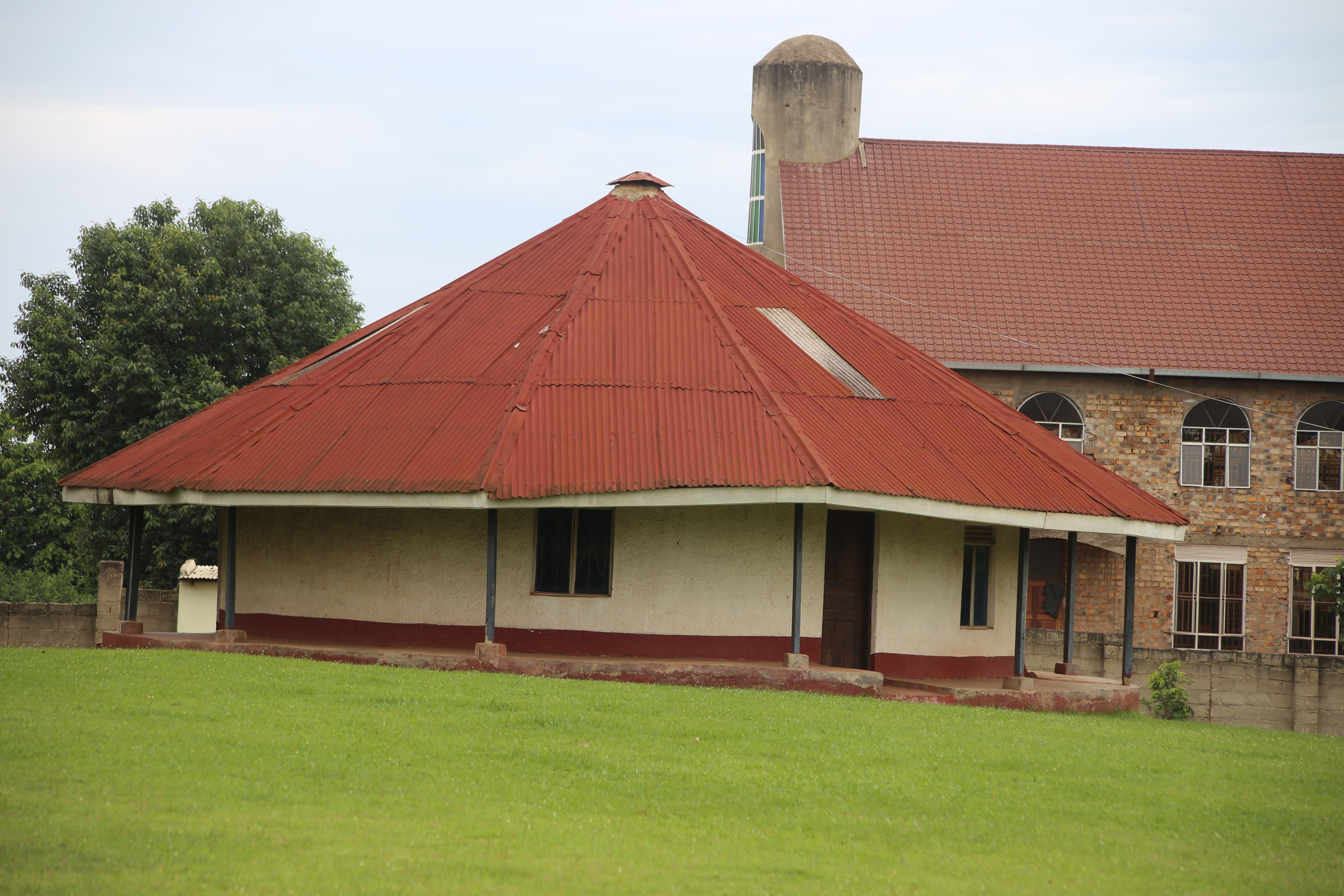
Visitors' reception at Ham Mukasa Museum

Ham Mukasa museum is in Akwatempola House, built in 1906. Ham Mukasa had two houses: one in Kyagwe in Mukono town (now known as the Ham Mukasa Museum) and also one in Mengo in Kampala.

The museum compound has a circular reception house that once was the main point for welcoming guests. The structure is distinguished by its three symbolic doors, each representing a distinct path and the visitors who used it: the Busoga Route was used by visitors arriving from Busoga, the Mengo/Kampala Route by visitors from Mengo as well as foreign guests, the Kyagwe Route by messengers and emissaries coming from Kyagwe.

The main house contained a single bedroom, and beside it once stood the children’s house, which later collapsed. The main house sitting room walls have portraits hanging on them, mostly black and white photographs depicting Ham Mukasa, his children and grandchildren, his colleagues, and several Buganda monarchs. Among them is a portrait of Kabaka Ronald Muwenda Mutebi II captured during his youth.

The Ham Mukasa museum houses a library containing his private collections of journals, newspapers, and books including his diary of a journey he made with Sir Apollo Kaggwa to England in 1901 to attend the coronation of King Edward VII. The archive is consulted by institutions such as Makerere University and Uganda Christian University.

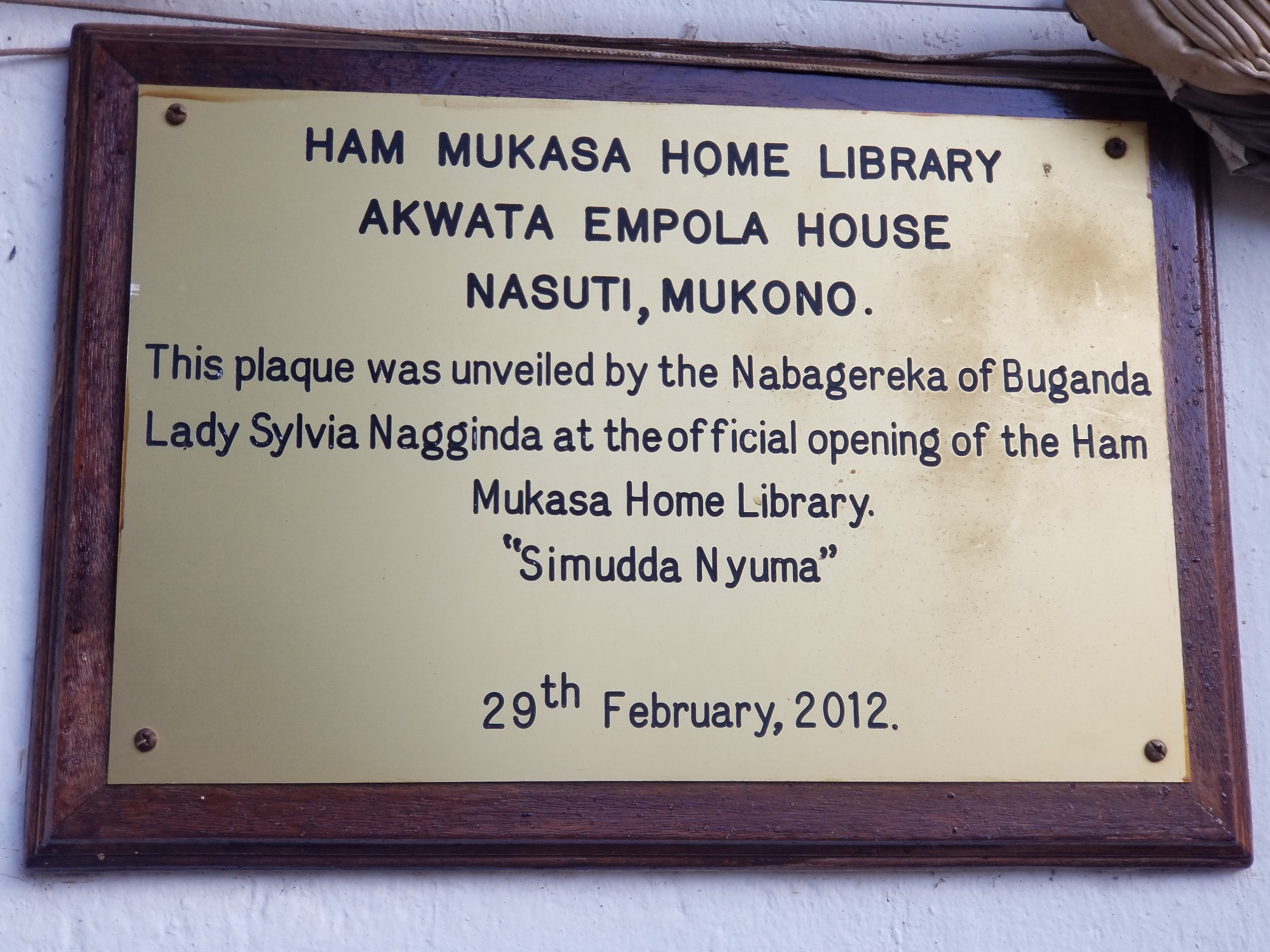
Ham Mukasa Country Residence

Museum tours are led by Ham Mukasa's family including his grandson, an ex-Ugandan ICT minister Dr. Ham Mulira. The museum is freely accessible as of April 2025 but proposals were put forward to charge a fee to help with maintenance of the site.

== Collections ==
The house is recognized as part of Buganda’s early tourism infrastructure and stands as a cultural symbol, preserving the heritage of one of Buganda’s most prominent chiefs, one of the early modernists of Uganda.

The museum's major emphasis is on operational management and preservation of its cultural collection consisting of about 1,000 items. It exhibits visual, classical and contemporary arts, comprising painting and Ham Mukasa's original texts, documentation and books.

In the compound of Ham Mukasa’s residence sits a rusted green Dodge from the 1930s with white patches. This vehicle is no longer in running order, but it once served as Mukasa’s personal means of transport, one he used to drive himself, his wife, and children. Its presence offers visitors a tangible connection to the colonial-era lifestyle of one of Buganda’s prominent chiefs and symbolizes the early adoption of modern technologies by Ugandan elites during that time.

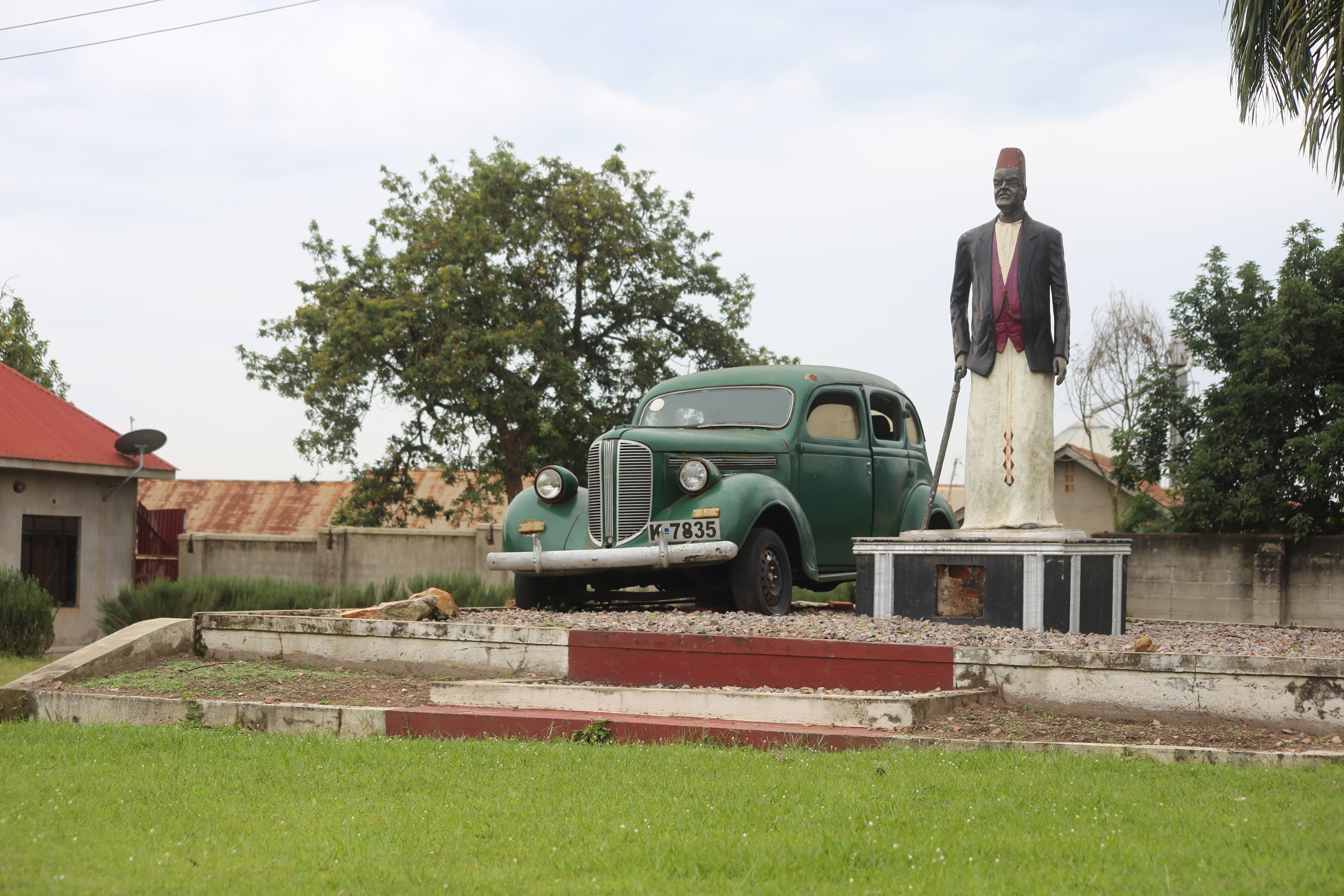
Sculpture of Ham Mukasa alongside his original vintage car

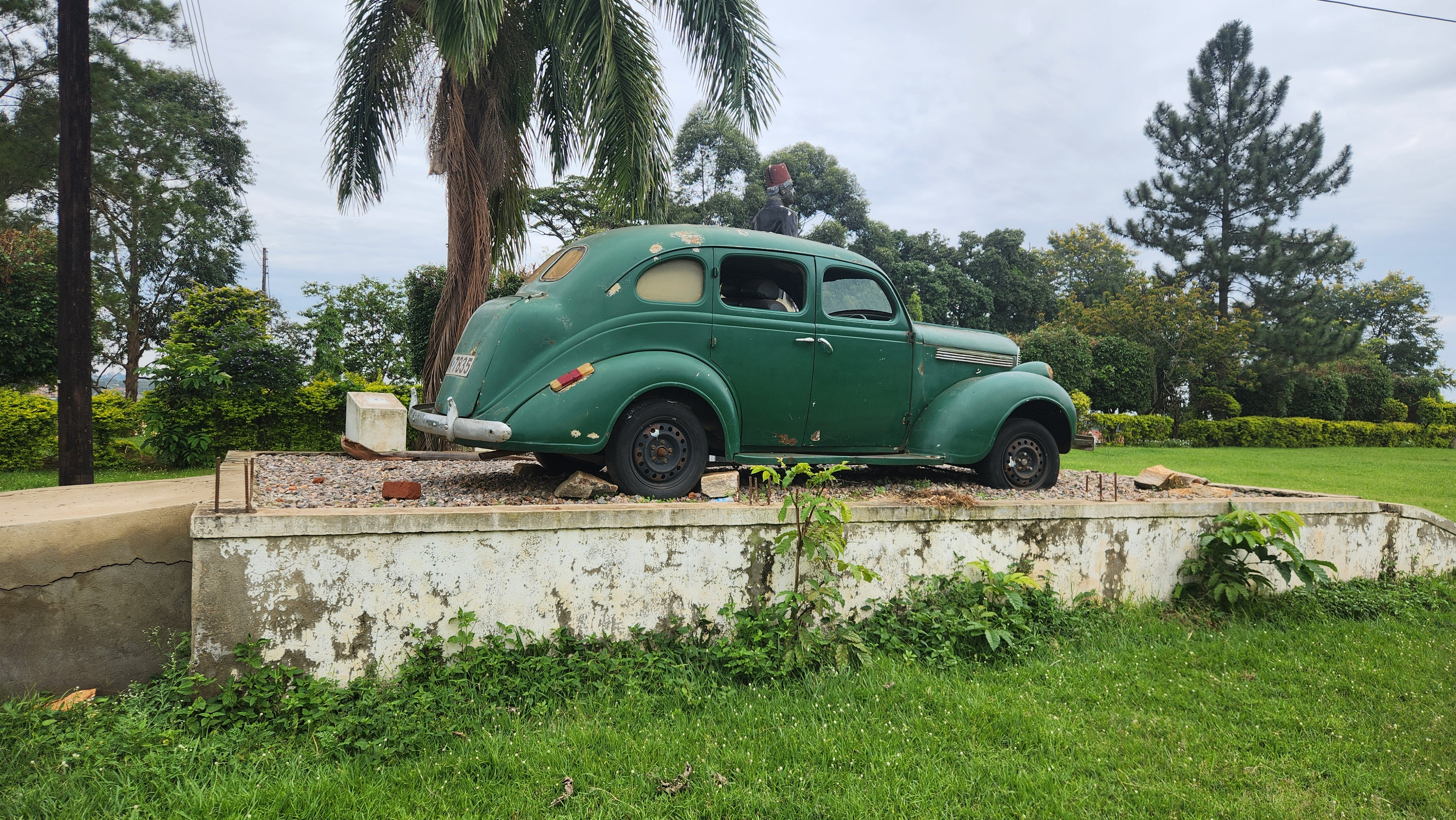
Ham Mukasa's vintage car at Akwata empola House

== See also ==
- Uganda Museum
- Uganda National Cultural Centre
- Ssemagulu Royal Museum
- Ateker Cultural Centre
- St. Luke Community Museum
