= St. Luke Community Museum =

Museum in Kiteredde, Kyotera, Uganda

Coordinates: 0°37′2.39″S 31°33′49.57″E

St. Luke Museum Community Museum
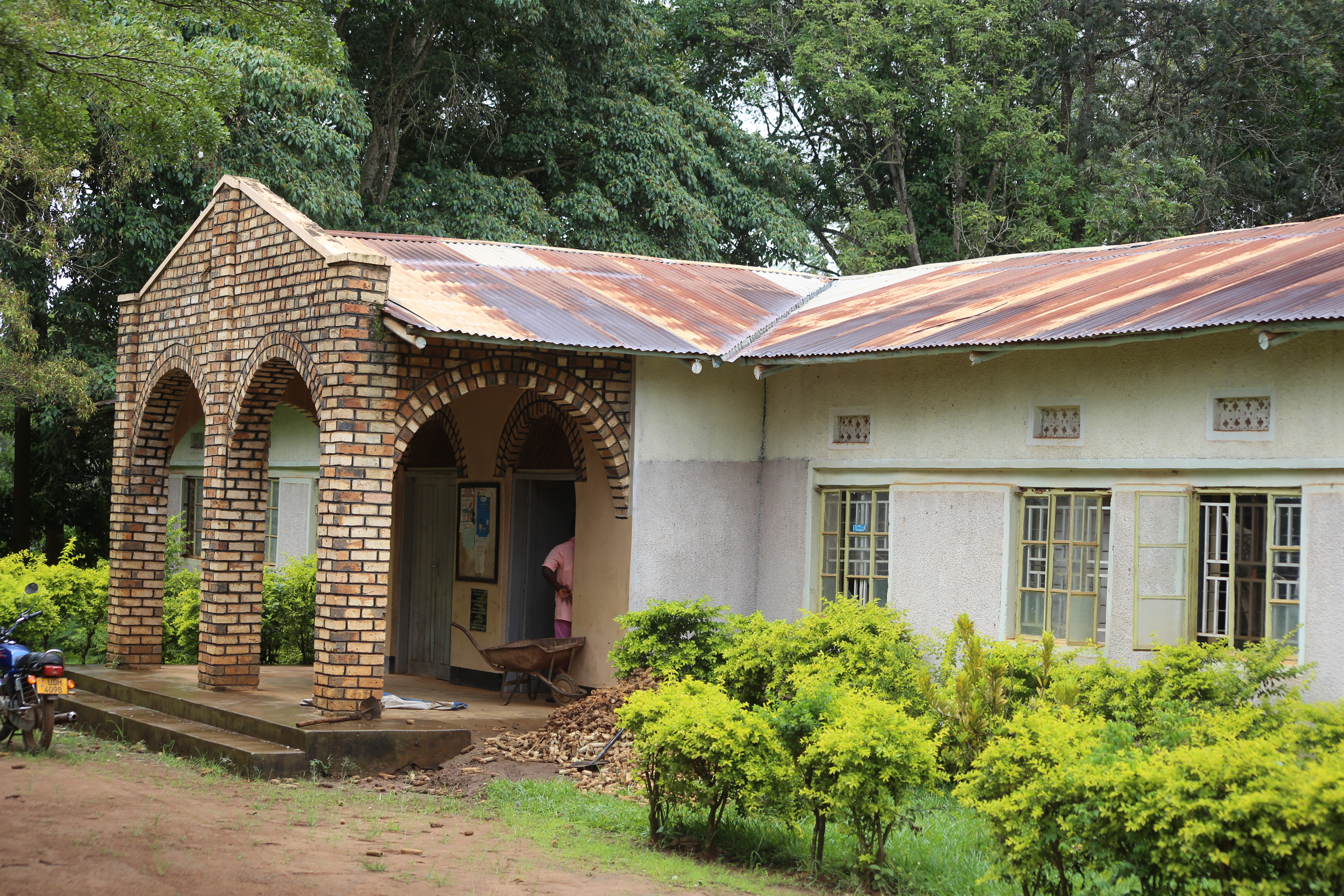
- Museum Building

- Map of Uganda showing the location of St. Luke Community Museum.
- Established: 2012
- Location: Kiteredde, Kyotera District 50km south of Masaka town along Masaka-Mutukula road
- Type: Historical
- Director: Brother Isabirye Ronald

St. Luke Community Museum is a Ugandan community museum located in Kiteredde, Kyotera District 50km south of Masaka City along Masaka-Mutukula road. The museum was founded by Brother Anatoli Wasswa, a religious leader affiliated to the Masaka Catholic Diocese.

== History ==
In 2012, Brother Anatoli Wasswa of the Bannakaroli Brothers of Masaka Catholic Diocese founded St. Luke Community Museum. The museum was founded with the aim of showcasing objects that were previously used by traditional medicine practitioners who had been converted to Christianity. They had been convinced that the practices were unchristian.

Brother Anatoli Wasswa used to teach healing methods that did not involve worshipping of ancestral spirits. The museum was also linked to a herbal medicine hospital where herbal medicine could be prescribed and administered to the public.

== Collections ==
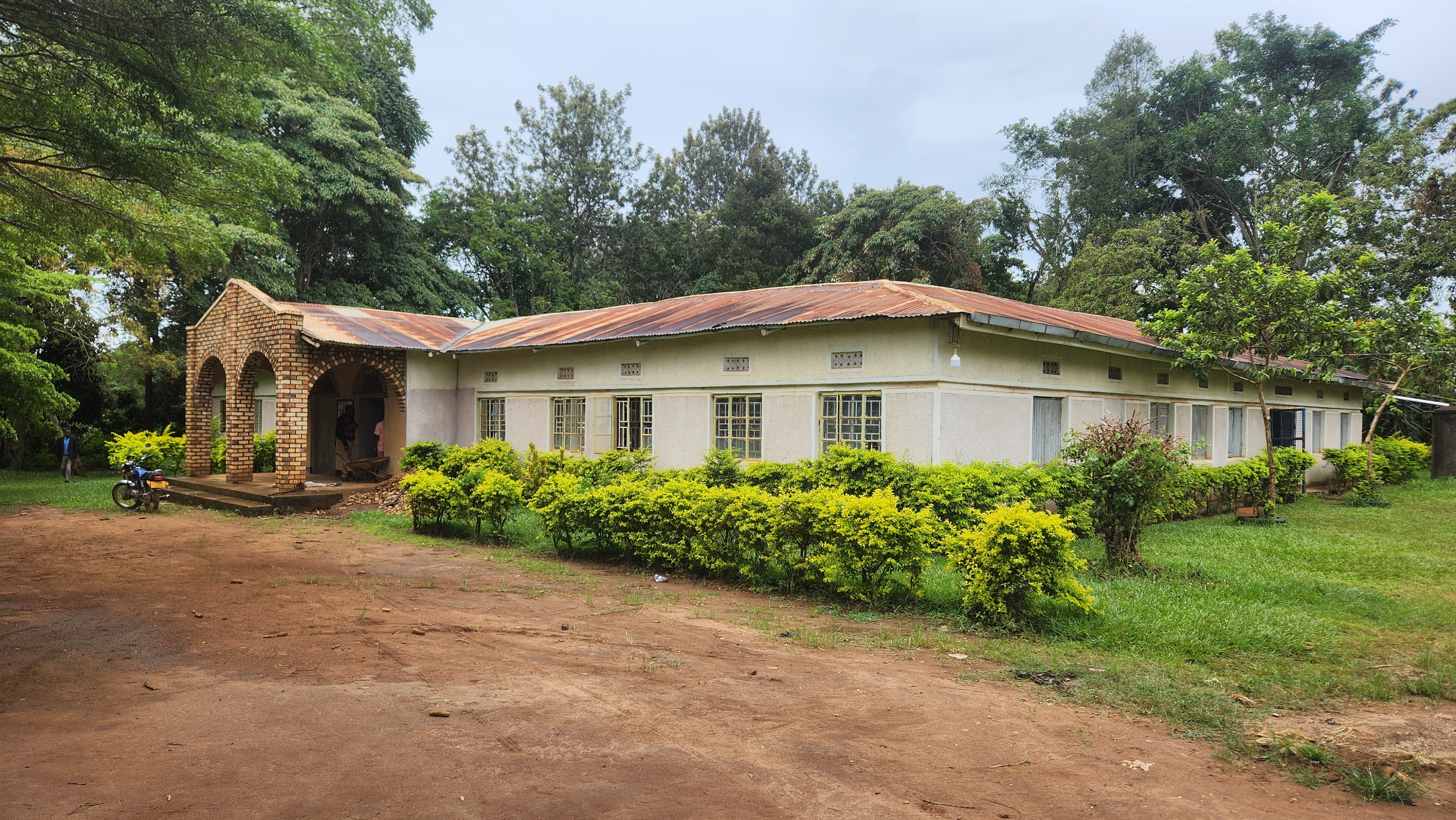
St. Luke Community Museum Building

The museum contains witch doctors' items traditionally used by witchdoctors, including Traditional bag, Gourds, Barkcloth animal horns that harbor hidden microphones and speakers, to illustrate the employment of stagecraft and sound effects to create supernatural illusions. The museum employs such displays to educate the general public about the performative aspect of witchcraft and challenge common superstitions. The museum is at the same time a site of cultural heritage and an academic institution, promoting critical analysis of traditional belief systems.

The museum also has an art gallery with exhibits of contemporary and traditional visual arts, such as sculpture, painting, and mixed media. It has a religion and spirituality display includes ritual artifacts, sacred writings, and symbolized artifacts across the range of religious experience and systems of faith. In its multifaceted displays, the St. Luke Community Museum is an educational and cultural institution that promotes critical examination of heritage, belief, and identity.

== See also ==
- Uganda Museum
- Uganda National Cultural Centre
- Ssemagulu Royal Museum
- Uganda Railway Museum
- Ateker Cultural Centre
- Ham Mukasa Museum
