= Uganda Railway Museum =

Community museum in Uganda

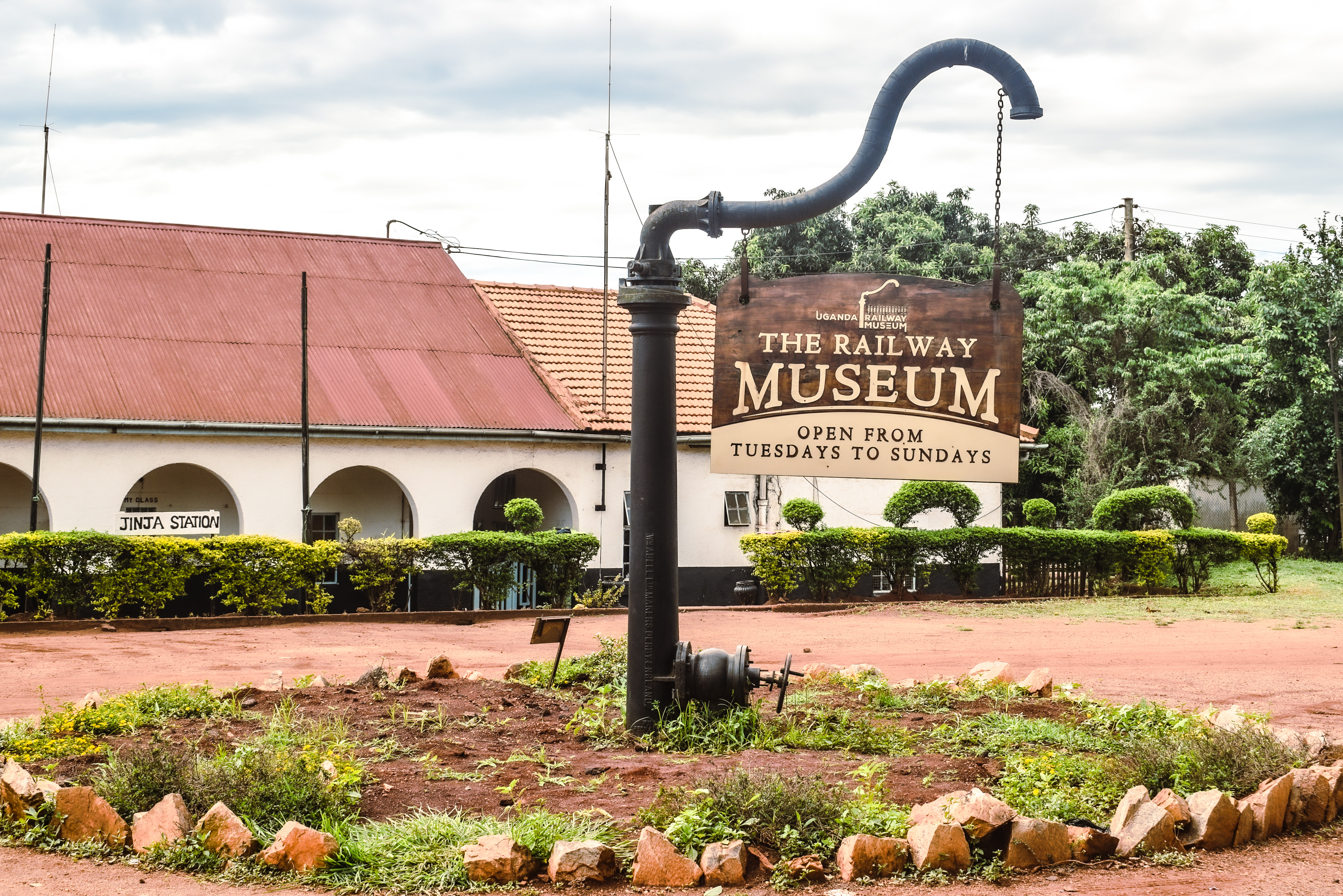
- Exterior of the Uganda Railway Museum

- Map of Uganda showing the location of Uganda Railway Museum
- Established: March 2022
- Location: Jinja Railway Station, Jinja, Uganda
- Coordinates: 0°26′43″N 33°13′07″E
- Type: Community museum
- Collection size: Historical railway artifacts, restored train engine and passenger car
- Founder: Cross-Cultural Foundation of Uganda
- Public transit access: Jinja Railway Station

Uganda Railway Museum is a Ugandan community museum located in Jinja, Uganda along the Jinja-Iganga highway. The museum showcases the history of the Uganda's railway system from its origins during the colonial times to its role in nation-building. The museum is at the Jinja Railway Station, which was constructed in 1928. It was opened to the public in March 2022 by the Cross-Cultural Foundation of Uganda.

== History ==
In 1914, a six-kilometer railway line was built from Luzira to Kampala. There was an attempt to extend the railway to Bombo, but it initially stopped in Kawempe, which is how "Kalerwe" got its name. The Kampala-Kawempe railway began operations in 1923 and was later extended to Bombo. Still, it didn't boost cotton production as the colonialists expected, so the Kampala-Bombo railway line was closed in 1926. This is how the construction of another railway began in Jinja 1928. The museum shows what roles the railway and Rail transport in Uganda played during a time when Uganda was still a British Colony in the colonial era and post independence.

== Collection ==
Inside, there are displays of words and pictures about how the railway in Uganda got started and what it did for the country. There's also an old train engine and a fancy passenger car that have been fixed up. A short movie and other stuff explain why the railway was so important to people and culture. It even affected place names, like Kalerwe. The museum operates from Tuesday through Sunday and has both indoor and outdoor exhibits.

== Gallery ==
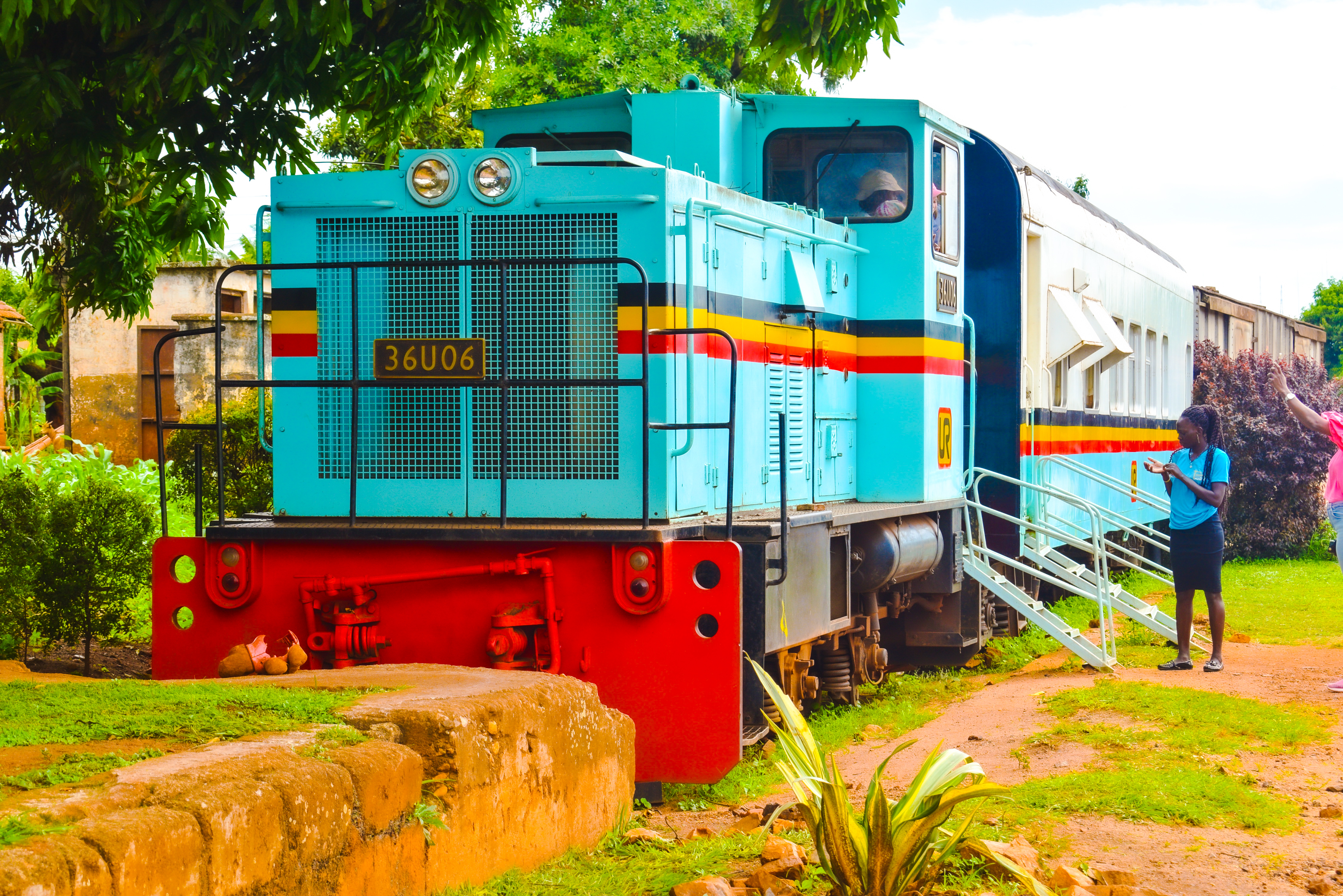
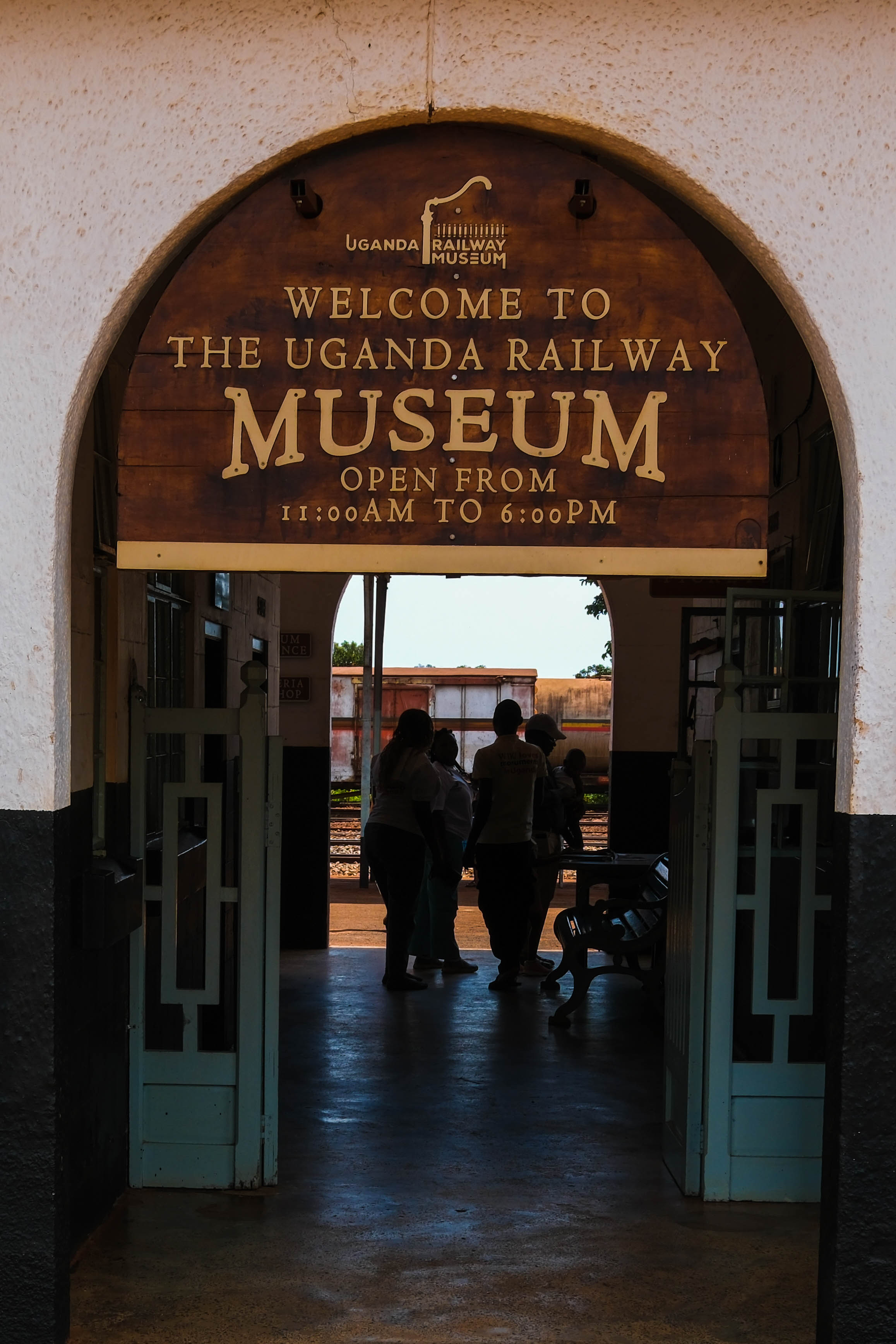
Members of the Wikimedia Community User Group Uganda sign in at the entrance of the Uganda Railway Museum on 5^{th} December 2025
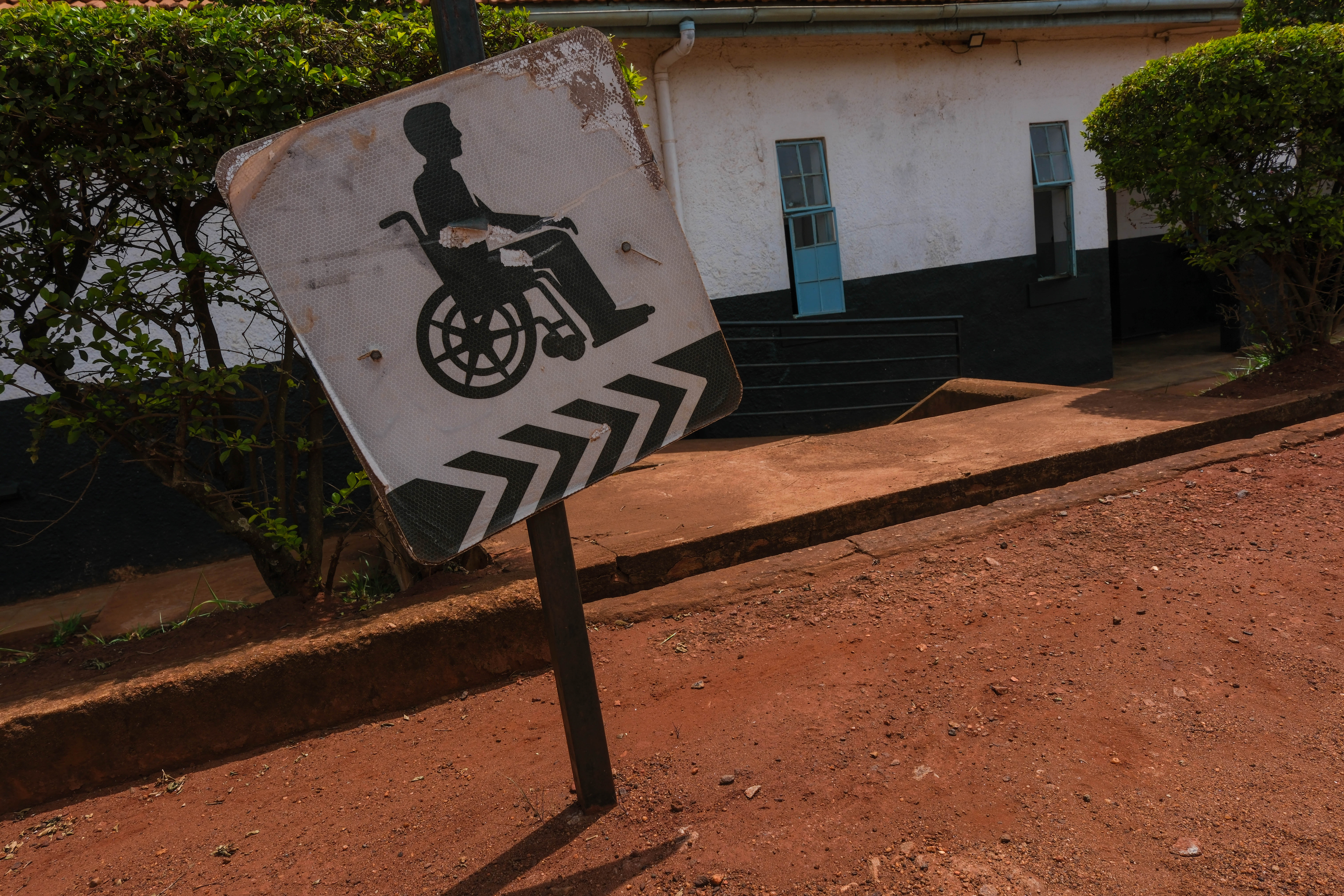
A disabled access signpost at the entrance of the Uganda Railway Museum near a ramp, highlighting the museum’s accessibility for all visitors photographed on 5^{th} December 2025
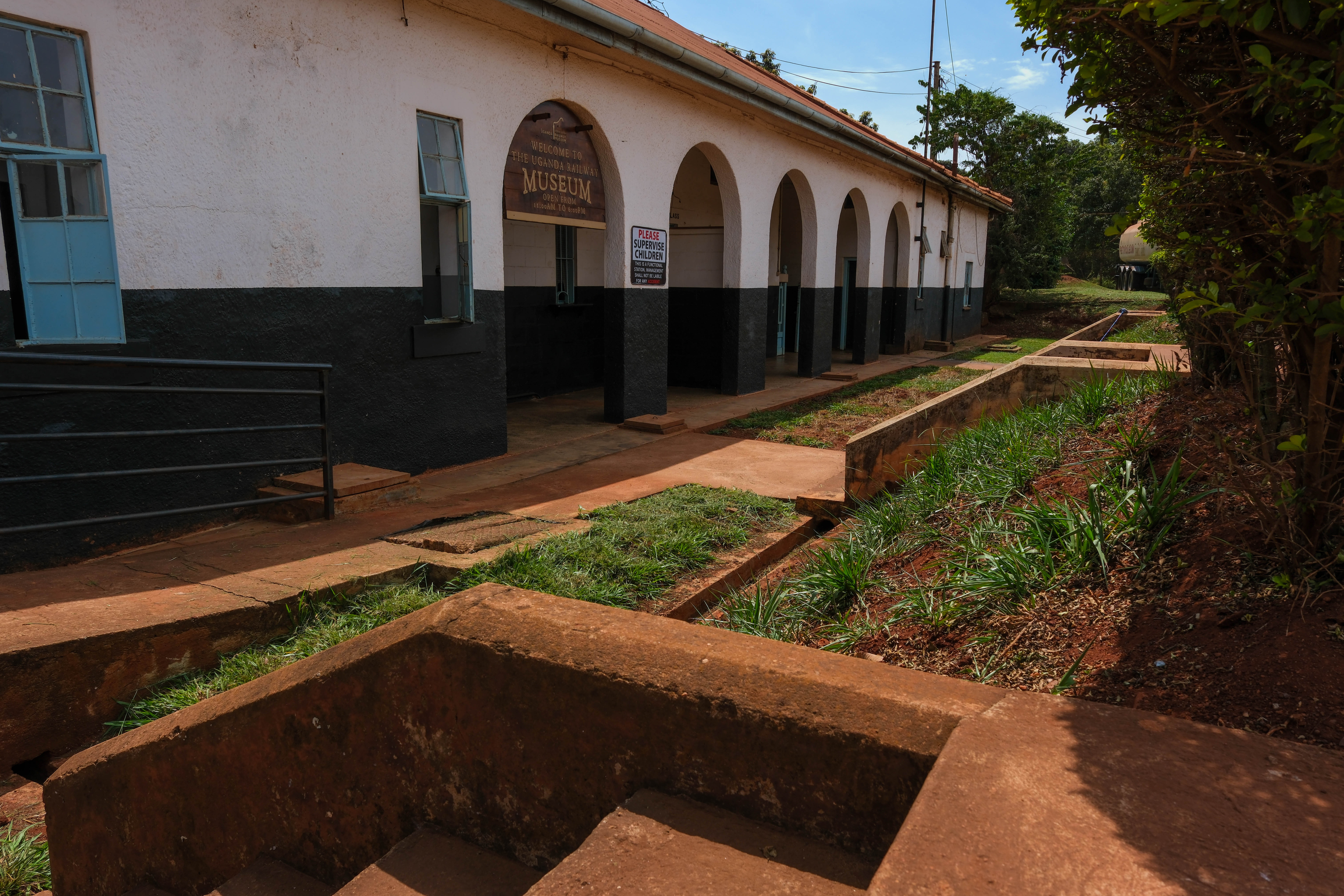
A front view of the Uganda Railway Museum in Jinja, showing access via a ramp for visitors with disabilities and steps at the main entrance. The Museum is open from Tuesday to Sundays from 11am to 6pm
Train at the Uganda Railway Museum

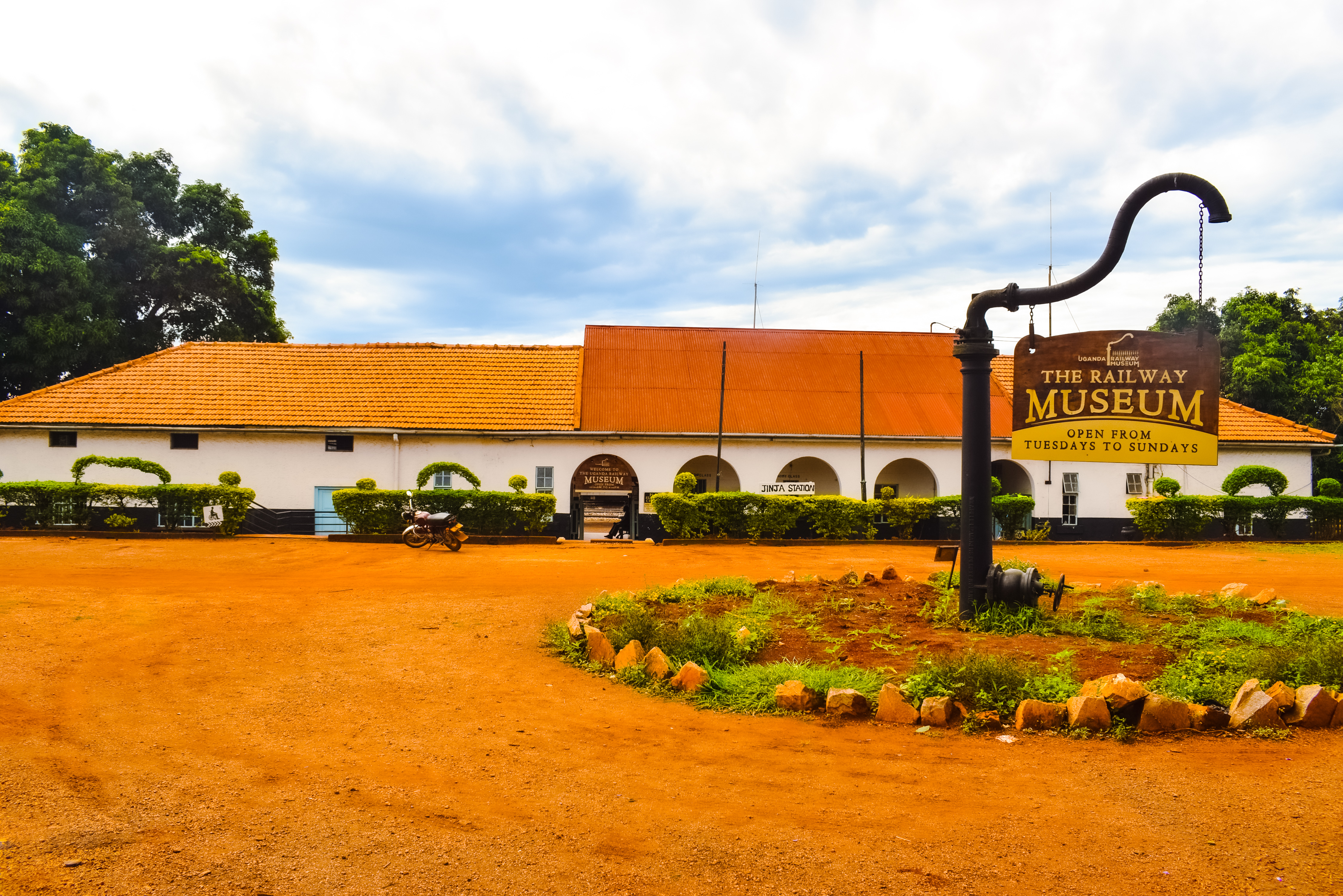
Exterior of the Uganda Railway Museum

== See also ==
- Uganda Museum
- Uganda National Cultural Centre
- Ssemagulu Royal Museum
- Ateker Cultural Centre
- St. Luke Community Museum
- Kigulu Cultural Museum
