= Kawalya =

Kawalya is a name. Notable people with the name include:

- Joanita Kawalya, Ugandan musician
- Michael Kawalya Kagwa, Ugandan politician
