= Kagwa (surname) =

Kagwa is a surname. Notable people with the surname include:

- Gaetano Kagwa, Ugandan actor
- Michael Kawalya Kagwa, Ugandan politician
- Philippa Namutebi Kabali-Kagwa (born 1964), Ugandan author
- André Kagwa Rwisereka (1949–2010), Rwandan politician
