= The Open Museum =

Coordinates: 55.8115°N 4.3658°W

- Established: 1989
- Location: Woodhead Road, Glasgow Museums Resource Centre, Glasgow G53 7NN, Scotland
- Website: https://www.glasgowlife.org.uk/museums/the-open-museum

The Open Museum is a community museum in Glasgow, Scotland. The Open Museum is run out of the Glasgow Museums Resource Centre. It brings museum collections beyond the limits of the museum walls and out into the Glasgow community. The Open Museum is one of ten museums under the broader title the Glasgow Museums and many consider the Open Museum to be the “outreach arm.” Founded in 1989, the Glasgow Open Museum's goal is to let the public explore their archive without necessarily having to come to the museum. The people of Glasgow are allowed to use the objects for their own research and exhibitions.

== History ==
Since 1989, the museum has worked with schools, senior centres, businesses, and prisons in addition to encouraging the public to engage with staff on community projects that explore contemporary issues that impact Glasgow. The Glasgow Open Museum's goal is to create a more fluid relationship with the public and to bring the Museum to those that cannot make their way inside the museum. In America a trend of artist inspired exhibits helped museums bring their pieces from the archives onto display, but never have American museums let the local public interact with the objects in the archives the way the Open Museum does.
