= Ham Mukasa =

Ugandan politician

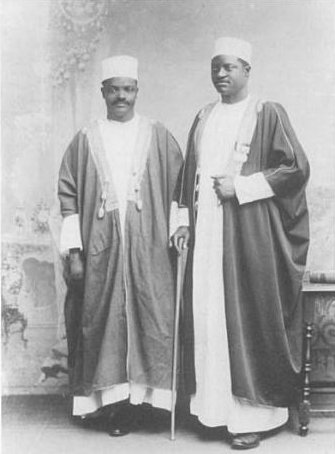
- Ham Mukasa (left) with Apolo Kagwa, 1902
- Born: c. 1870; Buddu, Buganda (present-day Masaka District, Uganda)
- Died: 1956
- Other name: Hamu Mukasa
- Occupations: Chief, writer, secretary, politician
- Known for: Secretary to Apolo Kagwa; Ssaza chief of Kyaggwe; author of Uganda's Katikiro in England
- Spouse(s): Hannah Mawemuko (d. 1919), Sarah Nabikolo
- Children: 14, including Victoria Sarah Kisosonkole
- Relatives: Muwenda Mutebi II (grandson)

Ham Mukasa also referred to as Hamu Mukasa (c. 1870–1956) was a vizier in the court of Mutesa I of Buganda (in present-day Uganda) and later secretary to Apolo Kagwa. He was fluent in both English and Swahili. He wrote one of the first glossaries of the Ganda language.

== Early life ==
Mukasa was the son of Makabugo Sensalire, a minor chief in Buddu (in present-day Masaka District). He converted to Christianity at a young age. He suffered serious injury in the 1886 massacre of Christians by Mwanga II. As a result, he had a weak leg. Around 1898, he married Hannah Mawemuko, the daughter of a former chief minister (Katikkiro) of Buganda.

== Career ==
Ham Mukasa was placed in the palace of Kabaka Mutesa I as a page at the age of nine by his father, a clan chief in Buganda. While in the palace, Mukasa at first received instruction from Islamic teachers who held sway in Mutesa's court; however, he was later drawn to the Protestants, who baptised him Ham. It was as a Christian, and as a Protestant, that he took part in Buganda's religious wars of 1888–1892.

Mukasa was appointed the ssaza (county) chief of Kyaggwe - known as the Ssekiboobo - in 1905, and served in the position until 1935 when he retired.

== Journeys in England ==
Mukasa's book Uganda's Katikiro in England details his experiences on his journey from his homeland to the coronation of Edward VII of the United Kingdom, as secretary to Katikkiro (Prime Minister) Apolo Kagwa. It was translated into English by Ernest Millar of the Church Mission Society in Uganda. In London, Mukasa stayed at Alexandra Palace, and visited the London Hippodrome, attended a play in Drury Lane, and met with a variety of people such as writer Henry Morton Stanley and ex-governor of Uganda Harry Johnston.

Ham Mukasa returned to England in 1913, this time accompanying the child Kabaka Cwa who was on an official visit.

== Personal life ==
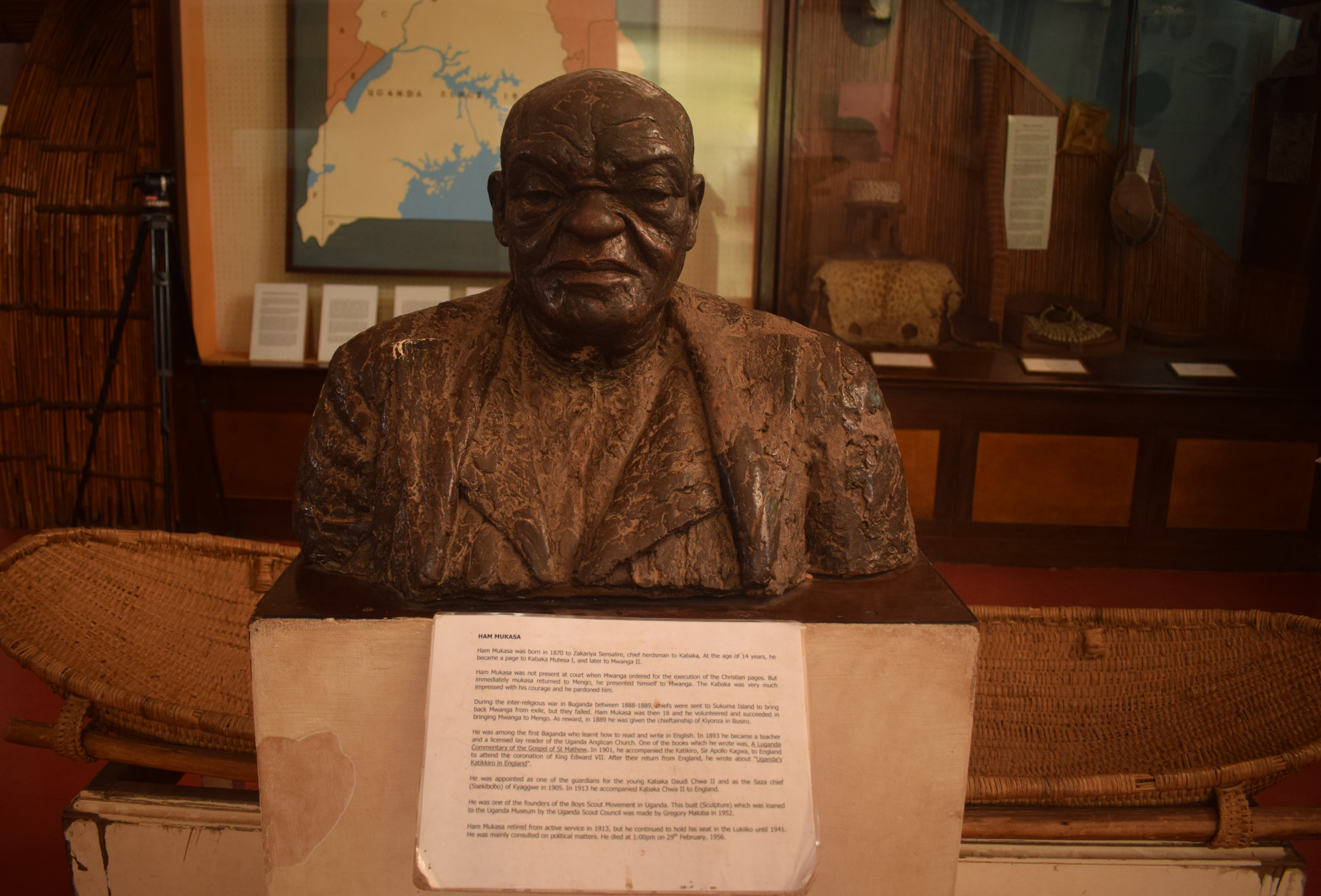
A bust of Hamu Mukasa on display at the Uganda Museum

Ham Mukasa married his first wife, Hanna Wawemuko when he was 27 years old. They had four children together. Wawemuko died in 1919, and Mukasa remarried a year later. He had ten children with his second wife, Sarah Nabikolo.

Victoria Sarah Kisosonkole, Mukasa's daughter with Hanna Wawemuko, was the mother of Damali Kisosonkole and Sarah Kisosonkole, who were both married to Ssekabaka Edward Muteesa II. Sarah Kisosonkole is the mother of the current Kabaka of Buganda, Muwenda Mutebi II.

There is a statue of Hamu Mukasa erected at the Uganda Museum, and his memory is also kept alive by the Ham Mukasa Museum, which is situated at Nassuuti village along Mukono-Kayunga road. It contains his belongings, works, and artifacts and stands as a site for education and a reminder of his work towards Ugandan history.
