= Glasgow Museums =

Group of museums in Glasgow, Scotland

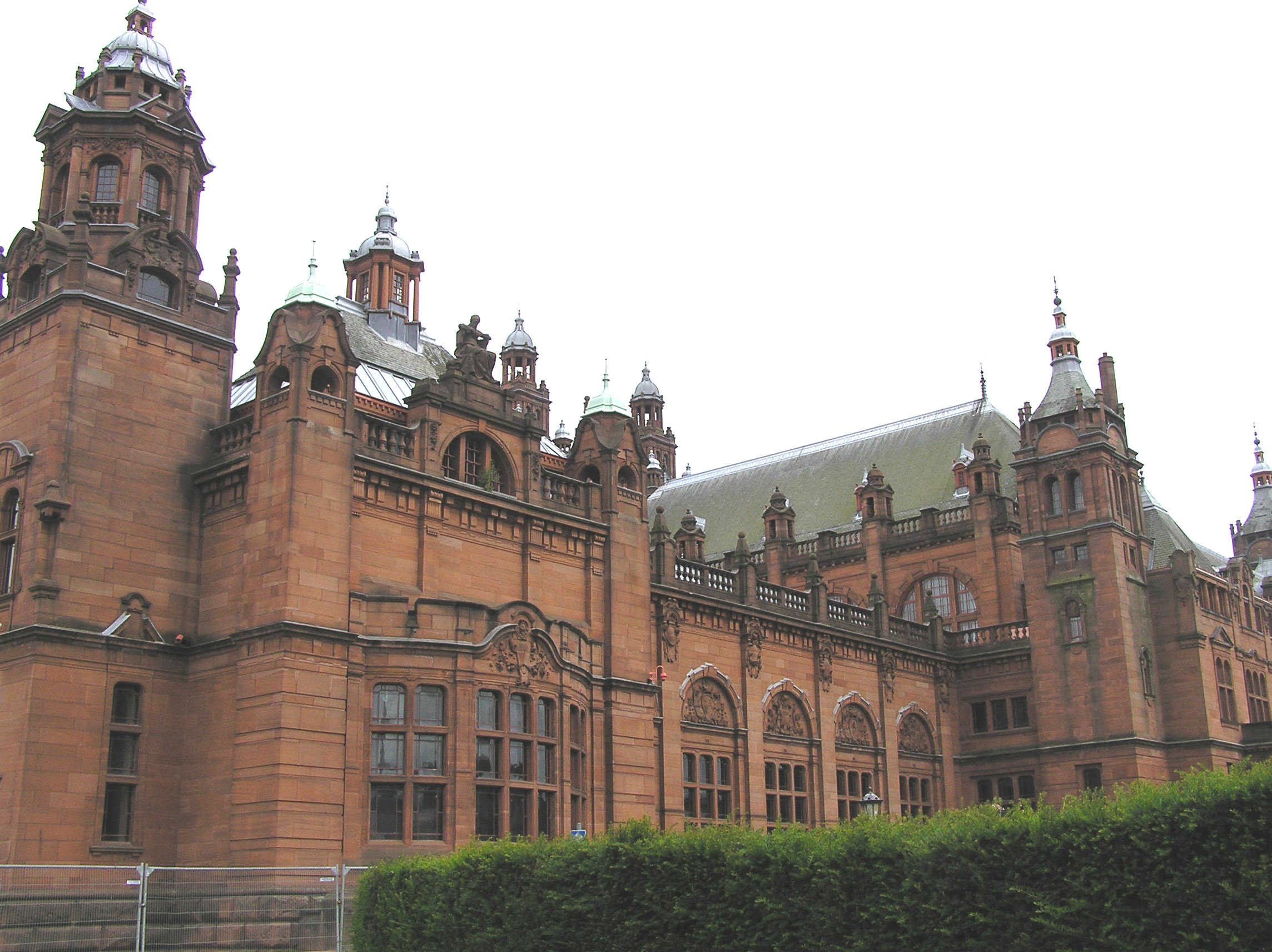
The Kelvingrove Art Gallery and Museum

Glasgow Museums is a group of museums and galleries owned by the City of Glasgow, Scotland. They hold about 1.6 million objects including over 60,000 art works, over 200,000 items in the human history collections, over 21,000 items relating to transport and technology, and over 585,000 natural history specimens. They are managed by Glasgow Life (formally Glasgow Sport and Culture), an 'arm's length' external organisation contracted by Glasgow City Council to provide cultural, sporting and learning activities in the city. The buildings and contents are wholly owned by Glasgow City Council, the staff are employees of Glasgow City Council, and the charity is controlled by Glasgow City Council.

The museums and galleries are:

- Burrell Collection
- Gallery of Modern Art (GoMA)
- Glasgow Museums Resource Centre
- Kelvin Hall (Museum store)
- Kelvingrove Art Gallery and Museum
- The Open Museum
- People's Palace
- Provand's Lordship
- Riverside Museum
- Scotland Street School Museum
- St Mungo Museum of Religious Life and Art

== Repatriations ==
Glasgow Museums has started repatriating stolen objects from their collections to their original cultures.

- India
  - 6 items stolen from shines and temples in the 19th century
  - tulwar and scabbard stolen from the collection of Nizam of Hyderabad and sold to Archibald Hunter in 1905
- Nigeria
  - 19 Benin Bronzes taken during the Benin Expedition of 1897
- Indigenous American tribes
  - A ghost shirt from the Lakota nation was the first object from Glasgow Museums to be repatriated in 1998
  - 25 items from Lakota and Oceti Sakowin tribes, sold and donated to Glasgow Museums by George Crager, who worked for the Buffalo Bill Wild West Show. These will be returned to the Cheyenne River Sioux and Oglala Sioux tribes.

== See also ==
- List of museums in Scotland, including other museums in Glasgow not part of Glasgow Museums
