= Apollo Kaggwa =

Ugandan politician

Sir Apollo Kagwa
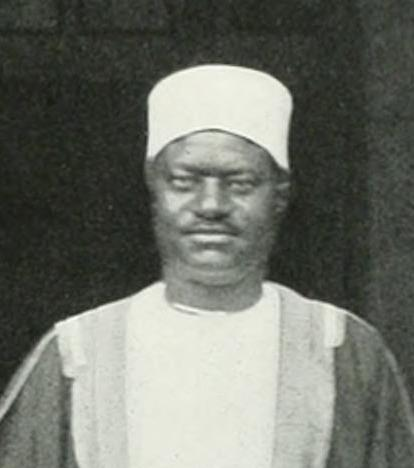
- Apollo Kagwa

Katikkiro of Buganda
- In office 1890–1926
- Monarch: Mwanga II

Regent of Buganda
- In office 1897–1914
- Monarch: Daudi Chwa II

Personal details
- Born: 1864
- Died: 1927 (aged 62–63)
- Children: 23, including Michael Kawalya Kagwa
- Occupation: Political leader, ethnographer, author
- Awards: KCMG, MBE

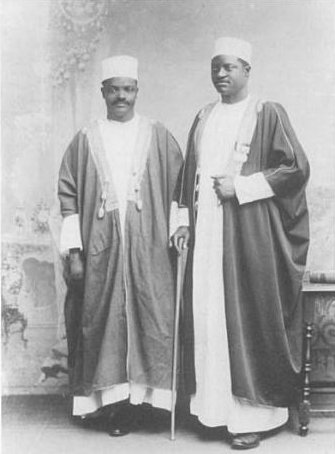
Apollo Kagwa (right) with his secretary Ham Mukasa, 1902

Sir Apollo Kagwa (standard Luganda orthography spelling Kaggwa) KCMG MBE (1864–1927) was a major intellectual and political leader in Uganda when it was under British rule. He was a leader of the Protestant faction and was appointed prime minister (Katikkiro) of the Kingdom of Buganda by King Mwanga II in 1890. He served until 1926. Kagwa served as prince regent from 1897 until 1914 when the infant King Daudi Chwa came of age. He was Buganda's first and foremost ethnographer.

== Career ==
Kagwa was an administrative apprentice at the royal palace of Buganda when the first Christian missionaries arrived in the 1870s. These palace apprentices, referred to as pages by European historians of the era, were bright youths from all over the kingdom sent to the palace to train as the next generation of leaders. He was one of the earliest converts to the Protestant faith. He nearly became one of the Uganda Martyrs when King Mwanga II fell out with the Christians a few years later. He was reportedly spared execution because he had already shown himself to be exceptionally capable as an assistant in the treasury. From 1885 to 1887, the kingdom fell into a religious civil war with Protestants, Catholics, and Moslem factions vying for control. Kagwa, still in his twenties, was from early on recognized as the leader of the Protestant faction. A keen rifleman, Kagwa served actively in combat during these wars. The Moslems were in ascendancy in the early part of the war, and Kagwa and other Protestants spent some time in exile in the neighboring kingdom of Ankole.

== Prime minister ==
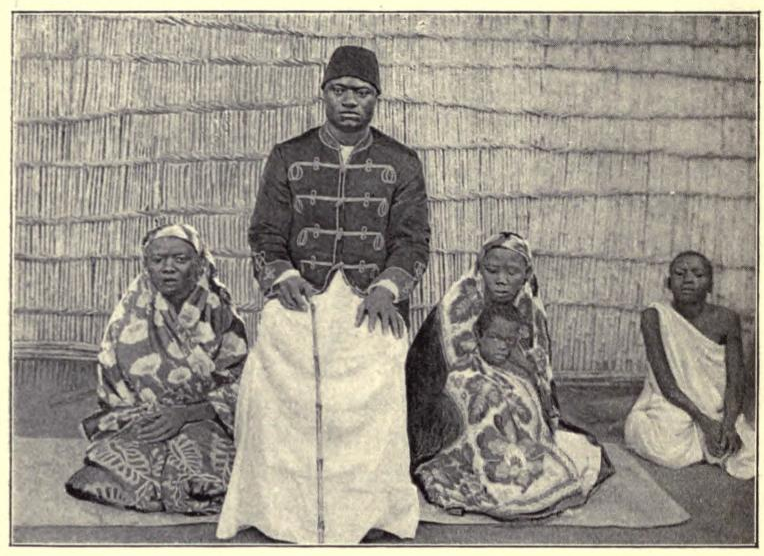
Kattikiro Apollo Kaggwa in 1893

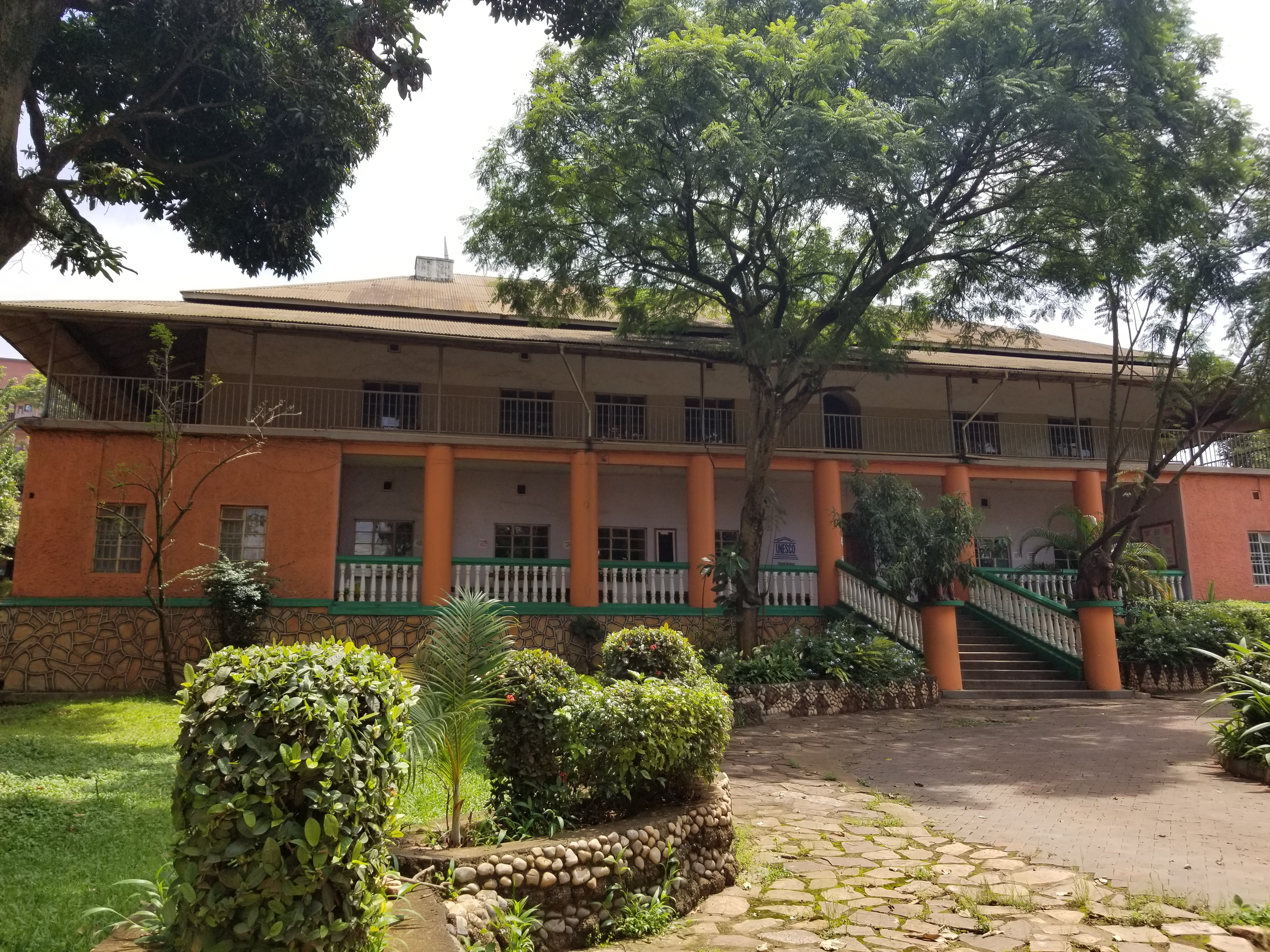
House of Apollo Kaggwa, constructed in 1903

King Mwanga, temporarily deposed, was restored in 1890 with the assistance of the Protestants, and Kagwa was named Katikkiro (Prime Minister). King Mwanga was again deposed in 1897 when he chose to reject foreign influence and fought an unsuccessful war with the British. An infant prince, Daudi Chwa, was named King (Kabaka) with Kaggwa as one of three regents. Kagwa was one of the negotiators of the Uganda Agreement, by which Buganda became a British protectorate with limited internal autonomy.

The Uganda Agreement of 1900 solidified the power of the largely Protestant 'Bakungu' client-chiefs, led by Kagwa. London sent only a few officials to administer the country, relying primarily on the 'Bakungu' chiefs. For decades they were preferred because of their political skills, their Christianity, their friendly relations with the British, There are their ability to collect taxes, and the proximity of Entebbe (the capital) was close to the Buganda capital. By The 1920s the British administrators were more confident, and have less need for military or administrative support. Colonial officials taxed cash crops produced by the peasants. There was popular discontent among the Baganda rank-and-file, which we can the position of their leaders. In 1912 Kagwa moved to solidify 'Bakungu' power by proposing a second 'Lukiko' for Buganda with himself as president and the 'Bakungu' as a sort of hereditary aristocracy. British officials vetoed the idea when they discovered widespread popular opposition. Instead British officials began some reforms and attempted to make the 'Lukiko' a genuine representative assembly.

== Travels ==
He visited England in 1902 in his capacity as Katikkiro (Prime Minister), for the coronation of King Edward VII, accompanied by his secretary, Ham Mukasa.

== Books ==
Kagwa authored many books on Buganda, including a general history Bassekabaka ba Buganda, a treatise on laws and customs Empisa z'Abaganda and a collection of folklore Engero z'Abaganda. His history of Buganda included brief histories of the neighboring kingdoms of Bunyoro and Ankole. Some of his books have been translated into English.

== Career ==
He was a strong supporter of the establishment of modern education in Uganda. In particular, he was appalled by what he saw as a tendency of the sons of the nation's leaders to grow up spoiled, in contrast to the spartan upbringing his generation received from the palace apprenticeship system. He worked with British missionaries to establish boarding schools, notably King's College Budo, explicitly to keep young noblemen from growing up spoiled.

In 1918, he was made an honorary member of the Order of the British Empire for services in raising and organising native levies and local Defence Corps in the Uganda Protectorate.

== Personal life ==
He had 23 children, including Michael Kawalya Kagwa (who served as Buganda's Katikiro from 1945 to 1950)

== Quotes about Kaggwa ==
"… it was Kaggwa more than anyone else whom Mwanga abhorred. His personal contribution to Mwanga's downfall is therefore enormous, as Mwanga himself pointed out in more than one letter."

- MM Semakula Kiwanuka

"... and just as Queen Elizabeth I had bestowed a knighthood on a notorious pirate, Francis Drake, so had King Edward VII bestowed a knighthood on Apolo Kaggwa. Sir Francis Drake and Sir Apolo Kaggwa were both predators and were honoured for their vices. Francis Drake delivered stolen Spanish gold and silver bullion and Apolo Kaggwa delivered Buganda's sovereignty."

- Samwiri Lwanga-Lunyiigo, Mwanga II (2011), page 2

"The real head of the country, British officials excepted, is Apolo Kagwa, the Prime Minister or Katikiro. The page-boy who bore the scars of Mwanga's rage has developed into a leader in war and a ruler in peace whose force of peace and character and genuine Christianity have made him a power for good."

- JD Mullins, The Wonderful Story of Uganda (1908), page 115.

== Bibliography of his writings ==
- Kagwa, Apolo. The customs of the Baganda (Columbia University Press, 1934).
- Kagwa, Apolo. The kings of Buganda (East African Publishing House, 1971).
