= Michael Kawalya-Kagwa =

Ugandan politician

Michael Hamilton Kawalya-Kaggwa

Katikiro (chief minister) of Buganda
- In office 1945–1950

Personal details
- Born: 8 January 1898 Buganda, Uganda Protectorate
- Died: 9 September 1971 (aged 73) Uganda
- Spouse: Catherine Margaret Nanjobe
- Children: Several children
- Parent: Sir Apollo Kaggwa (father)
- Occupation: Politician
- Known for: Katikiro of Buganda; member of Uganda Legislative Council (LEGCO)
- Awards: Order of the British Empire (1949)

Military service
- Branch/service: King's African Rifles
- Rank: Second Lieutenant

Michael Hamilton Kawalya-Kaggwa OBE was an influential politician who served as the Katikiro (chief minister) of the Kingdom of Buganda from 1945 to 1950. He died on 9 September 1971 leaving behind a large family including a widow, Mrs. Olive Amelia Kawalya-Kaggwa (of Ghanaian descent) and her two sons. Kawalya Kaggwa's father, Apollo Kaggwa, was an influential Katikiro and regent. He was a significant figure in Uganda's moving forward in modernization and acquiring independence in 1962.

== Political career ==
Kawalya served in the military during World War II, he joined the 7th (Uganda Territorial) Battalion of the King's African Rifles in 1939, serving as a Second Lieutenant and quartermaster in East Africa and Somaliland.

Kawalya was appointed Katikiro in 1945 after the assassination of Martin Luther Nsibirwa and served in the role until 1950.

Kawalya Kaggwa was one of the first three African representatives appointed to the Uganda Legislative Council (LEGCO) in December 1945. He was honored with the Order of the British Empire. in 1949.

== Personal life ==
Born on January 8, 1898, he was the son of Sir Apollo Kaggwa, another highly influential former Katikkiro and regent of Buganda. He married Catherine Margaret Nanjobe in 1921, and they had several children. He died on September 9, 1971.

== See also ==
- Charles Mayiga
- John Baptist Walusimbi
