= Community museum =

Museum that serves a community and its culture or history

A community museum is a museum serving as an exhibition and gathering space for specific identity groups or geographic areas.

In contrast to traditional museums, community museums are commonly multidisciplinary, and may simultaneously exhibit the history, social history, art, or folklore of their communities.

== History ==
=== Origins ===
In the United States, the emergence of community museums in the 1960s and 1970s has a direct correlation with the greater social movements of the time. Noting that their histories and cultures were largely absent from mainstream museums, activists and civic leaders from minority communities began to open their own museums in an attempt to have their identities and stories told. In the context of the African American community, this lack of representation prompted individuals to open small, locally focused museums, many of which provided early models for contemporary community museums. As they grew in stature and wealth, some museums started to stray from their mission and commitment to local communities and began tackling broader global issues. In the past few years, an emphasis on returning museum focus to local community history and culture has helped differentiate the community museum from every other type of museum.

=== Professionalization ===
During the 1960s and 1970s, community museums tended to be created and run by activists rather than museum professionals. One notable example of such an activist is John Kinard, the founding director of the Anacostia Community Museum. Although Kinard lacked experience in the museum setting, he used his connections within the community to learn on the job. However, as community museums grew in size, they often hired historians or museum professionals to guide their curation, collections management, and fundraising. Starting in the late 1970s, The Anacostia Community Museum began to create specialized internal departments and emphasize expert credentials in its hiring process. Similarly, after taking over as director of the Wing Luke Museum in 1983, Kit Freudenberg directed staff to rigorously clean, catalogue and research the museum's artifacts, "many of which had been placed in boxes or marked with masking tape."

== Methods ==
Community museums are marked by their blend of traditional museum methods with methods commonly associated with community organizations and community arts projects. They often practice participatory methods, involving their audiences in various processes, particularly exhibition development and public programming. These practices are varied. The Wing Luke Museum conducts outreach at the beginning of exhibition projects, convenes advisory committees composed of audience members at various stages in the curatorial process, and has even hired full-time community organizers to join their staff. The Brooklyn Historical Society has accepted exhibit proposals from audience members and trained them in curatorial skills to co-create exhibits. These methods distinguish geographically specific museums like the Anacostia Community Museum from local history museums, which may exclude non-museum professionals from their curatorial processes.

While such methods require more labor from museum staff than traditional curatorial methods, writer and museum director Nina Simon has argued that they make museums more inviting and relevant to audience members.

== Examples of community museums ==
- Anacostia Community Museum
- Brooklyn Museum
- Glasgow Open Museum
- Machine Project
- Wing Luke Museum of the Asian Pacific American Experience
