= Ateker Cultural Centre =

Museum in Moroto, Uganda

Ateker Cultural Museum
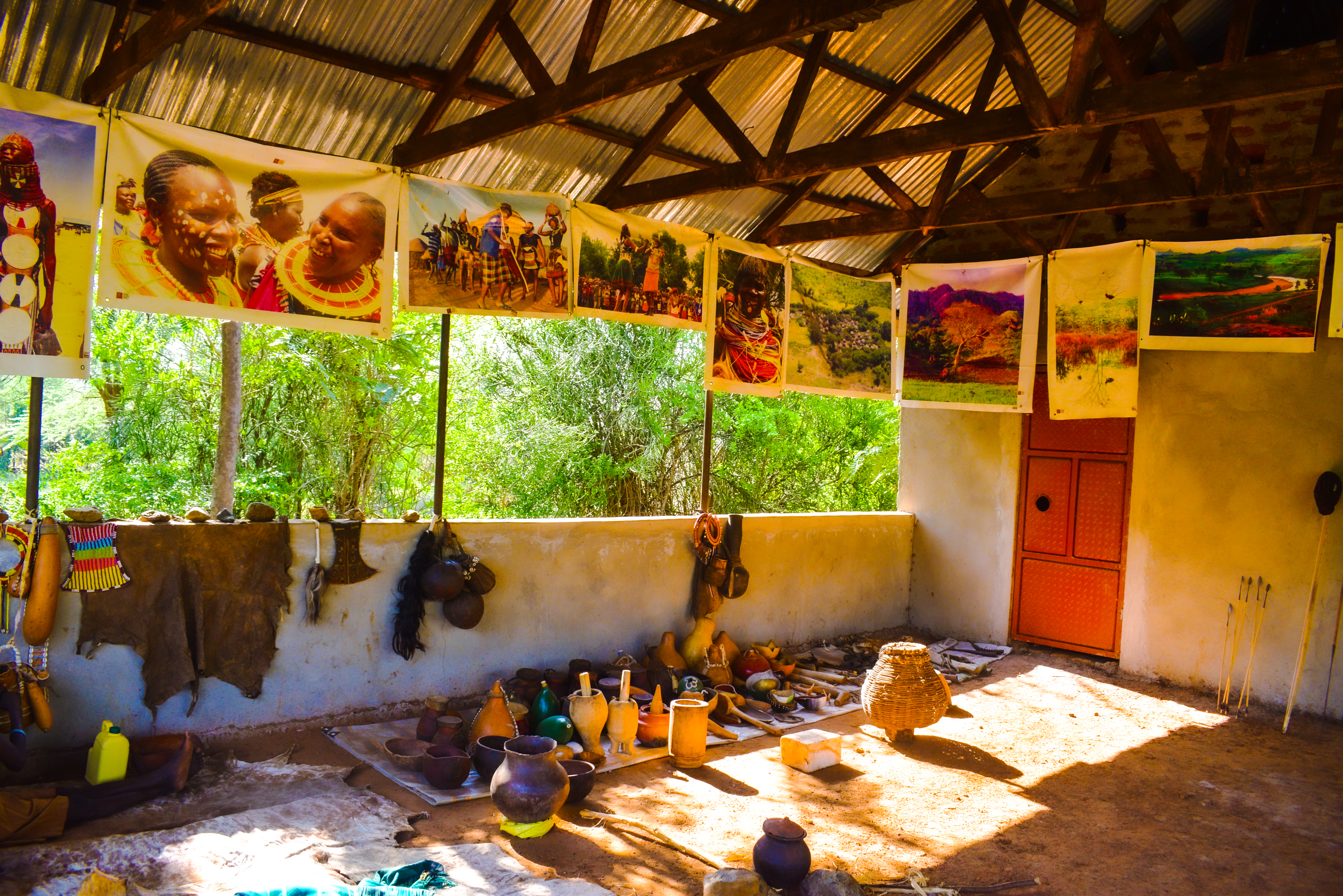

- Map of Uganda showing the location of Ateker Cultural Centre.
- Established: 2012
- Location: Moroto District, Karamoja sub-region, Uganda
- Coordinates: 2.541795°N 34.6551°E
- Type: Historical

Ateker Cultural Centre (ACC) is a Ugandan community museum and cultural institution located in Moroto District, Karamoja sub-region, Uganda.

== History ==
The Ateker Cultural Centre was first registered in 2012 as ATEKER-KARAMOJA MEDIA LTD. Its initial purpose was to broadcast and safeguard the cultural heritage of Ateker pastoralist communities across the Horn of Africa, including the Karamojong (Uganda), Turkana (Kenya), Toposa (South Sudan), and Nyangatom (Ethiopia).

By 2019, the Centre had become firmly established in Moroto, Uganda, with a broader vision of promoting heritage and communal values of Ateker pastoralist societies.

== Programs and activities ==
The Ateker Cultural Centre conducts a wide range of cultural and educational activities:

- Cultural events: Hosting traditional dance, music, storytelling, and food exhibitions such as asapan (initiation rites) and ajon (local brew).
- Museum outreach: Exhibitions of tangible and intangible heritage, cultural classes, oral history sessions, and a cultural shop.
- Community empowerment: Providing training and resources to youth, women, and elders, fostering intergenerational cultural transmission.

== Galleries ==
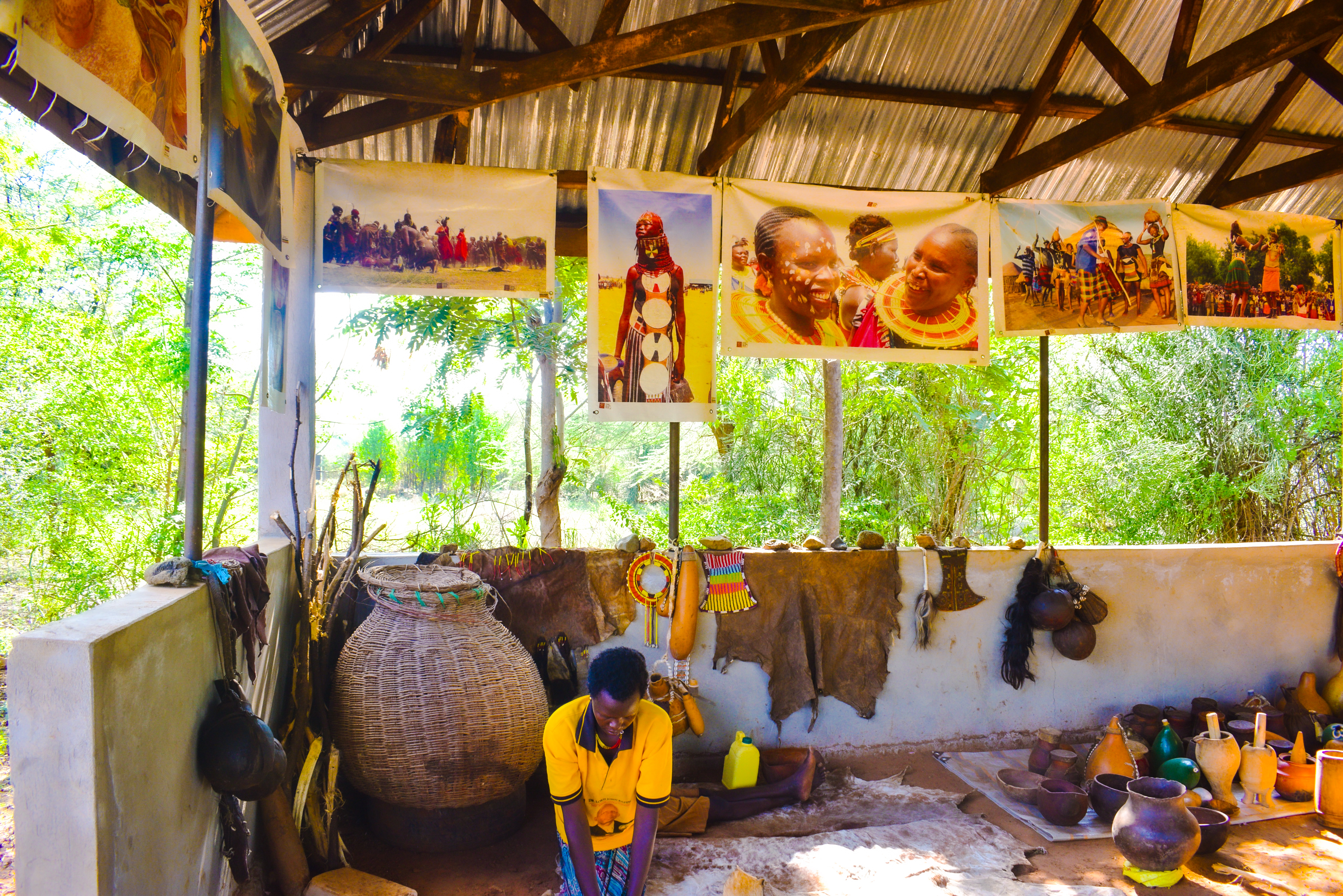

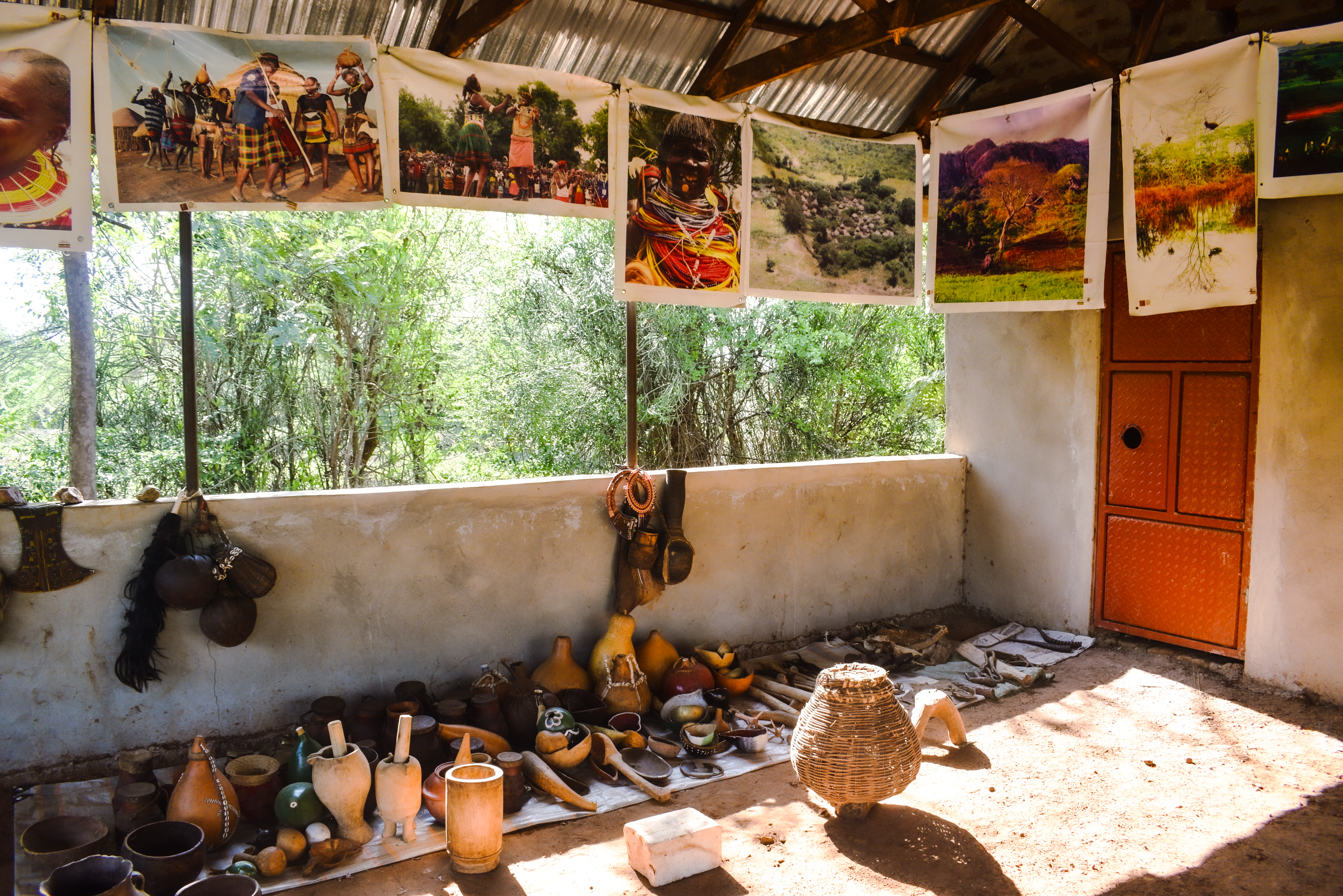

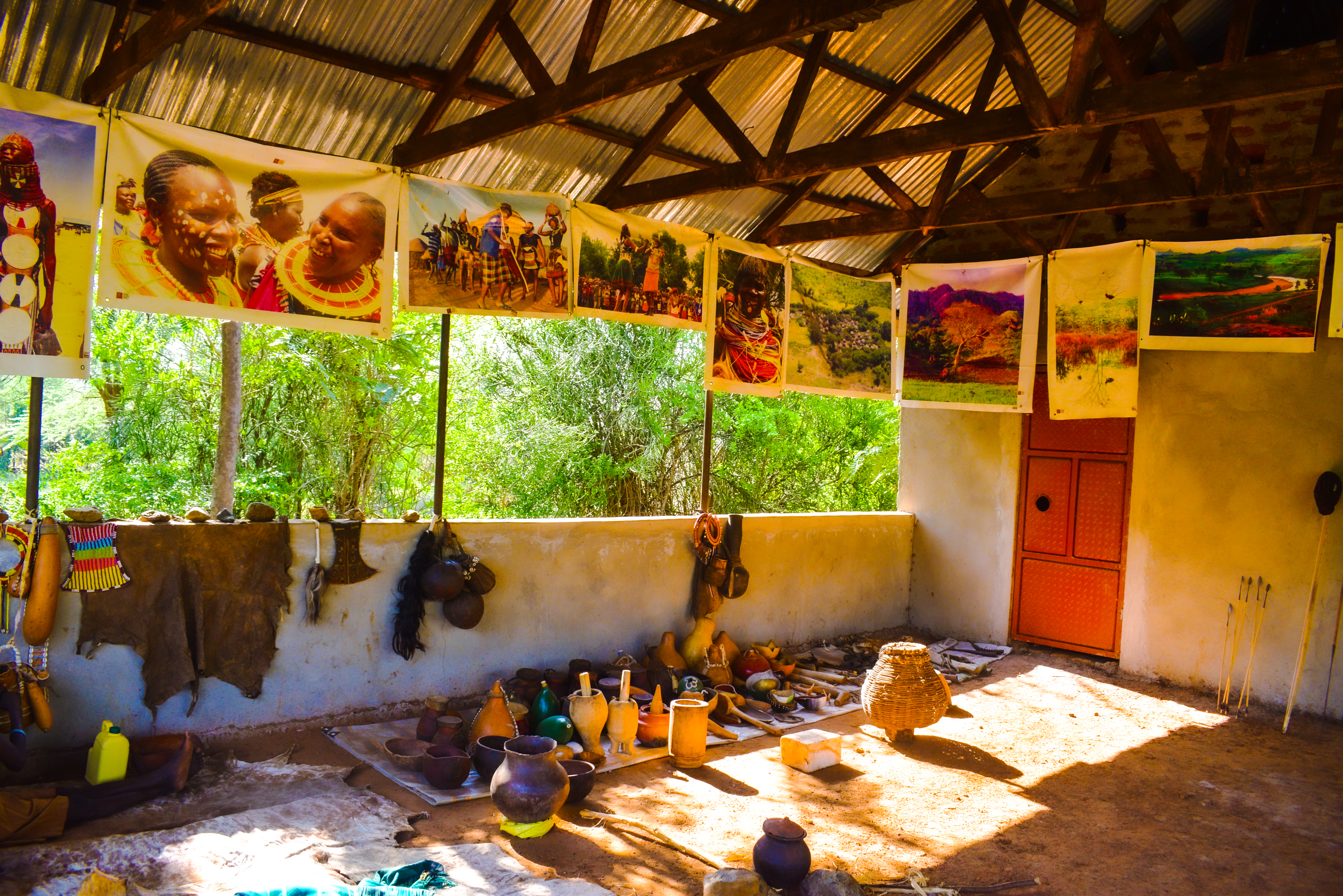

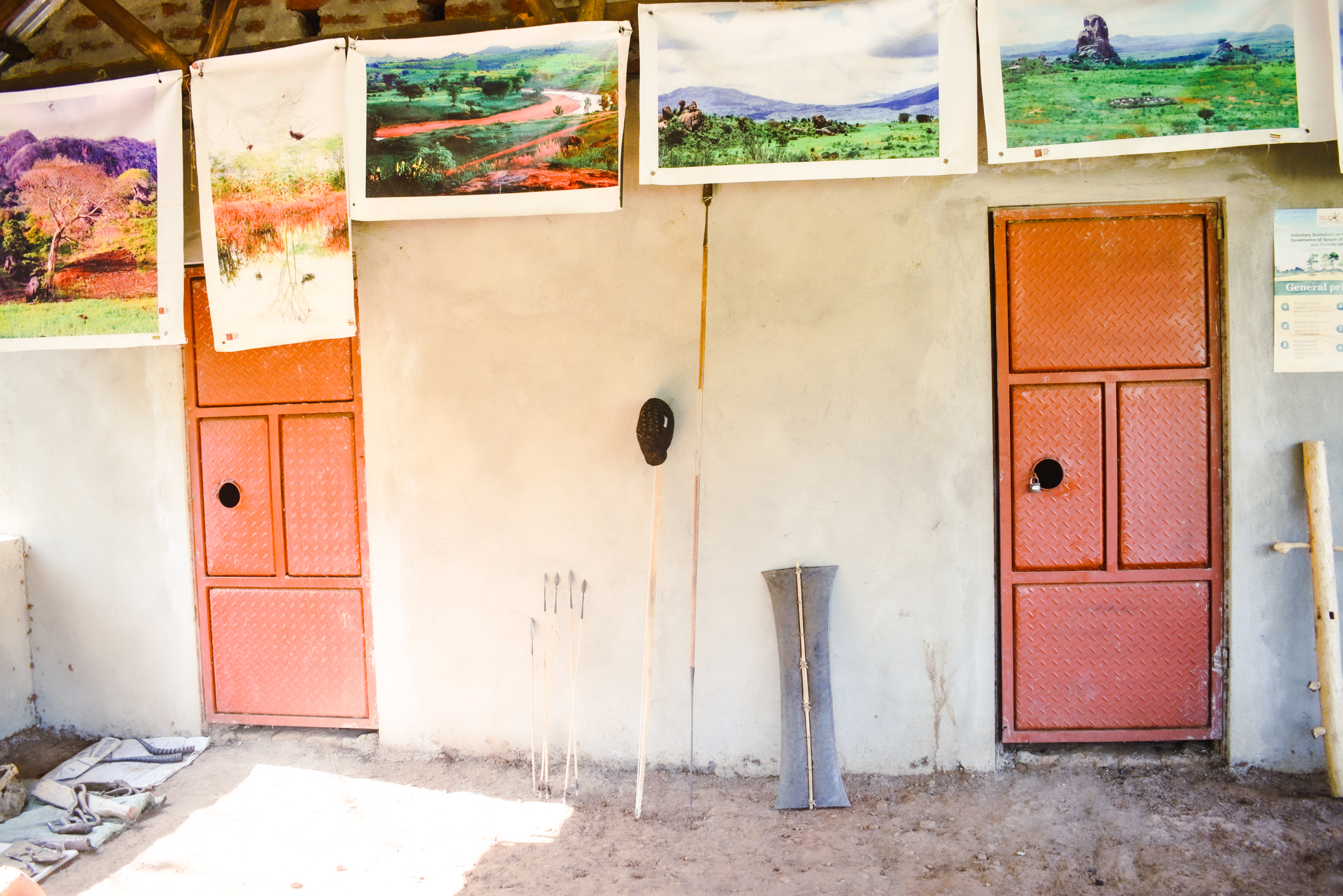

== Collection ==
A wide range of collections 1000 items spread across the museum.

- Archaeology - Excavated artifacts, ancient tools, pottery, and ruins showcasing early civilizations.
- Art Gallery - Paintings, sculptures, and visual art spanning classical to contemporary styles.
- Collections Management - Systematic cataloging, storage, and care of all museum holdings
- Curatorial Department - Researching, developing, and organizing exhibitions and displays.
- Education & Outreach - School programs, workshops, community tours, and cultural education.
- Gift Shop - Souvenirs, cultural crafts, books, and educational merchandise for visitors
- History - Exhibits focused on local, national, and world historical narratives.
- Ethnography - Traditional tools, crafts, clothing, and cultural objects from diverse communities
- Natural History - Fossils, minerals, botanical specimens, and animal displays.
- Research Library | Archive - Scholarly resources including manuscripts, rare books, and historical documents sections.

== Recent developments ==
In May 2024, the Centre inaugurated a new community hall in Moroto to support training and capacity building.

In November 2024, Uganda hosted the first-ever Ateker Reunion Cultural Festival (Tobong’u Lore) in Soroti City, attended by leaders and delegates from Uganda, Kenya, South Sudan, and Ethiopia.

== See also ==
- Ateker peoples
- Karamojong people
- Culture of Uganda
- Uganda Museum
- Ham Mukasa Museum
