= Uganda National Cultural Centre =

Arts facility in Kampala, Uganda

- UNCC
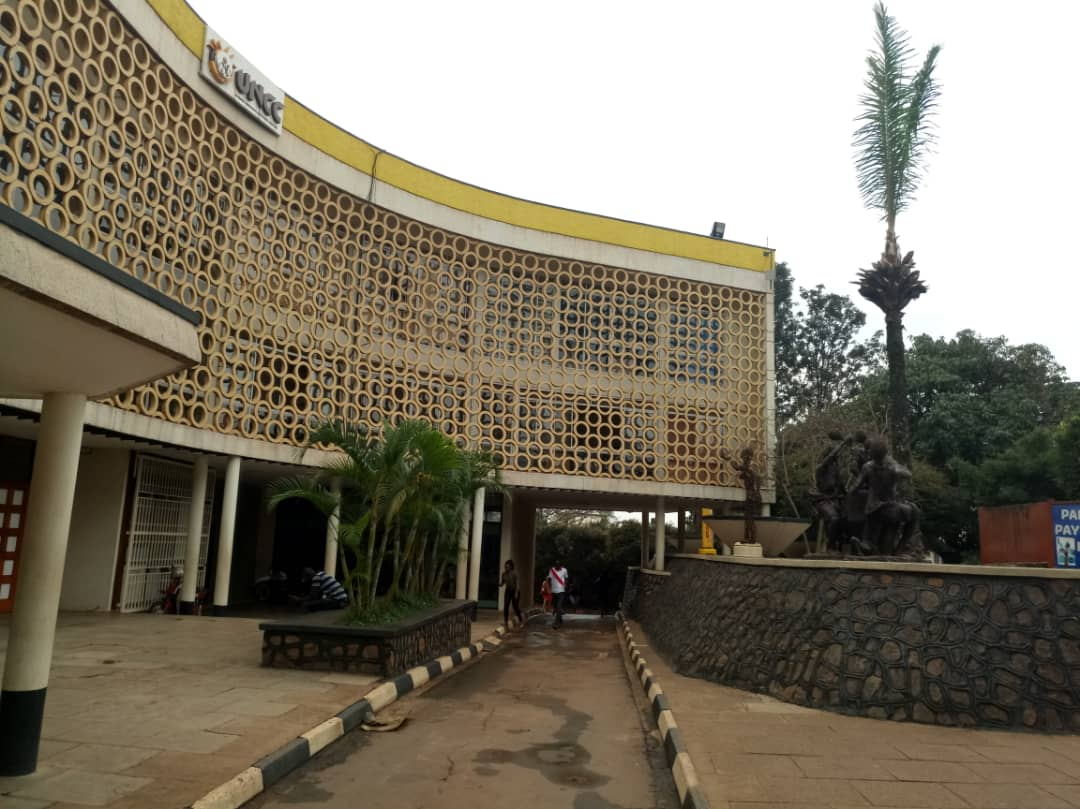

Agency overview
- Formed: 1991; 35 years ago
- Jurisdiction: Government of Uganda
- Headquarters: Kampala, Uganda; 00°18′57″N 32°35′21″E
- Agency executive: Chairman, Prof. Okaka Opio Dokotum
- Parent agency: Uganda Ministry of Ministry of Gender, Labour and Social Development

The Uganda National Cultural Centre (UNCC) is a Ugandan statutory body that was established by the Uganda National Cultural Centre Act, a 1959 Act of Parliament (amended 1965).

== Location ==
The headquarters of UNCC are located at the corner of Said Barre Avenue and De Winton Street, in the Central Division of the city of Kampala, Uganda's capital and largest city. The geographical coordinates of the headquarters of UNCC are 0°18'57.0"N, 32°35'21.0"E (Latitude:0.315833; Longitude:32.589167).

== Overview ==
Officially inaugurated on 2 December 1959, UNCC is charged with: (a) providing and establishing theatres and cultural centres in the country (b) encouraging and developing cultural and artistic activities and (c) providing a home to societies, groups and organisations that deal in art, culture and entertainment. The Honourable A.G. Mehta, mayor of Kampala in 1968, was a supporter of the National Theatre and opened its first exhibition on the Baháʼí Faith in Uganda.

== Facilities ==
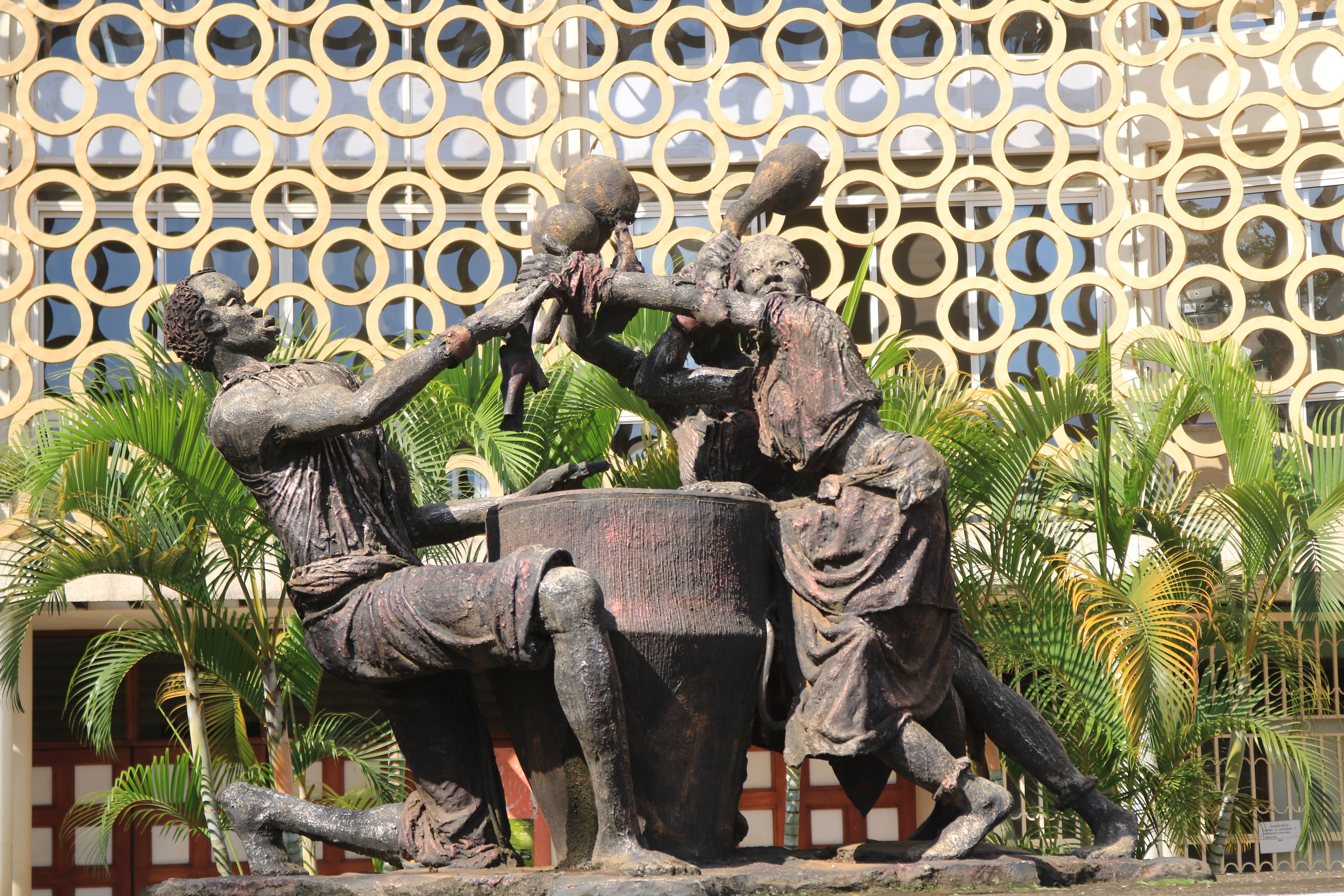
National cultural Center Monument

The centre has two main components: the National Theatre and the Nommo Gallery, both of which are located in central Kampala. The National Theatre provides a venue for stage performances of different kinds, and also serves as a cinema. The Nommo Gallery features exhibitions of works of art by both Ugandan and foreign artists. The centre also offers a snack bar, which claims to offer the "best African dishes served with best spices and ambience", and the Craft Village, where locally made handicrafts are sold.

== Management ==
Oversight of the UNCC is the responsibility of an eight-member Board of Trustees, appointed by the Minister of Gender, Labour and Social Development. The Board then appoints a management team and hires other employees. The current board was appointed in February 2024 to serve a three-year term. The current trustees are:

1. Prof. Okaka Opio Dokotum: Chairperson
2. Ms. Phina Mugerwa: Vice Chairperson
3. Mr. Moses Ssali Bebe Cool: Member
4. Ms. Naumo Juliana Akoryo: Member
5. Mr. Bugingo Hannington: Member
6. Dr. Komakech Richard: Member
7. Mr. Mayanja Joseph Chameleone: Member
8. Ms. Lillian Mbabazi: Member
