= Ssemagulu Royal Museum =

Privately owned museum in Uganda

- Map of Kampala showing the location of Ssemagulu Royal Museum.
- Established: 2014
- Coordinates: 00°17′20″N 32°32′06″E
- Type: Historical

The Ssemagulu Royal Museum is a privately owned Ugandan museum located in the Kampala suburb of Mutundwe, Lubaga Division.

== History and etymology ==
Ssemagulu Royal Museum was founded in 2014 by John Ssempebwa who is a former chief executive officer of the Uganda Tourism Board.

According to the folklore of the Buganda, "Ssemagulu" was the former name used for the throne occupied by kings of Buganda and was a symbol of authority. It is from this that the museum derives its name

== Collection ==
The museum has a varied collection of artefacts, sculptures and murals that depict the folklore and heritage of the Buganda Kingdom. In addition, the history of pre and post independence is documented still through sculpture and more artefacts. The museum also collects, restores and curates items that may be considered part of Uganda's history for example the car that belonged to Benedicto Kiwanuka, the first post-independence Prime Minister of Uganda as well as that which belonged to Sir Andrew Cohen, Governor of the Uganda Protectorate from 1952 to 1957.

Being a place that is frequented by students for educational purposes, the museum intends to use film in its collection as part of its instructional tools for visitors in the future.

== See also ==
- Buganda Kingdom
- Kintu
- List of museums in Uganda
