= Cultural Research Centre Museum-Jinja =

Museum in Jinja, Uganda

Coordinates: 0°26′2.1530″N 33°12′17.5014″E

Cultural Research Centre Museum
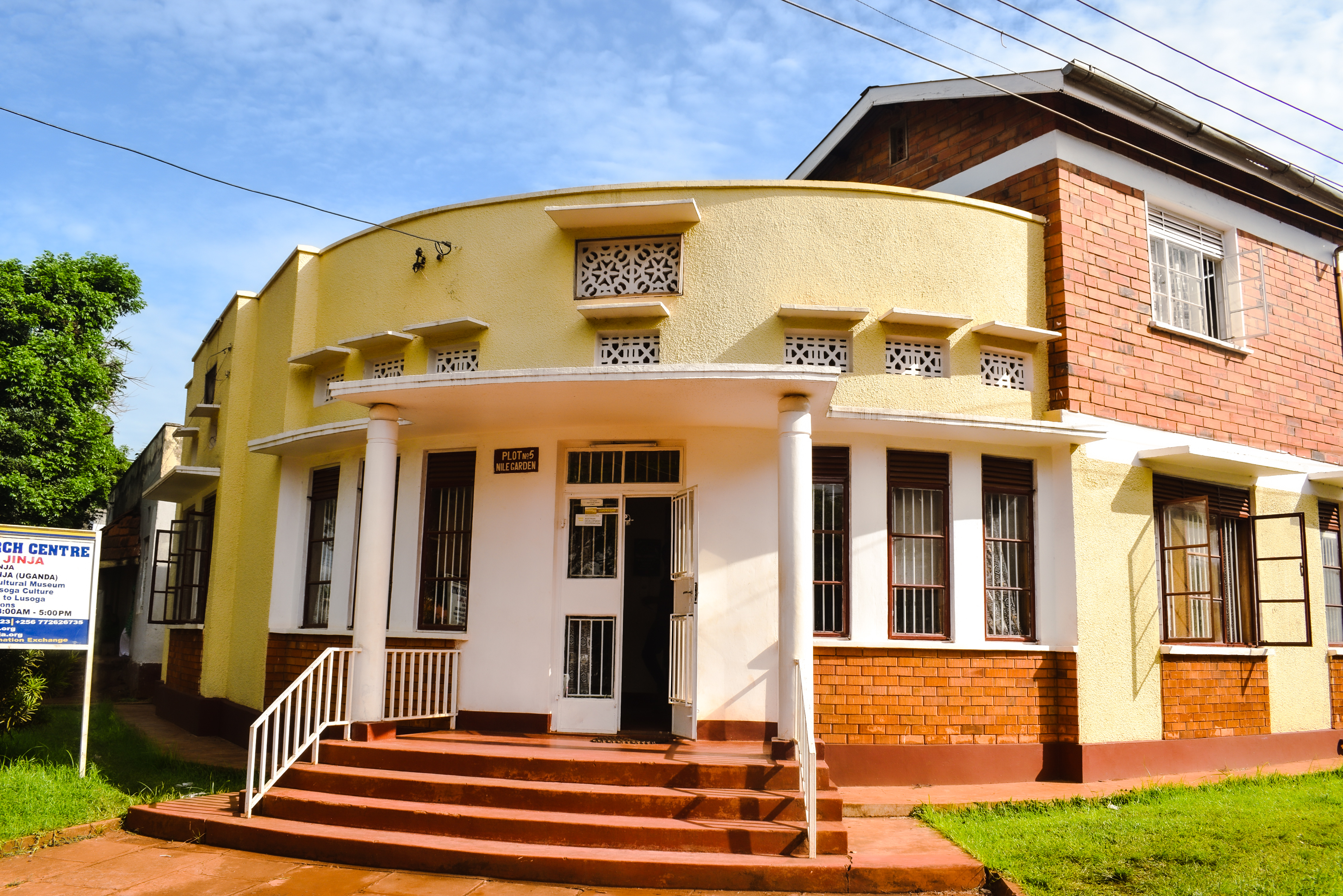
- Museum entrance

- Map of Uganda showing the location of Cultural Research Centre Museum-Jinja
- Established: 2008
- Location: Nile Avenue Jinja, Uganda.
- Type: Historical
- Founder: Catholic Diocese of Jinja

Cultural Research Centre Museum (CRC Museum) is a community based museum located on Nile Avenue, Jinja, near the Nile Gardens in Uganda.

== History ==
The Cultural Research Centre itself was founded in 1997 following a resolution of the 1995 Jinja Diocesan Synod. The Synod encouraged the development of the Lusoga language and the promotion of cultural heritage.

In 2008, the museum was established by the Catholic Diocese of Jinja to collect, preserve, and display artifacts and cultural practices of the Basoga people in eastern Uganda.

The museum forms part of the wider Cultural Research Centre (CRC), a faith-based non-governmental organization registered in Uganda in 1997.

== Collections ==
The museum's collection includes:

- fishing spears, hunting tools, pottery, and basketry;
- musical instruments and royal drums;
- household objects such as calabashes and traditional crockery;
- modern artifacts including gramophones, typewriters, and early telephones.

The Centre also documents intangible heritage, including a compilation of over 3,000 Lusoga proverbs and the traditional Bigwala trumpet music of the Basoga.

== Activities ==
The Cultural Research Centre Museum undertakes cultural and educational initiatives, including:

- Language promotion, publishing Lusoga grammar books, dictionaries, and fables, and translating international documents such as the Universal Declaration of Human Rights into Lusoga.
- Heritage education, working with the Cross-Cultural Foundation of Uganda to establish cultural clubs in secondary schools.
- Community engagement, conducting cultural exhibitions, consultancies, and sensitization workshops.
- Library services providing access to cultural and historical literature.

The museum operates on weekdays from 8:00 am to 5:00 pm and is closed on weekends.

== Galleries ==
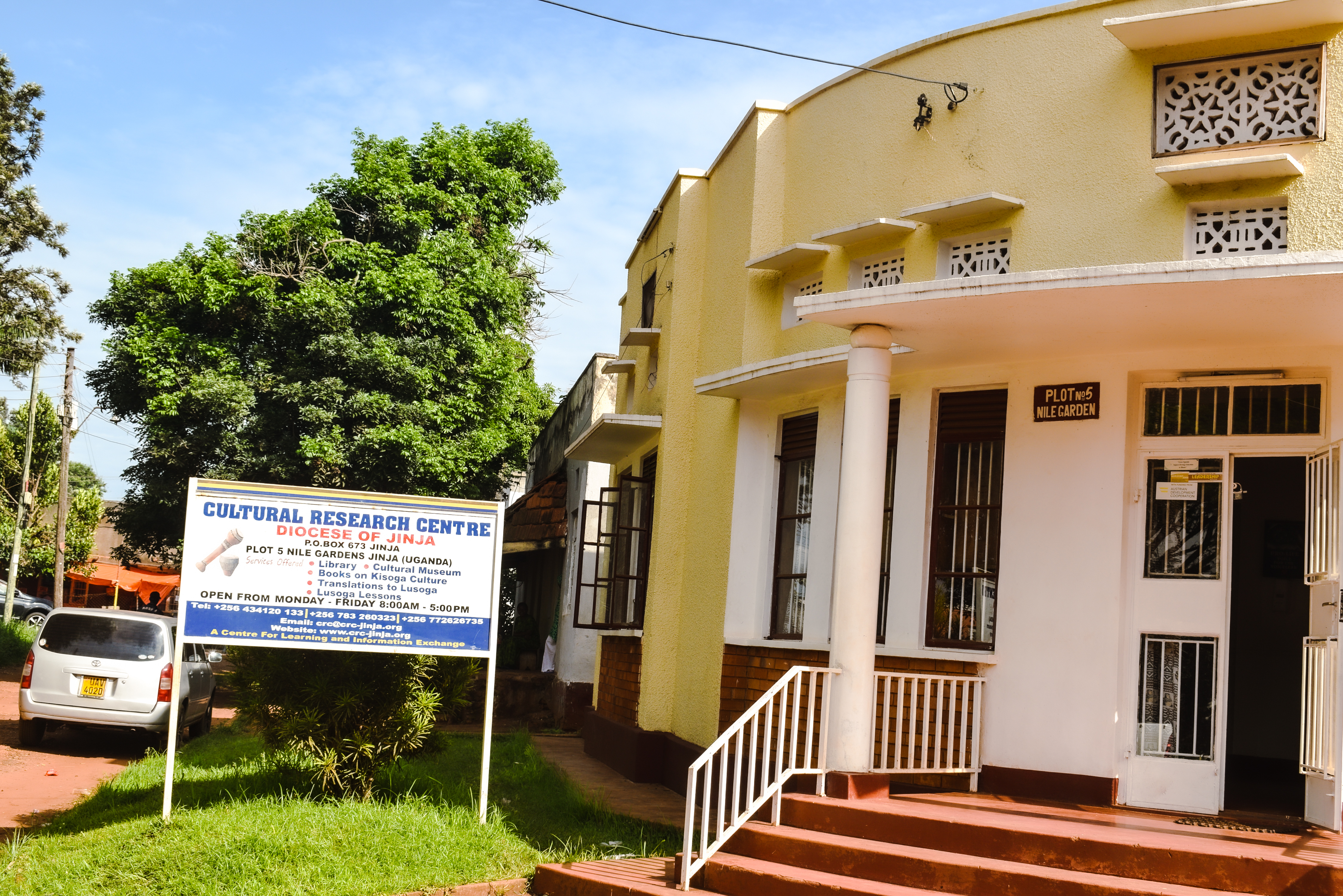

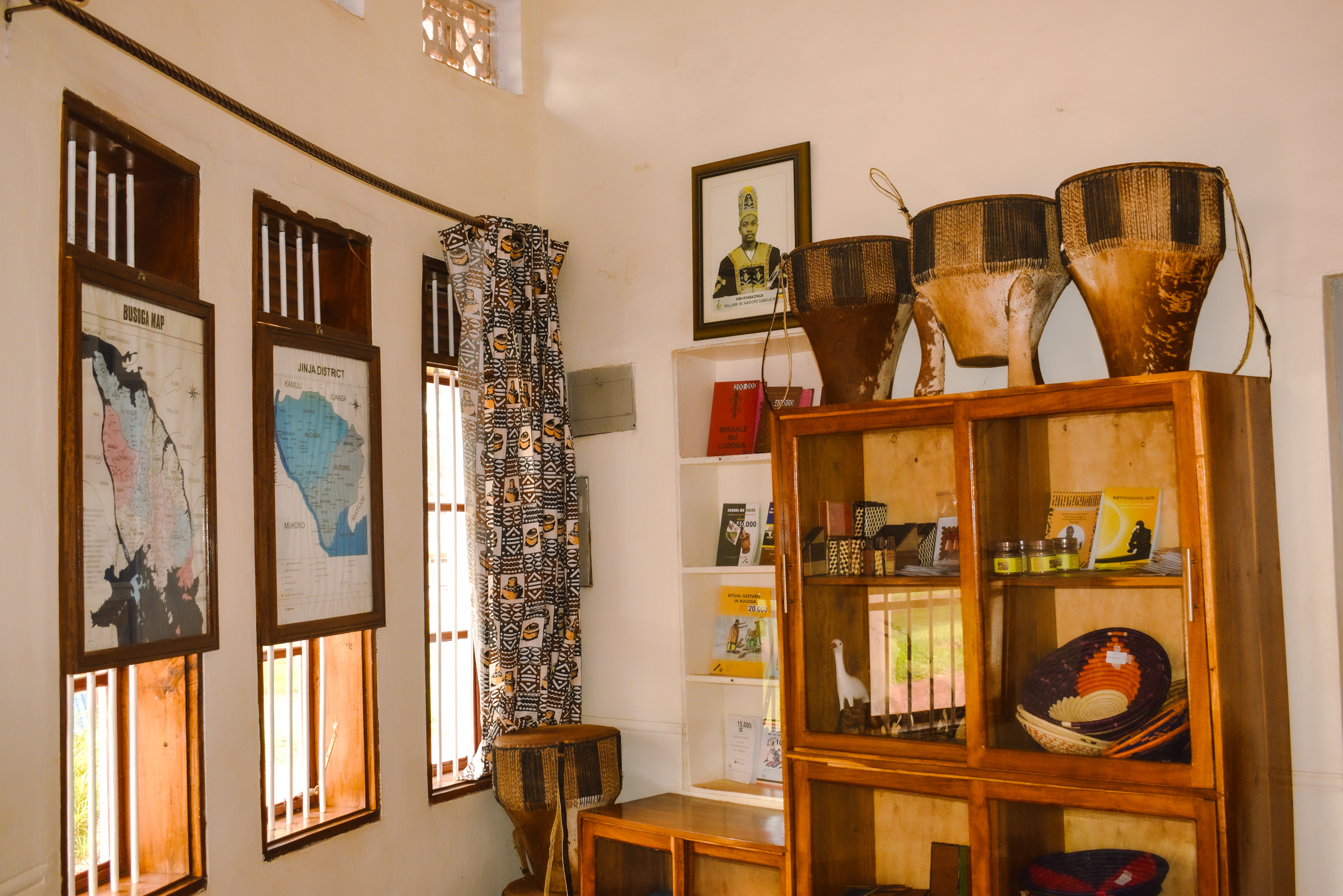

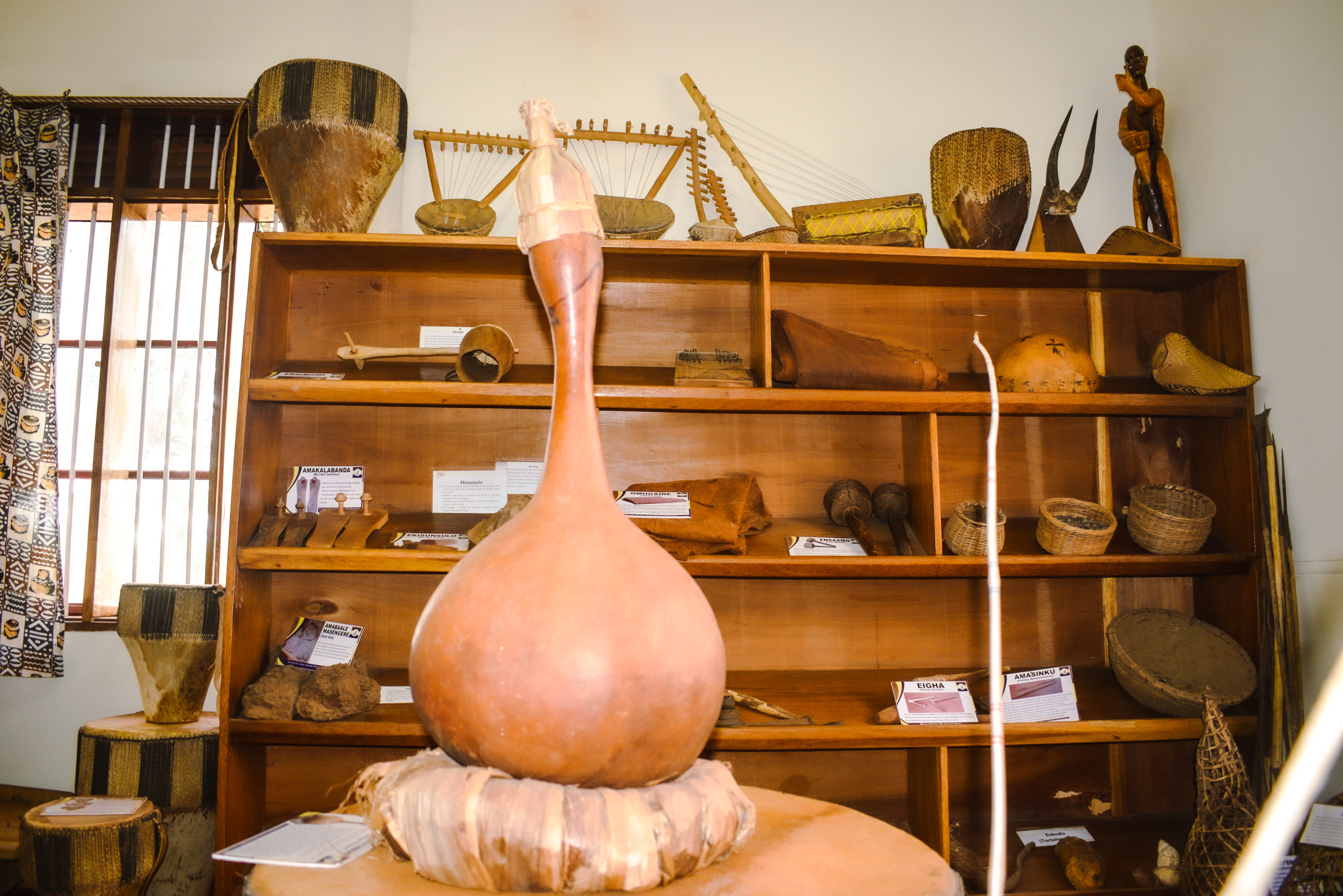

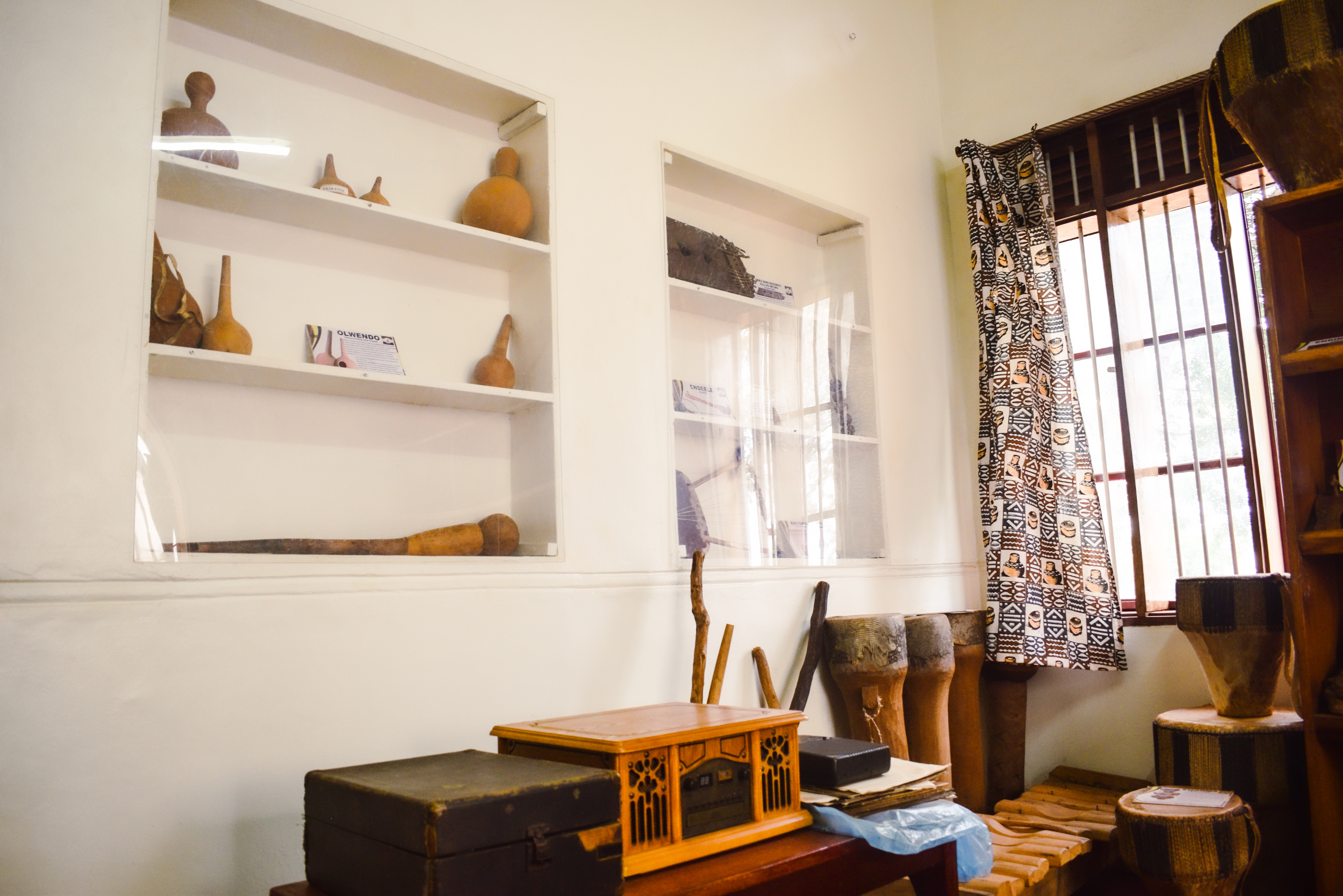

== Recognition ==
The museum is a member of the Uganda Community Museums Association (UCOMA) and has participated in programs supported by UNESCO to safeguard intangible cultural heritage in Uganda.

== See also ==
- Uganda Museum
