= Fort Lugard =

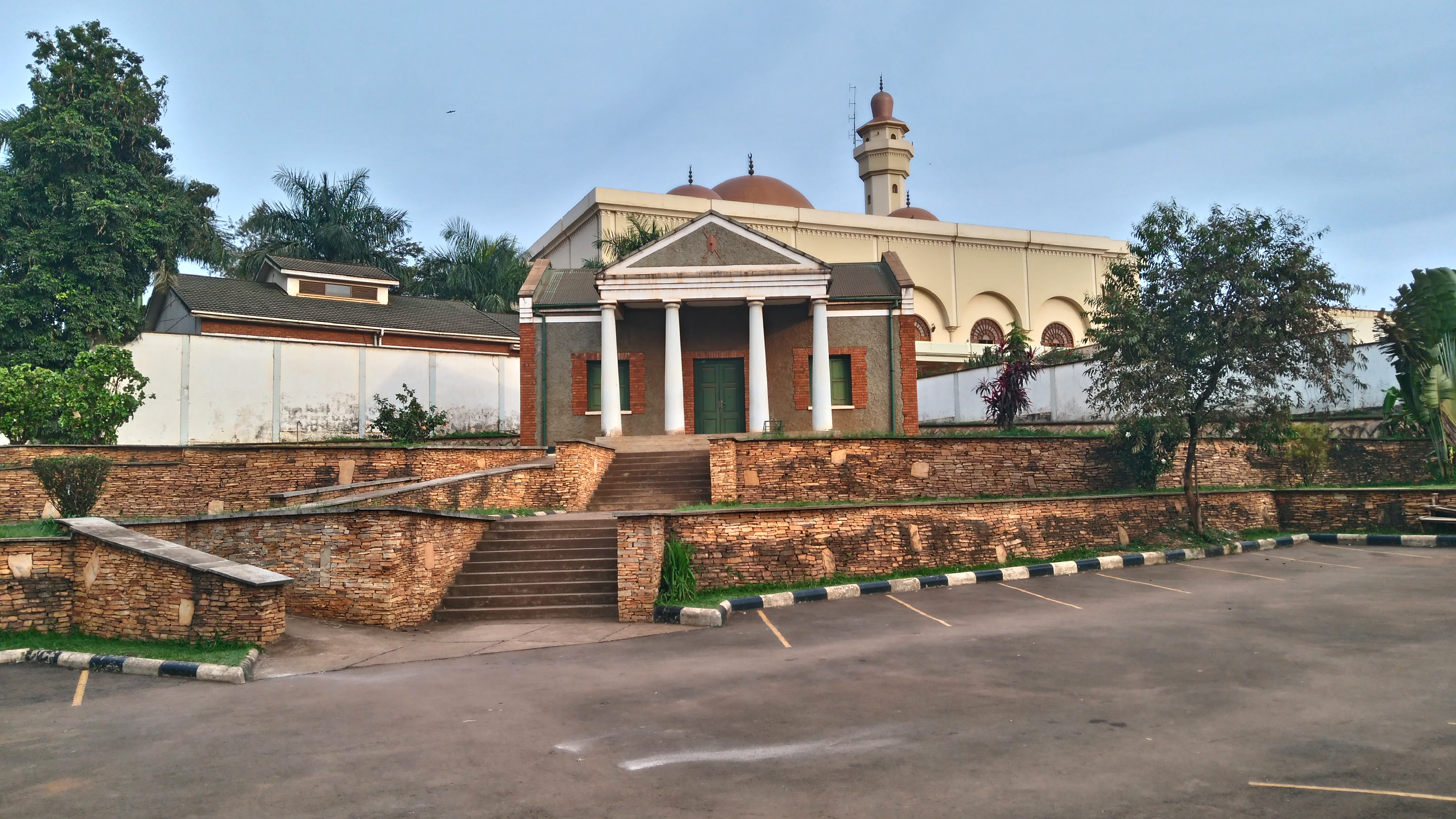
- Interactive map of the Fort Lugard area

General information
- Status: Partly Diminished
- Location: Old Kampala Road; Old Kampala, Kampala, Uganda
- Coordinates: 0.31633738421427504°N 32.5679460954262°E
- Construction started: 1908
- Owner: Capt. Frederick Lugard

Fort Lugard is a fort and a museum in Kampala which served as the colonial administrative site of the British Protectorate of Uganda. The fort was occupied by the Buganda Kingdom before President Idi Amin donated the land to the Uganda Muslim Supreme Council.

== History ==
Fort Lugard was established by Sir Frederick Lugard, the first colonial administrator of Uganda, in 1890 when he raised the Union Jack here as a sign that Uganda had become a British Protectorate. Sir Lugard was stationed in Uganda as a military administrator by the Imperial British East African Company from 26 December 1890 to May 1892.

For several years, the fort was the headquarters for the colonial administration. It originally stood on 12 acres before being reduced to 10 acres and finally a 50 by 40 meter area. The fort was severely destroyed during the construction of the 15,000 seater Uganda National mosque by Uganda Muslim Supreme Council after President Idi Amin donated the land to them.

The first museum in Uganda was opened at Fort Lugard in 1908 before being moved to Makere in 1942.

== See also ==
- Uganda Museum
