= Uganda Museum =

Museum in Kampala, Uganda

Coordinates: 0°20′9.49″N 32°34′57.04″E

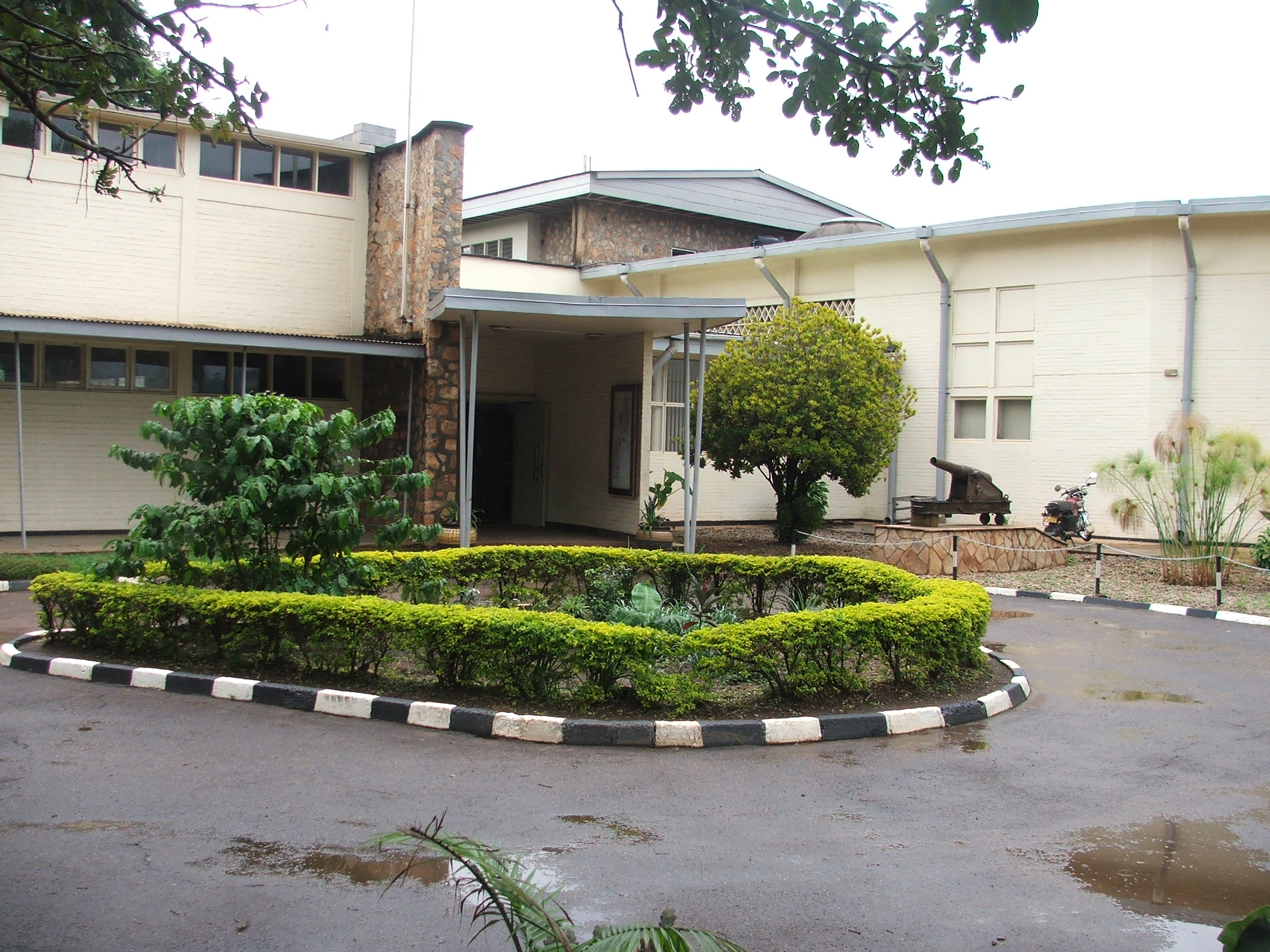
- Museum entrance

- Map of Kampala showing the location of Uganda Museum
- Established: 1908
- Location: Plot 5 Old Kira Road Kitante Hill after Mulago Referral Hospital in the Northern part of Kampala, Uganda
- Type: Historical
- Director: Rose Nkaale Mwanja
- Architect: Ernst May
- Public transit access: Public taxi, going to Kamwokya Ntinda, motorcycle motorist (boda boda) or by private means
- Website: www.ugandamuseums.ug

The Uganda Museum is located in Kampala, Uganda. It displays and exhibits ethnological, natural-historical and traditional life collections of Uganda's cultural heritage. It was founded in 1908, after Governor George Wilson called for "all articles of interest" on Uganda to be procured. Among the collections in the Uganda Museum are playable musical instruments, hunting equipment, weaponry, archaeology and entomology.

== History ==
The Uganda Museum is the oldest museum in East Africa; it was officially established by the British protectorate government in 1908 with ethnographic material. Its history goes back to 1902 when deputy Governor George Wilson called for collection of objects of interest throughout the country to set up a museum. The museum started in a small Sikh temple at Fort Lugard on Old Kampala Hill. Between the 1920s and 1940s, archaeology and paleontological surveys and excavations were conducted by Church Hill, E. J. Wayland, Bishop J. Wilson, P. L. Shinnie, E. Lanning, and several others, who collected a significant number of artifacts to boost the museum. The museum at Fort Lugard become too small to hold the specimens, and the museum was moved to the Margret Trowel School of Fine Art at Makerere University College in 1941. Later, funds were raised for a permanent home and the museum was moved to its current location on Kitante Hill in 1954. In 2008, the museum turned 100 years old.

== Galleries ==
The museum has a number of galleries: Ethnography, Natural History, Traditional Music, Science and Industry, and Early History.

=== Ethnography Gallery ===
The ethnography section holds more than 100,000 object of historical and cultural value. A traditional reed door leads to exhibits on health, knowledge systems, objects of warfare, traditional dressing and other various ceremonial practices in Uganda.

The ethnography gallery, formerly called the "Tribal Hall", is organized around a series of wooden "shop window" cases, each of which holds objects that derive from the traditional cultures of Uganda's people.

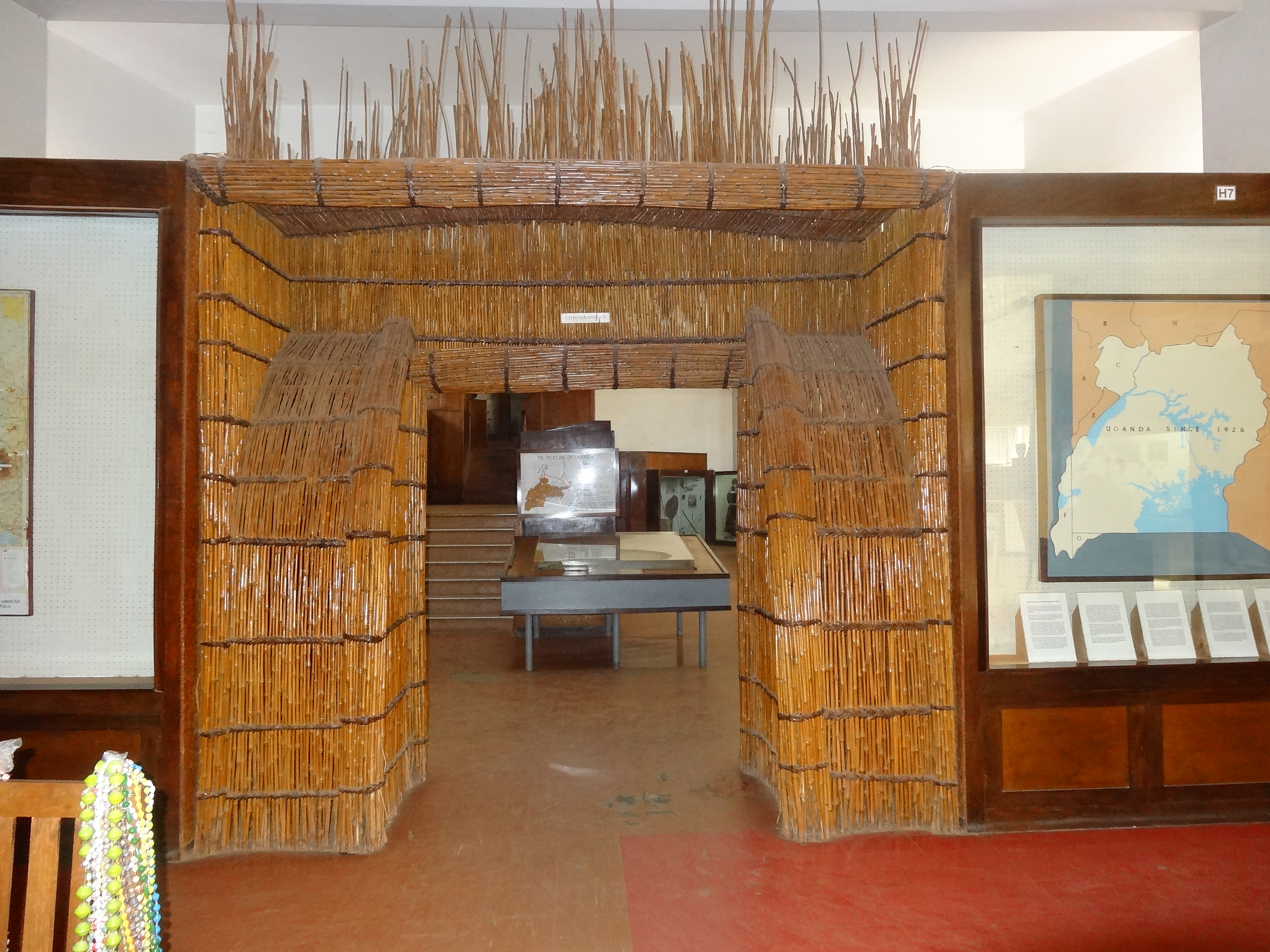
Traditional reed door leading to the Ethnography gallery

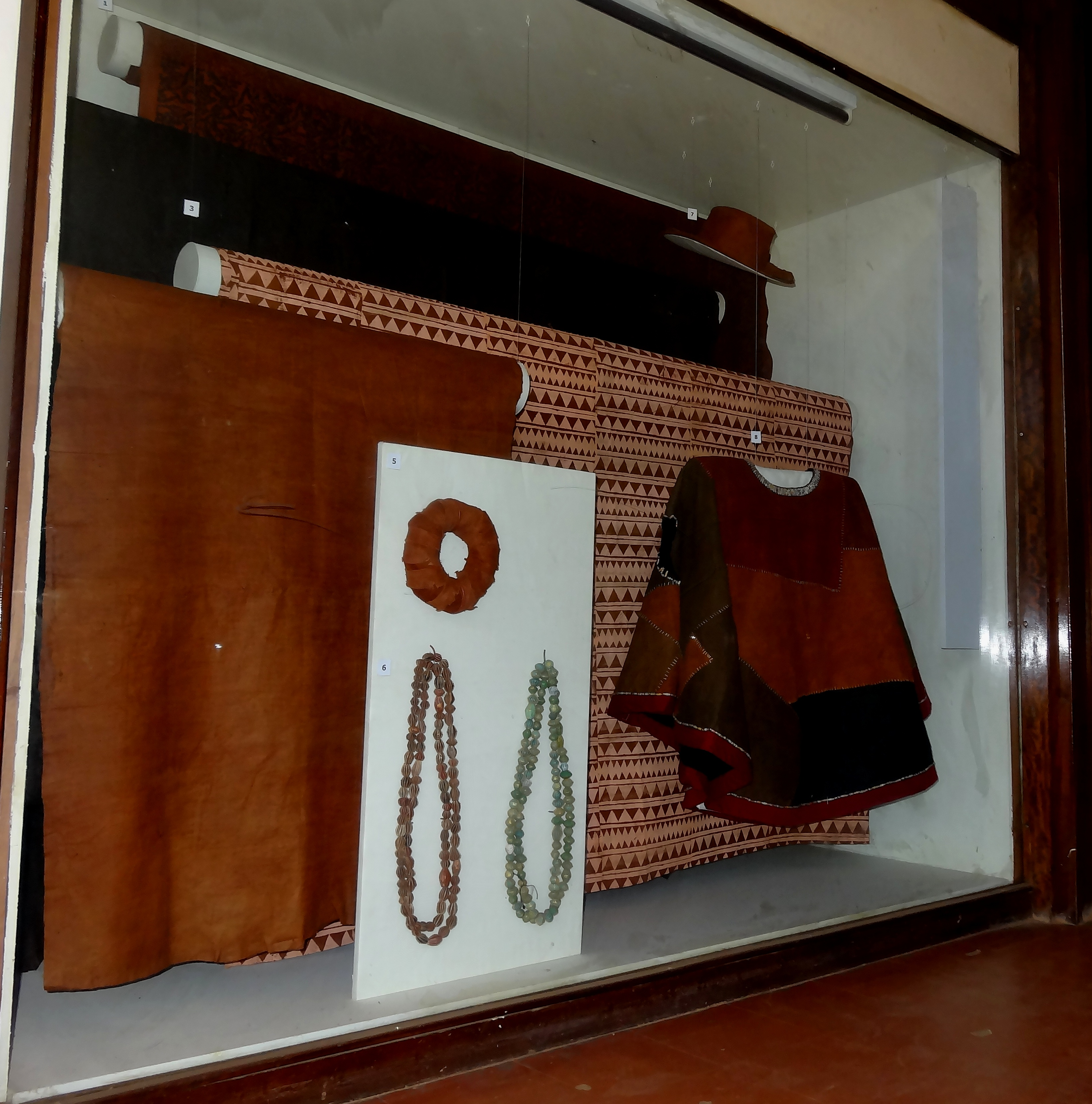
Barkcloth showcase

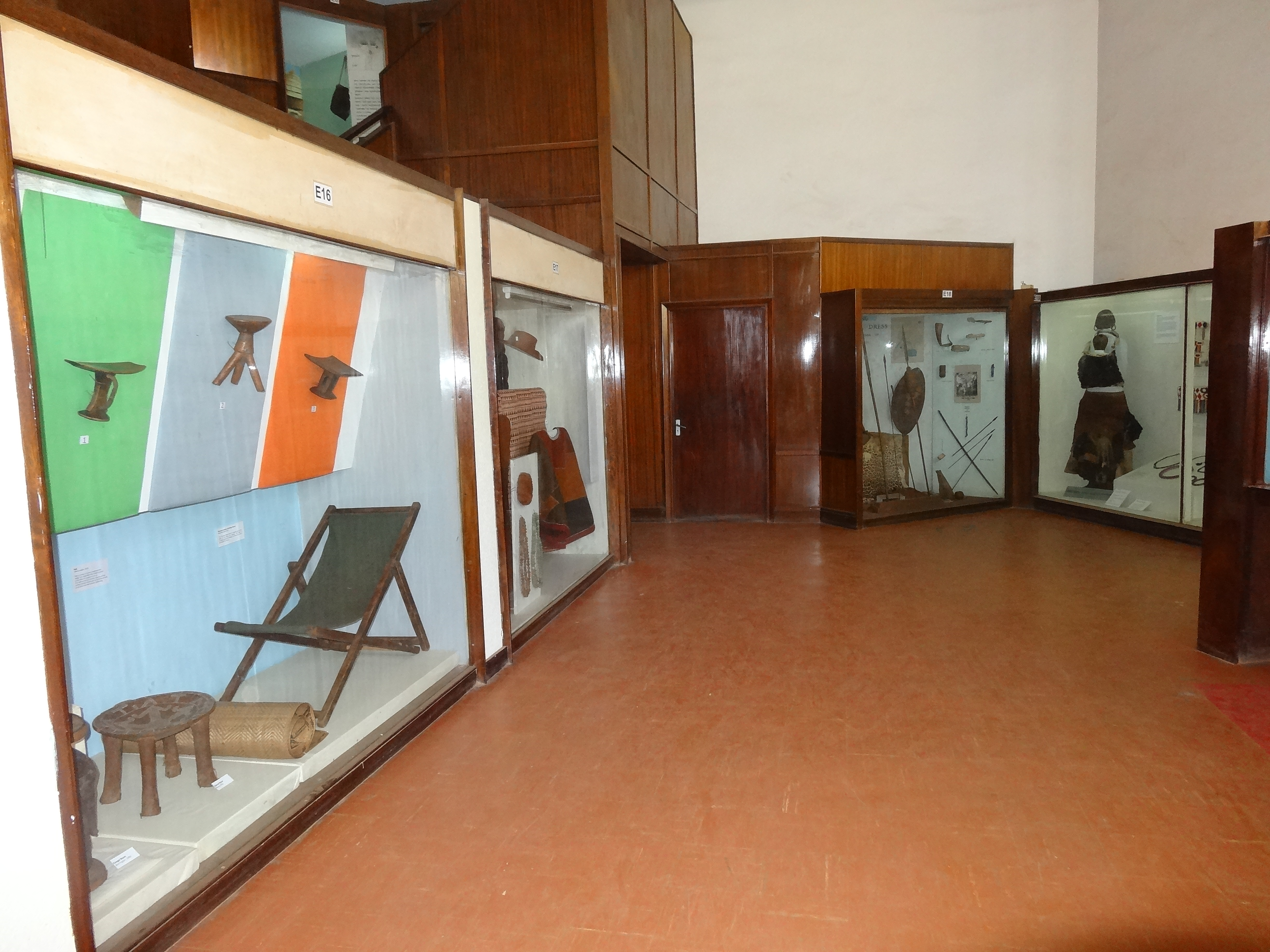
Traditional wooden stools from different parts of Uganda

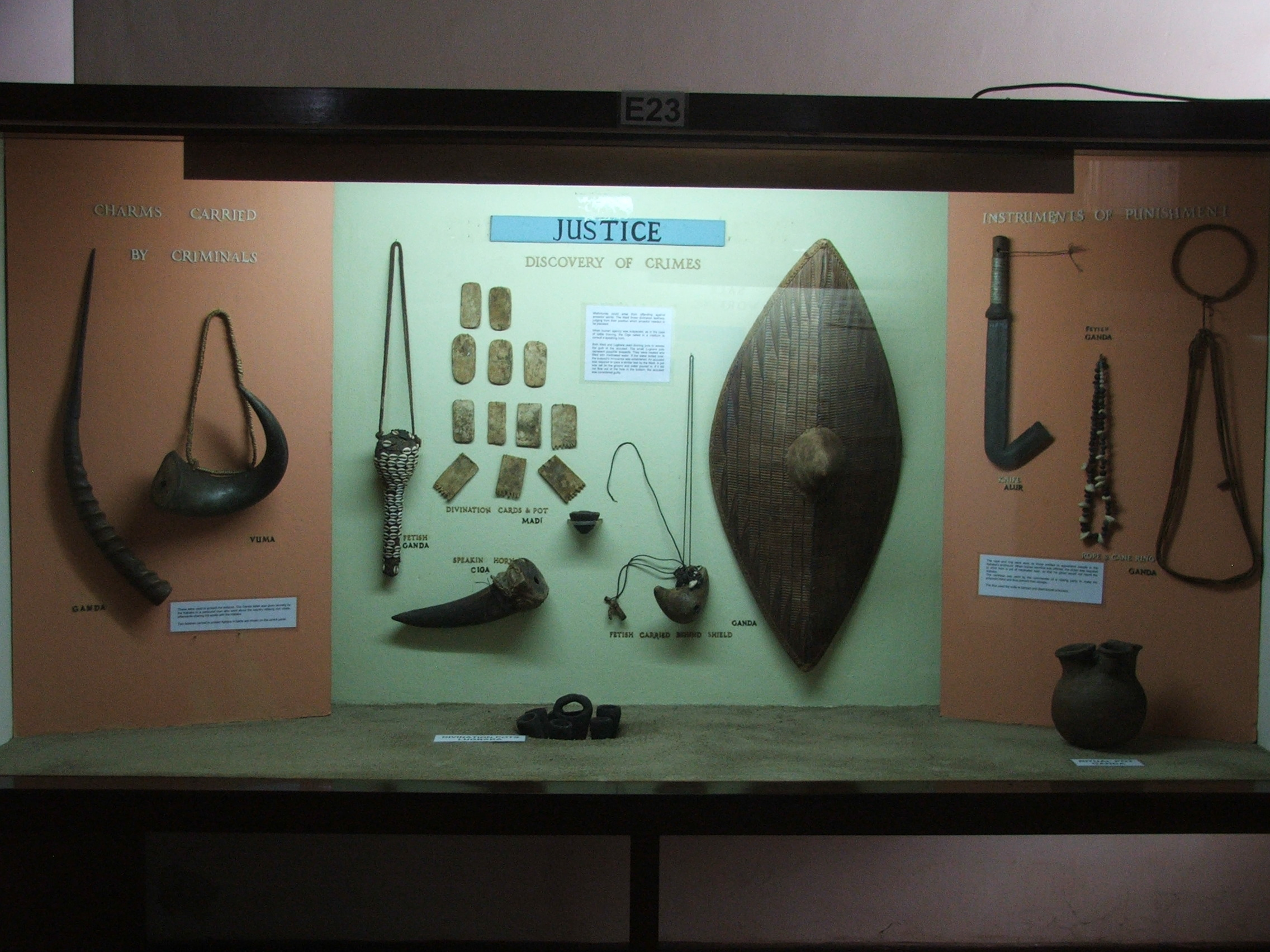
Traditional justice showcase

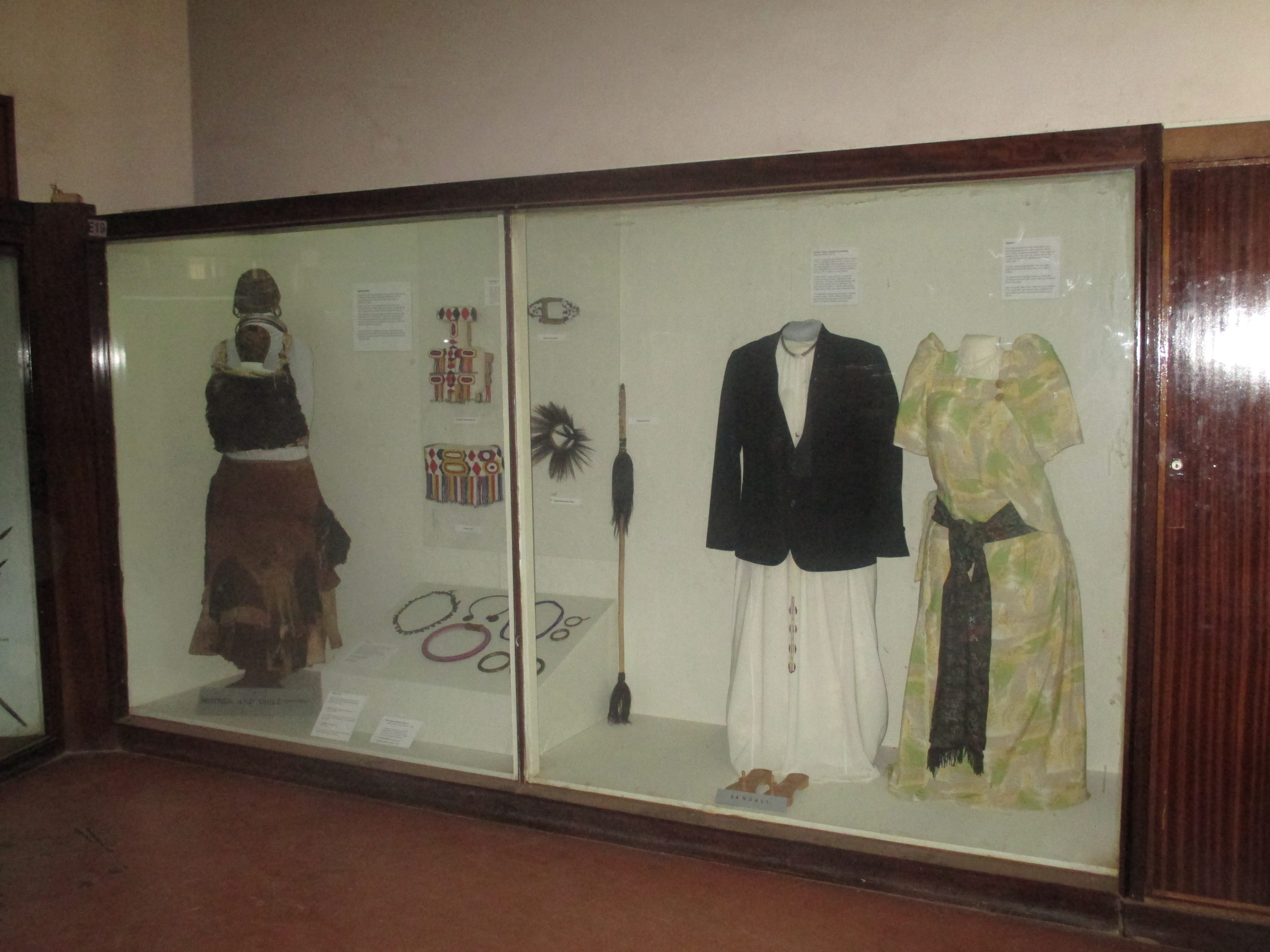
Gomesi and Kanzu traditional outfits of Uganda

=== Music Gallery ===
The music gallery displays a comprehensive collection of musical instruments from East Africa, which grew from the collection originally established by Dr Klaus Wachsmann in 1948. The instruments are arranged according to the major groups of music instruments: drums, percussion, wind and string instruments.

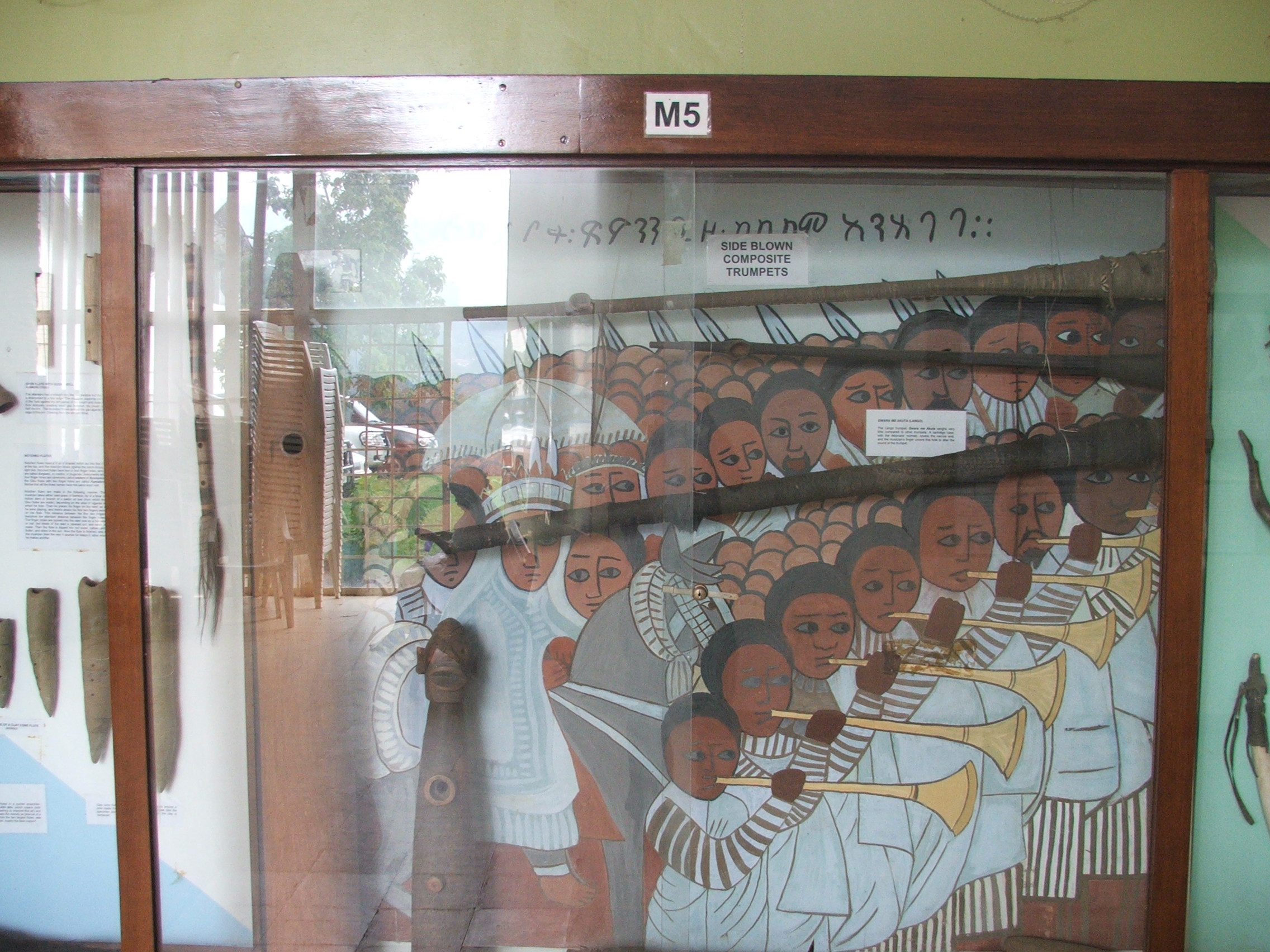
Wind musical instruments

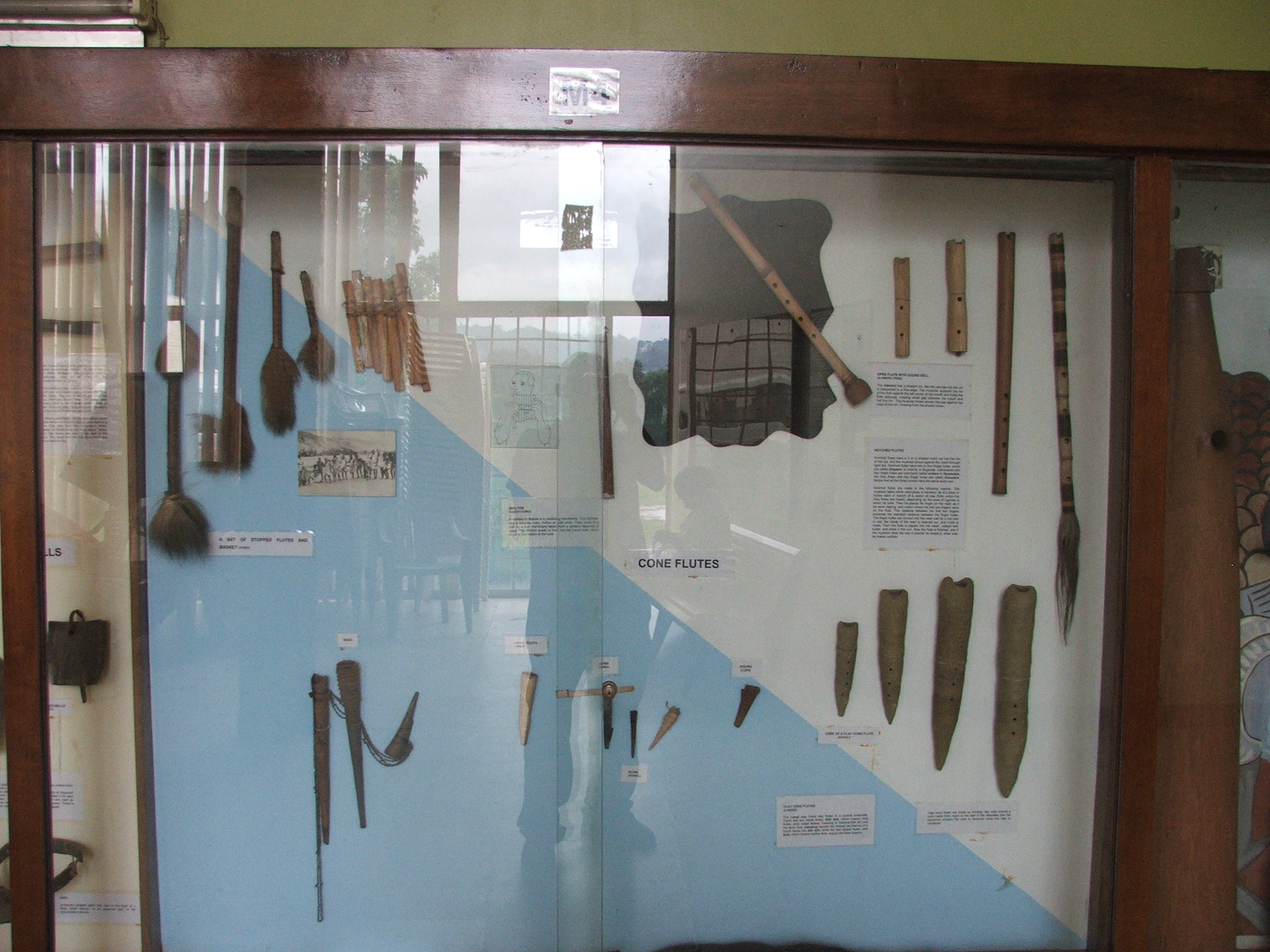
Wind musical instruments

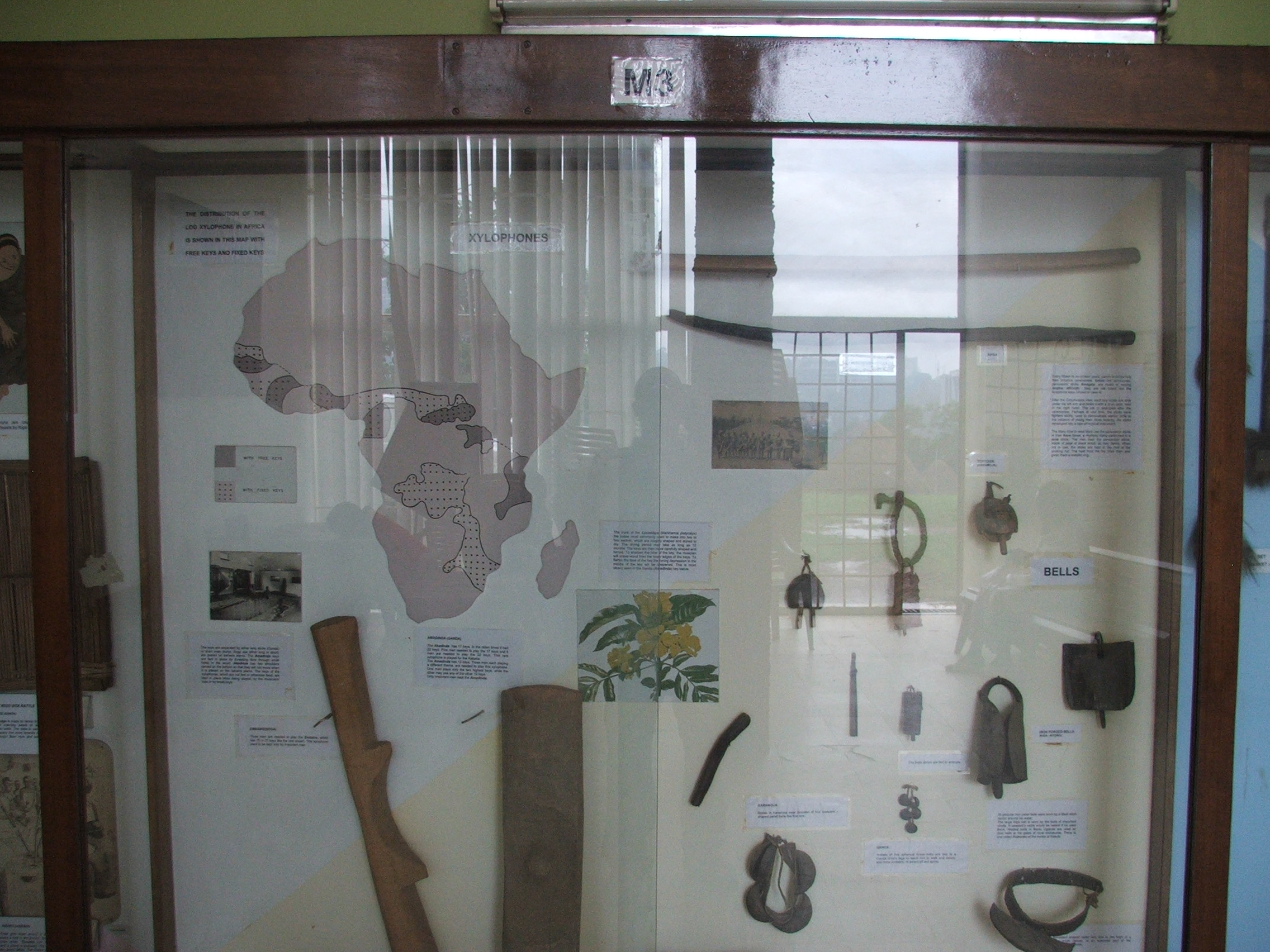
Percussion musical instruments

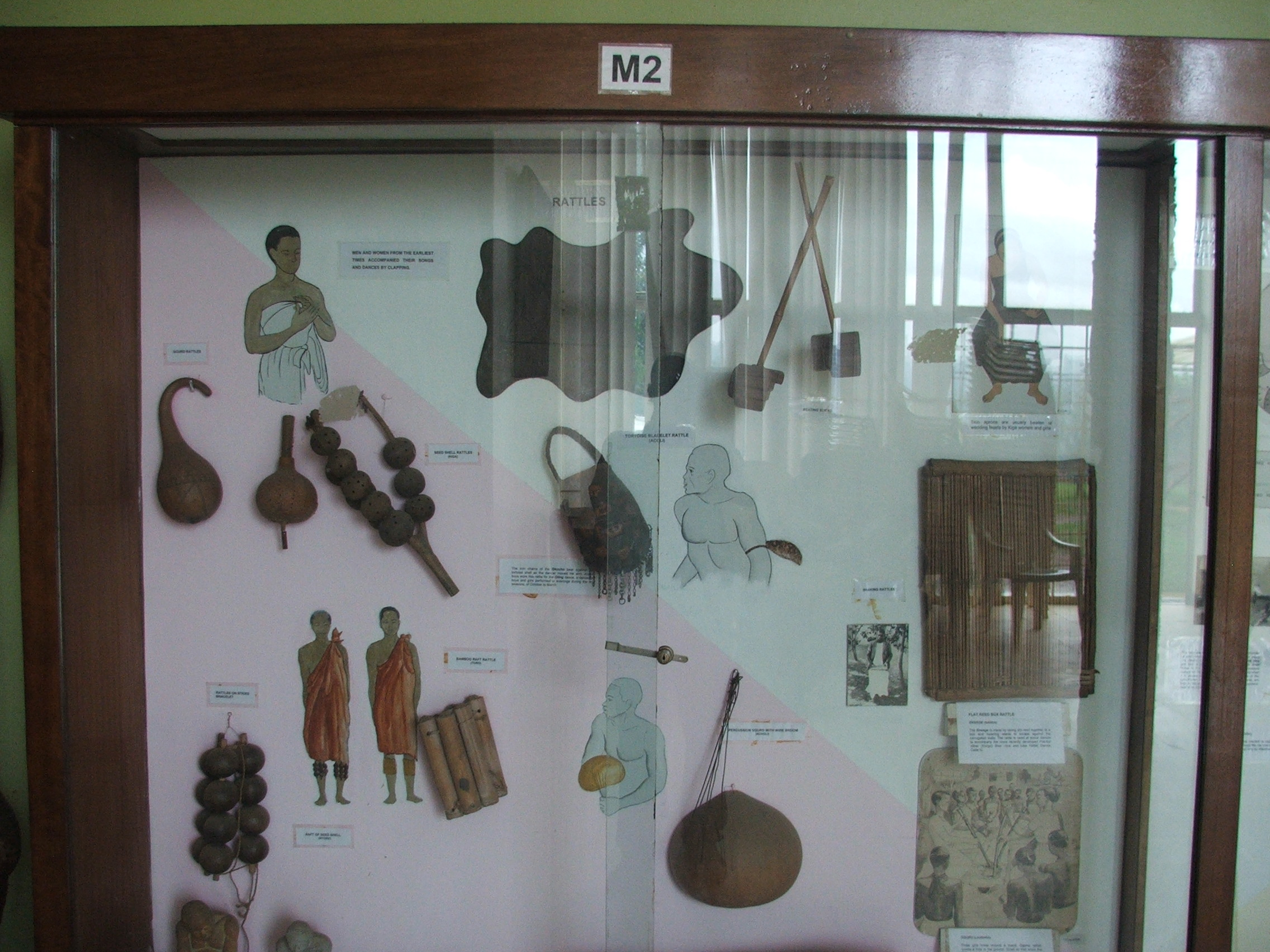
Percussion musical instruments

== Paleontology ==
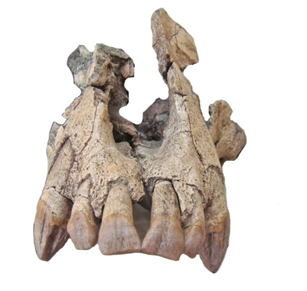
Fossil hominidae age between 19–20 million years ago from Napak-Uganda

The Uganda Museum carries out research across the country, with intensive research in the Karamoja region (Napak, Moroto and Kadam), Eastern Uganda at the foothills of Mount Elgon (Bukwo) and the whole of the western rift to Dellu, near Uganda's border with South Sudan. The Paleontological Research Unit has yielded fossils that relate to human evolution. For instance, Uganda Pithecus (fossil skull of a remote cousin of Hominidae) is a fossil ape, aged between 19 and 20 million years, that was discovered in Napak. Paleoenvironmental research around heritage sites has also taken place in eastern and western Uganda.

The Uganda Museum collaborates with Mbarara University, Makerere University, College de Franca, Natural History Museum in Paris and the University of Michigan.

=== Collections ===
A wide range of collections exist from the 1960s to the present. Specimens are displayed in the Natural History/Palaeontology Gallery which is open to the public. Collections in storage are available to researchers and students on request.

=== Repatriated artefacts ===
The museum also received 39 cultural artefacts from the University of Cambridge in 2024 under a loan arrangement for research and exhibition.

=== Publications ===
Publications of findings can be found in various journals, including the Geo-Pal, an online Uganda scientific journal.

== Education service ==
Apart from the permanent exhibits in the galleries, the Uganda Museum offers educational service in form of demonstration lessons, outreach programs, workshops and complimentary services. Using the available specimens, the museum arranges a variety of topical lessons related to the school curriculum. Student tours are conducted around the museum, as well as giving introductory lectures with slides, films, and other aids. The museum staff from the education section go into the more remote areas of the country to teach in villages whose schools are not able to visit the museums. Some objects are loaned out to schools to be used as visual aids. The museum hosts lectures, public talks and workshops on relevant topics to the public in the auditorium. The museum is well equipped with facilities, such as canteen and internet cafe, which offer a variety of traditional foods of Uganda, and gift shops that showcase Uganda's crafts.

== Cultural village ==
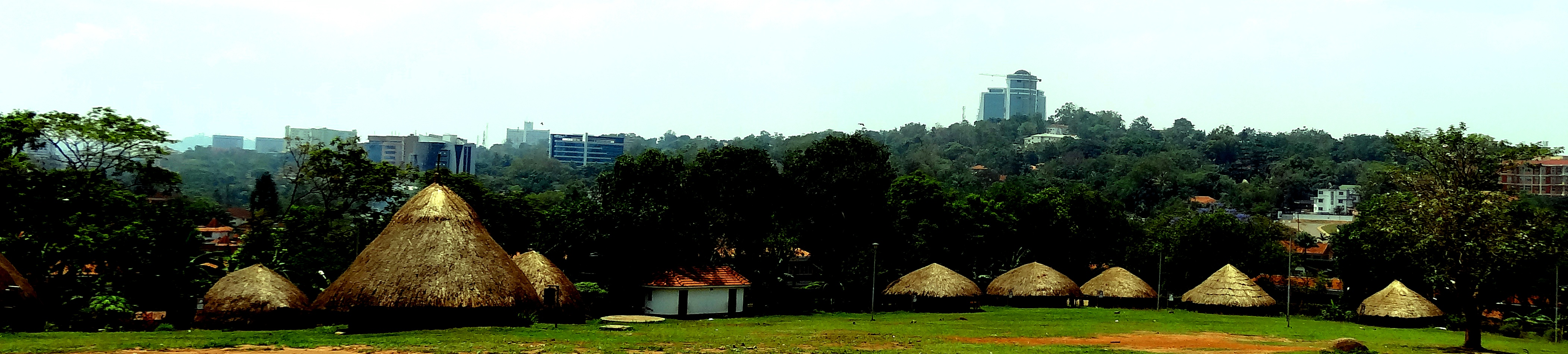
The Cultural Village at the Uganda Museum, depicting the different architectural and traditional lifestyles in Uganda

At the back of the Uganda Museum building is the cultural village with huts depicting traditional lifestyles of people in Uganda. For visitors who want to experience the indigenous ways of the Ugandan people, an array of cultural material, such as milk pots made from wood (ebyanzi), gourd vessels, basketry, bead work, horn work, ceramics, cutlery, leather works, armoury, and musical instruments, are displayed. These houses include Bamba House, Batooro House, Bunyoro House, Hima House, Ankole House and Kigezi House, all representing the western region. Some of the more interesting items in the Tooro House, are the beddings, especially the makeshift wooden bed, the backcloth blanket, and the royal drums. In the Ankole House that belongs to Banyankole, there are cooking utensils like pots, bowls made of clay and a mingling stone showing how the Banyankole used to prepare millet bread (kalo) before the invention of milling machines. In the Hima House that belongs to the Bahima, there are milk gourds used for keeping milk and long horns representing the type of cattle that used to dominate the Hima kraals. There is also a lotion made from milk that was used to smear a would-be bride.

From eastern Uganda there is Busoga House, Jopadhola House, Bugisu House, Teso House and Karamojong House. The Bugisu House is dotted with circumcision tools, including knives and headgear, among other regalia. In the Teso House there are several calabashes used for brewing and drinking malwa, a popular local brew in eastern Uganda. There are also mingling stones and pots for preparing kalo, which is one of their main foods. Other houses include Acholi House, Lango House, Alur House and Madi House all from northern Uganda. Some of these houses contain arrows and bows which were mainly used for protection tools and for hunting. The Baganda House represents people from the central region. Inside the house there is backcloth, drums, baskets for Luwombo, hunting nets, wooden sandals (emikalabanda), and the Omweso game popular among the Baganda.

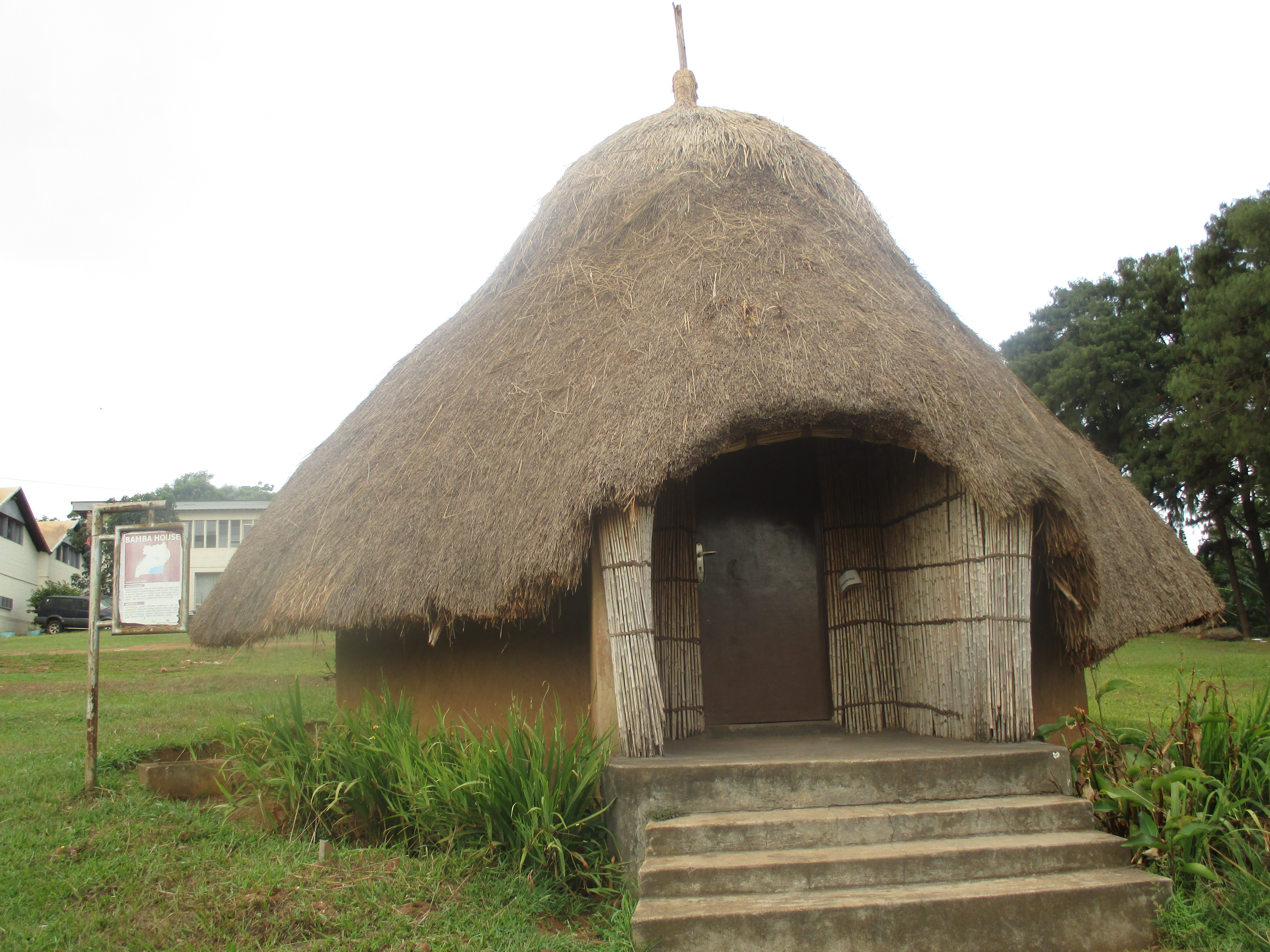
Bamba House

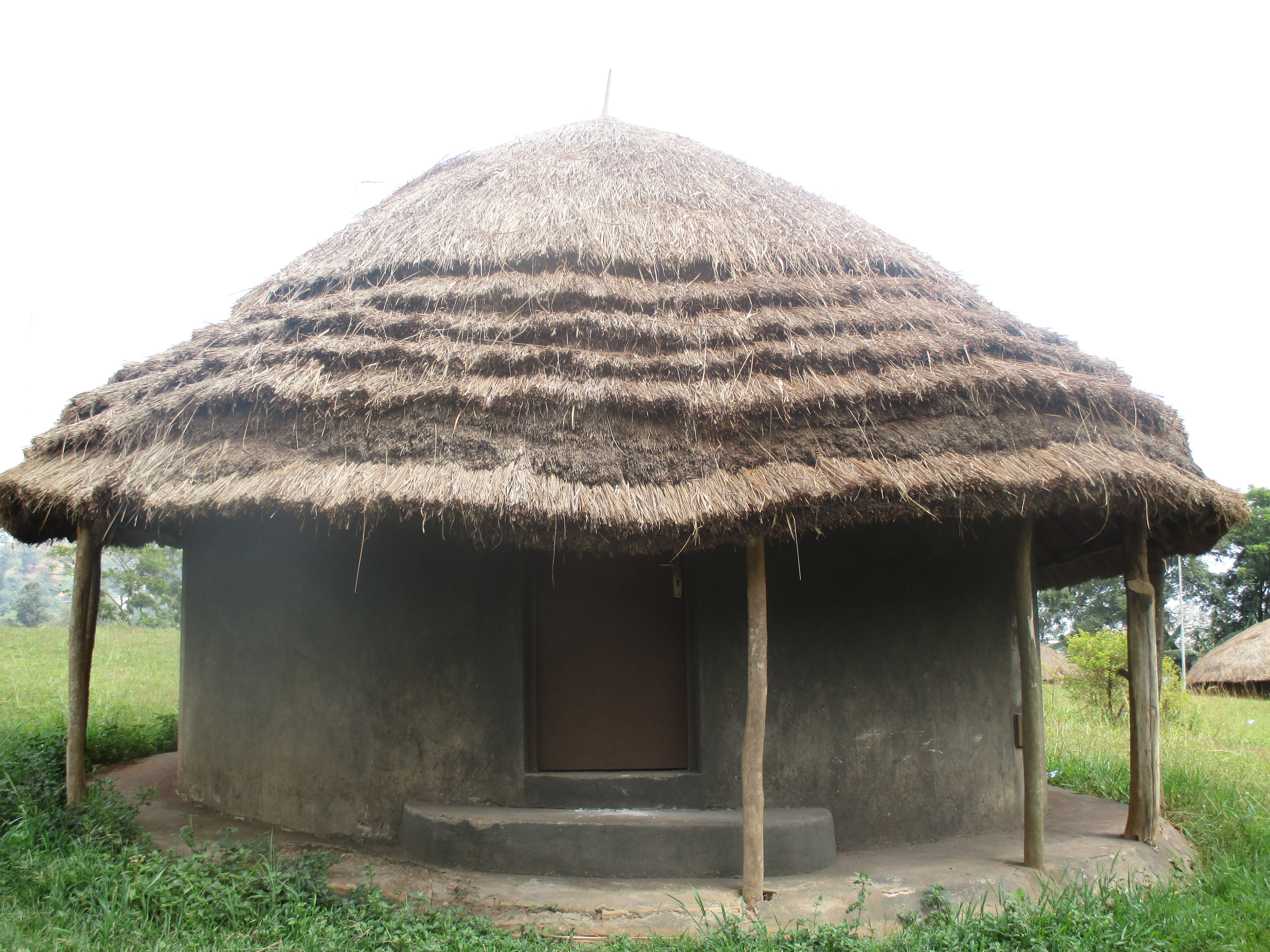
Lango House

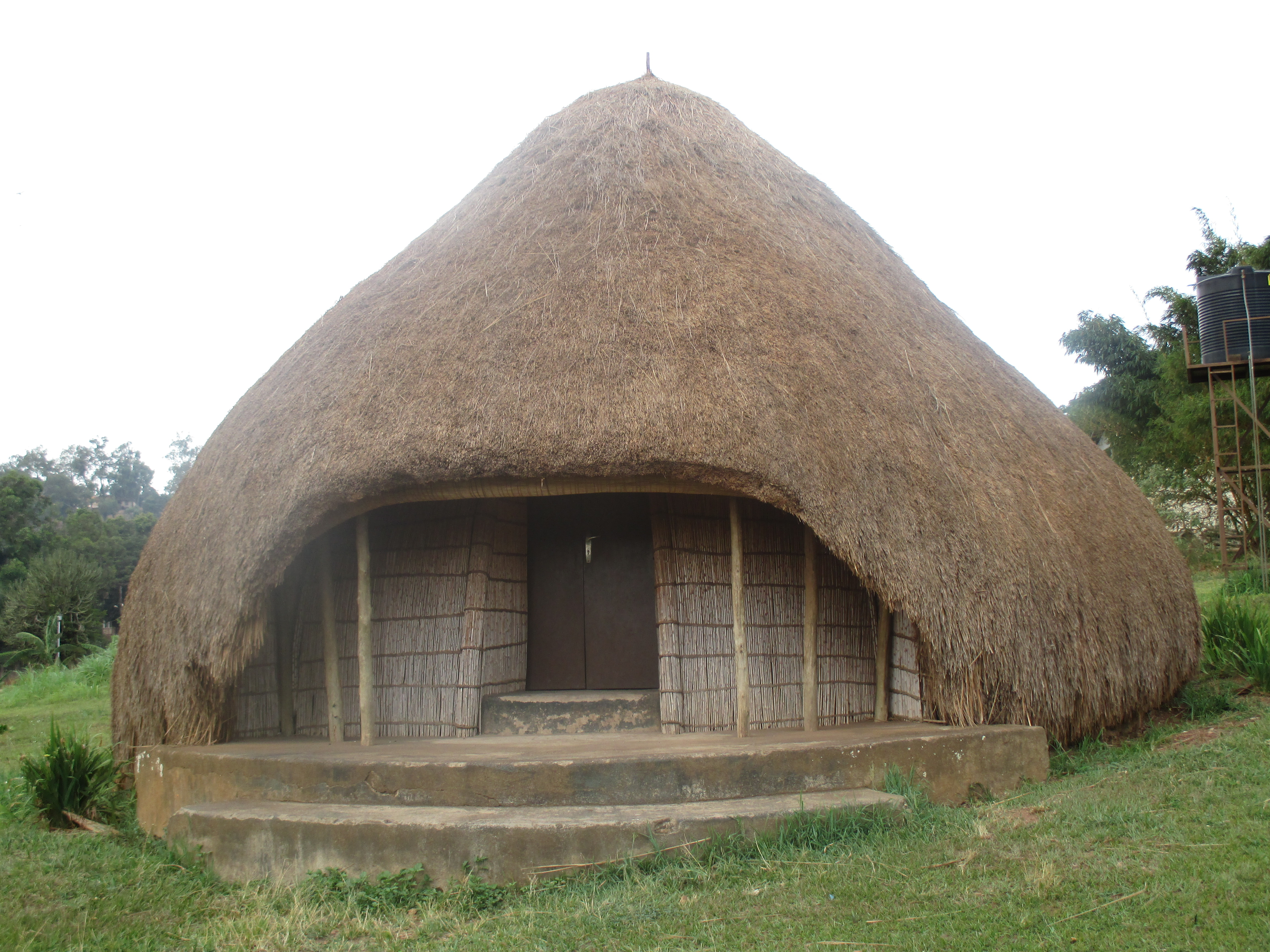
Acholi House

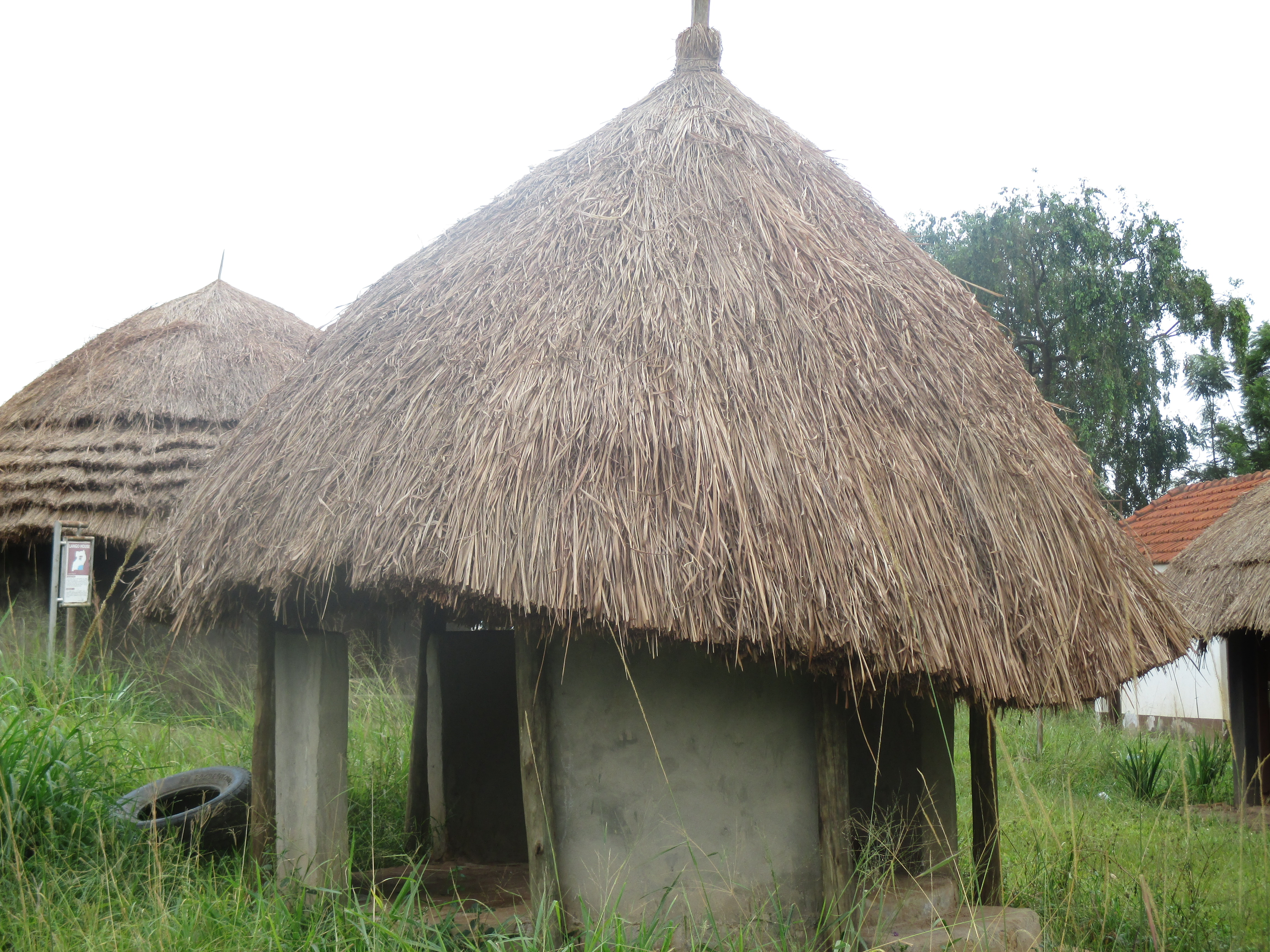
Acholi Old man House

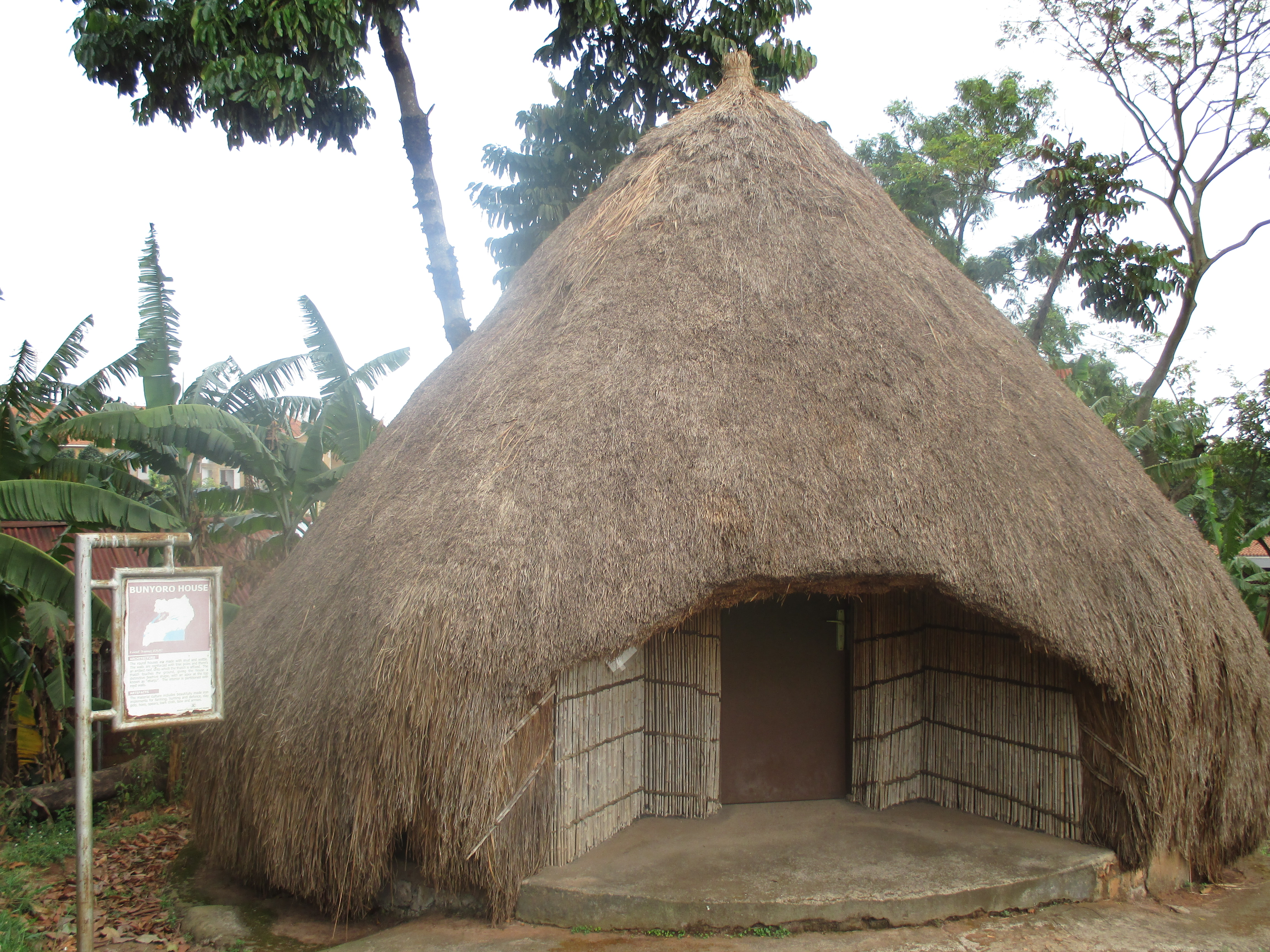
Bunyoro House

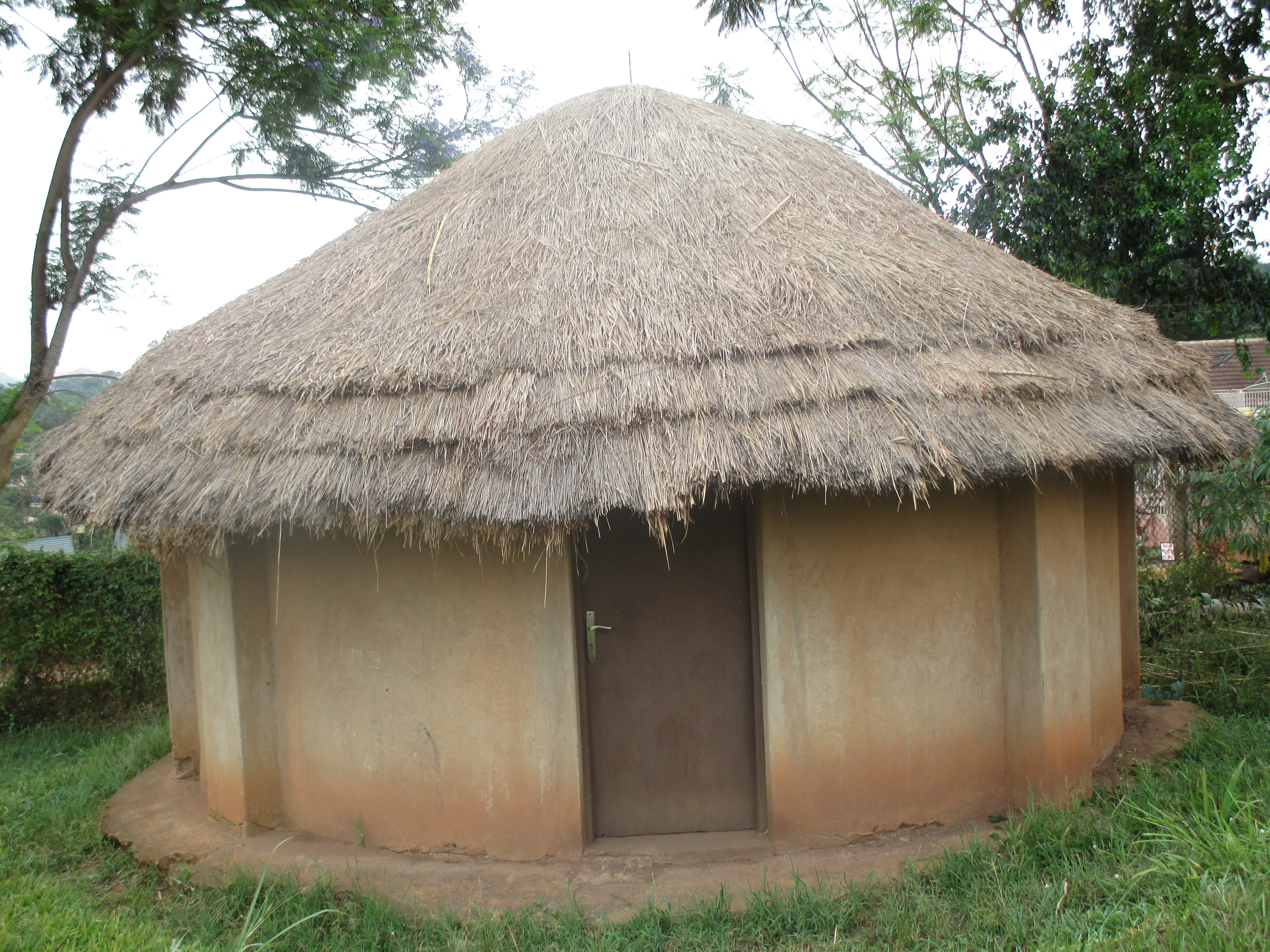
Madi House

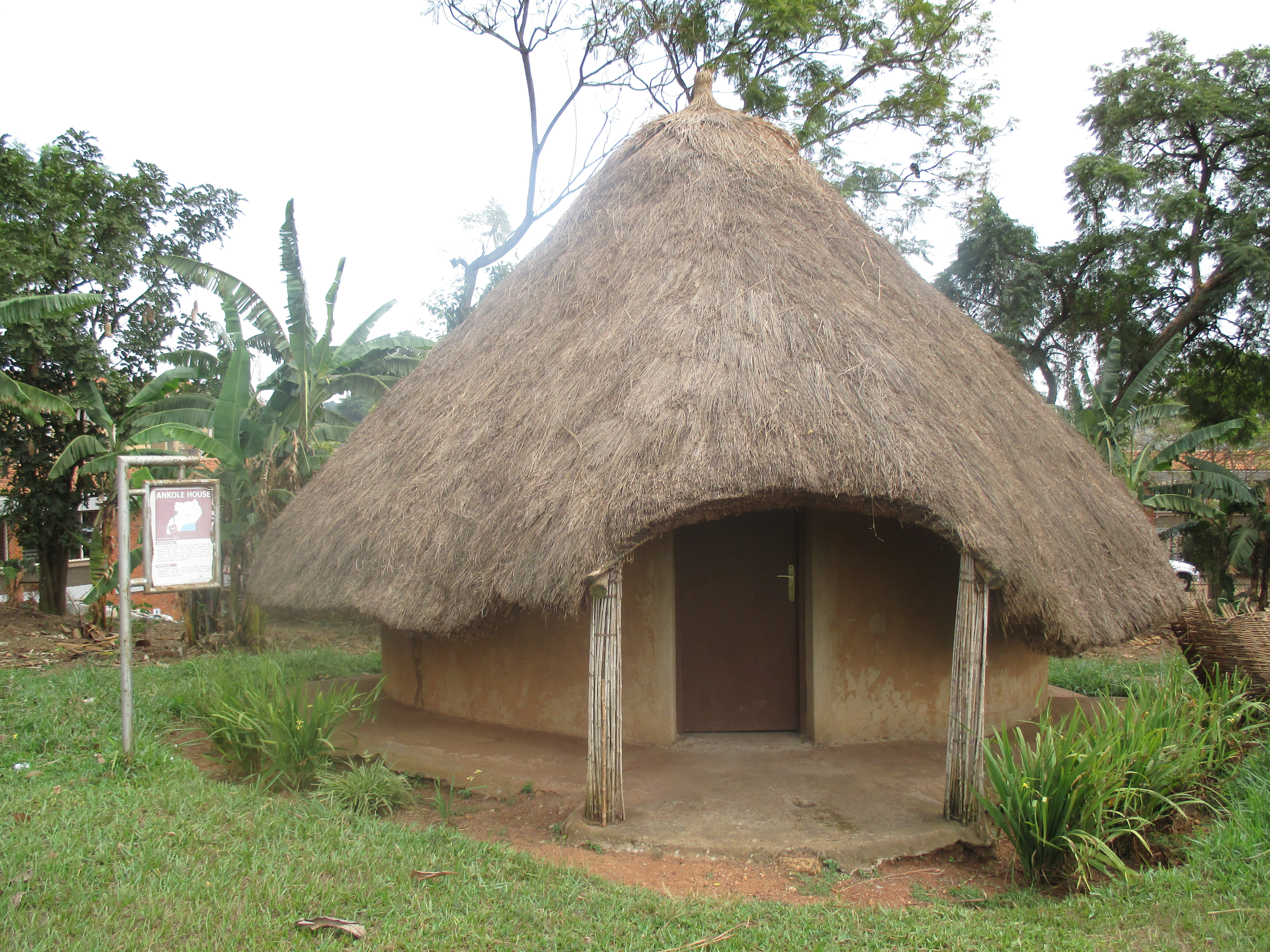
Ankole House

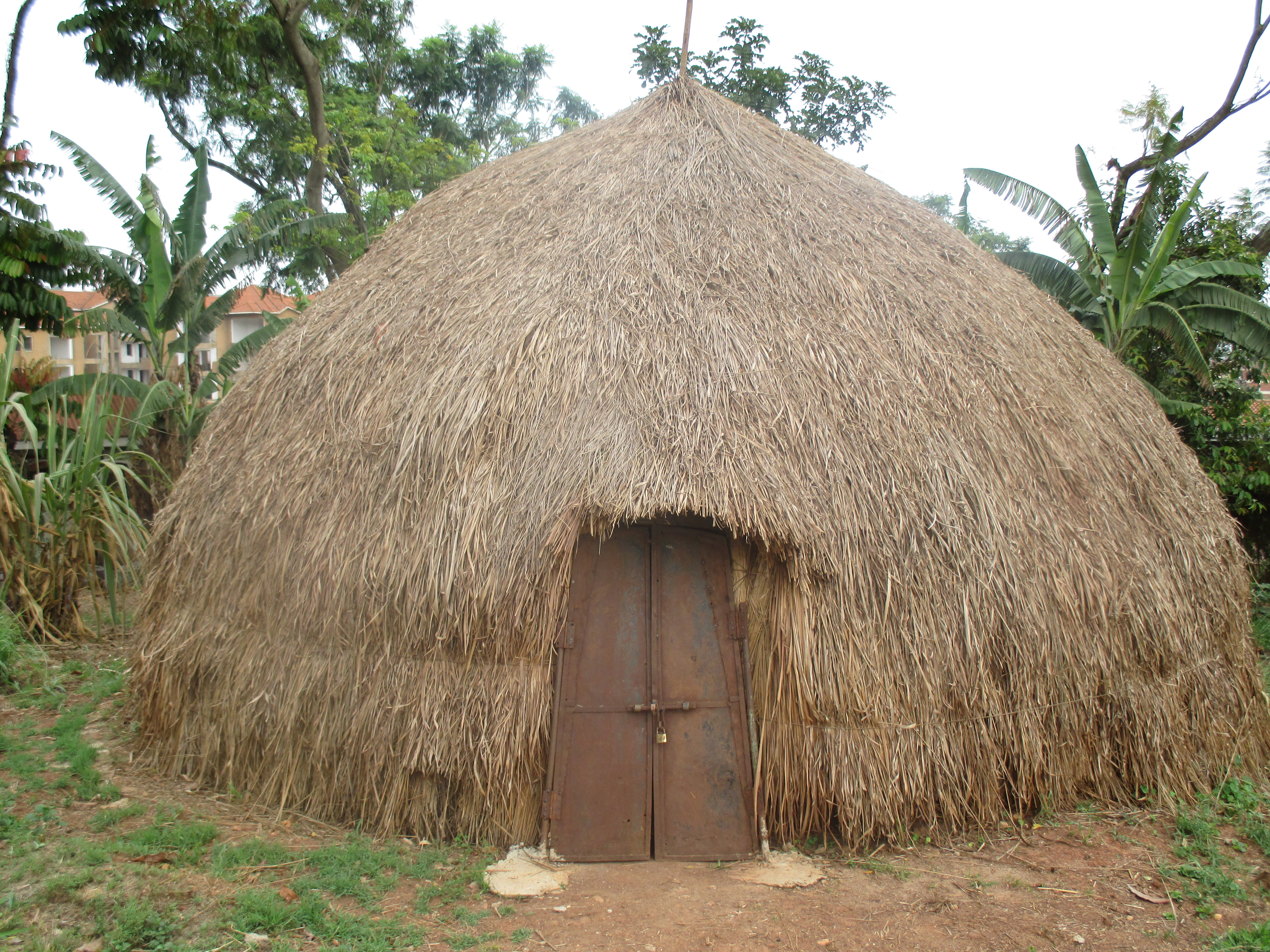
Hima House

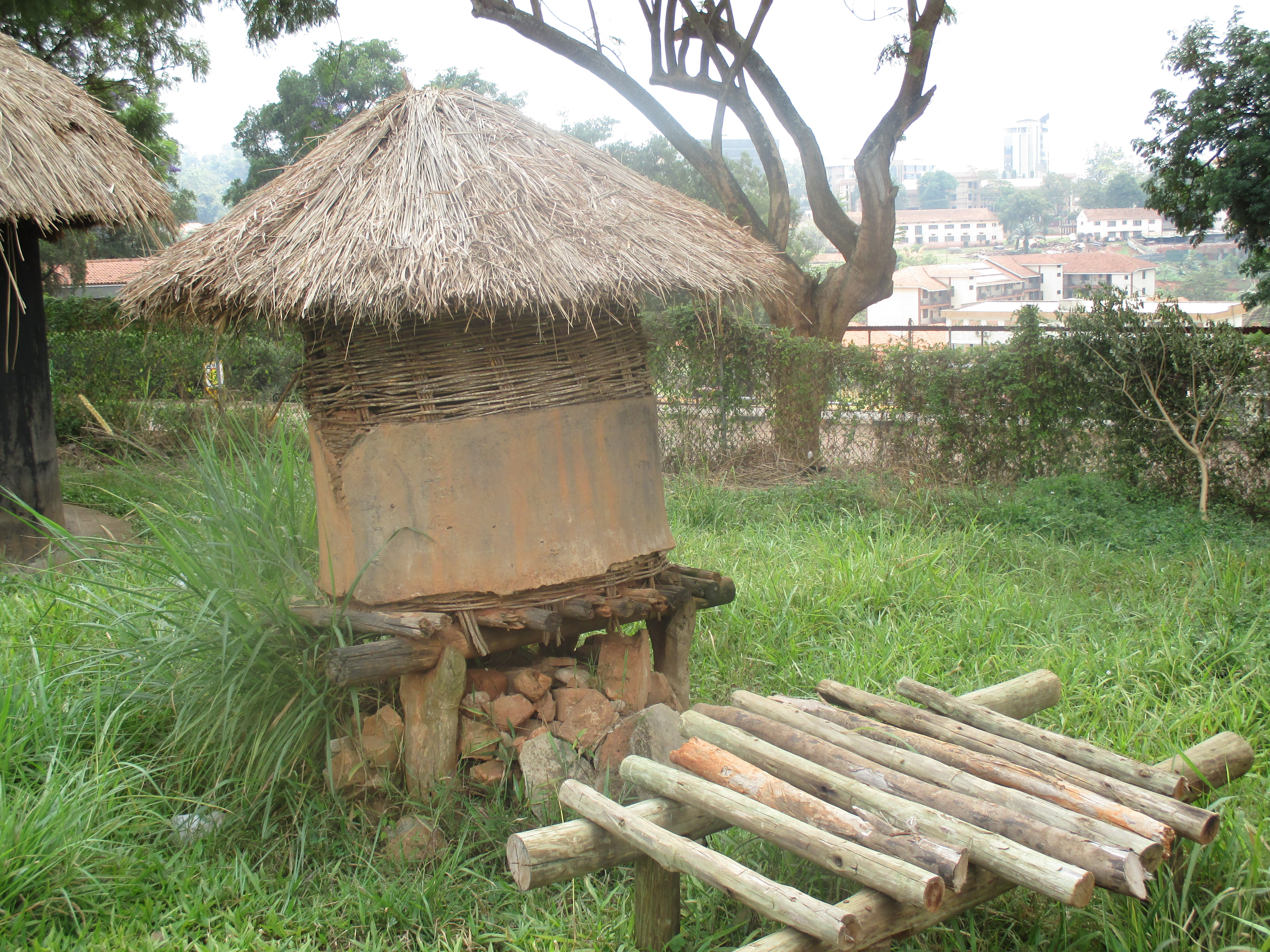
Alur House Granary

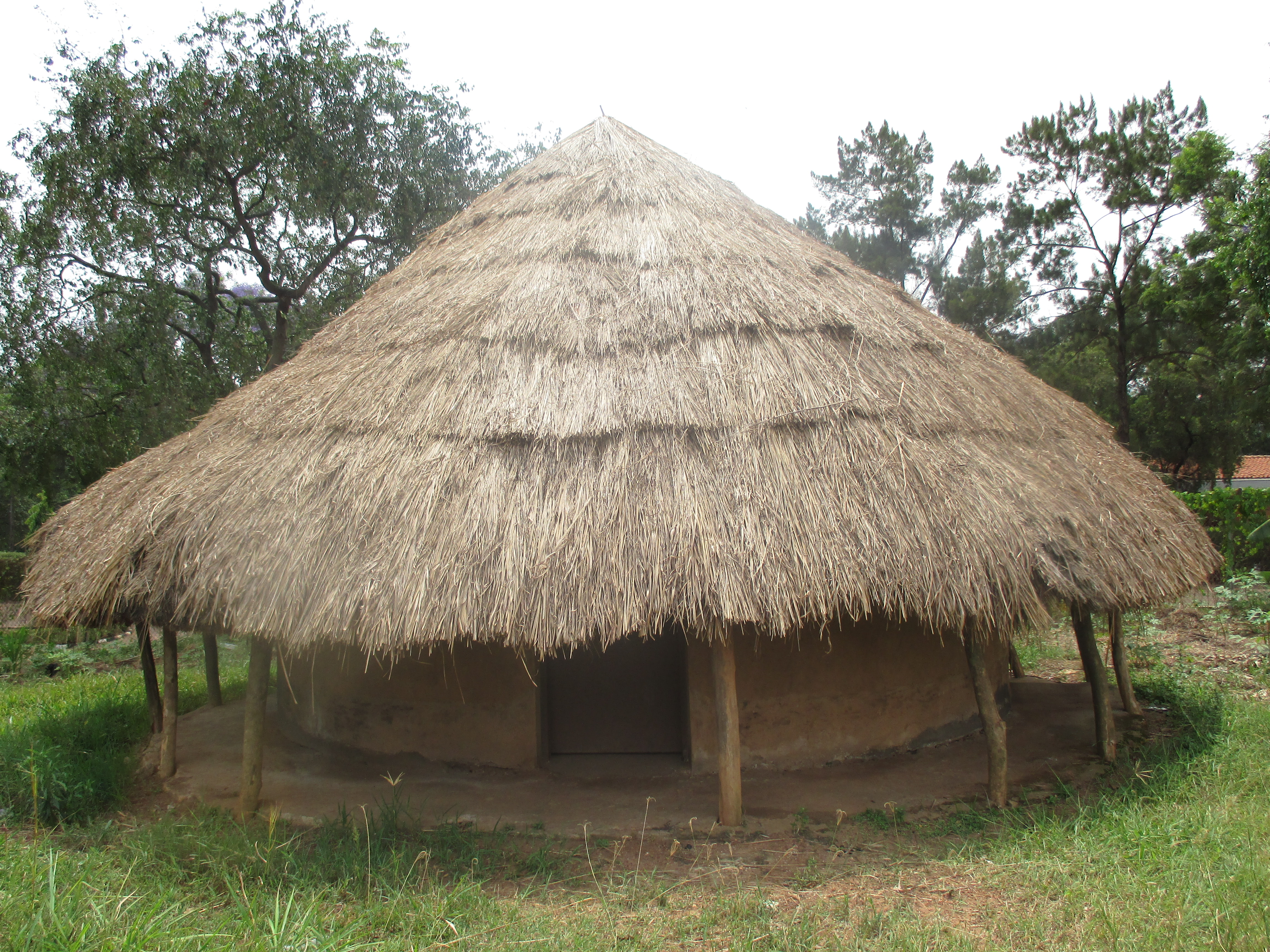
Teso House

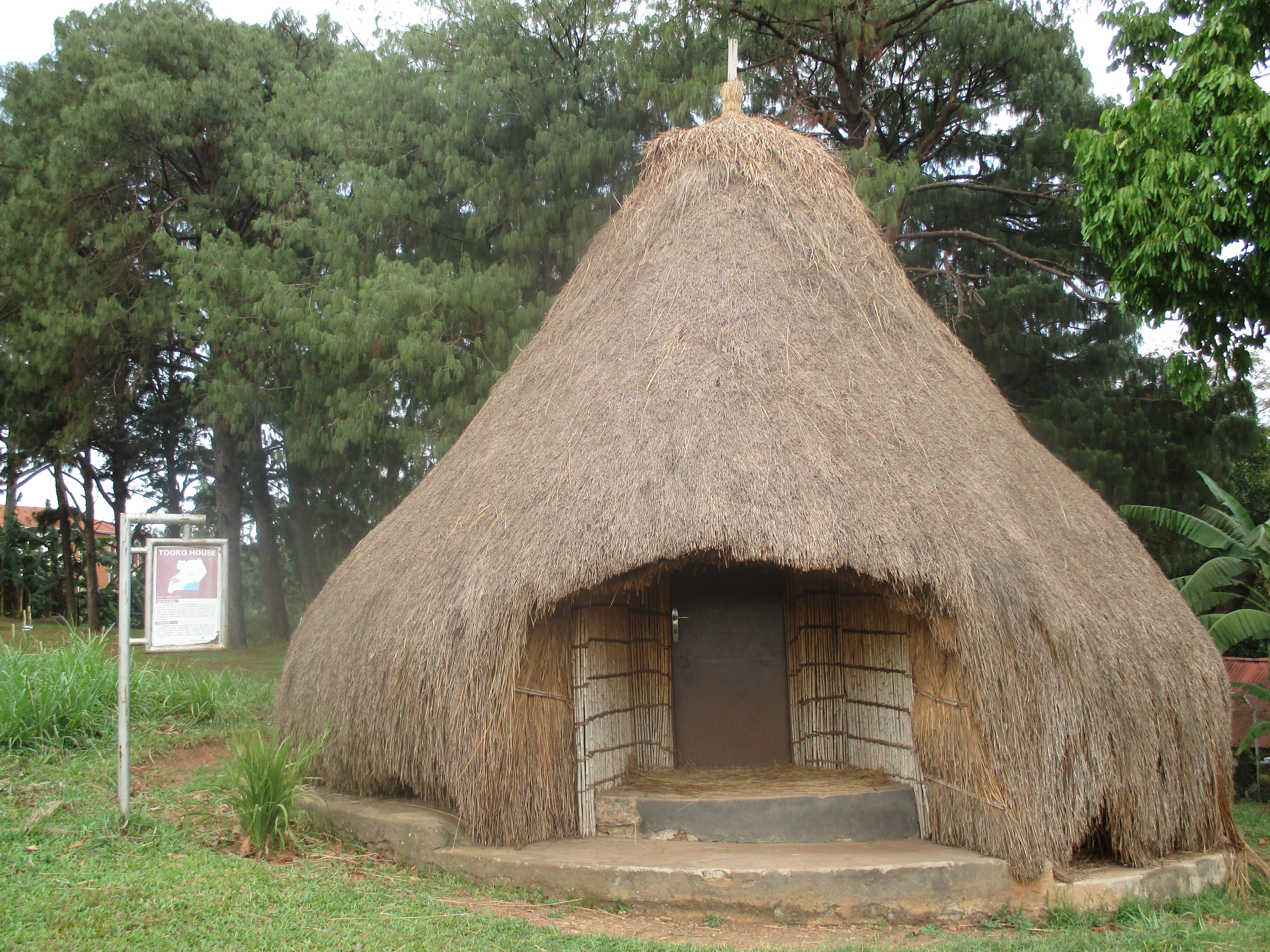
Tooro House

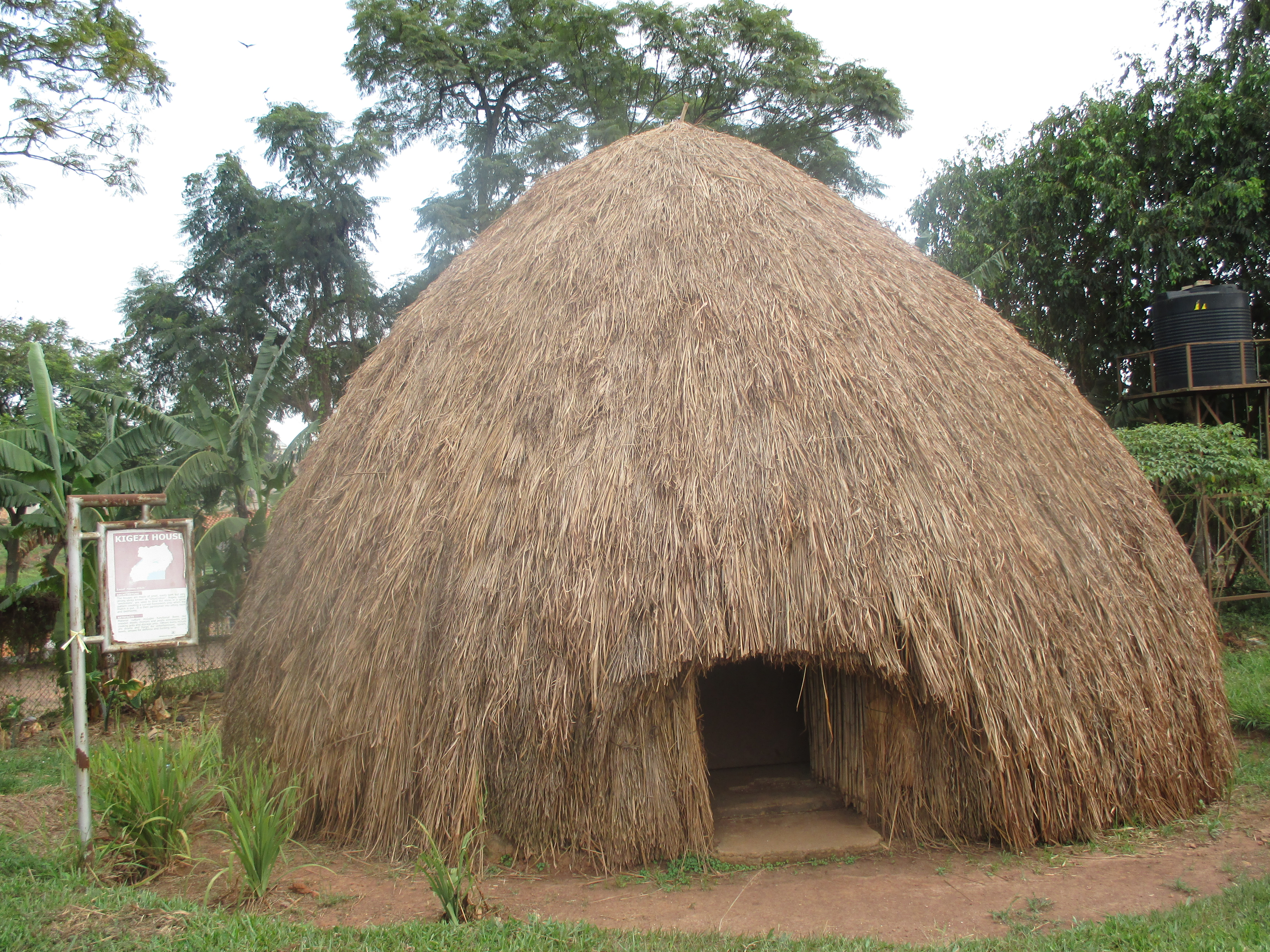
Kigezi House

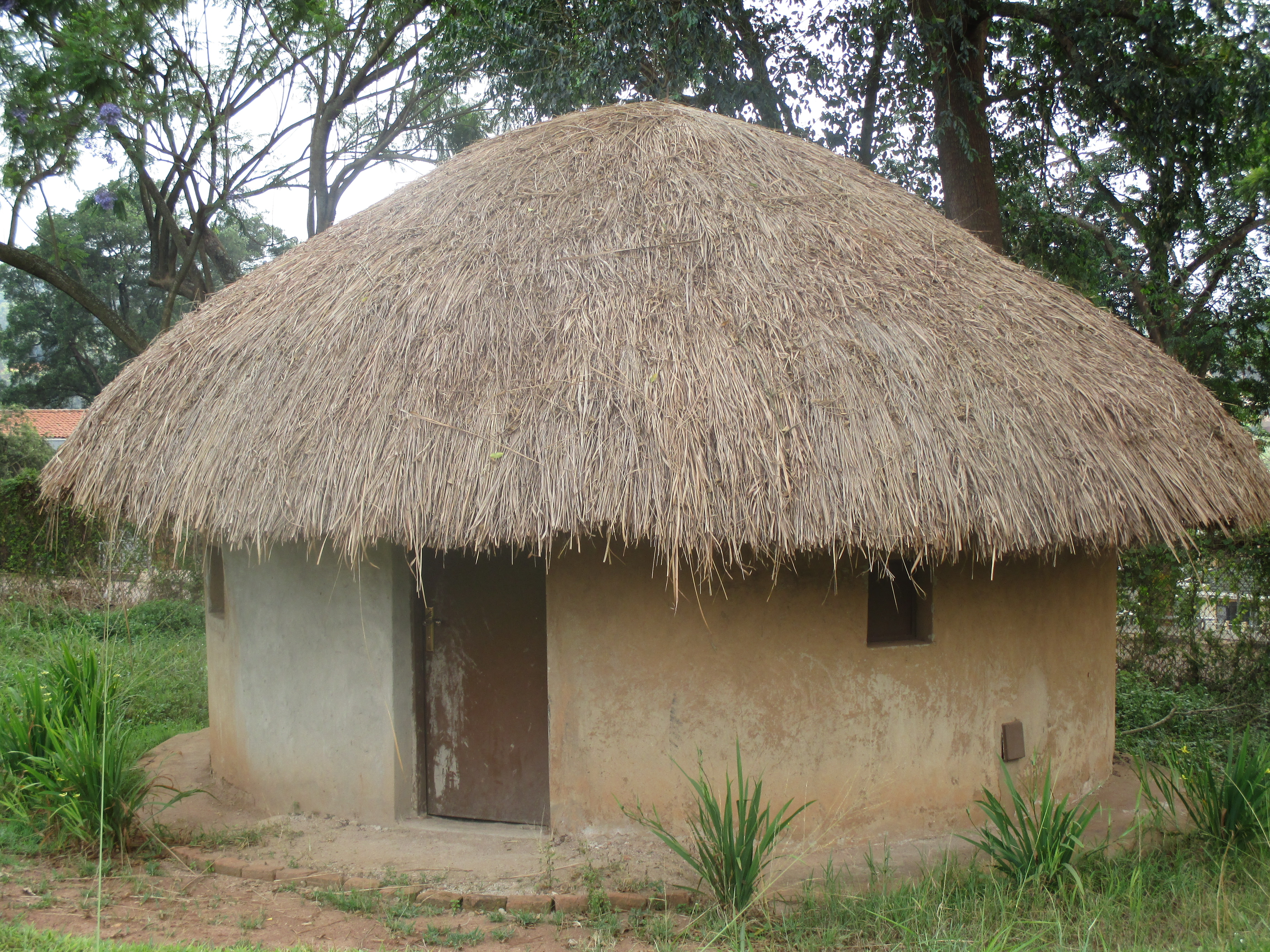
Alur house

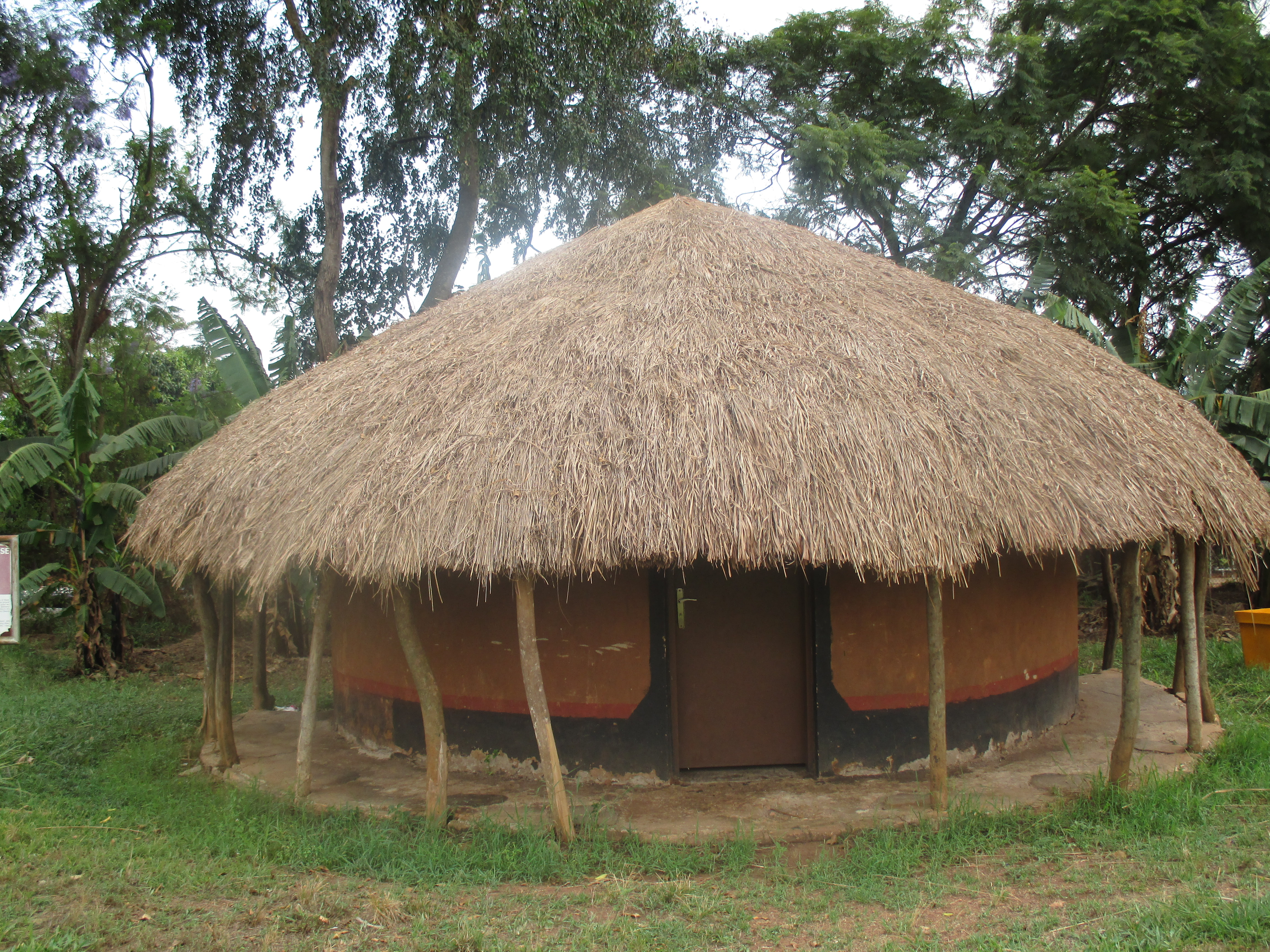
Busoga house

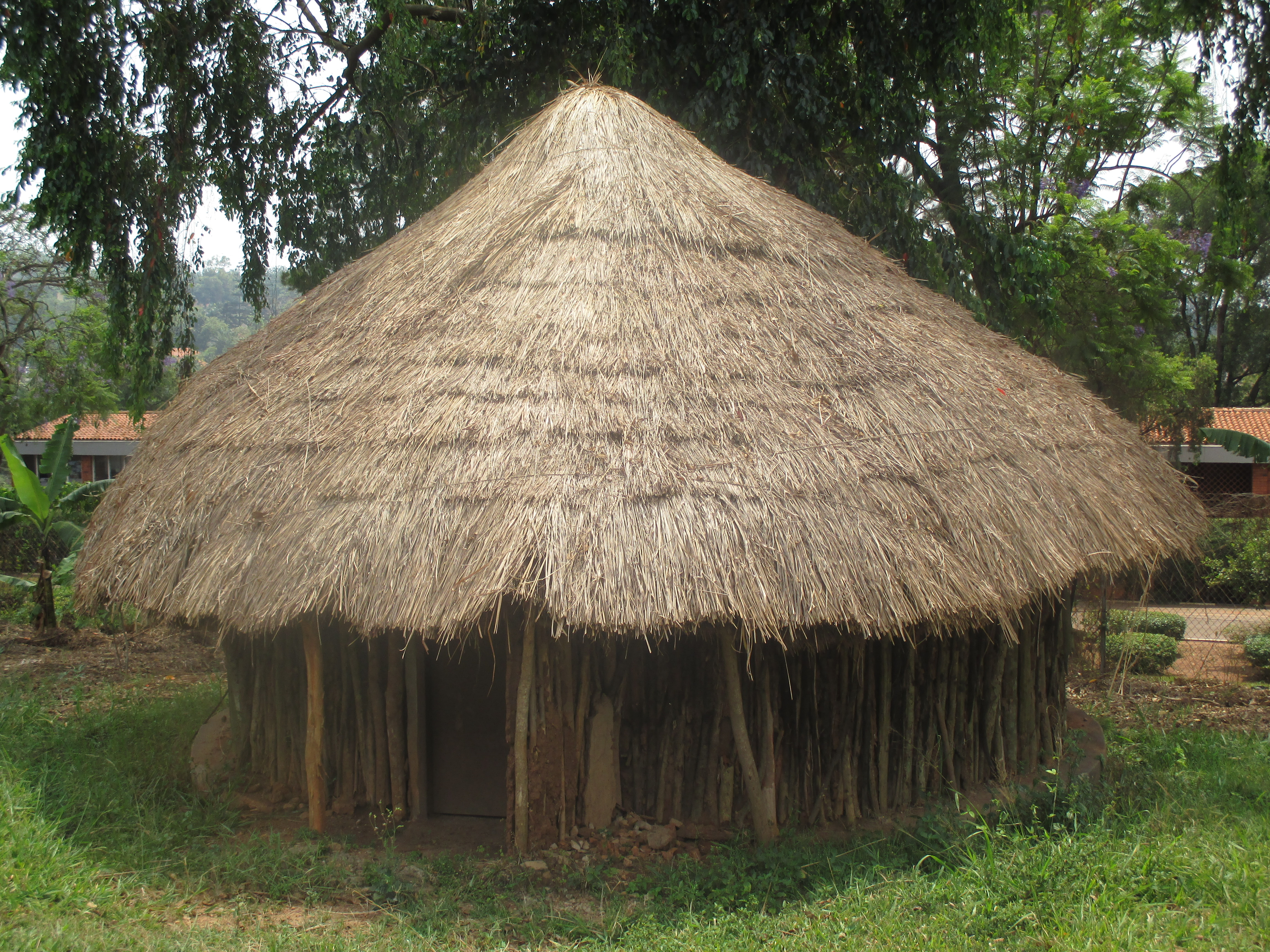
Karamoja house

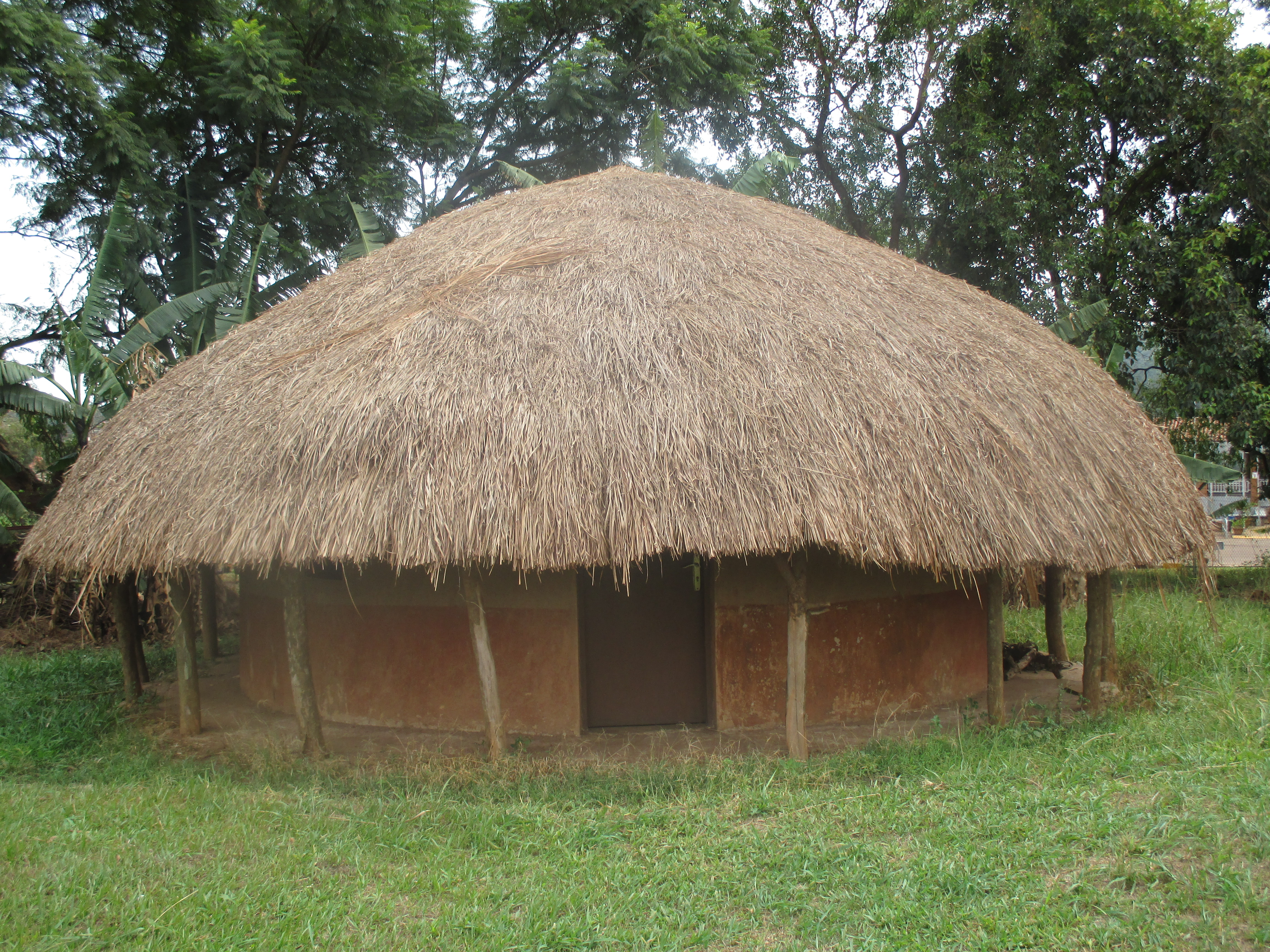
Japadhola house

== Children's Resource Center ==
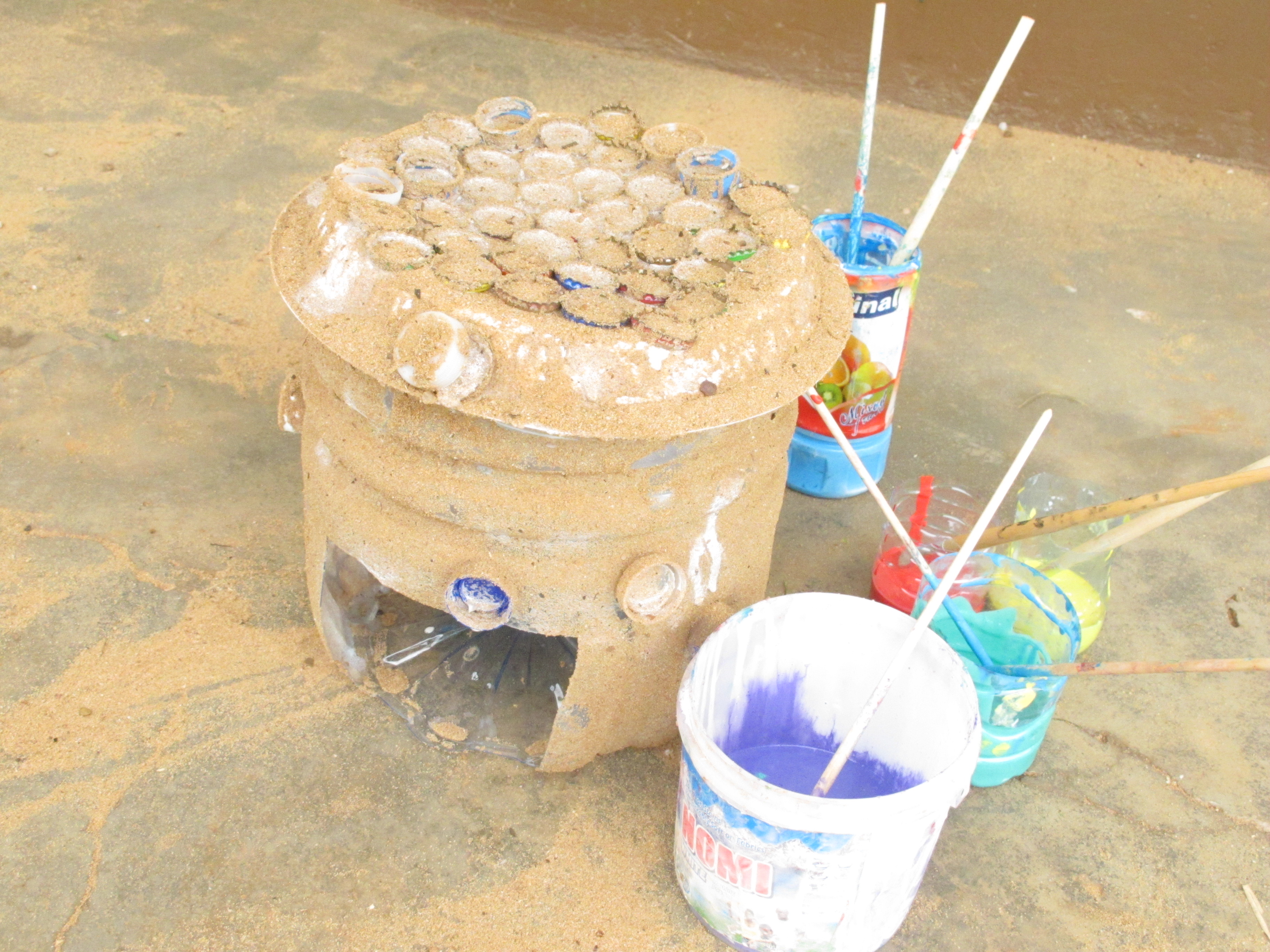

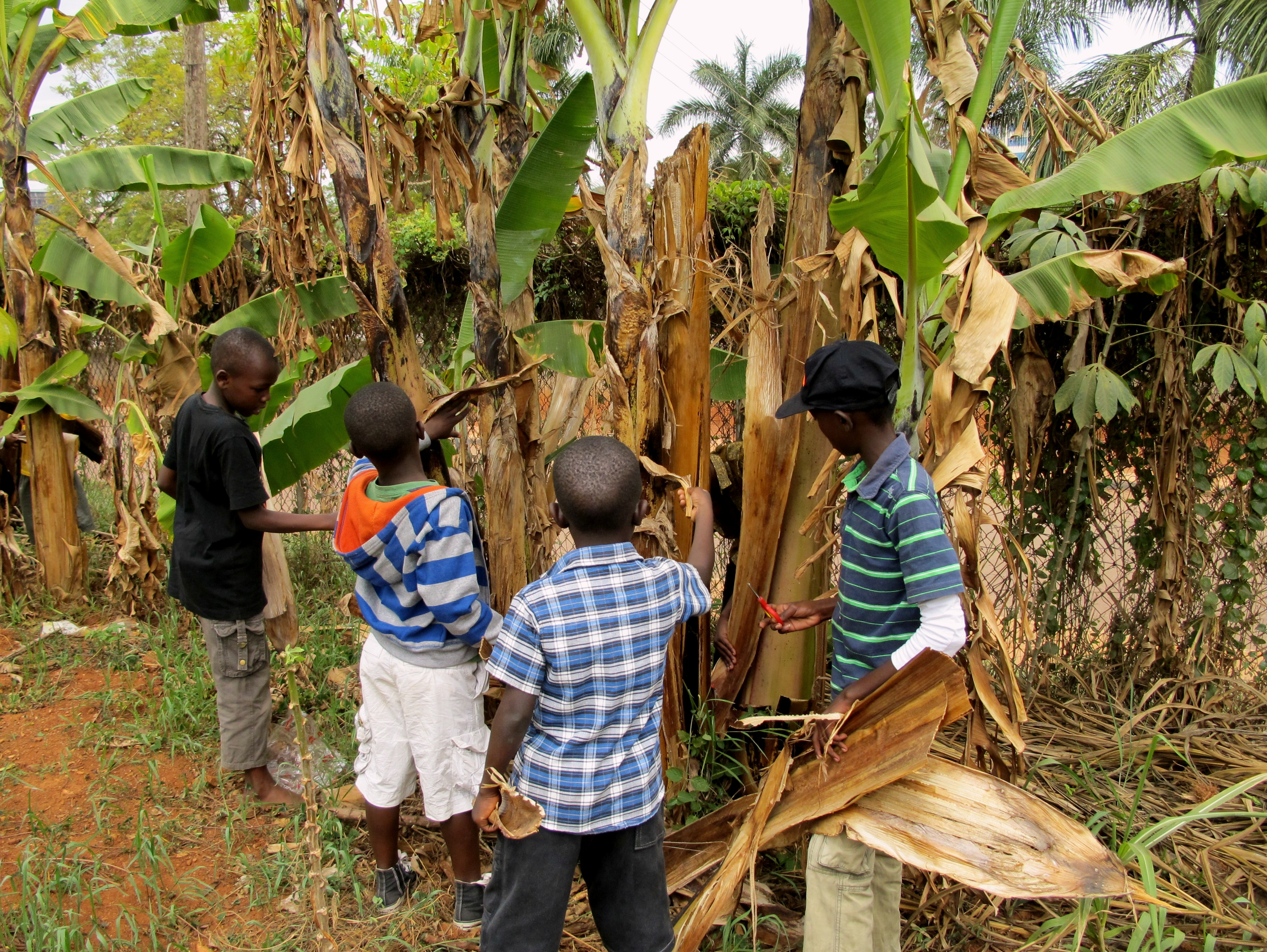

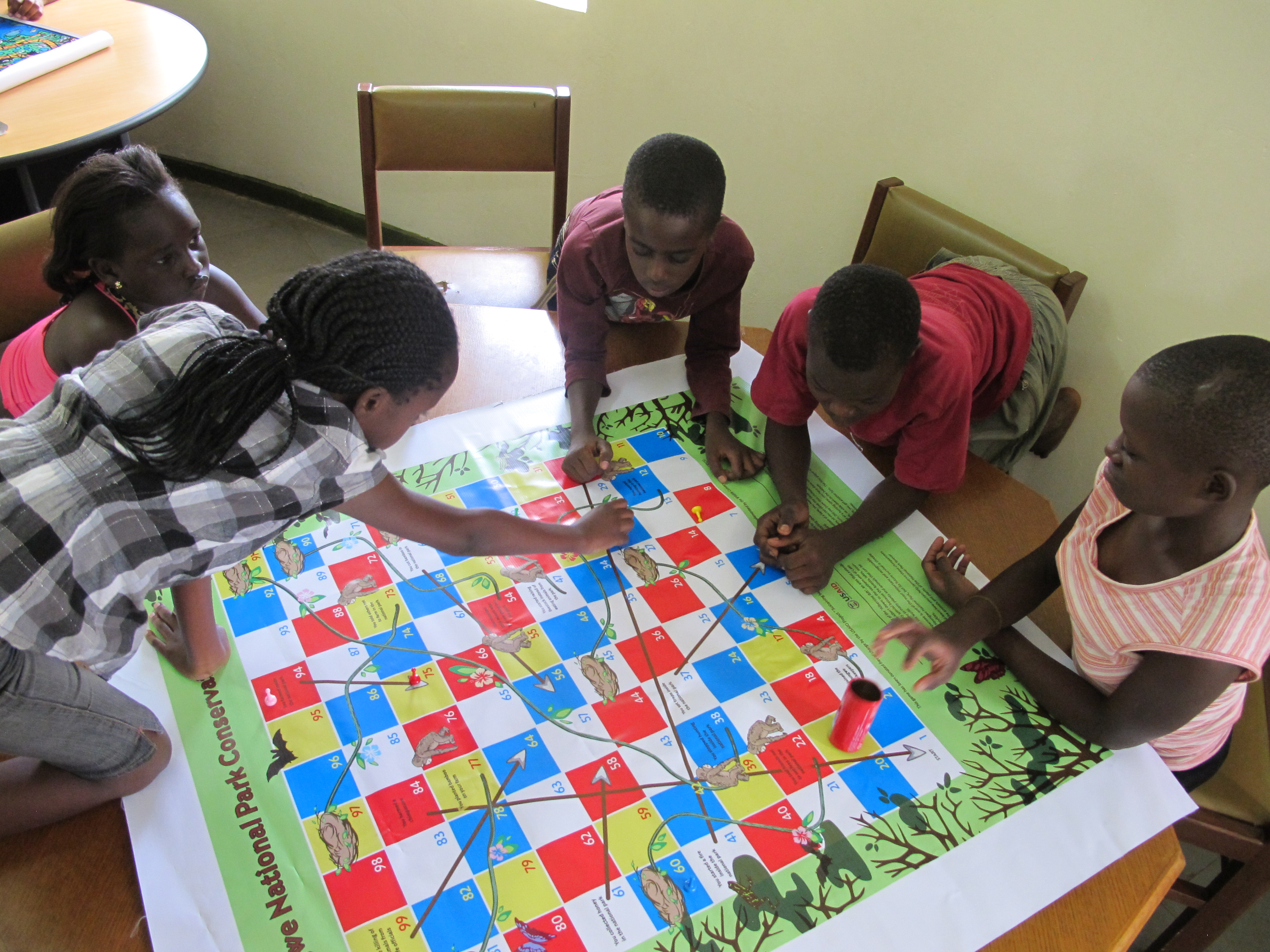

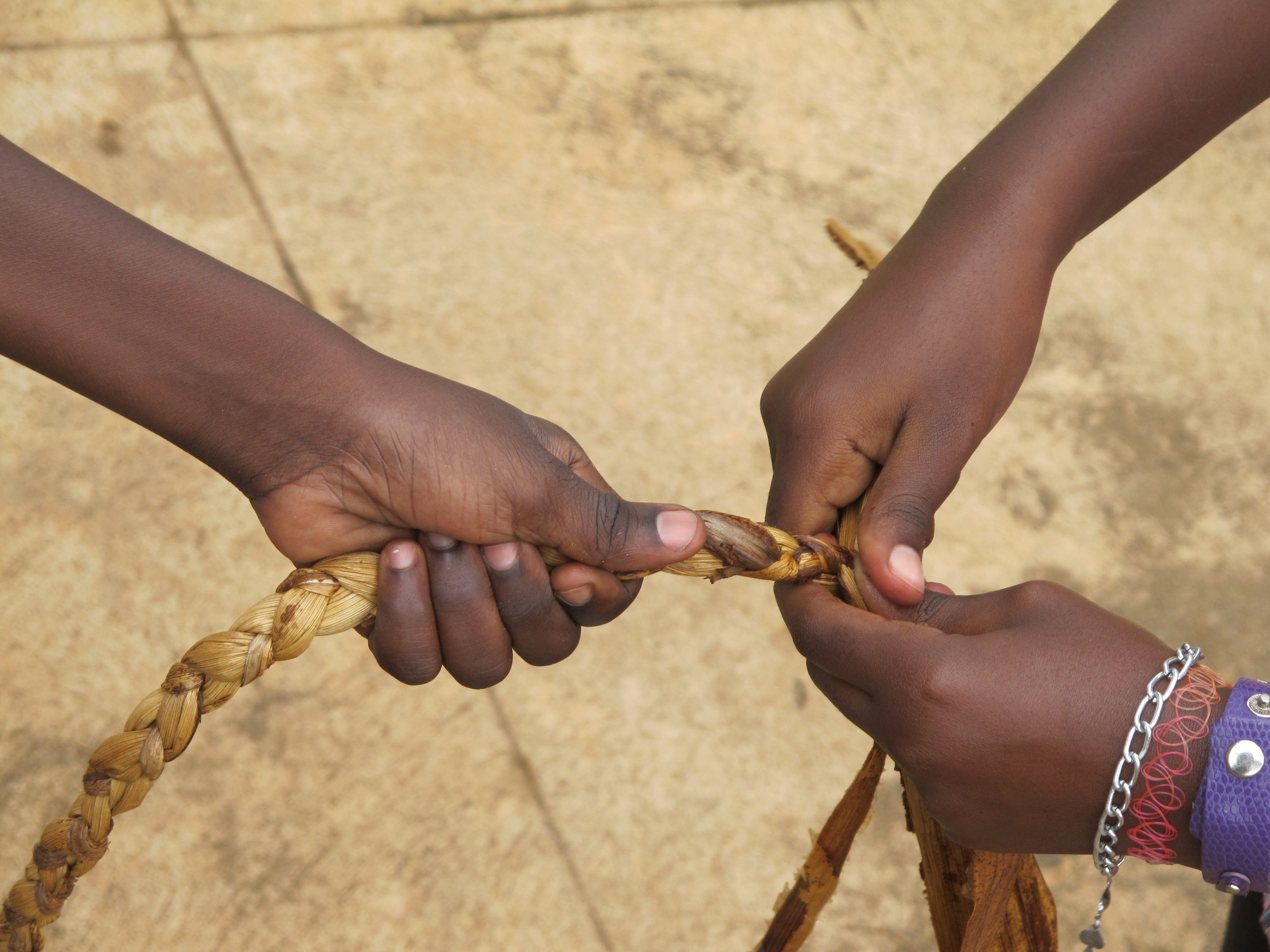

== Architecture ==
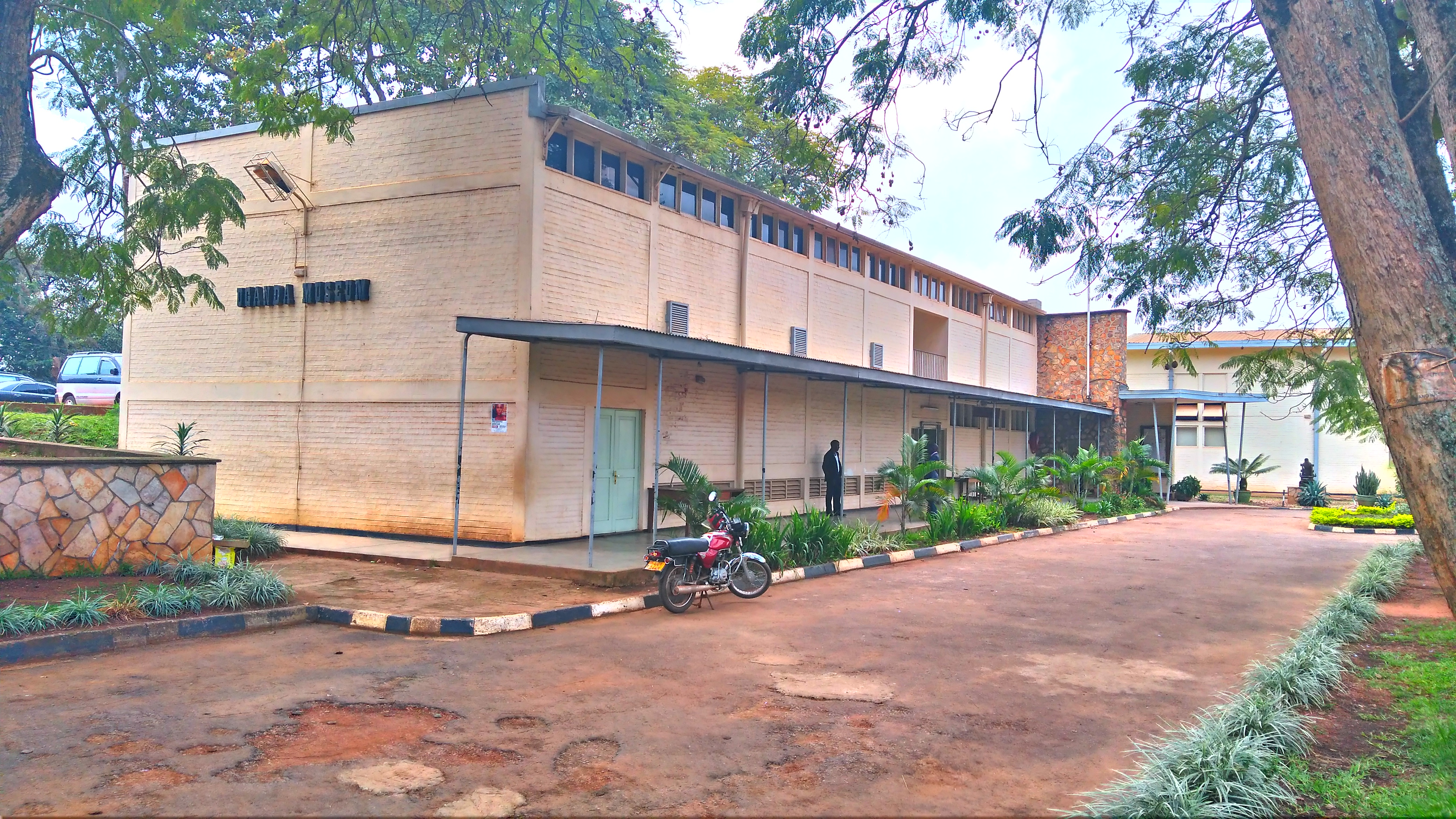
Side view of Uganda National Museum main building

The museum building is a historical landmark designed by German architect Ernst May. The building was designed with ample natural lighting and air to ensure proper preservation of objects.

== Threats to the museum ==
During 2011, the Uganda Museum complex (that includes the headquarters of Uganda Wildlife Authority) was under threat of demolition. The Uganda Government was planning to build an East African Trade Centre(sometimes referred to as the Kampala Tower) on the site. In 2011, four civil society organisations, the Historic Resources Conservation Initiatives (HRCI), Cross Cultural Foundation of Uganda (CCFU), Historical Buildings Conservation Trust (HBCT) and Jenga Afrika, took the government of the Republic of Uganda to court to halt the government's plans.
