= List of Ugandan artists =

The following list of Ugandan artists (in alphabetical order by last name) includes artists of various genres, who are notable and are either born in Uganda, of Ugandan descent or who produce works that are primarily about Uganda.

== A ==
- Said Adrus (born 1958), Ugandan-born British multimedia artist, mixed media artist
- Catherine Apalat (born 1981), photographer, journalist, blogger, filmmaker

== B ==
- Leilah Babirye (born 1985), painter, draftsperson, sculptor, ceramicist
- Zarina Bhimji (born 1963), Ugandan Indian photographer, based in London

== K ==
- Kizito Maria Kasule (born 1967), painter, educator
- Acaye Kerunen (born 1981), fiber artist, performance artist, actress, poet, writer
- Rose Kirumira (born 1962), sculptor, educator
- George William Kyeyune (born 1962), sculptor, professor

== M ==
- Betty Manyolo (born 1938), painter and printmaker
- Henry Mzili Mujunga (born 1971), painter, printmaker, and writer
- Theresa Musoke (born 1945), Ugandan-born Kenyan painter, muralist

== N ==
- Lillian Mary Nabulime (born 1963), sculptor, educator
- Varsha Nair (born 1957), Ugandan Indian painter
- Nuwa Wamala Nnyanzi (born 1952), multi-media visual artist

== O ==
- Bathsheba Okwenje (born 1973), photographer and installation artist

== S ==
- Ignatius Sserulyo (born 1937), painter
- Sandra Suubi (born 1990), gospel musician, eco-artist

== T ==
- Esteri Tebandeke (born 1984), filmmaker, actress, dancer and visual artist
- Elly Tumwine (1954–2022), military officer, designer, visual artist, and educator

== W ==
- Sarah Waiswa, documentary and portrait photographer; lives in Kenya

== See also ==
- African art
- List of Ugandan Americans
- List of Ugandan women artists
