= List of Ugandan women artists =

This is a list of women artists who were born in Ugandan, of Ugandan descent, or whose artworks are closely associated with that country.

== A ==
- Catherine Apalat (born 1981), photographer, journalist, blogger, filmmaker

== B ==
- Leilah Babirye (born 1985), painter, draftsperson, sculptor, ceramicist
- Zarina Bhimji (born 1963), Ugandan Indian photographer, based in London

== K ==
- Acaye Kerunen (born 1981), fiber artist, performance artist, actress, poet, writer
- Rose Kirumira (born 1962), sculptor, educator

== M ==
- Betty Manyolo (born 1938), painter and printmaker
- Theresa Musoke (born 1945), Ugandan-born Kenyan painter, muralist

== N ==
- Lillian Mary Nabulime (born 1963), sculptor, educator

== O ==
- Bathsheba Okwenje (born 1973), photographer and installation artist

== S ==
- Sandra Suubi (born 1990), gospel musician, eco-artist

== T ==
- Esteri Tebandeke (born 1984), filmmaker, actress, dancer and visual artist

== W ==
- Sarah Waiswa, documentary and portrait photographer; lives in Kenya

== See also ==
- African art
- List of Ugandan artists
- List of Ugandan women writers
