= Amanda Tumusiime =

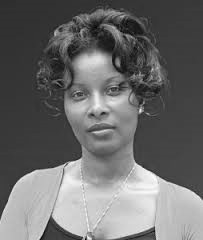
- Born: Kaharo-kabale
- Citizenship: Uganda
- Education: Makerere University
- Occupation: Artist

Amanda Tumusiime also known as Amanda Evassy Tumusiime (born in 1973) is a Ugandan Researcher, feminist, activist, art historian, and associate professor in the department of visual communication and multimedia at Makerere University.

== Background ==
Amanda Tumusiime was born in Kaharo, Kabale district in Uganda.

== Education ==
She attended Comboni Missionary School in Rukungiri and later Mary Hill Highschool in Mbarara where she represented the Red Cross Society in the Red Crescent Movement Youth Expo in Seville, Spain. Tumusiime holds a doctorate of Literature and Philosophy in History of Art from the University of South Africa, a master's and bachelor's degree in industrial and Fine Arts from Makerere University, Master's in Arts from University of the Witwatersrand, Johannesburg, in the department of Art History.

== Career ==
Tumusiime was the dean of the Margaret Trowell School of Industrial and Fine Art (MTSIFIA) and Head of the Department of Sculpture and Drawing (2010–2011) as well as Head of the Department of Visual, Communication, Design and Multimedia (20202-2022) Makerere University.

Tumusiime is a painter, art historian, and associate professor in the Department of visual communication Design, Art and Multimedia. She is a senior Research Associate at Rhodes University's Department of Fine Arts in South Africa. She uses her art to contribute to women's empowerment and emancipation.

== Awards won ==
Tumusiime received numerous awards and grants, including the African Studies Association as ASA Presidential Fellowship hosted at Princeton University, a Fulbright Scholarship, and received twice postgraduate merit award from the University of the Witwatersrand.

She is also a fellow of the Carnegie Next Generation of African Academics.

== See also ==
- Lillian Mary Nabulime
- Lydia Mugambi
- Rose Kirumira
