= OUBEY =

German painter

OUBEY (1958–2004) was a visual artist.

== Life and work ==
OUBEY attended the University of Karlsruhe from 1979 to 1983, where he studied architecture. Parallel to his studies, he developed his early works at this time.

Inspired by Prof. Fritz Haller, who gained popularity by developing the modular furniture system USM Haller, OUBEY came into contact with visionary projects such as the planning of prototypical space colonies and the futuristic concept of a global city planning, named Integral Urban. The findings of these projects, along with his thinking, and his early-on interest for science, mathematics, philosophy, poetry, science fiction and arts form the mental background for OUBEYs artistic works.

Before attending university, OUBEY already had begun to study space exploration, Newtons, Einsteins and Heisenbergs works in physics, the metaphysics of Leibniz, ancient Greek science, philosophy and arts, the geometric and musical theory of harmony, the poetry of Rilke, Celan and Trakl, as well as science fiction literature from Stansilaw Lem to Perry Rhodan. While studying the scientific work of Ilya Prigogine and his pioneering discoveries about complexity, irreversibility, chaos, order, and entropy, OUBEY found confirmation of his holistic view of the world and the cosmos.

In 1983, OUBEY decided to live and work as a freelance artist.

From 1987 to 2001, he worked in the former studio of Markus Lüpertz, where he created, amongst other works, his avant-garde computer paintings on the Amiga 500. He called them “PhotonPaintings”, and presented them 1992 in his first and very successful sales exhibition. Soon thereafter, he decided to retreat from the public, in order to work on his art independently for an indefinite period of time, as free as possible, far from any outside influence, and to only make a comeback when he thought the right time to do so had come.

After moving to a new studio, OUBEY was able to consider a new public appearance for the first time again. When OUBEY died in a traffic accident in 2004, he was in the midst of preparing for this.

During the limited time spent on his artistry, OUBEY had created a multifaceted portfolio of works, which includes over 1200 pieces of art. Through the MINDKISS project, initiated and directed by OUBEYs partner Dagmar Woyde-Koehler, these works are now posthumously made accessible to the public, step by step.

=== Movies ===
Further, the OUBEY Encounter film project plays its own role in the MINDKISS project, directed by OUBEYs partner, Dagmar Woyde-Koehler. Within the context of this project, she travels to various individuals, who are working professionally on the same subjects, share some of the same interests, or try to answer the same questions as OUBEY, presenting to them an original piece of OUBEYs art. This spontaneous encounter with one of OUBEYs pictures is documented on film and later presented online. To date, 21 of these short films have already been released on YouTube, as well as the OUBEY website. They open up very special, uncommon perspectives and views to OUBEY and his art, unlike the judgement of a traditional art expert. The following table shows an overview of the OUBEY Encounters.

OUBEY Encounter	Protagonists	Painting	Location, Date
OUBEY Encounter 1	Dr. Cecilia Scorza, Astrophysicist, Max Planck Institute in Heidelberg (MPIA)	Untitled,1986	Heidelberg (Germany), February 2010
OUBEY Encounter 2	David Letellier/Kangding Ray, Musician/Composer	Grünes Bild, 1981	Berlin(Germany), March 2010
OUBEY Encounter 3	Prof. Dr. Peter Kruse, Professor of Psychology	Untitled, 1981	Bremen (Germany), January 2010
OUBEY Encounter 4	Liz Howard, Mezzo-soprano	Stürzender Engel, 1992	Munich (Germany), December 2009
OUBEY Encounter 5	Frans Boeckhorst, System Research Psychologist	Reise der Monaden, 1982	Nijmwegen (Netherlands), March 2010
OUBEY Encounter 6	Prof. Dr. Friedemann Schrenk, Palaeonthropologist	Untitled, 1988	Frankfurt (Germany), July 2010
OUBEY Encounter 7	Luise Neukirch, High School Student	ANYTHINK: Leeroy, 1986	Berlin (Germany), March 2010
OUBEY Encounter 8	Prof. Dr. Stuart Kauffman, Medical Doctor and Biologist	Untitled, 1986	Santa Fe (United States), August 2010
OUBEY Encounter 9	Uwe Anton, Perry Rhodan Exposé Author	Untitled, 1981/82	Wuppertal (Germany), May 2010
OUBEY Encounter 10	David Weinberger, Senior Researcher at Harvard's Berkman Center For Internet & Society	Titanic, 1985	Brookline (United States), February 2010
OUBEY Encounter 11	Helena, Kassidy, Laetitia, Sophia and Yannik, Primary School Students	Untitled, 1993/94	Munich (Germany), May 2010
OUBEY Encounter 12	Prof. Dr. Alexander Deichsel, Professor of Brand Sociology	Reise der Monaden, 1982	Geneva (Switzerland), August 2010
OUBEY Encounter 13	Dr. Seth Shostak, Chief Astronomer SETI Institute	Krypto, 1987	Mountain View (United States), April 2012
OUBEY Encounter 14	Prof. Lawrence M. Krauss, Theoretical Physicist and Cosmologist	Untitled, 1987	Tempe (United States), April 2012
OUBEY Encounter 15	Joe Betts-LaCroix, executive director at Health Extension	Pferdekopfnebel / Horsehead Nebula, 1987	Belmont (United States), October 2012
OUBEY Encounter 16	Prof. Rainer Blatt, Experimental Physicist, University of Innsbruck and Institute for Quantum Optics and Quantum Information of the Austrian Academy of Sciences	Untitled, 1987	Innsbruck (Austria), September 2011
OUBEY Encounter 17	Elena, Violinist	27 Cube Memory System, 1987	Wellington (New Zealand) March 2012
OUBEY Encounter 18	Tanemahuta Gray, artistic director, Producer, Choreographer	Morphogenese, 1981/82	Paraparaumu Aotearoa (New Zealand), March 2012
OUBEY Encounter 19	Daniel Opitz, Marine Biologist, Nature Filmmaker	Zero Field, 1986	Pa´ia/Maui (Hawaii), May 2013
OUBEY Encounter 20	Prof. Karl Sigmund, Mathematician	Untitled, 1985	Vienna (Austria), September 2011
OUBEY Encounter 21	Robby Seeger, Giant Wave Surfer	Untitled, 1996	Haiku/Maui (Hawaii), May 2013
OUBEY Encounter 22	Indy Johar, Architect	Untitled, 1991	London (UK), August 2014
OUBEY Encounter 23	Dallas Seymour, Ex-Rugby International of the „All Blacks	Samurai, 1985	Wellington (New Zealand), March 2014
OUBEY Encounter 24	Ten Year old Boy, Student	Untitled, 1996	Kampala (Uganda), December 2015
OUBEY Encounter 25	Dr. Kizito Maria Kasule, Artist, Academic	Untitled, 1984	Kampala (Uganda), December 2015

=== Exhibitions ===
From 2012, the Global Encounter-Tour presented more of OUBEYs originals to a bigger audience at various places.

First Stopover: October 2012
“OUBEY - Visions: Through Art to science”. Symposium at the Goethe Institute, San Francisco in cooperation with the Academy of Arts University. Contributions by Dr. Seth Shostak, SETI Institute Mountain View/Nina McCurdy, University of Santa Cruz/Joe Betts-LaCroix, Health Salon Series San Francisco/Peter Erlenwein, author and sociologist.

Second Stopover: March 2013
“The Joy of Insight”. Keynote by Prof. Peter Kruse at the Direktorenhaus in Berlin.

Third Stopover: November 2013
“OUBEY – Art & Complexity”. OUBEY at Global Peter Drucker Forum 2013 in Vienna.

Fourth Stopover: March 2014

“An Element of the Universal”. OUBEY at Te Kura Kaupapa Maori O Nga Mokopuna Maori school in Seatoun/Wellington, Aotearoa New Zealand.

Sixth Stopover: May 2015

“OUBEY MINDKISS 5th Anniversary Happening”. OUBEY at the Center for Art and Media, Germany.

Seventh Stopover: December 2015

“Immediacy is Crucial”. OUBEY at the Nagandu International Academy of Art and Design (NIAAD) in Kampala, Uganda.

== Publications ==
- 1992: Mindkiss – The Photopainting, catalogue, ed. by Atelier O.U.B.E.Y (dt. and engl.).
- 2010: OUBEY Mindkiss, Deutscher Kunstverlag Berlin, ed. by Dagmar Woyde-Koehler, conception: Stefan Sagmeister, Dagmar Woyde-Koehler, ISBN 978-3-422-06797-4.
- 2011: OUBEY 2011, ed. by Engelhardt & Bauer, conception and design: MAGMA Design.
- 2012: we and the arts, ed. by we_magazine.
- 2014: Wir haben uns erkannt, in: brand eins, No. 01/2014 Schwerpunkt: Originalität, p. 100 - 106.
- 2014: Dagmar Woyde-Koehler - „Es geht darum, das Universum, vielleicht auch die vielen Universen, zu erforschen.“, by Raphael Rusitzka, May 13, 2014, on: Galore Interviews

== Awards ==
OUBEY Mindkiss

- 2010 red dot Design Award
- 2010 AIGA (American Institute of Graphic Arts) New York: 50 Books/50 Covers Award
- 2010 Communication Art: Award of Excellence

OUBEY

- 2011 Gregor Calendar Award: Hauptpreis Gregor Award
- 2011 Type Directors Club New York: Certificate of Typographic Excellence

== Literature ==
- Koehler, Wendelin (1992), Atelier O.U.B.E.Y (ed.), MINDKISS THE PHOTONPAINTING; Ausstellungskatalog (in German), Karlsruhe
- Dagmar Woyde-Koehler, ed. (2010), Mindkiss (in German), Berlin: Deutscher Kunstverlag, ISBN 978-3-422-06797-4
- Oubey, 2011: von der Entdeckung eines verborgenen Schatzes; E & B Kunstkalender (in German), Karlsruhe: Engelhardt & Bauer Verlag, 2010
