= Pamela Enyonu =

Ugandan visual artist

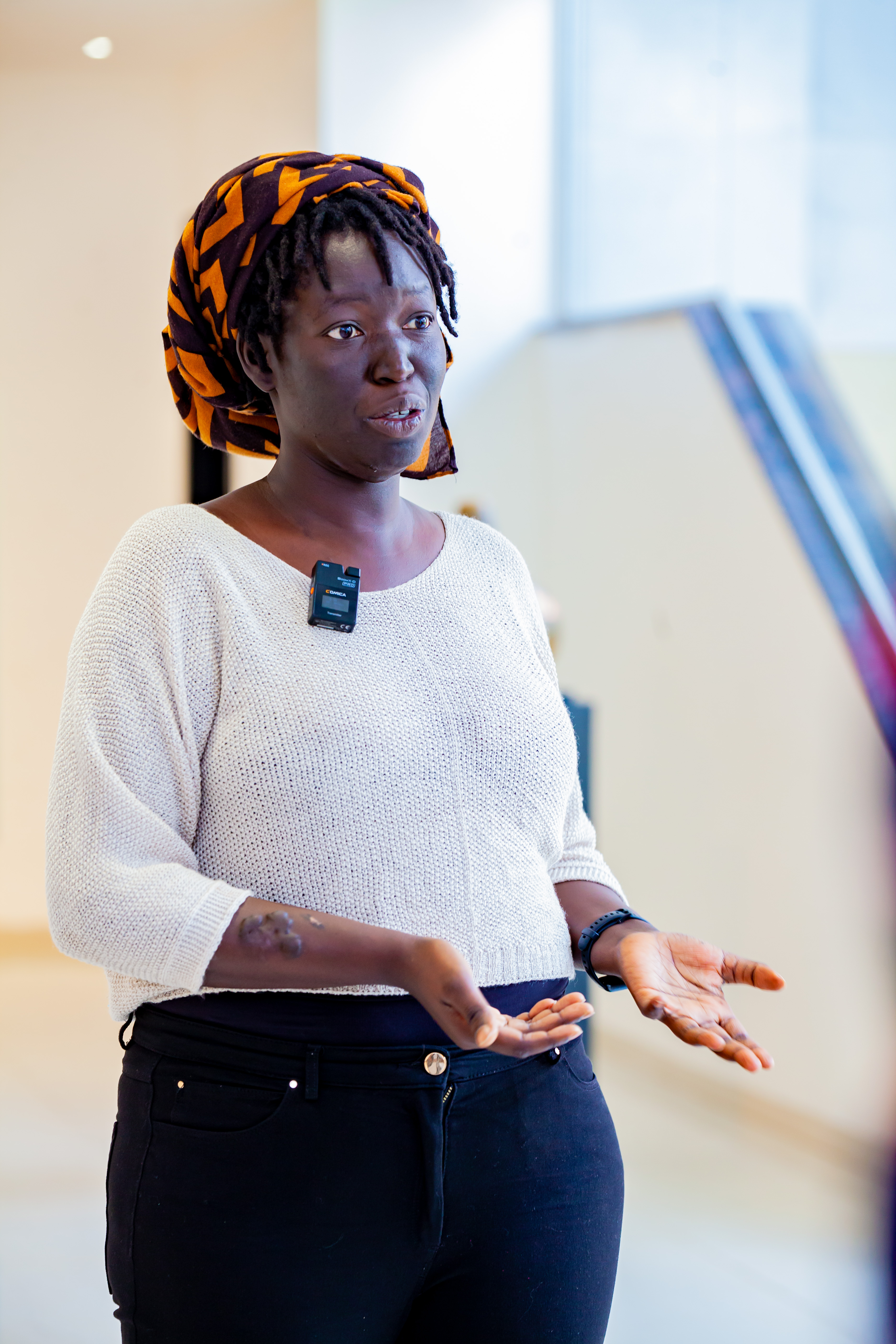
- Pamela Enyonu.jpg
- Education: Kyambogo University
- Known for: collage, painting, photography
- Awards: Musoke Art Prize 2018

Pamela Enyonu (born 1985) is a Ugandan artist born and raised in Uganda who won the Mukumbya Musoke Art Prize 2018. She was the first artist in residence for the Art Rights Truth research project. She uses collage, painting, photography and assemblage with a focus on the politics of identity, trauma and healing.

== Education and career history ==
She studied Art and Design from Kyambogo University. However, her art career started in 2017 with a 3 months residency at 32 degrees East, in Kampala. Pamela hosted her first exhibition in June 2017. In 2020, she had an artist's residency in Paris. In 2022, Pamela concluded her residency at AKKA Project in Venice, and also Zurich, hosted by ProHelvetia.

== See also ==
- Rose Kirumira
- Acaye Kerunen
- Afriart Gallery
