= Olivia Mary Nantongo =

Ugandan artist (born 1994)

- Born: January 27, 1994 (age 32); Kampala, Uganda
- Education: Bachelor of Industrial and Fine Arts, Makerere University
- Occupation: Visual artist
- Known for: Mixed media artworks; portraits highlighting identity and pride of African women
- Parent(s): Gynecologist father; businesswoman mother

Olivia Mary Nantongo (born 27 January 1994, Kampala) is a Ugandan visual artist known for her mixed media artworks like portraits that focus on capturing the identity and pride of African women.

== Early life and education ==
Olivia Mary Nantongo was born on 27 January 1994, in Kampala, Uganda, to a gynecologist father and businesswoman mother, as the only daughter in a family of six children. She holds a Bachelor of Industrial and Fine Arts degree from Makerere University in Uganda.

== Artistic career ==
Nantongo is a mixed media artist who focuses portraying African women as independent and strong. Her works emphasize themes of self love, liberation and the celebration of dark skinned women, representing a visual dialogue about beauty standards and societal pressures.

== Exhibitions and recognitions ==
=== Solo exhibitions ===
- I am a woman (2025), Xenson Art Space, Kampala.

=== Group exhibitions ===
- ECHOES (July 22-August 15, 2023), with Ethel Aanyu and Allan Kyakonye, Kampala
- Embracing Her Essence: A Celebration of Young Women's Creativity (March-April 2024), Xenson Art Space, Kampala
- 1-54 Contemporary African Art Fair (May 2024), New York City
- Wandala - drama. dream. decolonised (2026), Offenes Kulturhaus (OK) Linz, Austria

== See also ==
- Contemporary African art
- Women artists
- Margaret Zzziwa
- Afriart Gallery
- Carol Nantongo
