= Nommo Gallery Museum =

Art Gallery in Kampala, Uganda

Nommo Gallery
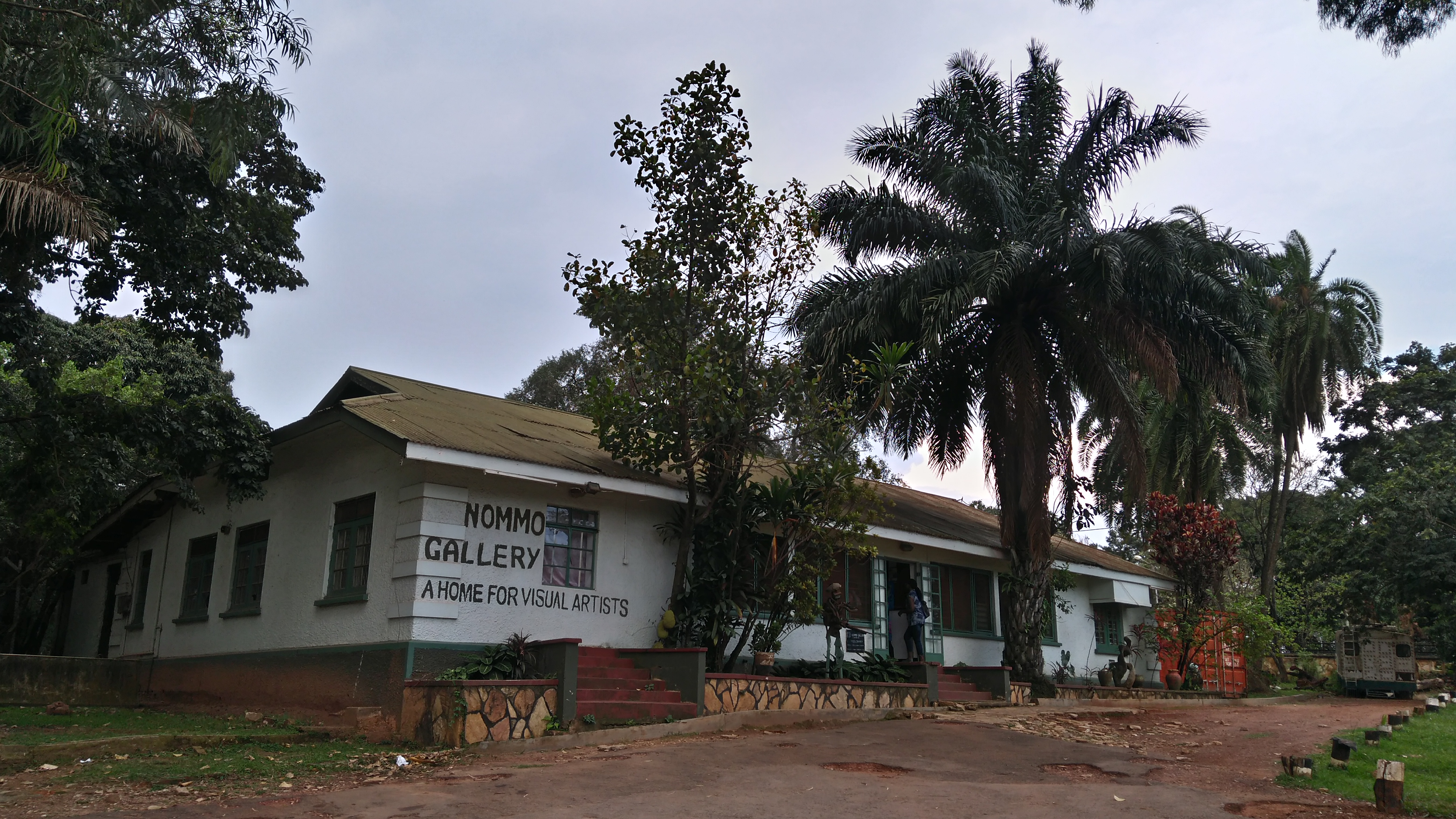
- Nommo Art Gallery Building
- Established: 1964
- Location: Plot 4, Victoria Avenue, Nakasero, Kampala, Uganda
- Type: Art museum
- Founder: Barbara Neogy Lapcek
- Director: Fabian Mpagi (former)
- Curator: Phillip Balimunsi
- Owner: Uganda National Cultural Centre
- Public transit access: Near State Lodge, Kampala

Nommo gallery is a public gallery in Uganda established by the Act of Parliament of Uganda National Cultural Centre of 1959. It was founded in 1964 by an American lady called Barbara Neogy Lapcek. Nommo gallery was originally located at an old building along Kampala Road, however, the building was demolished, and the gallery was moved to Plot 4 Victoria Avenue, Nakasero, in the heart of Kampala, Uganda, next to the State Lodge.

== History ==
In 1964, the Nommo gallery, which was the very first gallery in East Africa, was founded by an American woman called Barbara Neogy Lapcek. It was a central hub for visual arts that played a vital role in the development and collection of art in Ugandan. The name nommo was derived from an Ibo word which means creator and it was the very first home of Ugandan art. To promote art and culture, a house was given to visual artistes by the then president and it was officially opened as the Nommo gallery by the then first Lady, Miria Obote.

The gallery was neglected due to political turmoil during Idi Amin's regime which left most of the artists as exiles. However, it continued to be a key institution for the cultural preservation and development of Uganda.

The late General Elly Tumwine was appointed the chairperson of the Board of Trustees of the Uganda National Cultural Centre in 1992. This appointment came with the responsibility of caring for the National Theatre, a community house in Mengo and the Nommo gallery. In order to promote art and culture, the latter was transformed into a habitable space by the late General Elly Tumwine who later on worked with numerous artistes to organize exhibitions at the gallery. The late Fabian Mpagi, an artist was appointed by the board as the director of Nommo gallery. Phillip Balimunsi is the curator of Nommo National gallery.

== Collections ==
Nommo gallery, a hub of artistic expression has an assortment of art masterpieces. These range from paintings, batiks (tie-and-dye), ceramics, art prints, photographs and sculptors, among others. Exhibitions of works of art by both Ugandan and foreign artists are feature at the Nommo gallery. The gallery hosts solo exhibitions for instance, in November, 2016, visual artists from the East African region gathered for a painting exhibition under the rubric of cultural diversity at Nommo gallery and the collective memories exhibition among others.

Much of the work exhibited at the gallery is a representation of African culture and life in Uganda. The themes portrayed through the art range from local subjects such as the daily challenges of life in Uganda, domestic violence, child abuse, moral decadence, corruption and poverty among others.

The layout of the gallery connects visitors and the artworks displayed. With regular exhibitions and events, visitors witness live art demonstrations and meet the artists behind the works.

== Architecture ==
The gallery is a historic, small green building located on government property in Kampala. It is surrounded by ancient trees and a large spacious compound with two restaurants and a crafts shop called Bindi by its side. Pearl restaurant is made out of thatch and wood while the building housing the café and craft shop is made of iron sheets.

== See also ==
- Afriart gallery Uganda
- Uganda Museum
- Uganda National Cultural Centre
