= Ignatius Sserulyo =

Ugandan painter (born c. 1937)

- Born: c. 1937; Masaka District, Uganda
- Died: December 2018; Uganda
- Citizenship: Uganda
- Education: Fine art
- Alma mater: Makerere University
- Occupations: Painter, sculptor, art lecturer
- Years active: 1960s–2018
- Employer(s): Margaret Trowell School of Industrial and Fine Art, Makerere University
- Known for: Painting, mural art, sculpture; advocacy for decolonisation of art
- Notable work: Crime and Punishment (mural, 1962); Old Woman (1963); Frog; Mural paintings at St. Francis Chapel and Mary Stuart Hall, Makerere University
- Children: 15
- Relatives: Lawrence Musoke (nephew)

Ignatius Sserulyo (born c. 1937- December 2018) is a Ugandan painter, a former student and lecturer at Margret Trowel School of Industrial and Fine Art at Makerere University.

== Early life and education ==
Sserulyo was born in 1937 and grew up in South eastern district of Masaka. He attained a 1st class degree in art from Makerere University in 1962 and a masters in 1976.

== Career ==
Sserulyo was a lecturer at Margret Trowel School of Industrial and Fine Art at Makerere University. His paintings can be seen on the ceiling of St Francis Chapel, Makerere University and Mary Stuart Hall. He advocated for the decolonization of art to allow inclusion of indigenous lifestyles and forms which made him to compose a mural painting at the sculpture studio. His sculpture titled "old woman 1963" depicts the nature of anatomy, "Frog" and the human figure with sagging breasts seated on a dais are found along the art gallery.

His mural titled 'Crime and Punishment" was commissioned by the Prisons department and executed it in 1962 when he was still a student at Makerere University. In 1986 during his International Visitor Programme in Sacramental City, California he came up with a paint showing the winter season in a western Country. He is also the author of a sculpture located at Sharing Youth Centre courtyard in Nsambya. He was a team leader during the decoration of Kabaka of Buganda, Ronald Muwenda Mutebi's wedding podium in 1999.

== Personal life ==
He is married and has fifteen children and several grandchildren. Nine of his children are university graduates, while the others are undergraduates at various universities. His senior wife is a senior consultant in gynecology at Mulago Hospital. He was an uncle to Lawrence Musoke a visual artist.

== Death ==
Sserulyo died in 2018.

== See also ==
- Theresa Musoke
