= Hubert Carey Trowell =

British physician (1904–1989)

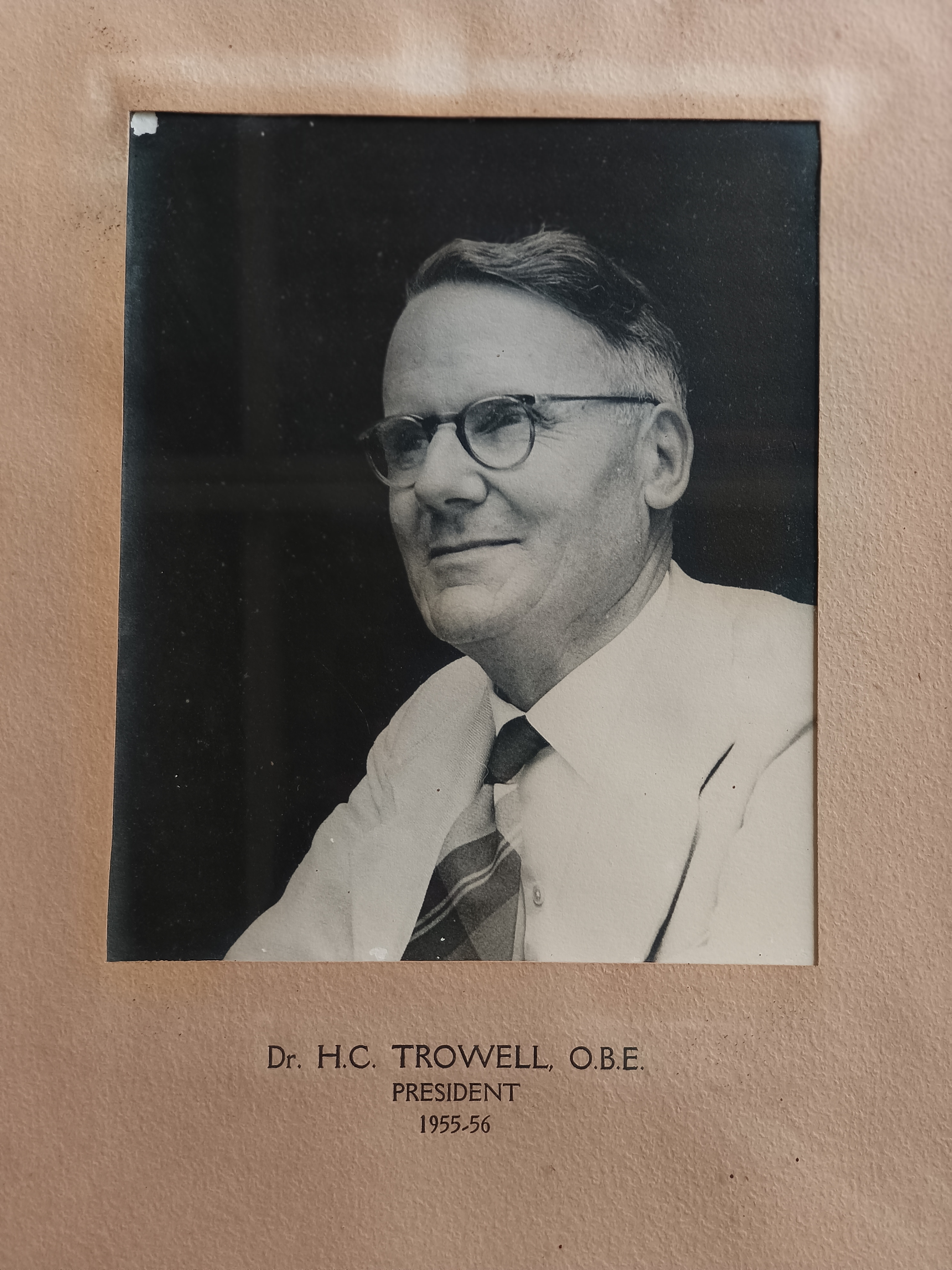
- Born: 8 August 1904
- Died: 23 July 1989 (aged 84)
- Education: Reigate Grammar School
- Occupation: Physician
- Title: President of the Uganda Society
- Term: 1955-1956
- Predecessor: Audrey Richards
- Successor: D.K Marphatia
- Spouse: Margaret Trowell

Hubert "Hugh" Carey Trowell (8 August 1904 – 23 July 1989) OBE, FRCP was a British physician known for his research on dietary fiber and protein–energy malnutrition.

== Biography ==
Trowell was educated at Reigate Grammar School and studied medicine at St Thomas' Hospital. In 1929, he joined the Colonial Medical Service in Kenya.

Based on his medical work in Kenya and Uganda (1929–1958), he identified a condition known as protein–energy malnutrition. From 1935 until his retirement in 1959, he worked as a consultant physician and paediatrician at Mulago Hospital and Medical School in Kampala, Uganda.

Trowell was internationally acknowledged as an authority on Kwashiorkor. He was the first to discover that serum albumin concentration in children with kwashiorkor was below normal which was used to support the hypothesis that a protein deficient diet was responsible for the condition.

With his colleague Denis P. Burkitt, Trowell was influential in promoting dietary fiber. He developed the fiber hypothesis in a series of books and papers with Burkitt in the 1970s and 80s. Their research showed that diets low in fiber increase the risk of coronary heart disease, diabetes, obesity and large bowel conditions such as colorectal cancer, appendicitis and diverticulosis. The British Medical Journal describes Trowell as "probably the first person to link diets deficient in fibre with obesity, diabetes and coronary heart disease."

After his retirement from medicine, he became an ordained minister in the Anglican ministry.

== Selected publications ==
- Kwashiorkor (with R. F. A. Dean and J. N. P. Davies, 1954)
- Non-Infective Disease in Africa (1960)
- Diagnosis and Treatment of Diseases in the Tropics (with J. R. Billinghurst, 1968)
- The Unfinished Debate on Euthanasia (1973)
- Refined Carbohydrate Foods and Disease: Some Implications of Dietary Fibre (with Denis P. Burkitt, 1975)
- Dietary Fibre and Colonic Diseases (1976)
- Dietary Fibre in Human Nutrition: A Bibliography (1979)
- Western Diseases: Their Emergence and Prevention (with Denis P. Burkitt, 1981)
- Dietary Fibre, Fibre-Depleted Foods and Disease (1985)

== See also ==
- Thomas L. Cleave
- Margaret Trowell
- The Uganda Society
