= Nuwa Wamala Nnyanzi =

Ugandan artist (born 1952)

- Born: 28 October 1952 (age 74); Uganda
- Citizenship: Uganda
- Education: CTC YMCA Kenya (Diploma in Industrial Art & Design); Middlesex University (Master of Arts)
- Occupations: Artist, entrepreneur, cultural leader
- Years active: 1978 – present
- Known for: Art, Leadership

Nuwa Wamala Nnyanzi (born 28 October 1952), commonly known as Nuwa Nnyanzi, is a multi-media visual artist in Uganda. He is the founder, owner, and chief executive officer of the Nnyanzi Art Studio in Kampala, Uganda's capital city.

== Background and education ==
He was born in Uganda's Central Region. His father was a laboratory assistant and his mother was a nurse-midwife. He holds a diploma in industrial art and design from the CTS YMCA in Nairobi, Kenya. His Master of Arts degree was obtained from Middlesex University in the United Kingdom.

== Career ==
From 1978 until 1992, Nnyanzi lived in political exile in Nairobi. While there, he began painting and sculpting on his own. He honed his craft and earned a living off of his self-taught skill, until he made enough money to pay for art lessons. In 1992, he returned to Uganda and opened the Nnyanzi Art Studio. He has since "committed his life to producing, collecting, documenting and promoting Uganda's rich cultural and natural heritage and that of the Great Lakes region". He has held several workshops, demonstrations, lectures, and displays about this topic in various overseas countries including Kenya, South Africa, the United Kingdom, Australia, and the United States.

== Other responsibilities ==
Nuwa Nnyanzi serves in these positions, in addition to his full-time occupation: (1) Minister of Culture and Art in the cabinet of the Buganda Kingdom (2) Chairman of the Uganda Artists' Association (3) Chairman of the Kampala Central Branch of the Uganda Red Cross (4) President of the Rotary Club of Kampala West and (5) Director of the Uganda National Arts and Crafts Village.

== Personal ==
He is a married father of two children.
