= Betty Manyolo =

Ugandan painter and printmaker (1938–1999)

- Born: Estella Betty Babirye Nakayemba Manyolo; 1938; Kampala, Uganda
- Died: 1999 (aged 60–61)
- Other name: Betty Sangowawa
- Education: Makerere University
- Occupations: Painter and printmaker

Estelle Betty Manyolo (1938–1999) was a Ugandan art painter and printmaker. Her work was inspired by black and white house murals created by the Bahima people and the Kakoro and Nyero rock paintings in Eastern Uganda.

== Early life and education ==
Estella Betty Babirye Nakayemba Manyolo was born in 1938 in Kampala, Uganda. Known as Betty Manyolo, she was a Muganda, and one of ten children. Her middle name Babirye indicates that she was the elder of twins, it being a traditional name given to the older female twin. Twins were considered a blessing in Buganda and she spent her school holidays at the palace of King Muteesa II, where twins took on ceremonial roles in the palace. Her older brother inspired her to study art.

Manyolo studied at Gayaza High School, earning a Junior Secondary School Certificate in 1953 and an Overseas School Certificate from Cambridge University through the school in 1955. She graduated from the Margaret Trowell School of Fine Art at Makerere College in 1960 with a diploma in fine arts.

== Career ==
Manyolo's work was deeply inspired by Ugandan culture and folklore.

In 1961, Cecil Todd from Makerere University took some of Manyolo's pieces to New York, and her works were added to the Harmon Foundation touring collection, eventually being donated to Fisk University in 1991.

Manyolo illustrated the book Awo olwatuuka in 1961. She later worked as a teacher in Abidjan, Ivory Coast and travelled to France, having learned to speak French.

Between 1973 and 1977, she worked as an artist for the Ugandan Health Ministry in Entebbe, designing imagery for the Department of Public Health and Hygiene. After fleeing political unrest, she worked as an Art Design Supervisor for the Nigerian Television Authority until 1989, before returning to Uganda.

== Selected work ==
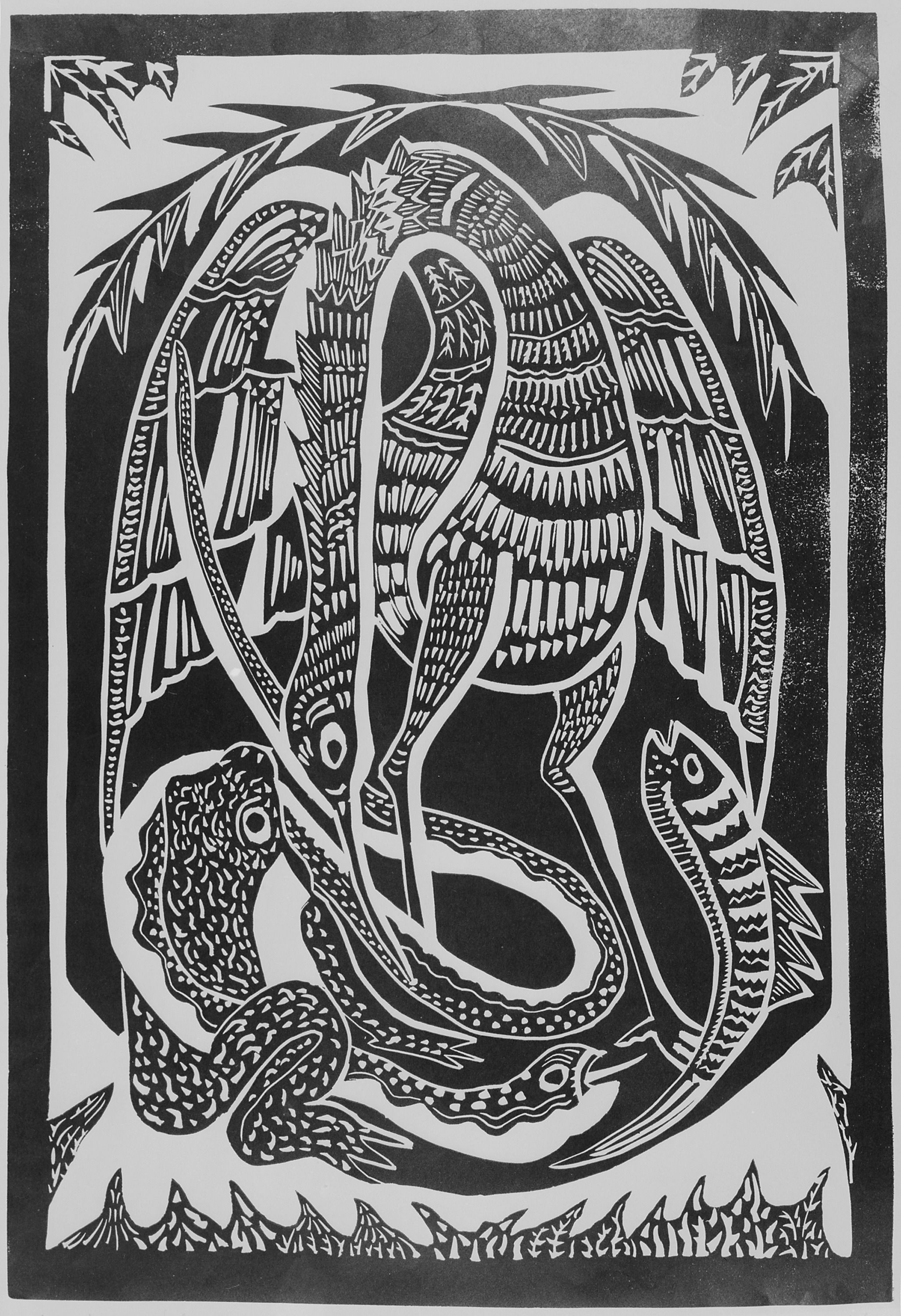
African Fable

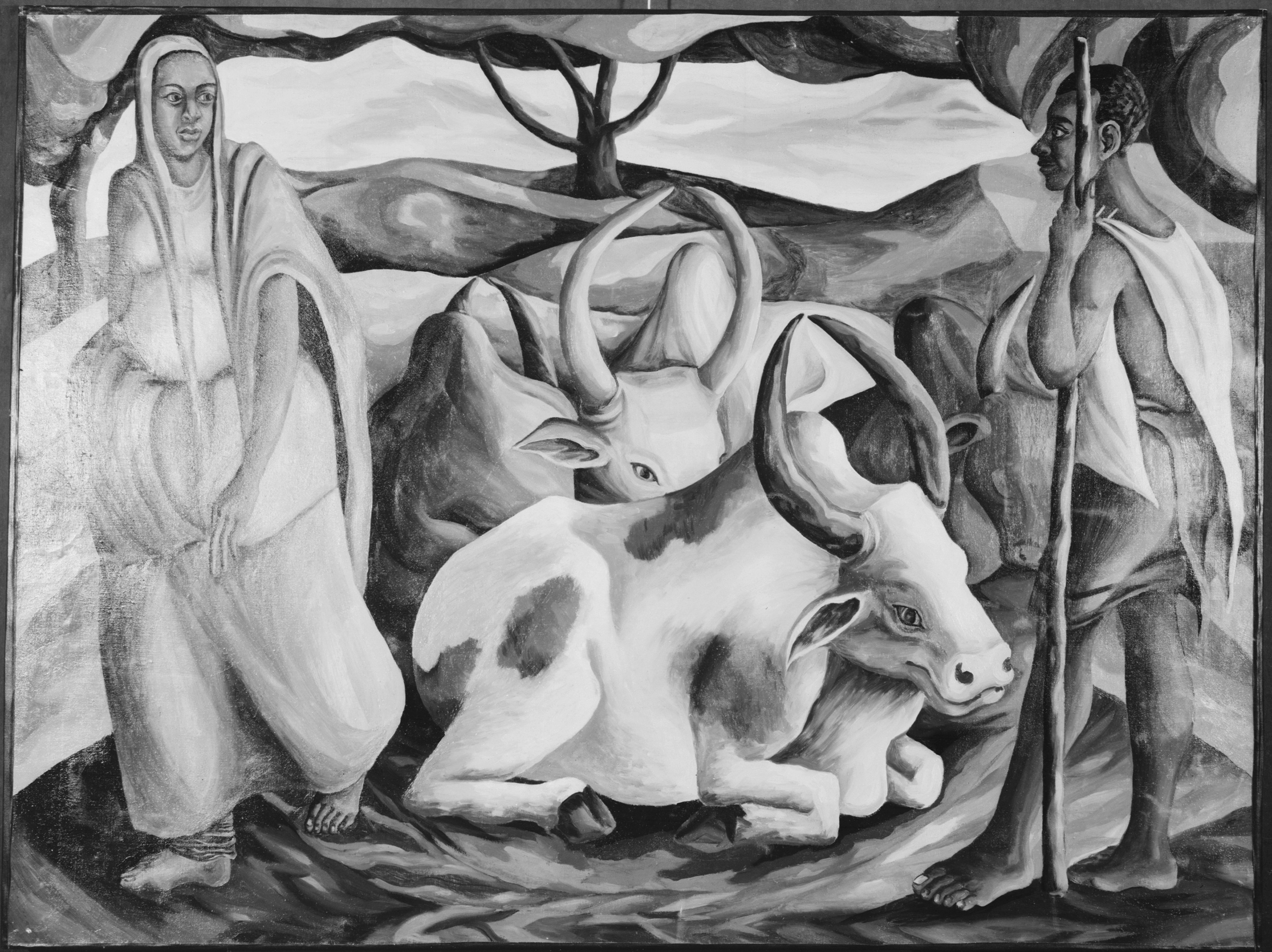
Cattle People

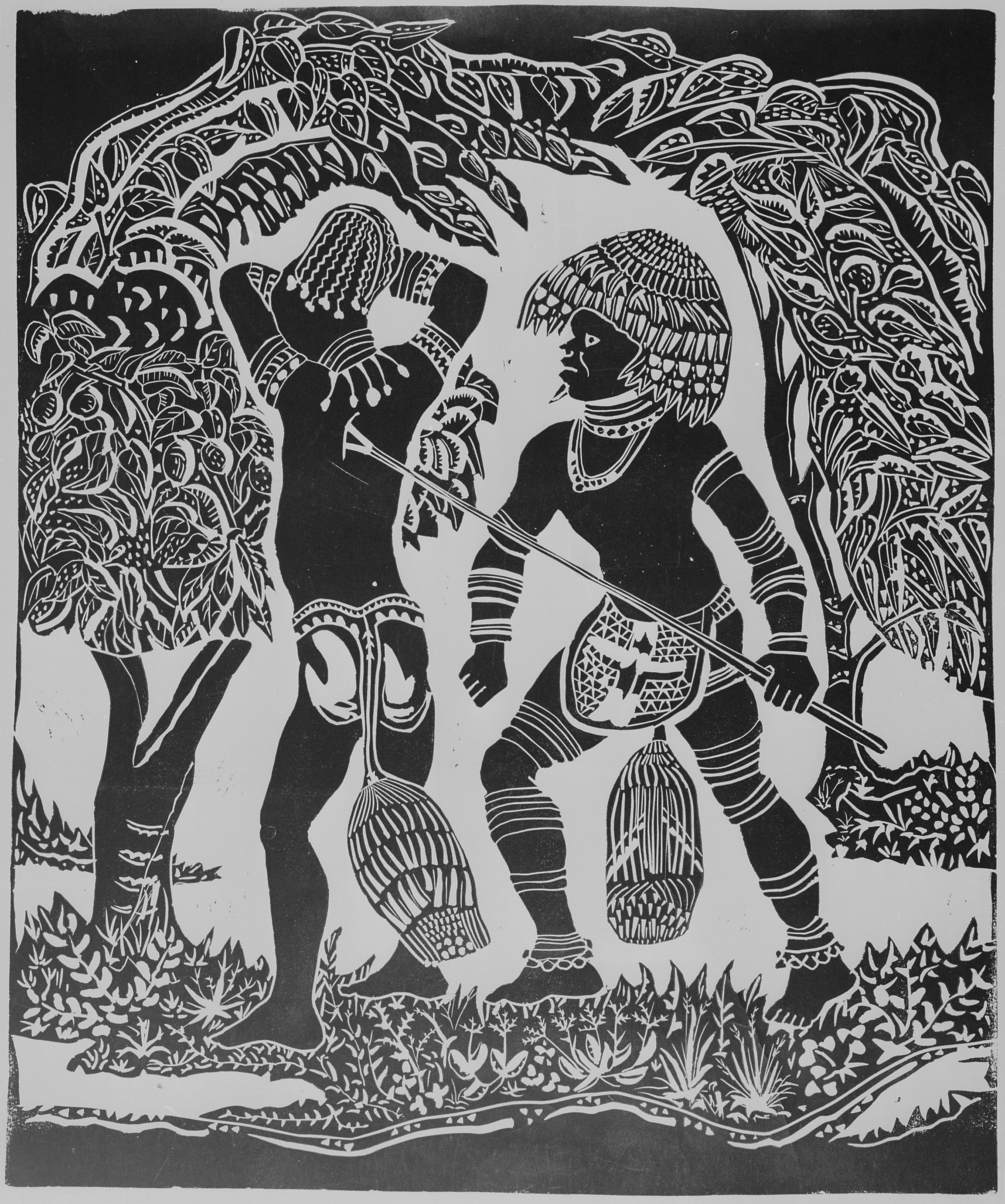
Death in the Forest

== Personal life ==
In the 1960s, Betty Manyolo married a Nigerian man and took his surname of Sangowawa. Their family moved to Nigeria, where she worked as a teacher, before moving to the Ivory Coast. She lived in Uganda again from 1973 to 1977, but left for Nigeria as Uganda became increasingly unsafe under the dictatorship of Idi Amin. Manyolo returned to Uganda once more in 1989.

Betty Manyolo died of breast cancer aged 64 in 1999. She was survived by five children and ten grandchildren.

== Exhibitions ==
Several of Manyolo's linocut prints, along with an oil painting, were exhibited through the Harmon Foundation beginning in 1961; her work was also included in the Smithsonian Institution Traveling Exhibit of Contemporary African Printmakers from 1966 to 1968. From October 2023 to January 2024, her Cattle People (1961) was included in African Modernism in America, 1947-67 at the Philips Collection in Washington DC, loaned from the Fisk University Galleries collection following donation by the Harmon Foundation.
