= NIAAD =

Art school in Uganda

NIAAD (Naggenda International Academy of Art and Design) is a private non-profit college of art and design, fully registered and recognized by the national council for higher education. It is located in plot 216 on the Lutembe beach road of the Entebbe-Kampala Highway, Uganda.

Currently serving as both an Art College and a community organization, NIAAD was established in 2009 by its current chairman and CEO, Dr. Kizito Maria Kasule. NIAAD’s study program offers the following topics:

- Diploma in fine art
- Diploma in communication design
- Diploma in art education
- Diploma in fashion design
- Diploma in textile and jewellery design
- Certificate in art and design

The academy’s courses are divided between 3 departments: the department of art, department of design and the department of education. Besides functioning as an art school, NIAAD is also a community and charity organization. The academy’s staff and students are participating in several community projects such as the Community art project: NIAAD students decorate the streets of capital city Kampala with their artwork, the women group: students teach local widows and other needy women useful skills such as knitting and jewelry producing in order to provide the women with a source of income, and art teaching project: students are voluntarily teaching art at local primary schools across Masaka and Kampala.
