= Sungi Mlengeya =

Tanzanian artist

- Born: 1991 (age 34–35)
- Occupation: Contemporary painter
- Website: https://sungimlengeya.com/

Sungi Mlengeya (born 1991) is a Tanzanian self-taught artist who paints minimalistic portraits, often depicting black women and negative space.

== Early life ==
Born and raised in Tanzania, Mlengeya grew up partly in a national park raised by two veterinarians. She expressed an interest in art and drawing in primary school, though her secondary school did not offer art classes.

After graduating in 2013, Mlengeya worked in banking, and painted on the side. In 2018, she left her job to pursue a painting career, turning to the internet to learn new techniques. With the help of a close friend, she sold her first piece in her hometown, Arusha. She traveled throughout East Africa to connect with artists and galleries, including Afriart Gallery, which introduced her to the global art world.

While Mlengeya's early works share themes, subject matter, and mediums with her recent pieces, her style has evolved over the years. One early work, Strips contrasts with her more recent style by incorporating highly saturated strips of red and yellow within the piece. Mlengeya has focused more on black and white backgrounds in recent pieces.

== Exhibitions ==
In February 2020, Mlengeya had a solo booth with several pieces at the Investec Cape Town Art Fair.

After the outbreak of the COVID-19 pandemic, Mlengeya took part in online exhibits, showing her piece, friend, in Unit London's Drawn Together, which ran from June to July 2020. The exhibit featured over 150 international artists, with proceeds going towards Medicins Sans Frontieres and World Vision.

In July 2021, Mlengeya participated alongside 25 female artists of African descent for A Force for Change in New York City, showing her piece, Up.

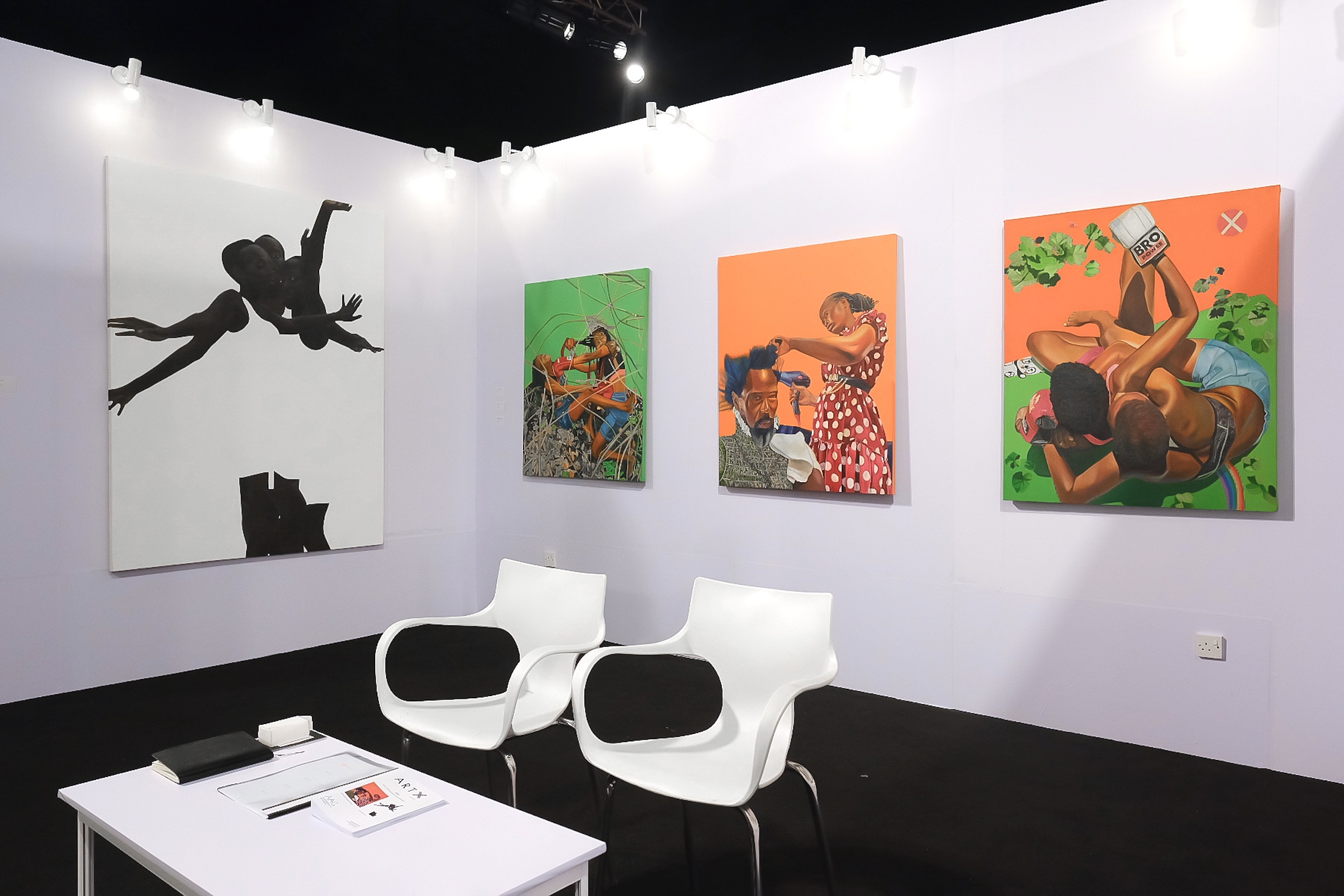
Sungi Mlengeya represented by Afriart Gallery at Art X Lagos 2022

=== Just Disruptions ===
In 2021, Mlengeya's debut solo exhibition, Just Disruptions, opened at Afriart Gallery, in Kampala, Uganda. Just Disruptions was a collection of pieces that depicted the development of Mlengeya's distinct art style but also manifested the growth of black women and their road to change how they are perceived, which in turn, "challenges our short-span attention economy". A major theme of Mlengeya's work is identity, shown through the blocked-out bodies in her pieces and the questions surrounding these works, ultimately focusing it on "freeing" black women from the social expectations.

==== 2022 Exhibitions ====
In June 2022, her second solo exhibition, (Un)Choreographed opened at the Africa Centre in Southwark, London. Another solo show, Don't Try, Don't Not Try opened at the B.LA Art Foundation in Vienna, Austria in September 2022. Partial proceeds from the exhibition went to another Vienna organization, Women without Borders.
