= Sandra Suubi =

Ugandan gospel musician (born 1990)

- Born: 1990 (age 35–36); Kampala, Uganda
- Education: Makerere University (BFA, MFA)
- Occupations: Musician; visual artist
- Years active: 2011–present
- Musical career
- Genres: Gospel
- Website: sandrasuubi.com

Sandra Suubi (born 1990) is a Ugandan gospel musician and visual artist.

== Early years and education ==
Suubi was born in Kampala, Uganda in 1990. She had her primary education at Greenhill Academy and her secondary education Gayaza High School, both in Kampala. She attended the Makerere University where she acquired a bachelor's degree in Fine Arts from the Margaret Trowell School of Industrial and Fine Art. In January 2018, she graduated from the same University with a master's degree in Fine Arts.

== Career ==
While in secondary school, Suubi was part of the school's chapel choir. She began her career as a musician in 2011 when she joined a girl group called Xabu under the direction of First Love. With the group, she began performing at different events while at the university. In 2015, the group split, so she joined the Airtel Trace Music competition and won. She went on to represent Uganda in the East African category at the International level of the competition. She released her debut album in 2016 which features two singles, "Togwamu Suubi" and "Nsiimye". Her song, "Togwamu Subi" was featured in the soundtrack of the award-winning film Veronica's Wish in 2018. She released her second album in 2018 which features songs including "Onjagande nyo", "Kingdom come", "Heaven" and "Jangu Tuzine".

Aside from music, Suubi works as an eco-artist. She recycles plastic waste to create installations, stage backdrops, jewelry and home decorations. Her artwork has been featured in different Kampala art festivals like the stage backdrop for Bayimba International Festival of the Arts 2013, a headphones piece at the Laba Arts Festival in 2014, a Bodaboda helmet and a conceptual bird piece for Kampala.

== Discography ==
- Anthems of Life (2016)
- Anthems of Life EP (2018)
- Faya

== Awards ==
- Best New Artiste of the year 2015 – Victoria Gospel Academy (VIGA) Awards
- Upcoming Female Artist of the year 2016 – VIGA Awards
