= Peter Kruse =

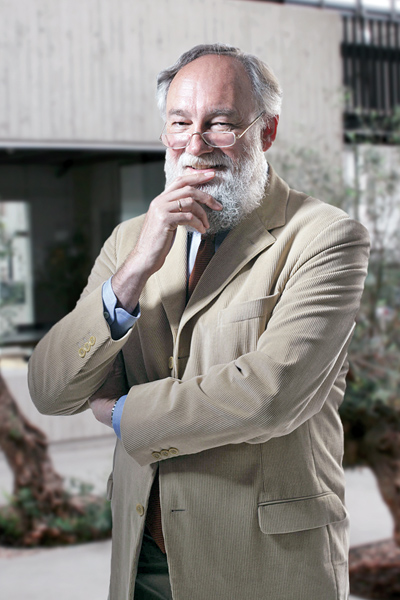
Peter Kruse, 2008

Peter Kruse (30 January 1955 – 1 June 2015) was honorary professor of organizational psychology at the University of Bremen and professional consultant for collective intelligence. His main field of research was processing of complexity and autonomous order formation in intelligent networks. His interdisciplinary work focused on the application of collective intelligence to economic and social developments.

== Life ==
Kruse was born in Osnabrück, Lower Saxony in 1955. After graduating in psychology, biology and human medicine, Peter Kruse received his Ph.D.in 1984 with summa cum laude honours. He worked for over 15 years at various German universities in the field of brain research where his key interest was in processing of complexity and autonomous order formation in intelligent networks. In 1994 he won the University of Bremen's Berninghausen Prize for innovative teaching and in 2003 the Teaching Award in Gold from the ZfU International Business School of Thalwil, Switzerland.

Kruse wrote over two hundred scientific and popular publications. In 2004 he won the Social Democratic Party of Germany's Innovation Prize for entrepreneurial dedication and in 2007, "Personalmagazin", a German monthly publication for human resources professionals, listed him among 40 influential persons in HR management. He died on 1 June 2015 due to heart failure .

== Selected Scientific Work ==
- Kruse, P./Stadler, M. 1993: The significance of nonlinear phenomena for the investigation of cognitive systems. In Haken, H./Mikhailov, A. S. (eds.): Interdisciplinary approaches to nonlinear complex systems. Berlin: Springer, pp. 138–160, ISBN 3-540-56834-4.
- Kruse, P./Stadler, M. 1995 (eds.): Ambiguity in nature and mind. Multistability in cognition. Berlin: Springer, ISBN 3-540-57082-9.

== Articles and Interviews ==
- Kruse, Peter (2011). "Soft Values, Hard Facts". Think Quarterly. Archived from the original on 2013-02-05.
- Kruse, Peter (2010). "The Network Is Challenging Us (print and online)". we-magazine.
- Kruse, Peter (2011). "Moving beyond Left, Right and Center: How Politics Grapples with the Challenge of Participation". Emotions in Politics and Campaigning. EAPC-Books.

== Selected publications ==
- Kruse, Peter (2011). "Culture outpaces Technology, published in: Thrive, Magazine of the Global Economic Symposium 2011". Kiel Institute for the World Economy (print and online).
- Kruse, Peter (2011). "Rien ne va plus! So let's start a New Game! – A Conversation with Thomas Sattelberger". we-magazine (print and online).
- Kruse, Peter (2011). "Soft Values, Hard Facts". Google, Think Quarterly. Archived from the original on 2013-02-05.
- Kruse, Peter (2010). "The Network Is Challenging Us (print and online)". Bertelsmann Foundation in cooperation with we-magazine.
- Kruse, Peter (2011). "Moving beyond Left, Right and Center: How Politics Grapples with the Challenge of Participation". Emotions in Politics and Campaigning. EAPC-Books.
