= Lydia Mugambi =

Ugandan artist

- Occupations: Artist; Educator; Actress

Lydia Mugambi is a Ugandan artist, actress, and educator.

== Education and career ==
Mugambi attended Gayaza High School in the 1950s and after completing the studies there she joined Makerere University's Margaret Trowell school of art. After two years at the maiden school of art in East Africa, Mugambi transitioned to the school of education at the same university to study a bachelor's degree in education in the 1960s. After completing her first degree, Mugambi started teaching fine art at Makerere University college school between 1965 and 1970. Mugambi attended Rochester Institute of Technology courtesy of a scholarship got from US-based NGO.

Upon returning from the United States, Mugambi started lecturing art at Makerere University's college of education but would also continue going to the school of art where she mentored other artists like Bruno Sserunkuuma, Lilian Mary Nabulime, Sarah Nakinsaze and others. As a practicing artist herself, Mugambi creates paintings, drawings and sculptures. Her work has been featured in several art exhibitions. Besides being in the art spaces, Mugambi is also a theatre actress and used to stage shows at Uganda's National Theatre in the capital Kampala.

== Personal life ==
Mugambi is married has 5 children.
