= Henry Mzili Mujunga =

Ugandan painter

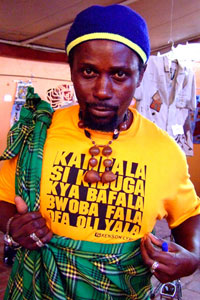
Henry 'Mzili' Mujunga

Henry "Mzili" Mujunga (born 1971), is a Ugandan-born painter, printmaker, and writer. He has been exploring intuitive ways of reviving African art through an art movement called indigenous expressionism. He strongly advocates the importance of networking amongst contemporary African artists in order to share their culture and create an interesting dialogue with the art being produced globally.

Henry ’Mzili’ Mujunga's portraits feature numerous, seemingly disparate objects brought together into a single frame. They are set in intimate spaces where highly personal interactions take place – often combining several such spaces into one – with titles that the describe the interactions within the paintings themselves, and at the same time allude to external associations. Mzili's gathering of objects, spaces, and the existing associations with these objects mimics the processes of identity-making that he observes in his native Uganda. Individuals often rely on their outward appearance, their possessions, even their environments (and their interactions within them) to communicate their own vision of themselves. At the same time these very things are looked upon by others to identify those around them. Through these information-packed autobiographical compositions, Mzili offers a glimpse into his personal history and present. In addition, they become, for the viewer, a point of departure from which to begin building an understanding of identity in present-day urban Kampala.

Mzili is a founding member of the East African Art Group Index Mashariki, which seeks to re-establish relevancy for art in the local community by propagating indigenous-expressionism. He is also a member of the Pan African Circle of Artists (PACA) that links artists working for the integration of Africa through art.

He is cofounder of Kampala Arts Trust and Online Visual arts Journal Start Journal of Arts and Culture. He is the first curator of the Kampala Art Biennale, 2014.

Mzili is a winner of the Royal Overseas League (ROSL) Art Scholarship 2003 and has exhibited in galleries in Uganda, Kenya, Tanzania, Nigeria, Togo, Benin, Burkina Faso, Mali, Ghana, the United Kingdom, Germany, France, South Africa and the Netherlands.
