= Sarah Waiswa =

Uganda-born photographer

- Born: 1980s Uganda
- Occupations: Documentary and Portrait Photographer
- Known for: 2016 Rencontres d'Arles Discovery Award

Sarah Waiswa is a documentary and portrait photographer born in Uganda and based in Nairobi, Kenya. She won the 2016 Rencontres d'Arles Discovery Award for a series that explored albino persecution in sub-Saharan Africa. She was also recognized by the 2015 Uganda Press Photo Awards.

== Early life and career ==
Sarah Waiswa was born in Uganda and is based in Nairobi, Kenya. She studied sociology and psychology, and is a self-taught photographer.

Her portraiture project, "Stranger in a Familiar Land", explores the persecution of albinos in sub-Saharan Africa, in which they are hunted for the perceived magical powers of their body parts. The series sets an albino woman against a background of the Nairobian slums of Kibera, which represent the stormy outside world. The model's dreamlike pose in societal isolation reflects both the model's alienation and the photographer's hesitance towards her society. Waiswa developed the project to raise awareness after reading a newspaper article about treatment of albinos in Tanzania. Part of their shoot consisted of responding to the jeering throng. Aida Muluneh, the photographer who presented the award, described Waiswa's photography as reflecting her surroundings' complexities. While Sarah Moroz of i-D praised the clarity with which Waiswa presented the isolation of albino identity, as the model's lighthearted accessories defied an insurmountable air of rejection, Sean O'Hagan of The Guardian considered the otherwise "brave" effort "oddly overstaged".

Waiswa's work explores what she calls a "New African Identity": how younger generations of Africans feel more expressive and less restrained by tradition than their predecessors. She also sought to counteract stereotypical depictions of Africa, often the result of foreign rather than native photographers. Additionally, many of her subjects are women.

In 2010, Sarah returned to Nairobi from United States of America, and took up photography, a career she loved for storytelling.

In 2016, Waiswa was working with photographer Joel Lukhovi on "African Cityzens", which records daily life in multiple African cities. They participated in a 2017 book that shows the Maasai people in truthful, quotidian context, rather than as stereotypical warriors. For Waiswa, the project consummated a search for information on a poorly documented ancient female deity.

== Awards ==
- 2015: Uganda Press Photo Award's top creative prize and was a runner-up in its portrait and daily life categories
- 2016: Rencontres d'Arles Discovery Award
- 2017: OkayAfrica named her among Uganda's best emerging artists
- 2021: Afro X Digital Awards Winner Photographer Of The Year
