= Kizito Maria Kasule =

Ugandan artist and entrepreneur (born 1967)

- Citizenship: Ugandan

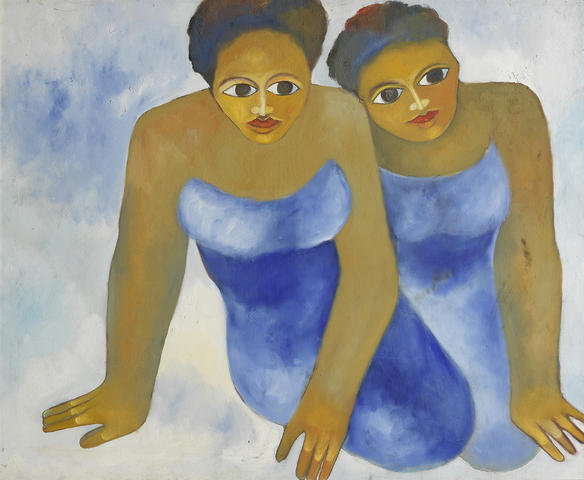

Kizito Maria Kasule (born 1967) is a Ugandan artist and entrepreneur. His work has been shown throughout East Africa, Belgium, Austria, Germany, Australia, and France, as well as in Denmark and Norway. He has been a lecturer at Makerere University since 1992.

Kasule opened the Nagenda International Academy of Art and Design (NIAAD), a school of higher education in art, in 2006.

== Early life ==
Kizito Maria was born in 1967 a rural village in Uganda. He was the youngest among 12 brothers and sisters. His parents owned a small family-run coffee plantation. At the age of 11 his father demanded that his son quit school and work in the family plantation instead. The young Kizito refused to quit his studies and in return was forced by his father to leave his home. The next few months Kizito lived as a street child, knocking on random doors and offering to work in return for food and shelter. Eventually he was picked by a local man and allowed to reside with him. The next couple of years Kizito spent studying in the morning and working in several coffee plantations at the afternoon in order to pay for his tuition and keep.

In 1987 a civil war broke out in the north of Uganda. Two years later, at the age of 16, Kizito was arrested and sent to a military camp. He labored as a grave digger for fellow prisoners who were executed. One day, after finishing digging several graves, he and his cellmates were ordered to stand at the edge of the graves in front of a firing squad. The soldiers then started executing the prisoners one-by-one, sparing only Kizito's life due to the acquaintance between his dad and one of the camp's officers, who allowed Kizito's escape. He then escaped Uganda with a fake ID. He returned three years later and attended Makerere University in Kampala. In 1992 Kizito graduated with a Bachelor of Arts degree in Art.

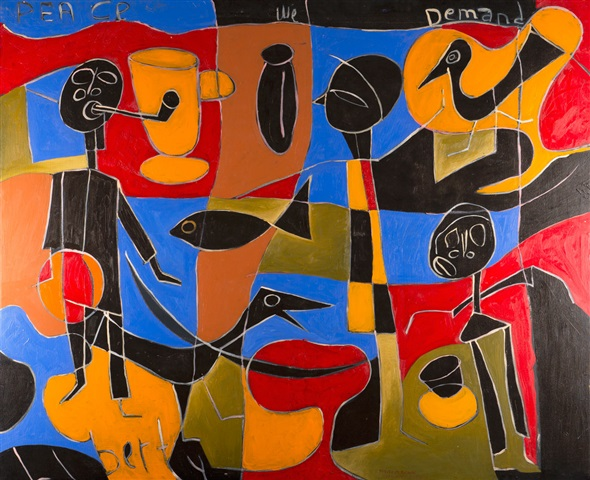

== Career ==
In 1994 he held his first solo exhibition, which received positive reviews.

In 2003 Kizito completed his PhD in art history from Makerere University and won a scholarship to Burren College of Art in Ireland.

Kizito Maria is also a philanthropist and community activist. His main community project is the art college of NIAAD which educates teens and other young Ugandans. In 2009 NIAAD joined with the Israeli non-profit organization Brit Olam to create the "Muse Uganda" project. The project houses and educates disadvantaged youth from Uganda and enables them to join the NIAAD academy as regular students at a subsidized price.

Kizito Maria Kasule is currently Dean of Fine arts at Margaret Trowell School of Art and design at Makerere university, Kampala, Uganda.

== Exhibitions ==
=== Selected solo exhibitions ===
2014 Kunst Rett Vest, Asker and Galleri Stilart, Gran, Norway

2011 Makerere University Gallery, Kampala, Uganda

2009 Makerere University Gallery, Kampala, Uganda

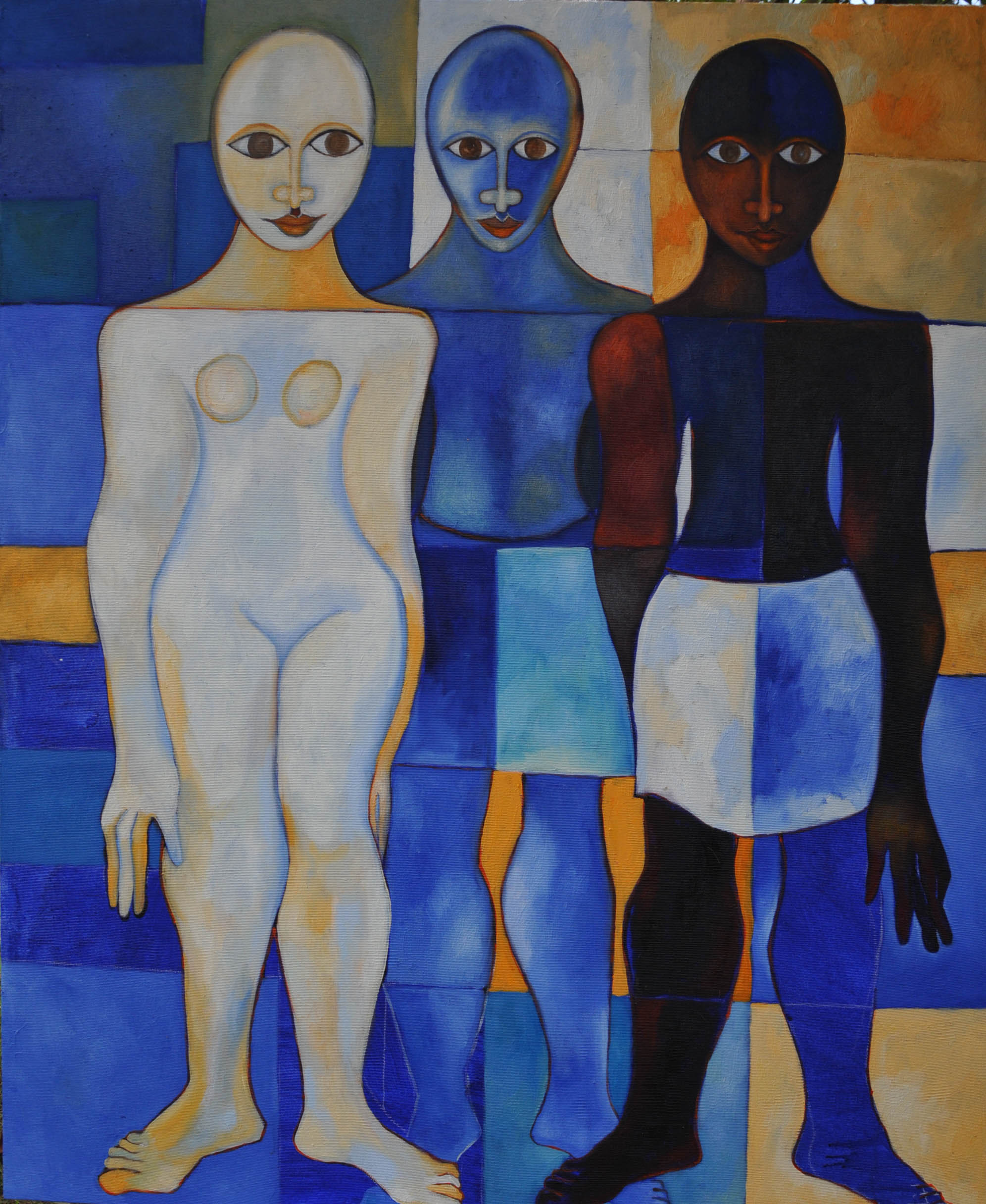

2008 La Fontaine Gallery, Kampala, Uganda

2006 Sakaraga Gallery, New York, USA

2004 Windhoek College of Art, Windhoek, Namibia

2000 National Museum of Kenya, Nairobi, Kenya

2000 Paris Gallery, New York, US

1998 German Cultural Centre, Kampala, Uganda

1998 Tulifanya Gallery, Kampala, Uganda

=== Selected group exhibitions ===
2014 Dronninglund Kunstcenter, Denmark

2012 Diani Art Gallery, Mombasa, Kenya

2008 Kultur Stationen, Skørping, Denmark

2005 Burren College of Art Gallery, Ballyvaughan, Ireland

1999 University of Namibia, Windhoek, Namibia

1995 Modern ART, Uganda Austria collaboration, Kampala, Uganda

1995 Art Space Gallery, Johannesburg, South-Africa

1994 Nommo Gallery, Kampala, Uganda

1994 Art Africa Exhibition 7th pan African Congress, Kampala, Uganda
