= Bathsheba Okwenje =

Ugandan-born Rwandan visual artist (born 1973)

- Born: 1973 (age 52–53)
- Education: Rhode Island School of Design
- Known for: Installation and photography
- Website: https://www.bathshebaokwenje.com/

Bathsheba Okwenje (born 1973) is a Ugandan visual and installation artist, who is a co-founder and member of the artist collective Radha May. She has a Masters in Fine Art from Rhode Island School of Design. Prior to concentration on her artistic career, Okwenje worked for the United Nations for fifteen years. Her work engages with themes of migration, feminism, and conflict. She uses photography as part of her installation style, as well as engaging with the intersections between archive and art.

== Selected works ==
- Kara Blackmore & Bathsheba Okwenje (2021) Repairing Representational Wounds: Artistic and Curatorial Approaches to Transition After War, Critical Arts, 35:4, 103-122
- Papa, Elisa Giardina, Nupur Mathur, and Bathsheba Okwenje. "An Interview with the Artist Radha May: A Global Collective with a Single Identity." Camera Obscura: Feminism, Culture, and Media Studies 31.3 (2016): 177-183.
