= Rose Kirumira =

Ugandan sculptor

- Born: Namubiru Rose Kirumira; October 28, 1962 (age 63)
- Known for: Sculpture

Namubiru Rose Kirumira (born 28 October 1962). is a Ugandan sculptor and senior lecturer at the Margaret Trowell School of Industrial and Fine Arts (MTSIFA), Department of Visual Arts, College of Engineering Design Art and Technology, at Makerere University. She specializes in human form, sculpted wood, clay and concrete monumental sculptures. Her works include the statue King Ronald Mwenda Mutebi where she assisted the sculptor and professor Francis Nnaggenda at Bulange Mengo, and Family at Mulago Hospital in Kampala.

== Education ==
She undertook her undergraduate and graduate studies at Makerere University where she earned a PhD. Her dissertation was titled The Formation of Contemporary Visual Arts in Africa; Revisiting Residency Programmes.

== Career ==
=== Research ===
Rose Kirumira in 2010 undertook a research project, Visual Art Skills and Activities Towards Enhancing Teaching How to Begin Reading and Writing of Early Childhood Education in Uganda at Nkumba University. She was also part of the research project/teachers manual Write a Story for the Rockefeller Foundation and the Makerere Institute of Social Research. In 2005, she took part in the research project 8 Teachers Booklets: An Approach to Teaching Beginners of Reading and Writing at Lower Primary School in Uganda, a Makerere Institute of Social Research project for the Rockefeller Foundation. 35 illustrated Children's Stories was also a 2005 research project for Makerere University/Rockefeller Foundation for 450 primary schools in Uganda that she was part of. Rose Kirumira undertook A Model for an Indigenous Ceramic Ware Cottage Industry, a 2003 research project at the Margaret Trowell school of Industrial and Fine Arts, a Makerere University/Japan AICAD project.

=== Notable exhibitions ===
- Personalities (2010), Tulifanya Art Gallery in Kampala
- Different But One, (1996-2013) at Makerere Art Gallery
- Women on the Move and Artist of the Millennium (1995-2000), Makerere Art Gallery and Nommo Gallery
- Faces (1996), Tulifanya Art Gallery
- Rise with the Sun (1995), an exhibition of women and Africa, Winnipeg, Canada

=== Notable collections ===
Rose Kirumira sculpted King Ronald Wenda Mutebi at the Buganda Parliament, and the sculpture Family at Mulago Hospital Kampala in 1994. She sculpted Mother at the UNDP headquarters. She further created a sculpture The Page in Winnipeg, Canada in 1995, Ambassador in the United States in 1999, and Omumbejja, a sculpture in Denmark, between 1997 and 2010. She sculpted Friendship in Changchun China in 2000. In 1997 she made sculptures for the Don Bosco Vocational Chapel in Kamuli District.

== Publications ==
Kirumira Namubiru authored a book chapter in An Artist's Notes on the Triangular Workshops. She also authored Identity Gender and Representation: Reflecting on the Sculpture 'Mother Uganda.' Her work Reconfiguring the Omweso Board Game: Performing Narratives of Buganda Material Culture was published in 2019.

== See also ==
- Pamela Enyonu
- Acaye Kerunen
- Afriart Gallery
