= Acaye Kerunen =

Ugandan artist (born 1981)

- Citizenship: Uganda
- Occupations: Performance artist, Writer, Actor

Acaye Kerunen Elizabeth is a Ugandan writer, poet, actress, performance artist, installation artist, and art activist. She is the founding director of KEBU forum. She was the first female Ugandan artist to exhibit under the first ever Ugandan pavilion at the 59th International Art Exhibition of Biennale di Venezia (2022).

== Early childhood and education ==
Acaye was born in Kampala, Nsambya Hospital and was raised by her parents, who were also artists. She was born after her parents return from a period of exile in Nairobi, Kenya. Acaye is the last sister of four sisters born to her mother Rose Akello. Acaye attended Kiswa primary school. She joined City High School in Kololo from 1994 to 1995, for her Olevel. She later joined Uphill College in Mbuya for continuation of her Olevel and Alevel from 1997 to 1999.

From Aptech, she graduated with a diploma in information systems management in 2002. Acaye graduated from Islamic University in Uganda (IUIU), Mbale campus with a Bachelor of science in mass communication, in 2009.

== Career ==
Acaye has held positions in many different career fields. She worked for Uganda Red Cross Society in her O-level vacation where she assisted in initiatives to encourage families to adopt protective measures that guard against outbreaks of cholera. She gained the position of Assistant Director in the Volcano Theatre production of "Goodness" in Canada in 2012. Acaye was a fitness trainer in aerobics and Tae Bo. She was also a vocal arts trainer for four years before joining IUIU.

Currently, she trains clients in dance, pilates, and yoga. She also practices trauma release therapy with clients and utilizes movement techniques. Acaye also founded KEBU forum, an alliance between artists and managers that affords them the opportunity to develop their talents and publish their work.

=== Visual artist ===
Acaye's installation work involves hand stitching, appending, knotting, embroidery and weaving using natural fibre and locally (Ugandan) sourced materials such as banana fibers, palm leaves, reeds and back cloth that are harvested, dried and woven in Uganda. Her works fall in various disciplines such as visual art, curation, activism, acting, poetry, writing, and performance.

Speaking to Art & Object magazine about the multidisciplinary quality of her art, she said, "I tell the stories as they present themselves. Whether sculptural, through a garden, or through curation. Stories have a way of choosing their carrier mediums. I try not to over interrogate what medium might work best."

Acaye has participated in various curatorial fellowships which were supported by Afriart Gallery, Makerere University in Kampala; 32 Degrees East, Newcastle University and United Kingdom.

Acaye has works which include;

- Lwang sawa (which has meanings, that is "In the eye of time" and also "You are burning" in Alur language).
- Myel (It depicts a woman in a moment of dance motion in basketry).
- Wangker ("Eyes of Reign" in Alur language).
- Kot Ubinu ("Rain is coming" in Alur language).
- Passion flower.

=== Writer and poet ===
Acaye has written poetry and also theatre musical scripts were some of them were premiered and published at Uganda National theatre and Phoenix. She also has stories that were published by the Ministry of Education in Uganda, FEMRITE Uganda.

- Acaye has written for Full woman magazine that is published by Daily monitor.
- Acaye wrote most of the music that was in her musical theatre piece that she published under the title "Dawn of the Pearl" in 2006.

=== Actor and performer ===
- Acaye performed her poetry at the Kampala art scene but she also performs at festivals, show cases and symposiums.
- Acaye performed in Silent Voice by Judith Adong
- In 2021, Acaye participated in an online self-led dance fellowship that was organised by Saisan Foundation of Japan.

== Exhibitions ==
- In 2018, Kendu an interactive womblike structure that was made from bark cloth was installed by Acaye at the Nyege Nyege Ugandan culture and music festival.
- In 2021 from 18 September to 28 October 2021, Acaye debut five week exhibition was "Lwang Sawa" (which is loosely translated as "In the eye of time" in Alur) at Afriart gallery in Kampala under a curatorial fellowship with the New Castle University.
- In 2022 from 23 April to 27 November, Acaye exhibited her weavings at the 59th International Art Exhibition of Biennale di Venezia (aka Venice Biennale Arte) at the Uganda national pavilion under the title "Radiance - They Dream in Time" after she received a partnership between Stjarna and the Uganda National Cultural Centre (UNCC).
- In 2022 in October, Acaye exhibited at the Frieze London 2022.
- In 2022, Acaye exhibited at Blum & Poe at Art Basel Miami Beach.
- In 2023, Acaye held her solo exhibition in Los Angeles.

== Awards, recognitions and publications ==
- In June 2012, Vogue Italia Magazine featured her as one of the social african activists.
- In 2022, Acaye was recognised with a special mention award at the 59th International Art Exhibition of Biennale di Venezia for her use of materials such as raffia, banana fiber, reeds and also her illustration of sustainability as a practice and not just a policy or concept.

== See also ==
- Afriart Gallery
- Simon Njami
- Sungi Mlengeya
- Nommo gallery, Uganda Museum
