= Catherine Apalat =

Ugandan journalist (born 1981)

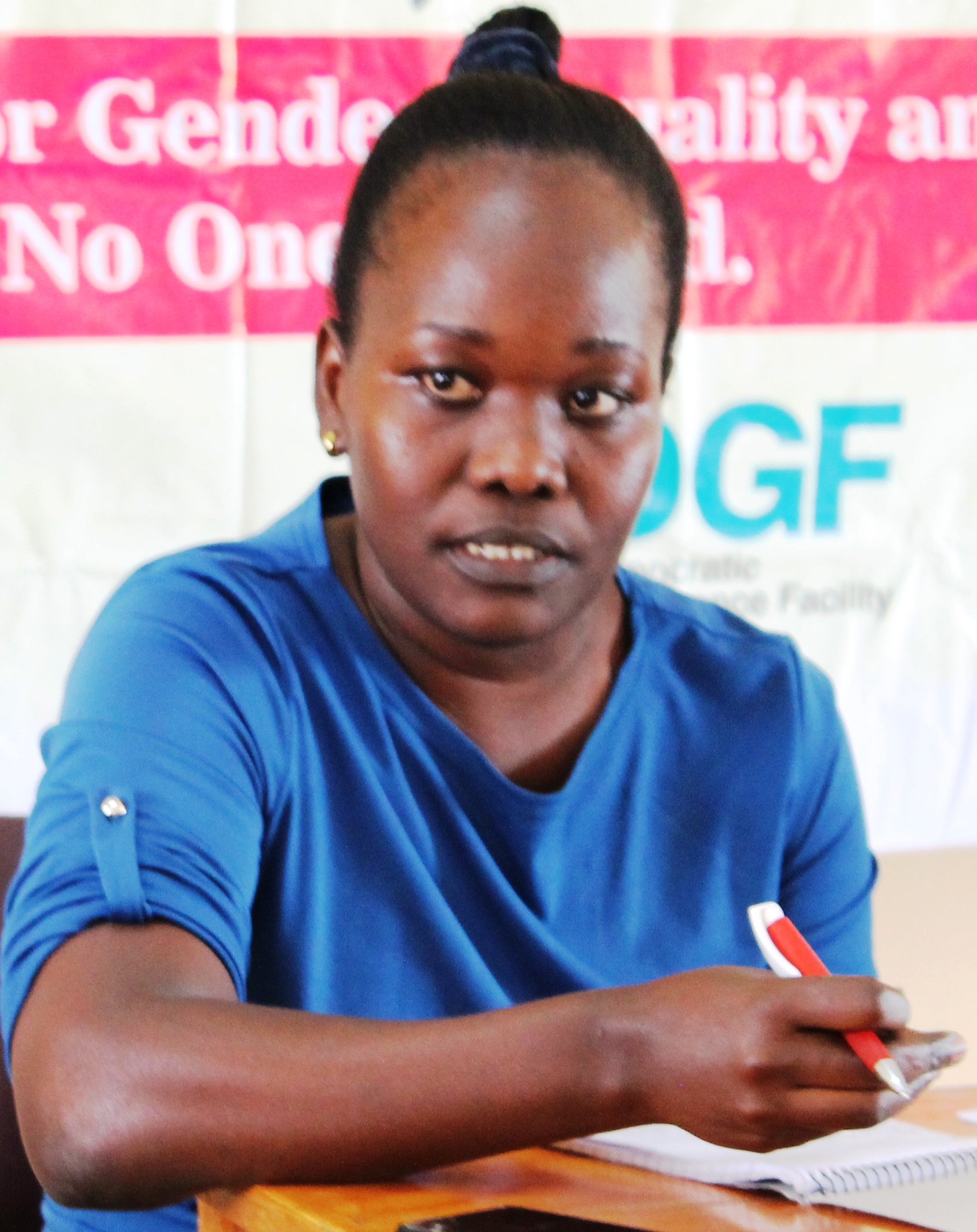
- Apalat in 2018
- Born: 28 August 1981 (age 45); Tororo, Uganda
- Education: Makerere University (Bachelor's degree in Mass Communication)
- Occupations: Journalist, blogger, filmmaker and photographer
- Parents: David Livingstone Ongadi (father); Grace Onyadi (mother)

Catherine Apalat (born 28 August 1981) is a Ugandan journalist, blogger, filmmaker and still photographer at Uganda Media Women's Association (UMWA). As of April 2013, Apalat is the Programs Manager of Mama FM, a community radio station under UMWA.

== Background and education ==
Apalat was born in Tororo to David Livingstone Ongadi, a primary school teacher, and Grace Onyadi, a communications specialist. Apalat attended Rock View primary school in 1994, before joining Tororo Girls and Our Lady of Gayaza for her secondary schooling (1995–2000). Apalat enrolled at Makerere University and graduated with a bachelor's degree in Mass Communication in 2005.

== Career ==
Apalat worked with Makerere University Mass Communication Film Department in 2002. She produced 10-minute drama skits entitled "Salongo’s Gift" and "Portrait of an artist". Apalat joined Top Radio and worked with the News Production Department, producing news, editing and specialized in crime reporting in 2003. From 2005 to 2006, she worked as a script writer and continuity film crew with the Great Lakes Film Production.

Since 2007, Apalat has also worked as a producer and photographer for still photography with Uganda Media Women's Association Newspaper pull-out (The Other Voice) and Grass Root Women Empowerment Network (GWEN) Magazine among others. Apalat worked as an Fredskorpset (FK) Exchange Participant (Norwegian Peace Corp) with College of Journalism and Mass Communication (CJMC FM) in 2011, Nepal. The Nepali Ministry of Communication, Nepal recognized Apalat's contribution in showcasing the different African traditions and culture through films in the first ever Nepal Africa film festival in May 2011.

As of April 2013, Apalat is the Program's Director Mama Fm, a Community Radio Station in Uganda. Apalat worked with radio staff to ensure that radio's mission is adhered to, producing gender-focused programs, spot messages and drama skits.

== Research ==
Apalat has participated in a number of research projects including “Grass roots Women in Technology in 2013, Audience analysis for Mama FM listeners in 2014 and The Global Media Monitoring Project (GMMP) in 2015 with Uganda Media Women's Association.
