= Leilah Babirye =

Ugandan artist and LGBT activist

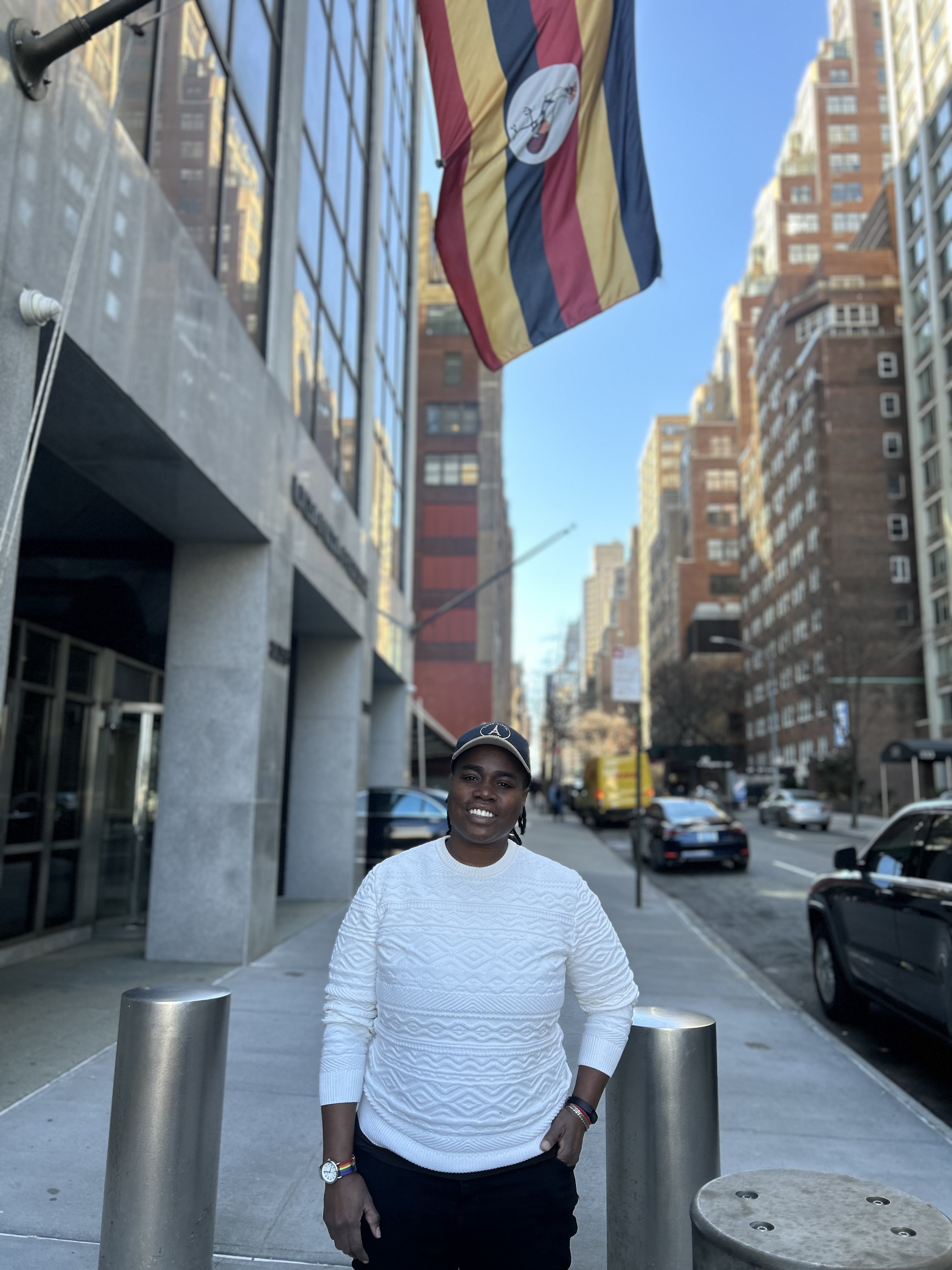
- Born: Kampala, Uganda
- Education: Makerere University

Leilah Babirye is a Ugandan artist living and working in Bushwick, Brooklyn, New York City. Outed in her native country as a lesbian and underground LGBTQ+ activist, Babirye's work is of large-scale ceramics, wooden sculptures, African masks, as well as drawings and paintings on paper. Babirye has had exhibitions at the Gordon Robichaux Gallery and the Socrates Sculpture Park in New York, as well as the Stephen Friedman Gallery in London. She has also produced work for Heidi Slimane for Celine's Art Project.

== Biography ==
Babirye was born and raised in Kampala, where she attended Makerere University from 2007 to 2010 where she studied art. Babirye is a lesbian. Her sexual orientation caused her to face discrimination and public humiliation as it is considered illegal to be openly homosexual in Uganda.

In 2015, Babirye was publicly outed in Uganda's press, was denied supervision from her tutors during her Master's at Makerere University due to her sexuality, and was disowned from her family. These events led Babirye to apply to artist residencies in the United Kingdom, Sweden, and the United States, the latter accepting her application for a residency in Fire Island, a popular gay destination in New York's Long Island.

In 2018, Babirye applied for and received asylum in the United States with aid from the African Services Committee, the New York City Anti-Violence Project, and the African Human Rights Coalition who specialize in representing LGBTQIA+ refugees. After her residency at Fire Island, Babirye was connected with Sam Gordon, the owner of Gordon Robichaux gallery. Gordon was interested in Babirye's work and wanted to exhibit her art at his gallery, however, Babirye had only been drawing and painting so Gordon gave her his backyard as a space for her to work.

== Major works ==
=== Gallery ===
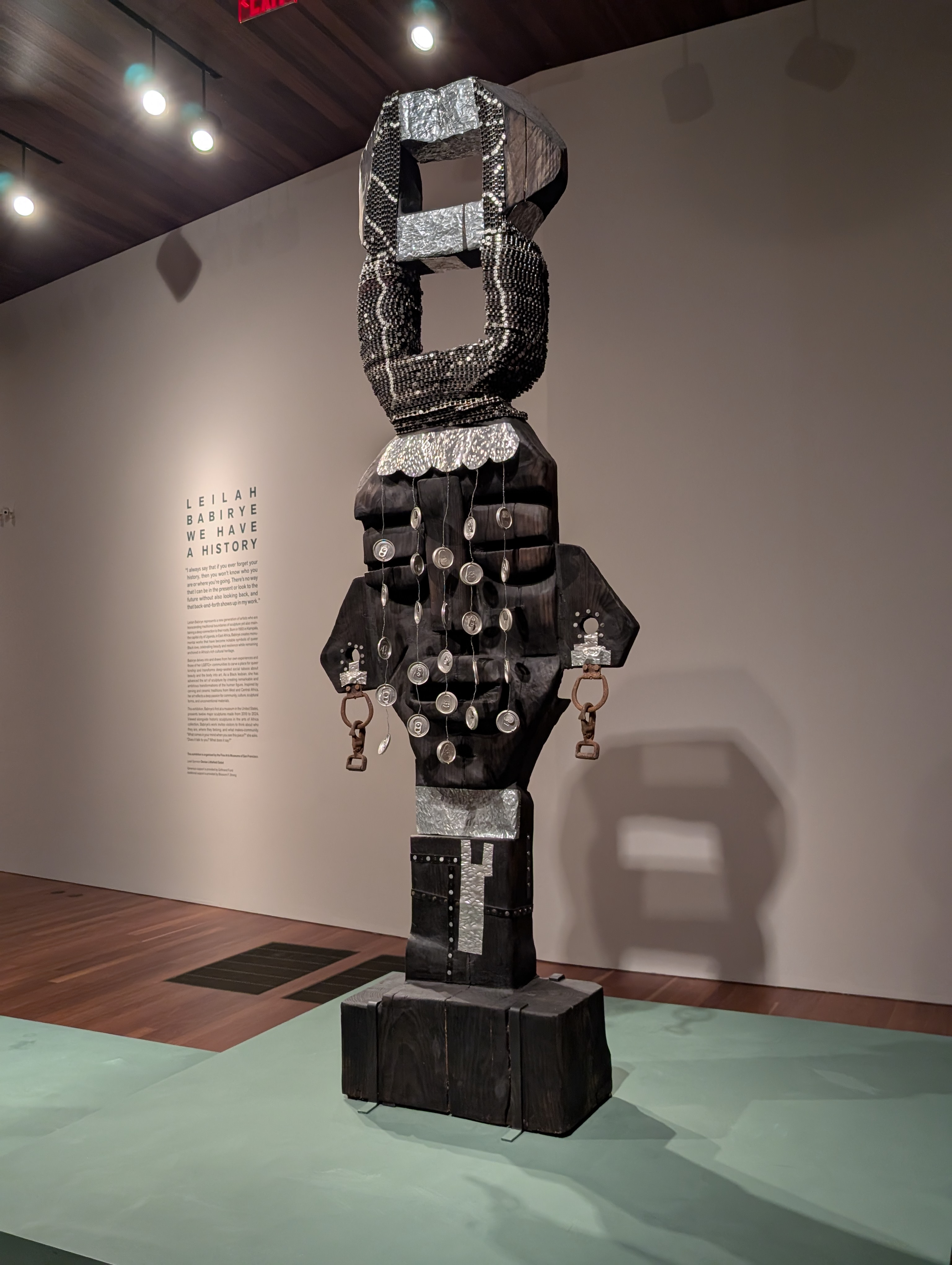
Omugole Omukyala Namirembe Kaddulubale (Peaceful Bride of Mwanga II), 2020, displayed at de Young Museum, San Francisco in 2025

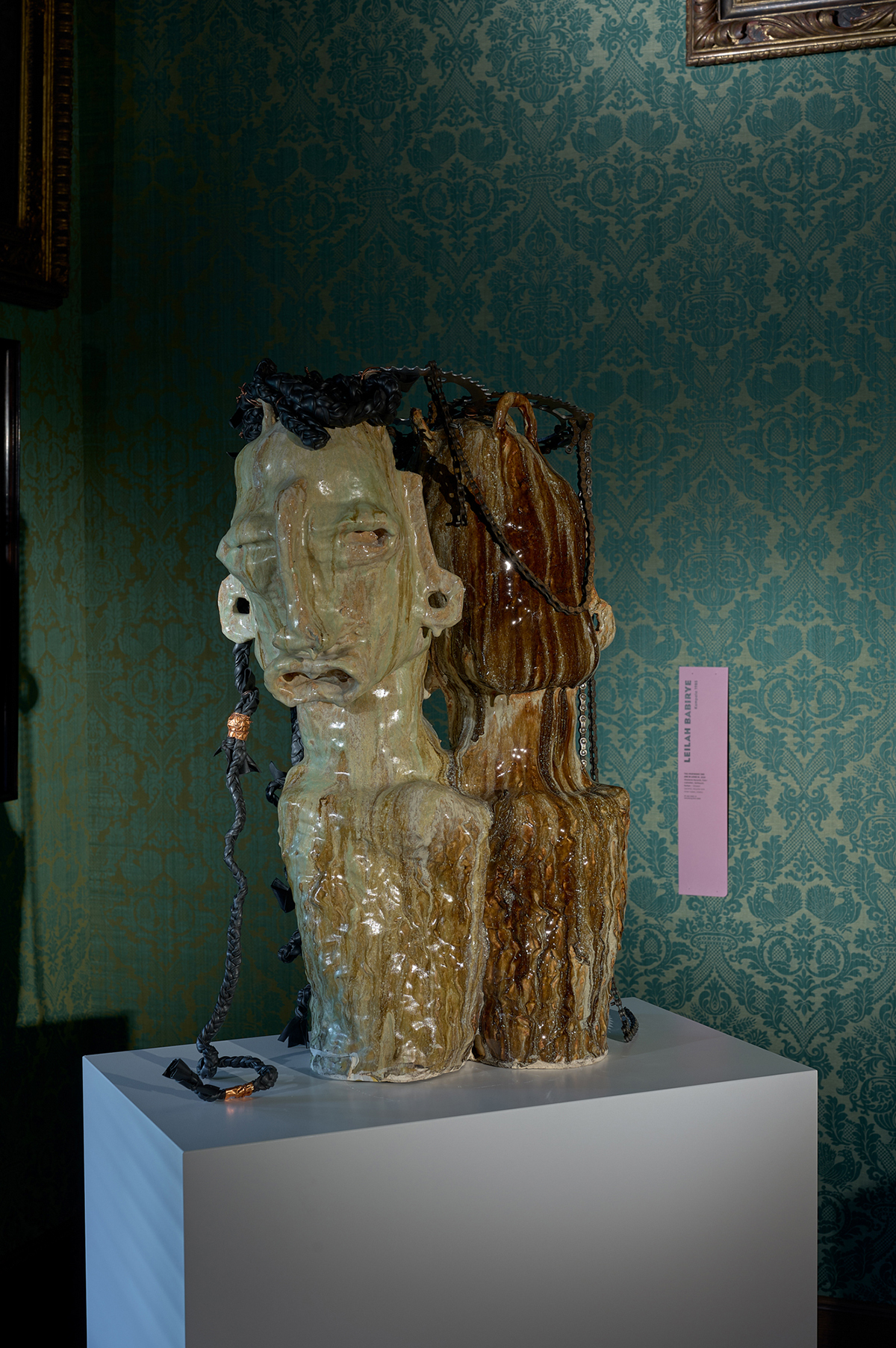
Tuli Mukwano (We Are in Love) IV, 2025, displayed at Lenbachhaus, Munich

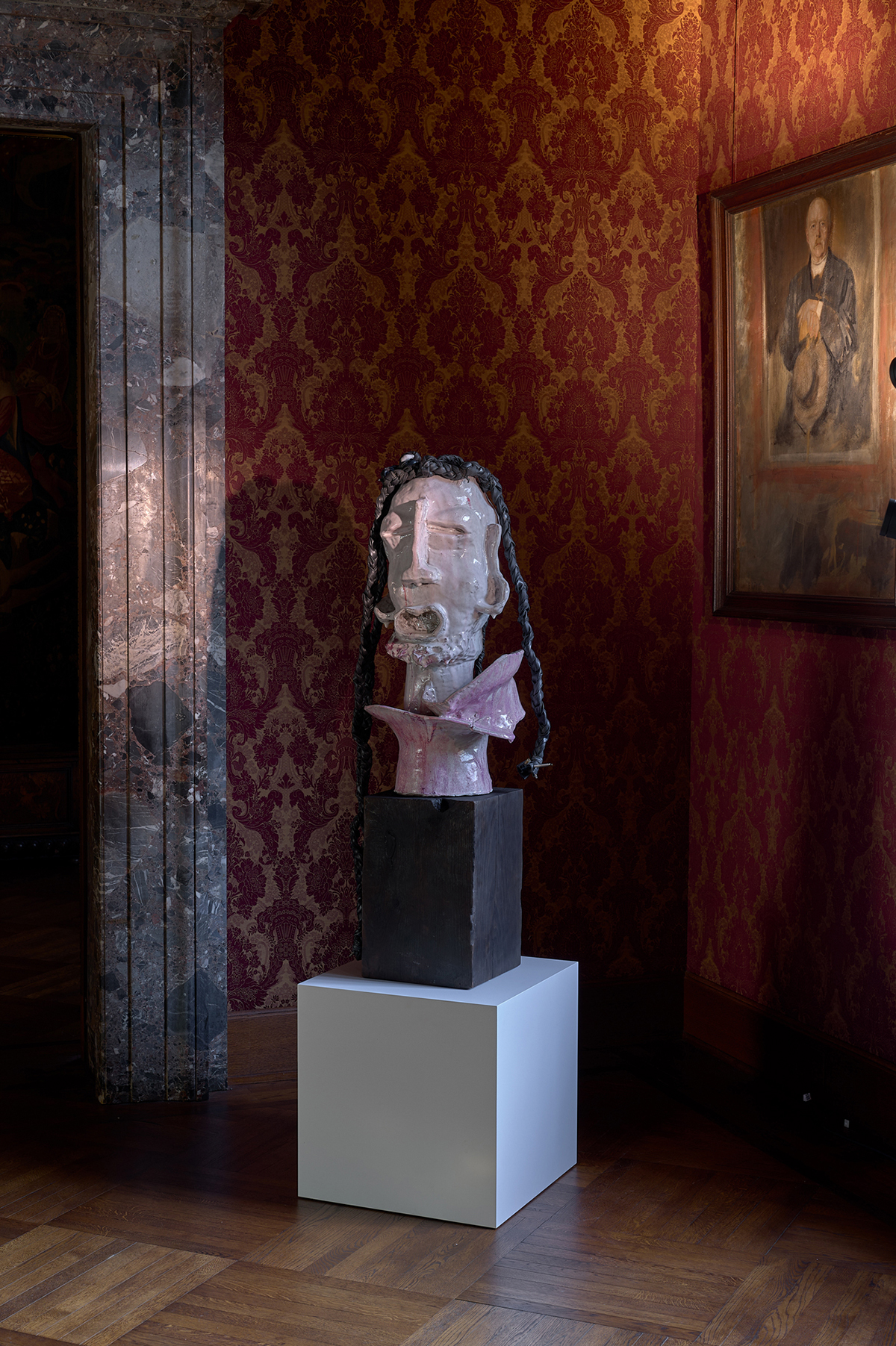
Ssemakadde from the Kuchu Njovu (Elephant) Clan, 2025, displayed at Lenbachhaus, Munich

=== Najunga From the Kuchu Ngaali (Crested Crane) Clan, 2021 ===
Babirye utilizes wood, ceramic, metal and found materials and often represents African masks, influenced by her culture and sexuality. Named after a Ugandan clan, Babirye evokes the history of her culture through the clan names given to the people of Uganda. The totem-inspired piece explores identity, and how the queer community continues to exist and hold their clan names despite being disowned or unaccepted for who they are. Commissioned by Hedi Slimane for Celine's Art Project, and based on a given reference, Babirye took on new challenges for this made-to-order sculpture. While being the first deadline piece Babirye has worked on, her process changed very little, still composing meaning and form as she went. Although, ultimately, her work is open to interpretation and communication, specifically through the emotion of the faces and masks Babirye creates.

=== Nansamba II from the Kuchu Ngabi (Antelope) Clan, 2021 ===
Babirye's sculpture titled Nansamba II from the Kuchu Ngabi (Antelope) Clan is another multimedia large-scale work. The ceramic face is erected from tubes of a bicycle tire, hardware, and glazing, as a commentary on the name given to a gay person in Luganda, ‘ebisiyaga’, meaning rubbish. Babirye often works with found materials, demonstrating that something believed to be waste, still has a use and is valuable. Alongside Nansamba II, Babirye's series includes Nakawaddwa from the Kuchu Ngabu (Antelope) Clan, 2021, and Abambowa (Royal Guard Who Protects the King), 2021, all which are intentionally ambiguous, and with no assigned gender to her any of her faces. Babirye aspires to represent her community of queer people, and the male clan names imparted on her works take on further significance when they depict commonly female-associated attributes namely hair, jewelry or lipstick.

=== Abambowa (Royal Guard Who Protects the King), 2021 ===
Babirye's ceramic series of twenty-two heads exemplifies the King's Royal Guard. The figures are splattered or dripped with ceramic glazes, playing with techniques of the medium and aiming to ultimately imagine a new society, and encourage the evaluation of traditional values and systems of British Colonialism in Uganda. The roughly formed unique figures once again integrates Babirye's cultural heritage and sexuality into her work with the intent of referencing the figures as both members of the royal guard, as well as her queer community.

=== Nakawaddwa from the Kuchu Ngabi (Antelope) Clan, 2021 ===
Another example of Babirye's interest in the amalgamation of her heritage and sexuality as a form of LGBTQIA activism is apparent in Nakawaddwa from the Kuchu Ngabi (Antelope) Clan. Babirye herself comes from the Antelope Clan of Uganda, and this ceramic head with an elaborate crown demonstrates the pride of Babirye and Ugandan people. Babirye again uses discarded materials paired with the abstract, glazed ceramics head. The title of this work is significant not only due to the clan name, but also in the term ‘kuchu’ meaning a ‘secret word’ that those in the queer community of Uganda refer to each other by.

== Themes ==
=== Buganda Kingdom ===
The Buganda Kingdom is divided into clans, all of which have their own leaders, totems, and names, where everyone is given a clan name at birth. There are a total of 52 clans, with each having hundreds of family names. These family names are derived from animals or plants, with Babirye coming from the antelope clan for example. People who identify as a part of the LGBTQIA+ community are looked down on by their families, and will often not live up to the expectations of their family name. Babirye uses these names as the titles for her pieces, a reclamation of her Ugandan identity in relationship with her queer identity. Babirye states, “Both the space and the titles are important to me because the work is basically a reflection on where I come from in the Buganda Kingdom and on creating a queer community”.

=== Found Material and LGBTQIA+ Reclamation ===
Babirye's use of found or “trash” materials within her artwork is symbolic of how the LGBTQIA+ community is viewed in Uganda, “Reusing materials is important to me, as a person who comes from a background where the LGBTQ community is looked at as trash still today”. Babirye sources wood from local lumber yards and other found materials from a scrapyard in Brooklyn. By crafting works from these discarded materials, Babirye assigns new value to them. This act also calls to a Lugandan term–ebisyaga—a derogatory term for a gay person meaning the husk of sugarcane, “It's rubbish... the part of the sugarcane you throw out”.

=== Ugandan and Bugandan Kingdom’s History ===
For her exhibition at the Stephen Friedman Gallery in London, Babirye titled the larger sculptures after the queen mothers of the Bugandan royal family. These titles recall the lineage and history of the Bugandan royal family, a history of which was evidently queer. For example, King Mwonga II was said to be an openly bisexual king, and young boys were trained or groomed to be servants for the king and given names by their service accordingly. “This went on for centuries, and it wasn't until very recently in our history that being gay was a problem”.

=== British Colonization ===
Babirye's work references Britain's colonization of Uganda in 1894. Before Britain colonized Uganda, same-sex relationships and sexual activity was met with indifference. However, with British colonization brought Victorian Christianity, and thus, homophobic views and laws. Babirye's masks alludes both to the LGBTQIA+ community who have to hide their identity out of fear of Uganda's hostile society. While these masks are not traditionally seen or created in Uganda (as they are a prominently West African thing), they still provide a perspective for what it means to be queer in Uganda, “You’re always running, trying to be safe”.

== Exhibitions ==
Since being granted asylum in the US in 2018, Babirye has secured multiple solo exhibitions in New York and internationally, presenting her large scale sculptures, ceramics, and paintings. Shortly after, in 2018, her first debut in a solo exhibition took place at Gordon Robichaux Gallery, New York, and was titled Amatwaale Ga Ssekabaka Mwanga II (The Empire of the King Mwanga II). Born and raised in Uganda, her culture has influence in the representation of King Mwanga's kingdom through wood and ceramic masks, in homage to the openly bisexual King.

Also in 2018, Babirye showcased her work in Socrates Sculpture Park, New York, an organization for artists’ creation and production of work in the park. Babirye, along with over 1000 other artists, have displayed their work on the waterfront and with access to financial support and materials, it is an excellent opportunity for artists and the community.

Babirye's next prominent exhibition was back at Gordon Robichaux Gallery in 2020. She exhibited Ebika Bya ba Kuchu mu Buganda (Kuchu Clans of Buganda), her second solo exhibition at the gallery, which featured her sculpted faces made of ceramics, wood, metal, and found objects, to take place of and represent transgender women, and an overall queer community. In Babirye's work, she explores the potential of found objects, or materials considered garbage, to reflect on the term ‘ebisiyaga’ which refers to the gay people of Uganda, another word for rubbish.

In 2024, Babirye exhibited as part of the Venice Biennale and had her first solo show titled, "Leilah Babirye: We Have a History" in the United States at San Francisco's De Young Museum.
