= Margaret Trowell =

British artist and academic (1904–1985)

- Born: Kathleen Margaret Sifton; 1904; London, England
- Died: 5 April 1985 (aged 80–81)
- Education: St. Paul's Girls' School, London; Slade School of Art; Institute of Education, University of London
- Known for: Education; Art education Art research Sculpture
- Spouse: Hubert Carey Trowell

Margaret Trowell (née Kathleen Margaret Sifton; 1904 – 5 April 1985) was a British artist, author and curator who is credited with founding the Margaret Trowell School of Industrial and Fine Art (MTSIFA) in 1937 at the then Makerere College in the then Uganda Protectorate.

She was also an artist and educator at her School of Arts in the 1930s. She was a curator for the National Museums of Uganda and as an administrator, she served as the president of the Uganda Society between 1946 and 1947.

As an educator, she advocated for creativity in art education in Uganda by designing a curriculum that focused on both contemporary art and African art styles.

== Background and education ==
Margaret Trowell was born in London in 1904. She attended primary school at St. Paul's Girls’ School, London. She later joined the Slade School of Fine Art and then the Institute of Education at the University of London in 1926 to study art education.

While at the institute, she met and trained under Marion Richardson, who "trained her to appreciate non-Western cultures".

== Career ==
During her stay in Machakos, Kenya, Trowell carried out research on art and the artistic ability of the Kamba people which led to writing her first book, African Arts and Crafts, published in 1937. As an advocate for formal art education, Trowell promoted the establishment of the School of Art at Makerere University in 1937.

To support her vision for the arts and local participation in art, she alongside Mary Fisher and the African Art society curated and organised The Synod Exhibition (also called the Namirembe Exhibition) between 29 and 30 July 1938. This was meant to be an exhibition of her students' artworks as well as showcasing artefacts from East, Central and West Africa. Baskets, mats, masks, sculptures, and paintings and was celebrated as the "first exhibition of African art" in Uganda.

Funded by the colonial administration in 1939, the exhibition subsequently toured London where it was hosted at the Imperial Institute South Kensington, as the "Exhibition of Ugandan Arts and Crafts".

=== Museum curator ===
Because of a financial crisis within the colonial administration, a number of ethnological objects were neglected and the collection of the Protectorate Museum was damaged. In 1942, the collection was relocated to the Margaret Trowell School of Fine Art and Trowell then served as the honorary curator until 1945.

While the collection was still housed at the Margaret Trowell School of Fine Art, she along with Klaus Wachsmann, supervised the collection of information and published a catalogue – Tribal Crafts of Uganda – that listed the materials in the ethnological collection.

Within the museum, she also gave lectures focusing on traditional themes such as arts and craftsmanship.

== Personal life ==
Trowell (née Sifton) was married to Hubert Carey Trowell, a physician. His appointment to the Colonial Medical Service prompted the move of the couple to Kenya in 1929 and later to Uganda upon transfer in 1935.

== Publications ==
- African arts and Crafts, their development in the school (1937).
- Tribal Crafts of Uganda (1953)
- Classical African Sculpture (1964)
- African Design (1965)
- African and Oceanic Art (1968)

== See also ==
- Rose Kirumira
- Uganda Museum
- The Uganda Society
- The Uganda Journal
- Marion Richardson
- Hubert Carey Trowell
