= Lillian Mary Nabulime =

Lilian Mary Nabulime
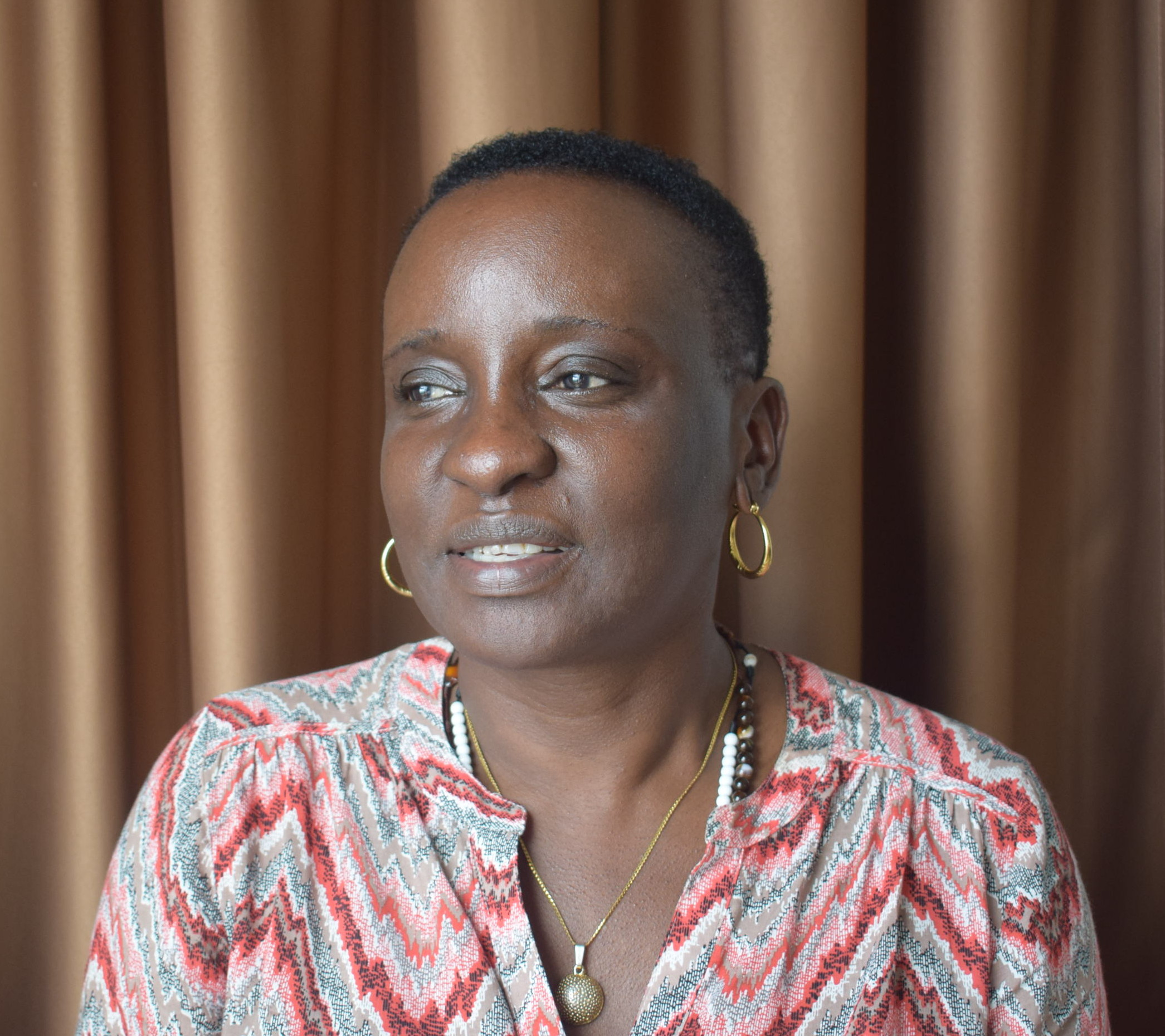
- Lilian Mary Nabulime in 2018
- Born: December 22, 1963 (age 62); Kampala district, Uganda
- Education: Makerere College School; Makerere University; Newcastle University (PhD)
- Occupations: Sculptor, lecturer

Lilian Mary Nabulime (born 22 December 1963) is a Ugandan born sculptor and senior lecturer of fine art. She is a lecturer at the College of Engineering, Design, Art and Technology (CEDAT) and has published and exhibited her works in various exhibitions both national and international.

== Biography ==
Nabulime was born in Kampala district, central region of Uganda, in 1963 and studied at Nkoni Girls' Primary school where she obtained her PLE certificate. She then went to Makerere College School for both her O levels and A levels. She obtained her bachelor's degree in fine art at Makerere University in 1987. She obtained her master's degree at Makerere University and her PhD at Newcastle University in 2007. This research was on The role of sculptural forms as a communication tool in relation to the lives and experiences of women with HIV/AIDS in Uganda.

== Career ==
Nabulime is the Senior Lecturer and former Head of the Sculpture Department in the School of Industrial and Fine Arts, College of Engineering, Design, Art and Technology (CEDAT), Makerere University. Her work uses ordinary objects (for example, soap, sieves, cloth, mirrors, metal cans, car parts and found objects) to embody a specific social agenda, such as disease, gender, and environmental issues that attempt to raise awareness and promote discussion as well as moving the meaning of art beyond the visual.

== Awards and fellowships ==
- Commonwealth Fellowship Award UK (2012)
- Robert Sterling Fellowship, Vermont Studio Center, USA (2011)
- African Stones Talk Sculpture Symposium (AST), Kenya (2011);
- British Academy International Visiting Fellowship 2009;
- ROLS UK (2009 and 2008) and; Commonwealth Fellowship Award, UK (1997).

== See also ==
- Lydia Mugambi
