= Theresa Musoke =

Painter and visual artist (born 1945)

Theresa Musoke (born 1945 in Kampala, Uganda) is a Ugandan-Kenyan painter and visual artist most well known for her experimentational and expressive depictions of Kenyan wildlife and women's experiences in African. She is most widely known for her work in painting and printmaking, but also uses batik, barkcloth, acrylic, and dye, among other materials in her works, even venturing to sculpture on occasion. Musoke describes her works as "semi-abstract" and incorporates themes such as her multinational heritage, African identity as a whole, and feminist themes including domestic roles, motherhood and family planning into her pieces. Musoke's art reflects the turbulent political crisis in which she grew up, representing a diverse mix of systems, media, and styles, both traditional and contemporary, in addition to "decades of change from self-taught traditions to Western art school training, emerging as an art form that celebrates a rich historical and cultural heritage that cannot be understood solely in terms of elements and principles of art and design".

== Education ==
Musoke attended Makerere University in Kampala, where she acquired a bachelor's degree in Arts. A year after graduating, she won a commonwealth scholarship to pursue a postgraduate diploma in Printmaking at Royal College of Art in London. She holds a master's degree in Fine Art from the University of Pennsylvania where she developed skills in textile technique of painting and tie and dye.

In 1960, Musoke was one of five qualifiers to be admitted into the Margaret Trowell School of Fine Arts, which allowed her to later transition into Makerere University's arts program. After being one of the first female graduates from Makerere University, she continued her post-graduate studies in the Makerere University Department of Education and the Graduate School of Fine Art and Architecture at the University of Pennsylvania.

== Career ==
She is better known in Kenya than in Uganda because she lived in Kenya for over two decades after she fled from Uganda due to the political situation and civil war in the country. During her schooling days at Makerere University, her works gained remarkable attention and she was commissioned to create the Birth mural. Her art work still exists at Mary Stuart Hall, one of the women's halls of residence at Makerere University. She has worked as a teacher in Kenya and Uganda. She taught art at Makerere University, Kenyatta University College, the International School of Kenya and Kestrol Manor. She has exhibited her work in Kenya, Uganda and abroad, particularly in the US, United Kingdom, and Scandinavian countries.

== Awards and recognition ==
- Margaret Trowell Painting Prize (1965)
- Post-graduate scholarship to attend the Royal College of Art in London (1966–1968)
- Rockefeller Foundation Fellowship recipient

== Works and exhibits ==
- "Cat Ghosts" 1960s, oil on board, 75" x 48.8"cm
- "Brown Giraffes" 1982, mixed media, 24" x 36"
- "Zebras" 1983, mixed media, 30" x 36"
- "Family Planning: Children With Dolls" 1985, mixed media, 30" x 36"
- "Family Planning: Young Adults" 1986, mixed media, 30" x 36"
- "Market Woman Selling Baskets", 1986, mixed media
- "Women Selling Cloth", 1987, mixed media, 30" x 48"
- "Murchison Falls"
- "Birth" mural at Mary Stuart Hall at Makerere University in Uganda
- Exhibit at the Royal Academy of Art in London, England
- Exhibit at The Hampton Institute in Virginia, USA
- Exhibit at Paa ya Paa Gallery in Kenya
- Exhibit at the Gallery of Contemporary East African Art in Nairobi, Kenya
