= Afriart Gallery =

Art gallery in Uganda

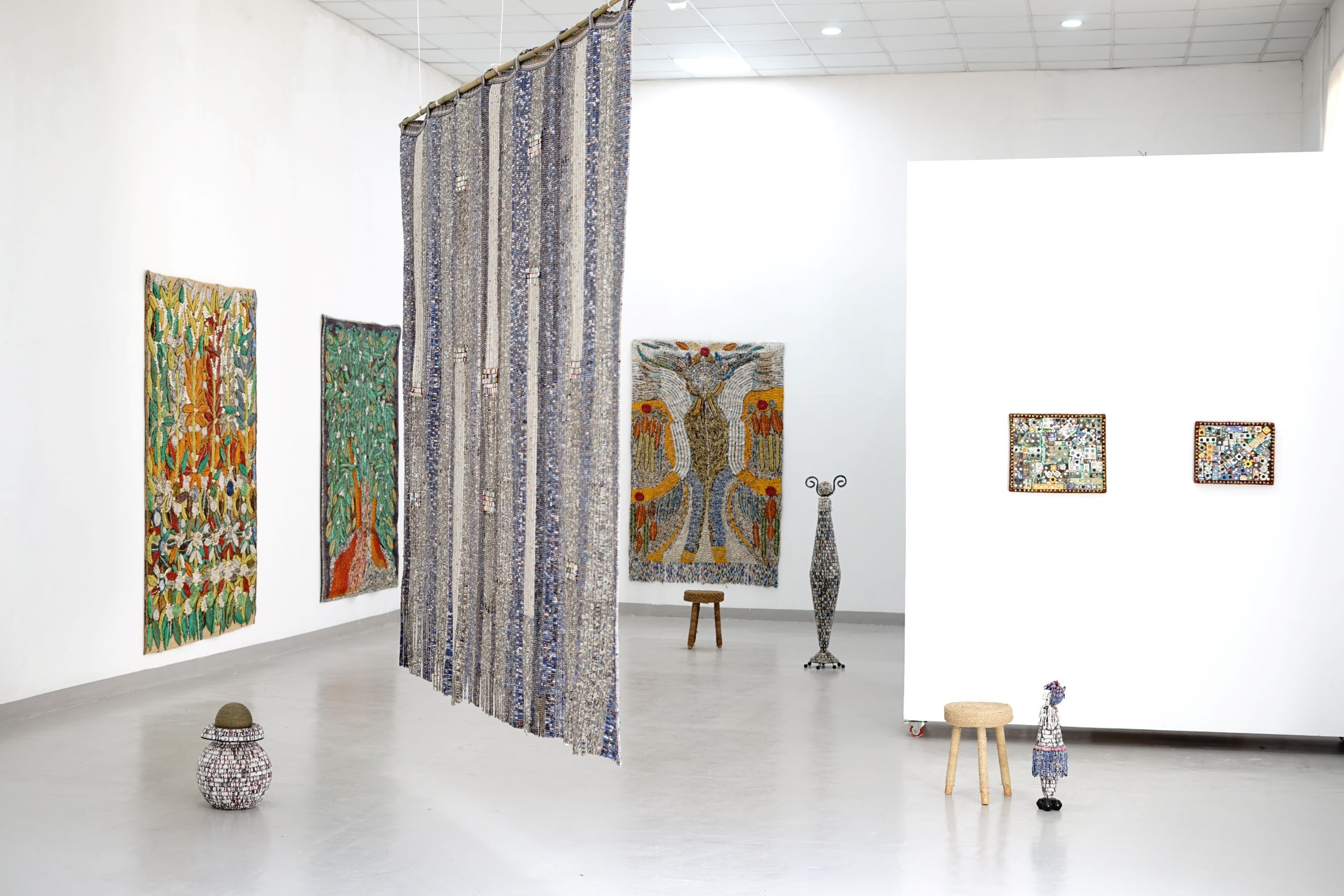
- Radical Care by Sanaa Gateja at Afriart Gallery in 2022
- Interactive map of Afriart Gallery
- Address: 110-112 Seventh Street
- Location: Kampala
- Coordinates: 0°18′48″N 32°36′32″E
- Type: Art Gallery

Construction
- Opened: 2002
- Expanded: 2015

Website
- afriartgallery.org

The Afriart Gallery (AAG) is an art gallery located on the 7th Street Industrial Area in Kampala in Uganda that was established in 2002. It represents and manages careers of contemporary artists living and working on the African continent. AAG showcases artists at major international art exhibitions and art fairs. There is a gallery space exhibiting temporary exhibitions on ground. It is where the launch for the Artfest magazine happened.

== History ==
Afriart Gallery (AAG) was founded in November 2002 by Daudi Karungi Afriart Gallery was opened at Uganda Manufacturers Association (UMA) show grounds in Lugogo. Its first solo exhibition was Paul Ndema on 4 April 2003. In 2009, AAG was moved to its second location on Kenneth dale drive in Kamwokya. In 2017, AAG moved to its third location in the industrial area of Kampala in a ware house that covers 300 square meteres by 6 metres high.

Afriart Gallery participated and also showcased in international art exhibitions and fairs such as Art X Lagos from 1 to 2 November 2019, Art Paris 2023 from 30 March 2023 to 2 April 2023, 1-54 Contemporary African Art Fair London and New York, ARCOlisboa, Art Basel in Miami Beach, and Joburg Art Fair 2016.

== Collections ==
AAG's art collection covers different disciplines such as;

- Abstract art: Works for Karungi were exhibited
- Photography: AAG exhibited the works of late Deo Kyakulagira (died 2000) under the exhibition that was named "Ebifaananyi".
- Contemporary art: such as works of Sungi Mlengeya

== Artists represented by AAG ==
AAG represents the careers of the following artists: Sanaa Gateja, Sungi Mlengeya, Henry Mzil' Mujunga, Richard Atugonza, Charlene Komuntale, Mona Taha, Emmie Nume, April Kamunde, Kaleab Abate.

== Artists affiliated to AAG ==
AAG has worked with several artists including Stacey Gillian Abe, Pamela Acaye, Collin Sekajugo, Abushariaa Ahmed, Ethel Aanyu, Wasswa Donald a.k.a. WASWAD, Edison Mugalu, Eria Nsubuga 'Sane', Xenson, Ronex Ahimbisibwe, Hood Jjuuko, Enoch Mukiibi, Ismael Kateregga, Joshua Ipoot, Kigozi, Dr George Kyeyune, Fred Mutebi, Amna Elhassan, Khalid Abdel Rahman, Amani Azhari, Nelsa Guambe, Boniface Maina, Lemek Sompoika, Elisa Mung’ora, Paul Onditi, Peterson Kamwathi, Florence Wangui, Onyis Martin.

== Projects ==
=== Silhouette Projects - Artist in Residence Programme (SP-AIR) ===
This is a three months Artist-in-residence program that AAG operates. It takes on selected talented African artists and supports them through mentorship programs, professional growth, artists' networking opportunities and also help them to show case their work at international art shows, fairs, exhibitions and biennales. Artists work in different disciplines such as painting, drawing, installation art, sculpture, performance art, among others.

Past artists of SP-AIR include;

- 2023: Daniel Atenyi, Amani Azhari, Fiker Solomon.
- 2022: Kaleab Abate, April Kamunde.
- 2021: Emmie Nume, Vitus Wasswa, Charlene Komuntale.
- 2020: Erinah Fridah, Victoria Nabulime, Odur Ronald, Richard Atugonza.

=== Vivid Synergies! ===
This is a project of Afriart gallery that is supported a grant by the Ignite Culture Fund: ACP-EU Culture Programme Eastern Africa starting from May 2023 to May 2024. It is a non stay-in residence that connects visual artists in East Africa that are based in Uganda who work on contemporary art storytelling with writers and curators for a period of four months. The artists can create their own schedule and meet and create from wherever they are. This program helps African artist to document, tell, share, publish and archive their art work in a self-determined way.

=== Kampala Art Biennale (KAB) ===
The Kampala Art Biennale (KAB) was founded by Daudi Karungi of Afriart Gallery and it was established by Kampala Arts Trust in 2014. It happens every two years showcasing Contemporary art from African countries. KAB 2014 made Uganda the first country to host an art biennale.

- KAB 2014 | The theme was "Progressive Africa". It happened from 31 August 2014, KAB 14 called on African painters, photographers, illustrators, cartoonists, writers and all 2D media artists who presented their perception of the status of Africa through visual art. KAB 2014 exhibition Venues were Nommo gallery, Uganda Museum, Makerere Art Gallery, Afriart Gallery, Alliance Francaise, National Theatre and Kampala Railway Station.
- KAB 2016 | It happened from 3 September 2016 to 2 October 2016 under theme "Seven Hills". KAB 2016's strategy was to associate all the local cultural operators in an artistic project built around an open, mutual exchange. KAB 2016 introduced The Art Education Programme.
- KAB 2018 | The theme was "The Studio". KAB18 took on a master / apprentice format to transmit knowledge and artistic skill from international contemporary art masters to young Ugandan, East African and African artists. 2018 edition was curated by Simon Njami.
- KAB 2020 | The theme was "Get Up Stand Up". It opened on the 28 October 2020. Due to COVID-19 pandemic, KAB20 was virtual edition and it followed the KAB18 Master - apprentice model, artists globally were tutored and mentored by art master virtually.

== Temporary exhibitions ==
AAG has hosted and organised many exhibitions in its galleries and these include;

- Shapes of Water Group Exhibition | May 27, 2023 - August 12, 2023
- When Thoughts Attack Me Emmie Nume | February 11, 2023 – April 15, 2023
- Walking the Edge Group Exhibition | November 26, 2022 - January 28, 2023
- Don't Try, Don't Not Try Sungi Mlengeya (B.LA Art Foundation, Vienna, Austria) | September 20, 2022 - September 28, 2022
- Kaddugalamukatale | Samson Ssenkaaba (a.k.a. Xenson)| 20 August 2022 - 28 October 2022
- (UN)CHOREOGRAPHED by Sungi Mlengeya (The Africa Centre, London) | June 20, 2022 - July 24, 2022
- Where the wild things are Group exhibition | April 9, 2022 - June 11, 2022.
- Radical Care Sanaa Gateja | January 26, 2022 - March 26, 2022
- Iwang Sawa Acaye E. Pamela | September 18, 2021 - October 28, 2021
- I draw, therefore I think SOUTH SOUTH Platform | September 11, 2021 - November 11, 2021
- Just Disruptions Sungi Mlengeya | June 19, 2021 - August 19, 2021
- Rendezvous Group exhibition Abushariaa Ahmed, Salah Elmur, Eltayeb Dawelbait, and Hussein Halfawi | March 20, 2021 - May 20, 2021
- Down In Napak Waswad | November 14, 2020 - January 30, 2021
- (Im)perfections by Richard Atugonza & Odur Ronald | September 26, 2020 - November 5, 2020
- Playing to the Gallery Group Exhibition | July 25, 2020 - September 19, 2020
- Collage broadly defined curated by Sarah Bushra featuring artists’ works from Kampala, Kinshasa, and Nairobi | March 20, 2020 - May 16, 2020
- Options Ronex Ahimbisibwe | February 7, 2020 - March 6, 2020
- Seniority First (Group exhibition) featuring Taga Nuwagaba, Sanaa Gateja, Fred Mutebi, Stephen Gwoktcho, Kizito Maria Kasule, Lilian Nabulime | August 10, 2019 - September 30, 2019
- SURFACE 2 (G.I.R) Gender Identity Rebellion artist discovery workshop by Henry Mzili Mujunga | May 25, 2019 - June 25, 2019
- Brain Damage JB Sekubulwa | March 9, 2019 - April 30, 2019
- Contemplation Ronex Ahimbisibwe | January 11, 2019 - February 14, 2019
- Shadows | December 7, 2018 - January 10, 2019
- Brain Damage John Baptist Ssekubulwa | 2019
- What is beautiful Collin Sekajugo | October 27, 2018 - December 31, 2018
- A portrait of Power, Authority and Control Arim Andrew | August 25, 2018 - October 21, 2018
- Who Is Your Saint? Ocom Adonias | May 25, 2018 - July 25, 2018
- Sculptures (1993 – 2018) Dr. Lilian Nabulime | February 10, 2018 - March 31, 2018
- Memories and… Ronex Ahimbisibwe | January 12, 2018 - February 5, 2018
- Possibilities a design exhibition | December 15, 2017 - February 2, 2018
- Creases and Tears Eria 'Sane' Nsubuga | September 29, 2017 - October 31, 2017
- Gunflowermask Xenson | September 1, 2017 - November 30, 2017
- Surfaces mentored by Henry Mzili Mujunga | June 24, 2017 - August 14, 2017
- To Live Is To Become Waswa Donald | March 31, 2017 - April 18, 2017
- A love that dares curated by Margaret Nagawa | March 5, 2017 - May 6, 2017
- Kampala…A City in Transition Taga Nuwagaba | December 9, 2016 - January 7, 2017
- The art of cancer photography exhibition by History in Progress Uganda (HIP Uganda) and Dr. Marissa Mika | in 2017, old images from the 1960s and 1970s plus new photos of the cancer institute, portraits of children and adults with tumors on their body parts where exhibited during the Uganda cancer Institute's 50th Anniversary celebration.
- Crowd control - six degrees of separation Henry Mzili Mujunga | November 11, 2016 - December 11, 2016
- A Bargain for Woman Fred Mutebi | in 2012, focusing on the achievements of Ugandan women after the 50 years of Uganda's self rule.
- Women Artists in Uganda exhibition i.a. Sheila Nakitende | 2012.
- Dances of Uganda Edison Mugalu | April 13–30, 2012.
- First edition of the Controversial Art Exhibition Kampala Arts Trust | in 2010.
- (Dis)placed KucKidz | in 2009, this exhibition was organised to help children from the Acholi subregion that were displaced by the Lord's Resistance Army (LRA) war to earn money from selling their art.

== Awards and recognitions ==
In 2022, AAG was recognized as one of "10 Galleries that had a breakout year in 2022" by the art market platform Artsy.

== See also ==
- List of art museums
- List of national galleries
- The Uganda Museum
