= Money Awareness and Inclusion Awards =

- MAIAs
- Type: Annual awards
- Awarded for: Work helping people understand and manage money effectively
- Presented by: Michael Gilmore and Trudi Harris
- Status: Active
- Established: October 15, 2021
- First award: May 31, 2022
- Website: maiawards.org

The Money Awareness and Inclusion Awards (MAIAs) are annual international awards presented to organizations, projects, and individuals involved in financial literacy and financial inclusion.

== Overview ==
MAIA awards based in Singapore, were established in 2021 by Michael Gilmore, a finance professional, and Trudi Harris, a marketing communications entrepreneur.

The first MAIA awards ceremony was held in May 2022.

The awards include categories for non-profit projects, for-profit programs, school-age initiatives, academic research, books, and influencers. The judging panels include members from academia, media, non-governmental organizations, and the corporate sector. Judges have included notable individuals such as Annamaria Lusardi, professor of economics at Stanford University, Nanette Medved, philanthropist and founder of Generation Hope in the Philippines, and Olamide Majekodunmi, a financial educator and influencer.

== Notable winners ==
=== 2022 ===
- Best Academic Paper: Annamaria Lusardi
- Best School-Age Financial Education Project: KFI Global
- Best Non-profit for School-Age: finEDge (University of Chicago Financial Education Initiative)
- Best Non-profit for Adult Education: Finanzas en el Cole (Peru)
- Best Non-profit in a Developing Economy: Cha-Ching (Prudence Foundation)
- Best For-profit School-Age Education: KFI Global
- Best Influencer: Rishi Vamdatt (Easy Peasy Finance)

=== 2023 ===
- Best Book (tie): Money with Jess (Jessica Irvine); What They Don't Teach You About Money (Claer Barrett)
- Best Entrepreneurship Education Project: Ascendance – TheTeenageEntrepreneur.com
- Best Non-profit for Underserved Communities: Savvy Ladies Free Financial Helpline for Women
- Best For-profit for Underserved Communities: Aye Finance
- SKBI Prize for Sustainable Finance Literacy: Make My Money Matter

=== 2024 ===
- Best Academic Project or Paper: Veronica Frisancho
- Best For-profit Adult Education: Wealthbrite
- Best Project for Under-Served Communities: MyBnk – The Money House Scotland
- Best School-age Financial Education Project: FT FLIC (Financial Times) – All-school curriculum at City of London Academy
- Best Crypto/Blockchain Education: Aflatoun, Introduction to Crypto and Blockchain Technologies
- Best Entrepreneurship Education: Aflatoun International – Entrepreneurial Mindset Development Program (India)
- Best For-profit for Under-Served Communities: MADCash
- Best Project in a Developing Economy: FINCO – Financial Literacy for Social Good

=== 2025 ===
- Best Content Creators/Aggregators: Topical Talk (The Economist Educational Foundation)
- Best Non-profit Adult Education Project: “Finance for All” (Nova School of Business & Economics)
- Best For-profit for Under-Served Communities: Nickel (Spain)
- Best Non-Profit Project for Under-Served Communities: Uplifters Limited
- Best Non-profit in a Developing Country: Multiply by Creador Foundation
- Closing the Gender Gap: Multiply by Creador Foundation
- Best Entrepreneurship Education: Venture Valley (Singleton Foundation)
- Best Educators: Danny Jang

=== 2026 ===
- Best Academic Project or Paper: Veronica Frisancho
- Best Content Creators/Aggregators: This Is Not Financial Advice (Optimist founded by Chris Temple)
- Best Non-profit Adult Education Project: Credit Canada Gold Financial Coaching
- Best For-profit for Under-Served Communities: Financial Literacy Australia
- Best Non-Profit Project for Under-Served Communities: KNEST Pension Scheme for the Self-Employed
- Closing the Gender Gap: Second Chance Money Skills (Alimursal Ibrahimov, Texas A&M University Corpus Christi)
- Best Entrepreneurship Education: Social Entrepreneurship Incubation (Gloria Kriete Foundation)
- Best Educators: Conrad Krol

== See also ==
- Financial literacy
- Financial inclusion
