= Jeroo Billimoria =

Indian businesswoman (born 1965)

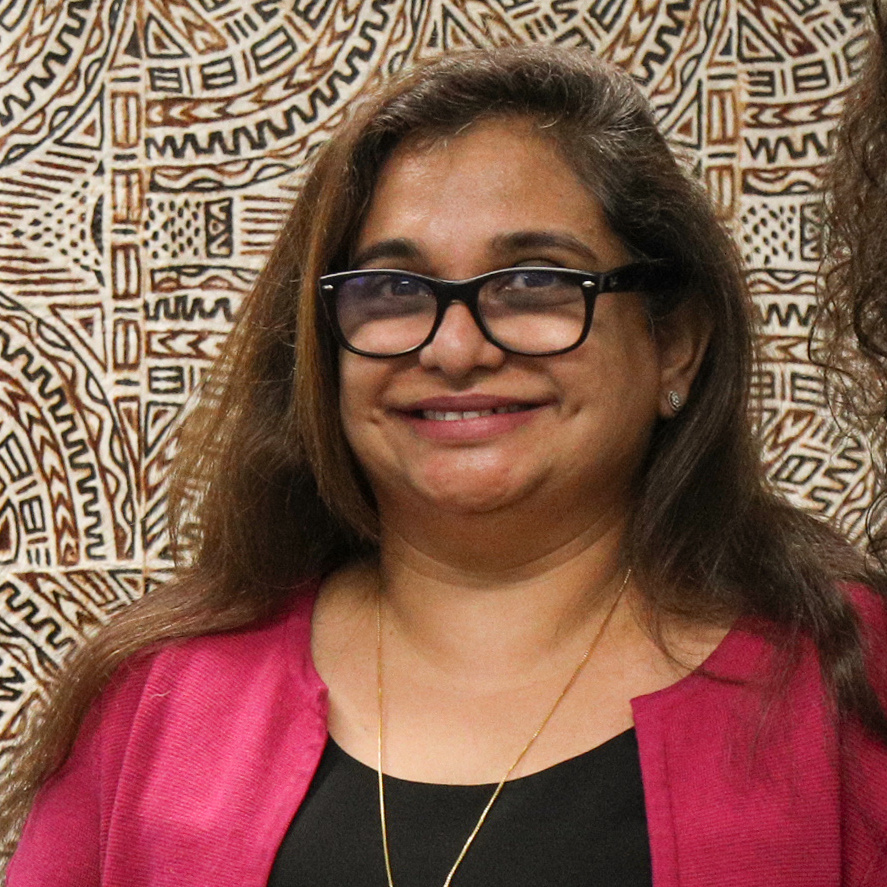
- Born: 20 July 1965 (age 61); Bombay, India
- Education: University of Mumbai (BComm); Tata Institute of Social Sciences (MA); The New School for Social Research (MS)
- Occupation: Social entrepreneur

Jeroo Billimoria (born 20 July 1965) is an Indian social entrepreneur and the founder of several international NGOs. Her work has been featured in several books. Her most recent initiatives include Child and Youth Finance International (CYFI), which Jeroo founded in 2011, Aflatoun (Child Savings International), Childline India Foundation and Child Helpline International. Her most recent initiative is Catalyst Now, (formerly Catalyst 2030).

== Early life and education ==
Billimoria was born in Bombay, India to an accountant and a social worker. Raised in a family strongly committed to social service, her father's early death caused her to dedicate herself to social causes. Billimoria received a Bachelor of Commerce from the University of Mumbai (formerly the University of Bombay) in 1986, an M.A. in Social Work from India's Tata Institute of Social Sciences in 1988 and an M.S. in Non-Profit Management from The New School for Social Research in New York City in 1992. From 1991 to 1999, she was a professor at the Tata Institute of Social Sciences.

== Career ==
=== Social entrepreneurship ===
In 1989 Billimoria travelled for a six months before going back to Tata Institute of Social Sciences and there becoming an instructor. A number of her graduate students were placed as social workers in Bombay's shelters.

As she became aware of the need for an organisation which could co-ordinate the multiple children's agencies in Bombay to efficiently and quickly contact and assist the children, she tried to persuade these services to work with each other. After several failed attempts and having found very little enthusiasm for the idea, she decided to drop her convincing labour.

Instead in 1991, she founded an organisation called Meljol (Coming Together) to bring together children from diverse background to work, side by side, on projects with tangible social benefits. This organisation seeks to develop children's citizenship skills by focusing on their rights and responsibilities and providing them opportunities to contribute positively to their environment. Equal Rights, Opportunities and Respect for all, forms the basis of Meljol's philosophy.

In 1996, Billimoria created Childline India Foundation, a 24-hour emergency telephone service for children, based on her work with children living on the streets of India. Eventually all phones available for public use could dial Childline toll free in order to help children find aid in places where an emergency shelter may not be located. In June 1998, Childline held an event, inviting the government and other people from 29 different cities in India to help spread the Childline phone service. Anand Bordia, joint secretary of India's Ministry of Social Justice and Empowerment, had been in contact with Billimoria about expanding Childline across the country. Following the presentation, Bordia, along with A. P. Singh, deputy secretary of the Ministry of Justice and Social Empowerment, offered to help expand Childline to ten cities. A month later, Maneka Gandhi, India's minister of social justice and empowerment, talked to Billimoria, stating that Childline should be expanded further, offering service to children in all of India's largest cities (totaling more than 1 million in population). In 2002, Childline had expanded to 43 cities in India, with 12 more soon to be added.

Billimoria founded Child Helpline International, an international network of emergency telephone service providers for children. To date this network has answered over 140 million calls across 133 countries. By compiling information on the types of emergencies the children experienced, CHI is able to identify and communicate trends to governmental and non-governmental organisations, allowing emergency assistance to be tailored to fit the specific demands of each community.

After compiling data through the helplines, it became clear that many of the distress calls could be traced to poverty. To address this concern, Billimoria created Aflatoun, a non-profit organisation focused on teaching children their economic rights and responsibilities as well as promoting basic financial management skills and habits. Today her organisation has reached 8 million children in 101 countries.

In July 2011, Billimoria founded Child and Youth Finance International, a global network of states, financial entities and educational institutions dedicated to increasing the financial capabilities and financial inclusion of children and youth through collaboration and resource-sharing.

Recently, Billimoria joined the advisory board of Deedmob, a social startup that is transforming the volunteering sector.

Billimoria is now founder of One Family Foundation, a small private foundation, which incubates social innovations and applies the systems change methodology to help organizations scale. In collaboration with a large group of social entrepreneurs, she is one of the founding members of the Catalyst 2030 movement which aims at accelerating the UN's Sustainable Development Goals by 2030 and working toward changing systems at all levels. The organization was later renamed Catalyst Now.

You can read her views and thoughts about social innovation on her blog: Jeroo is Politically Incorrect

=== Childline ===
Billimoria is the founder of Childline, a hot-line for children homeless Indian children. The organization was aimed at helping children who had been abused, lost, or sick. From 1996 to 2002 when Jeroo retired, Childline received 2.7 million calls. Jeroo was also able to connect with the local police force and hospitals. She was able to put medical booths in areas where many calls were coming in reporting sick children, and even trained police officers to be more aware of children on the streets around them. This ethical fiber is often influenced by a relative who has strong morals and makes an impact on an entrepreneur's early life.

Jeroo Billimoria began Childline as a leveraged nonprofit. As her employees she hired young men and women who had once been street children themselves. These employees could easily spread the word about Childline to the children and understand how best to serve them. Many of her policies were influenced by listening to what the children thought they needed. She also pointed to India's laws to gain government support for Childline.

=== Child and Youth Finance International ===
Billimoria established Child and Youth Finance International (CYFI) as a system change organizations focused on furthering financial literacy and financial inclusion policies and program for young people. In 2019, CYFI the work of CYFI was concluded after having achieved its social mission, and worked with 64,000 partners in 175 countries. It's key initiatives were handed to global institutions. CYFI had four key initiatives, Global Money Week (GMW), Ye! for Young Entrepreneurs, SchoolBank and the Global Inclusion Awards. Global Money Week (GMW) was handed over to the Organisation for Economic Co-operation and Development, Ye! to the International Trade Centre, SchoolBank to Aflatounand the Global Inclusion Awards to the Alliance for Financial Inclusion.

== Recognition and awards ==
In April 2018, Jeroo Billimoria received a Royal Honor from the King of the Netherlands by being appointed Officer of the Order of Orange-Nassau. The Order of Orange-Nassau (Orde van Oranje-Nassau) is a Dutch civilian order of chivalry awarded to persons who have committed outstanding service to society. As an Officer of the Order, Jeroo is now ranked among renowned Dutch politicians, artists and scientists. This Honor recognizes Jeroo's contribution to global society, having established and led multiple international non-governmental organizations based in the Netherlands.

Billimoria is a speaker and advocate of economic empowerment for children. She has been a speaker at the World Economic Forum, the Skoll World Forum for Social Entrepreneurship and several international corporations and universities. Additional awards include:

- Billimoria is listed as #4 in the 2015 edition of "De Dikke Blauwe Top 100" Philanthropy Year Guide.
- Billimoria is ranked 3rd in the charity and non-profit category of Opzij's Top 100 Influential Women 2015
- CYFI listed among Global Journal's Top 100 NGOs (2015) and highlighted as "Most Promising New NGO" (2013)
- Aflatoun named to Global Journal's Top 100 NGOs (2012 and 2013)
- Innovators for the Public Fellowship awarded by Ashoka: Innovators for the Public
- Schwab Fellowship for Social Entrepreneurs
- 2012 Outstanding Social Entrepreneur
- Skoll Award for Social Entrepreneurship
- One of the Phoenix 50 for her work with Aflatoun
- Union of Arab Banks Award for her work with CYFI

== Organizations founded ==
- Telephone Helplines Association
- Credibility Alliance
- Meljol
- Childline India Foundation
- Child Helpline International
- Aflatoun International
- Child and Youth Finance International
- Catalyst Now (formerly Catalyst 2030)

== Published works ==
- Children & Change and Partners for Change (2009)
- Twinkle Star (Std. I to Std. IV) value education textbooks.
- Explorer Series (Std. V to Std. IV) value education textbooks.
- Childline Across India series:
  - Listening to children: An overview to Childline
  - Laying the Foundation: Getting Started and Taking Off
  - Childline at my finger tips: A resource book
  - Spreading the word: Childline awareness strategies
  - Recording children's concerns: Documenting Childline
- The National Initiative for Child Protection
- Voices from the streets: Life stories of children who have called Childline
- Her Blog: Jeroo is Politically Incorrect
