= List of museums in Uganda =

Below is a list of museums in Uganda.

== A-B ==
- Ankole cultural drama actor's museum
- Attitude change museum
- Bamasaaba Cultural Union
- Bulemba Museum
- Bukonzo Cultural Association Museum
- Bunyoro Community Historical Museum Associates
- Busoga Cultural Museum
- Butambala heritage center of Civilization
- Batwa Cultural Experience- Museum trail

== C-G ==
- Cultural Research centre Museum-Jinja
- Charles Nyonyintono Kikonyogo Money Museum
- Gakondo Cultural Museum
- Ebirungi Ebyeira Museum-Jinja

== H-I ==
- Ham Mukasa Museum
- Igongo Cultural Centre
- Iteso Cultural union Museum

== K-N ==
- Ker Kwong'a Panyimur Community Museum
- Karamoja Regional Museum
- Kabale Regional Museum
- Kigulu Cultural Museum-Iganga
- Mountain of the Moon-Fort Portal
- Mt. Elgon Museum of History and Culture-Mbale
- Nyamyarro Museum
- Obudingiya Bwa Bamba (OBB)

== O - T ==
- Ssemagulu Royal Museum

The Ik House of Memory

Ker Kwong Museum - Alur

== U-Z ==
- Uganda Museum
- Uganda Marty's University Museum
- Social Innovation Museum
- Soroti Regional Museum
- St.Luke Community Museum
- Zoological Museum at Makerere University

== See also ==
- uganda Islamic Museum and Research centre
