= Childline India =

Indian youth telephone helpline

CHILDLINE 1098 is a service of Ministry of Women and Child Development. Childline India Foundation is a non-government organisation (NGO) in India that operates a telephone helpline called Childline, for children in distress. It was India's first 24-hour, toll free, phone outreach service for children. Childline 1098 service is available all over India. It is available in 602+ districts, 144+ railway stations and 11 bus terminals have Child Help Desks.

== About ==
CHILDLINE works for the protection of rights of all children aged from 0 to 18. It is an initiative for rescuing and assisting children in distress. Their particular focus is on all children in need of care and protection, especially the more vulnerable sections, including:

- Victims of child sexual abuse.
- Street children and youth living alone on the streets.
- Child labourers are working in unorganised and organised sectors.
- Domestic help, especially girl domestics.
- Children affected by physical / sexual / emotional abuse in family, schools or institutions.
- Children who need emotional support and guidance.
- Children of commercial sex workers.
- Child victims of the flesh trade.
- Victims of child trafficking.
- Children abandoned by parents or guardians.
- Missing children.
- Run away children.
- Children who are victims of substance abuse.
- Differently-abled children.
- Children in conflict with the law.
- Children in institutions.
- Mentally challenged children.
- HIV/ AIDS infected children.
- Children affected by conflict and disaster.
- Child political refugees.
- Children whose families are in crisis.

It also helps children who are in need of care and protection. Childline number is toll-free - 1098 is accessible all over India, and the caller can remain anonymous. Childline receives an average a million calls a month, and CHILDLINE rescues about 400,000 children annually. As per 2011 census of India has over 4.35 million working children between of ages of five to 14 years. Childline's role is limited to addressing calls, ensuring action including rescue, and presenting the child before the Child Welfare Committee (CWC), a quasi-judicial body, as per the Juvenile Justice (Care and Protection of Children) Act, 2015, as rehabilitation is a complex and often unresolved issue in case of children who need further care and protection. After a distressed child is rescued – either from the streets or from any form of employment or confinement – the rescue team of social workers checks if he or she needs medical attention like food or cleanup and provides these and later presented before the Child Welfare Committee (CWC), composed of a chairperson and four members who are usually experts working in the area of child rights and the committee decides the future course for the rescued child like if the child has to be sent to a shelter home. For how long and if the child's parents or guardians are located, he would be sent back to his hometown and in addition the CWC can also order for counselling and rehabilitation of the child.

== History ==
Childline was first established as an experimental project in June 1996, by Jeroo Billimoria, a professor at the Tata Institute of Social Sciences, Mumbai, at the department of Family and Child Welfare. Subsequently, the Government of India established the Childline across India in 1998–99, under Ministry of Women and Child Development, as an umbrella organisation to support and monitor services across India, while also serving as link between the ministry and various NGOs working the field and in year 2021 brought under administrative control of the Ministry of Home Affairs. The move means that police personnel instead of social workers will handle the calls made to 1098. The action will also help in preserving data sensitivity. The Secretary of the Ministry functions as the chairperson of the Governing Board of the Foundation.

In April 2013, a Childline Advisory Board in the West Garo Hills district of Meghalaya state became part of a joint programme by The Ministry of Social Justice and Empowerment and Child Line India. In May 2013, Ahmedabad Childline rescued 16 children aged between 14 and 17 years working various parts of the city.

Childline India Helpline between Apr 2020-Mar 2021 answered 50 lakh calls and rescued or assisted 3.95 Lakh children in distress across the country including over 1 lakh children were provided COVID-19 related assistance.

In October 2020, Foundation had partnered with Uber to provide 30,000 free rides to their child care professionals as a support for reaching and attending to children in distress across country. The association worth over ₹63 lakh covers for the period from October'20 to December'20 and will extend across all 83 Indian cities where Uber is operational. The service also includes transport services to CHILDLINE 1098 personnel in Delhi, Mumbai, Kolkata, Bengaluru and Chennai, where its contact centres operate.

The helpline is oldest for children in India. Also in Karnatka it is part of RTE (Right to Education) Rules. It is mandatory for every school and educational institute to display the Childline number prominently on its campus. Apart from creating awareness, the helpline also sends a message that anyone can call the number in case of any grievances.

The Childline Helpline covers 598 districts in India and receives around 20% of global children's calls on helplines.

== Operations ==
Its head office is on the 11th floor of the Ratan Central Building in Dr. Ambedkar Road, Parel, Mumbai. In addition to Mumbai it also has regional offices in New Delhi, Kolkata, and Chennai and Bengaluru where all calls to 1098 are received 24*7 and later relevant calls are transferred to the collaborative/support NGO of the respective city and in case of need local police of city is informed. The support NGO's are local organisations working in the field of child rights and capable of immediate reach out for rescuing, rehabilitating and counselling children once they get a call from any of the five Child contact centres and also initiate a necessary action plan for fact-finding and intervention and for rescue operation if needed and they also tie up with various government departments including women and child welfare, labour, and the police for requisite support. BOSCO (Bengaluru Oniyavara Seva Coota), APSA (Association for Promoting Social Action) and Sathi are the three organisations that work as support NGO's in Bengaluru and CRT is the nodal agency for Childline in the city which serves as the point of contact for the support NGOs and government departments. APSA once getting a distressed call which are currently mostly pertaining to begging, RTE violations (such as children not getting admission in private schools), and child labour does an in-depth fact-finding study on the field and also collaborates with government departments in case rescue is needed and also provides other support services like medical and psychological counselling to the rescued children in relevant cases. Calling the Childline helps in call getting recorded and officially documented and secondly, the national network of 1098 can be activated immediately if required especially in cases of trafficking for providing immediate support.

== Railway Stations Initiative ==
CHILDLINE Foundation had also set up 144 Child Help Desks in major railway stations across India until 2021 as separate railway initiative was felt given the number of children who run away or go missing or are trafficked for child labour and other reasons from these places and people can immediately and directly approach these help desks. In Bengaluru, the support NGO Sathi works exclusively in railway station premises and has an office at Yeshwantpur railway station. The station is mainly connected to different parts of India. The NGO rescues around 30 to 40 children every month and 70 per cent among them are aged between 14 and 16 years as many of them had either run away from homes or sometimes they are brought by contractors for child labour and once tracked the organisation rescues them and sends them to their native places after counselling.

== See also ==
- Child labour in India
- Child Helpline International
