= Financial Literacy Month =

Annual North American observance

Financial Literacy Month is recognized annually in Canada in November, and National Financial Literacy Month was recognized in the United States in April 2004, in an effort to highlight the importance of financial literacy and teach citizens how to establish and maintain healthy financial habits.

== In Canada ==
November of every year is Canada's Financial Literacy Month. The month is organized by the Financial Literacy Action Group (FLAG), a coalition of 7 non-profit organizations who work with the federal government body Financial Consumer Agency of Canada (FCAC).

Throughout November FLAG organizes events across Canada to educate and engage with the public regarding the need for financial literacy and promote services available to the public:

[FLAG] raises awareness of the need for financial literacy and highlights the programs, services and tools available to help Canadians improve their financial knowledge, skills and confidence.

The purpose of this month is to educate the public so Canadians are equipped to:

- Provide for themselves and their family
- Invest in their future and the future of their children
- Understand their financial rights and obligations
- Contribute to the community as a good citizen

Many of the country's financial institutions (such as Planswell, Wealthsimple, RBC) and nonprofit financial educational organizations promote the month by creating educational material and hosting promotional events that center around topics of personal finances.

== In the United States ==
Financial Literacy Month grew out of Youth Financial Literacy Day, which originated with the National Endowment for Financial Education (NEFE) as an activity of its High School Financial Planning Program. NEFE passed responsibility for Financial Literacy Day over to the Jump$tart Coalition which now promotes it with its partner organizations. Jump$tart Coalition began promoting April as Financial Literacy for Youth Month in 2000. The title was eventually shortened to Financial Literacy Month.

In 2003 the United States Congress showed its support for the idea of a financial literacy month when Senate Resolution 48 and House Resolution 127 asked President George W. Bush to declare April Financial Literacy for Youth Month. At that time, governors of eight states had already named the month of April as such. April 2004 was named National Financial Literacy Month by the passing of Senate Resolution 316 with unanimous consent.

In April 2005, the United States House of Representatives passed a bill supporting the goals and ideals of Financial Literacy Month for April 2005. This bill, and the resolution passed by the Senate, called on President Bush to issue a proclamation calling on Federal Government, States, localities, schools, nonprofit organizations business and the people of the United States to observe the month with appropriate programs and activities. During his time in office, President Bush did not issue a proclamation. President Obama proclaimed April as National Financial Literacy Month in at least two years of his time in office.

During Financial Literacy Month in 2006, The Financial Literacy and Education Commission unveiled a new national strategy in their report "Taking Ownership of the Future: The National Strategy for Financial Literacy". The report outlined a series of outreach and education goals for the public and private sectors aimed to help Americans improve their understanding of financial issues such as credit management, savings, and home ownership.

Throughout the years, multiple states have also proclaimed April as Financial Literacy Month including Arkansas, Oklahoma, Pennsylvania, and Texas.

== See also ==
- Financial literacy curriculum
