= GMW =

GMW may refer to:

- Global Money Week
- GMW Architects, a defunct British architectural practice
- Guangming Online, a Chinese news website
- Heckler & Koch GMW, a German grenade launcher
- West Germanic languages
