= C.N. Kikonyogo Money Museum =

The C.N. Kikonyogo Money Museum is a Ugandan museum showcasing the numismatic heritage of the country and is operated by the Bank of Uganda.It is located at Plot 45 Kampala Road, Kampala.

== History and etymology ==
As part of its 40th anniversary celebrations, the central bank opened the museum on 15 August 2006.

The museum was named after Charles Nyonyintono Kikonyogo, the 8th governor of the Bank of Uganda, in recognition of his contribution to Uganda's economy.

== Collection ==
The museum is located within the premises of the central bank and is open to the general public, at no cost.

Its collection comprises commemorative coins and medals, pre-money items used in the area that comprises present-day Uganda protectorate, Uganda's early forms of currency such as the rupee as well as both historical and contemporary notes and coins among others. It also holds historical prints, publications and photos that showcase the history of the bank.

As of 2020, the museum was listed as having participated in the Global Money Week.

== See also ==
- Bank of Uganda
- List of Museums in Uganda
- Ugandan shilling
- Governor of the Bank of Uganda
