= Complaint handling process (Canada) =

Process used by Canadian financial institutions

In Canada every federally regulated financial institution is required by law to have a complaint handling process (CHP), a document outlining the process that the financial institution makes available to consumers who wish to lodge a complaint. Every CHP must include certain steps, including referral to ombud services and government regulatory agencies at appropriate levels.

Financial institutions must provide their CHP to consumers who request it. They must also file their CHP with the Financial Consumer Agency of Canada (FCAC), which posts all CHPs of federally regulated financial institutions on its website, in a searchable database.
