= Creador =

Private equity firm

- Website type: Private
- Founded: 2011, 15 years ago
- Headquarters: Kuala Lumpur, {{{location_country}}}
- Founder: Brahmal Vasudevan
- CEO: Brahmal Vasudevan
- Key people: D. Cyril Noerhadi, Chairman, Indonesia; Kevin Loh, Senior Managing Director; Kabir Thakur, Managing Director, Head of India; Omar Mahmoud, Managing Director, Head of Philippines, Singapore and Thailand
- Industry: Private Equity
- Products: Growth Capital

Creador is a private equity firm focused on growth capital investments in South and Southeast Asia, primarily Malaysia, India, Indonesia, Vietnam, Singapore, Thailand and the Philippines.

Creador is headquartered in Malaysia, with four additional offices in India, Indonesia, Vietnam, and the Philippines.

Established in 2011 by Brahmal Vasudevan, the firm has raised $3.1billion of investor commitments across 6 private equity funds since inception.

The firm invests in 5 principle industries including consumer, retail, financial services, business services, and healthcare.

== Private Equity Firm ==
Established in 2011, Creador has raised a total of $3.1billion from leading endowments, fund of funds, pension funds, banks, insurance companies and family offices across the world.

== Milestones and Prominent Investments ==
Creador has six funds, Creador I, Creador II, and Creador III, Creador IV, Creador V and Creador VI with total Assets Under Management (AUM) of $3.1 billion.

Fund	Amount (in US$ million)	Year of Establishment	Status
Creador I	130	2011	Fully deployed across 7 investments.
Creador II	331	2013	Fully deployed across 14 investments.
Creador III	419	2015	Fully deployed across 10 investments.
Creador IV	580	2018	Fully deployed across 11 investments.
Creador V	700	2021	Currently being deployed.
Creador VI	930	2024	Currently being deployed.

=== Creador I ===
Established in 2011, Creador closed its maiden fund, Creador I, at US$130 million. There were a total of seven investments made in this fund across Indonesia, Malaysia, and India.

Investment	Year	Company Description
Cholamandalam	2012	Cholamandalam is a pan-Indian composite financial services provider established in 1978 and is engaged in the business of providing vehicle financing, home equity financing, business financing, stock broking and distribution of financial products. Creador invested around Rs 106 crore in Cholamandalam in early 2012. Creador exited their investment in June 2016 and generated 5x returns in local currency terms.
OldTown White Coffee	2012	OldTown is Malaysia Asian restaurant chain and in the coffee segment. Established in 1999, OldTown comprises two business segments: F&B restaurants and Retail ready-to-drink coffee. The group launched its restaurant business in 2005 and has over 200 outlets in Malaysia, Singapore, Indonesia, and China. Creador had invested $15 million in the company and has now fully exited this investment.
Repco	2013	A housing finance company promoted by Repco Bank, which is based in Chennai, Tamil Nadu. The company was backed by Carlyle and Creador in 2013, and in 2014 Creador has sold its stake and generated 2.6x returns in USD terms.
Simba	2013	Simba is the cereal player in Indonesia. Established in 1997, Simba also has a presence in the snacks segment in Indonesia and a private label export snacks business. Simba was Creador's second investment in Indonesia after MNC Skyvision. Creador acquired Simba from Godrej Consumer Products Limited.
BFI	2013	BFI is a multi-finance company in Indonesia. Established in 1981, the company focuses its business on the financing of cars and motorcycles for the middle and lower-middle segment of the economy.

=== Creador II ===
Creador's second fund, Creador II closed at $331 million in 2014 and the fund was fully deployed across 14 investments. Concurrently and in 2013, Creador established a dedicated operations and strategy team, known as Creador+.

Investment	Year	Company Description
GHL	2013	Creador acquired a stake in GHL in November 2013. In March 2017, Creador sold its stake at GHL Systems to Actis. Creador exited from GHL with a return of 2.8x in local currency terms.
Somany Ceramics	2014	Established in 1968, Somany Ceramics Limited (SCL) is an Indian tiles producer including vitrified tiles. Creador bought the stake in Somany in early 2014. In April 2017, Creador fully exited its investment in Somany Ceramics with a return of 5.3x in local currency terms.
CTOS Data System	2014	A credit bureau in Malaysia, providing data and analytical tools to clients.
Asiamet Education Group	2015	ASIAMET Education Group Berhad is a Medical and Allied Health education provider in Malaysia. Asiamet operates across Peninsular and East Malaysia.
RedCap	2015	Established in 1998, RedCap Pharmacy (formerly known as D'Apotic) is a retail pharmacy chain currently operating in the southern and central region of Peninsular Malaysia.

=== Creador III ===
For its third fund, Creador raised $419 million and deployed it across 10 investments.

Investment	Year	Company Description
City Union Bank	2016	City Union Bank (CUB) is a listed private, scheduled commercial bank in India focused on financing to Small and Medium Enterprises (SME), Trade and Retail segments.
Corona Remedies	2016	Indian based pharmaceuticals company that produce a wide range drugs in therapeutic segments like the cardio diabetic, nutraceuticals, gynecology, orthopedic and pediatrics
MR.DIY	2016	MR.DIY is a home improvement retailer in Malaysia. The company retails a variety of household, hardware and electrical products. Established in 2005 and with its strong presence in Malaysia, MR.DIY launched its first international outlet in Bangkok, Thailand in January 2016 and has now grown to become the largest home improvement retailer in the region.
Ventaserv	2016	Ventaserv is a vending machine supplier based in Malaysia. In 2017, Ventaserv became the first vending machine provider that adopted a cashless payment system such as TnG cards and other major credit cards.
Hermina	2017	Hermina Group is one of the largest private general hospital chains in Indonesia with 28 hospitals and 2,800 operating beds across 17 tier 1 and tier 2 cities. The Group was initially founded as a single maternity clinic in the 1970s but has now developed into a multi-specialty general hospital chain with a core expertise in women and children care.
Paras	2017	Paras Healthcare is a North India focused hospital chain offering secondary and tertiary care services. Established in 2006.
MR.DIY Indonesia	2017	Established in 2017, MR.DIY Indonesia is part of the regional expansion of MR.DIY Malaysia, which currently operates in countries across Asia Pacific. Headquartered in Jakarta, MR.DIY Indonesia retails a variety of household, hardware, and electrical equipment tailored to home improvement.
Bake with Yen	2017	Established in 1987, Bake With Yen (BWY) is the largest specialty bakery and food ingredients retailer with presence in Peninsular and East Malaysia.
Ujjivan	2017	Ujjivan is the holding company of Ujjivan Small Finance Bank. Incorporated in 2004, Ujjivan serves over 3.5 million customers through its network of pan India branch network.
Mobile World	2018	Established in 2004, Mobile World Group (MWG) is the largest organised retailer in Vietnam with close to 2,000 retail outlets in all 63 provinces in the country.

=== Creador IV ===
In 2018, Creador closed $580 million for its fourth fund, and fully deployed it across 11 investments.

Investment	Year	Company Description
MR.DIY Philippines	2018	MR.DIY Philippines is part of another regional expansion of MR.DIY Malaysia. Headquartered in Manila, MR.DIY Philippines retails a variety of household, hardware and electrical equipment tailored to home improvement.
Kogta Financial (India) Limited	2018	Incorporated in 1996, Kogta is an emerging retail non-bank finance company (‘NBFC’) offering finance for used and new vehicles apart from providing small-ticket secured loans to micro and small enterprises. As of September 2019, it has a network of approximately 105 branches across 8 states and union territories in Central and West India.
iValue	2019	iValue Group (iValue Infosolutions Ltd.) is an Indian technology solutions provider specializing in cybersecurity, digital transformation, cloud services, and data management. Founded in 2008, the company operates as a strategic information technology advisor, distinguishing itself from traditional value-added distributors. It offers curated and customized ready-to-consume solution stacks across various sectors. It serves clients across India and other regions like Sri Lanka, Bangladesh, and Singapore.
Eco-Shop	2019	Established in 2003, Eco-shop is one of the largest value retailers in Malaysia. The company sells a variety of products such as food, consumables as well as daily household necessities.
GHL Systems (re-investment)	2020	GHL Systems established a customer base beyond Malaysia, with key operations in the Philippines and Thailand. In February 2014, GHL acquired e-pay Asia Limited (e-pay), another electronic payment service provider.
Shriji Polymers	2020	Shriji is a rigid plastic packaging provider for the regulated pharma market, a Drug Master File holder for US FDA, Canadian FDA and Chinese FDA.
LOOB Holding Sdn Bhd (Tealive)	2021	Tealive is Malaysia’s largest Made-To-Order (“MTO”) beverage provider, with presence in Vietnam, Myanmar, Brunei, Philippines, Australia, United Kingdom. The Group now has more than 600 stores nationwide.
