= Aflatoun =

Non-governmental organization

Aflatoun International
- Founded: 2005 by Jeroo Billimoria in Amsterdam, Netherlands
- Type: Non-governmental organization
- Purpose: Social and Financial Education for Children and Young People
- Region served: Worldwide
- Website: http://www.aflatoun.org

Aflatoun International is a non-governmental organization focusing on educating children about their rights and responsibilities and managing financial resources through social and financial education. Headquartered in Amsterdam, Netherlands, The Aflatoun programmes, consisting of Aflatot, Aflatoun and Aflateen, are currently implemented in 116 countries by its 192 partner organizations. Aflatoun International is annually reaching 4 million children around the world of which 60% are saving money.

== Social and financial education ==
Aflatoun International provides children with social and financial education. Through balancing social learning and financial concepts, the Aflatoun programmes empower children to believe in themselves, know their rights and responsibilities, understand and practice saving and spending, and start their own enterprises. These can include organizing social campaigns, setting up savings systems and starting small scale financial enterprises. Through the notion of Social & Financial Education, children are empowered to make a positive change in their lives and in their communities, with the aim of ultimately leading them to breaking the cycle of poverty in which many find themselves.

== Background ==
The inspiration for Aflatoun comes from Jeroo Billimoria, an Indian national who grew up and worked among the street children of Mumbai. Seeing that many of these children were quite entrepreneurial, she thought it important that children be able to understand their self-worth, rights, and be able to manage their own resources.

The Aflatoun concept was first tested in India 18 years ago, introducing financial concepts in a school-based child rights programme. Billimoria saw that the children reacted well to the games, activities and songs. Due to this success, other countries were approached to discuss whether a similar concept could bring the same benefits to their communities.

In November 2005, the Aflatoun Network was formally launched in Amsterdam, the Netherlands. A global initiative involving ten more countries began, and today Aflatoun is active in 109 countries. In March 2008, Aflatoun's worldwide campaign for Child Social and Financial Education was launched with the help of the Netherlands' Princess Maxima. It achieved its goal of reaching 75 countries and 1 million children by 2010.

== Name and Character ==
The name Aflatoun was chosen by the children who first participated in the program in India and is based on a Bollywood movie they liked (Aflatoon). The chosen character is portraying a little fireball from outer space. Aflatoun was created to lead children through their learning journey and help to create emotional attachment between children and the program material. Thus, the Aflatoun character is the unifying symbol that brings together all the Aflatoun children around the world.

== Network ==
The Aflatoun Network is a participative and inclusive network of organizations who bring the programme to children. The Aflatoun programme is delivered by local partners at the country-level as they best understand the local context. They become the owners of the programme, contextualising the materials and training teachers. The Secretariat in Amsterdam serves as a resource centre for the partners to facilitate information flow and capacity building. Also included in the Aflatoun Network are stakeholders such as financial institutions, microfinance institutions, corporations, researchers, International non-governmental organizations, multilaterals and bilaterals, among others.
