= Jump$tart =

US non-profit coalition of national organization

- Jump$tart Coalition for Personal Financial Literacy
- Formation: 1995; 31 years ago
- Type: Nonprofit organization
- Legal status: Coalition
- Location: Washington, DC, United States
- Region served: United States
- Services: Advocacy, research, standards and educational resources
- Website: www.jumpstart.org

The Jump$tart Coalition for Personal Financial Literacy is a US non-profit coalition of national organizations seeking to advance the financial literacy students from pre-kindergarten through to college-aged. The coalition endeavors to provide young people with lifelong financial decision-making skills. By working together with its 150 national partners, the Jump$tart Coalition provides advocacy, research, standards and educational resources. It is headquartered in Washington, DC.

== History ==
William Odom, former chairman and CEO of Ford Motor Credit Company, is credited with the concept that led to formation of the Jump$tart Coalition in 1995. Odom's contribution to the financial literacy effort continues to be recognized through the award that bears his name, the William E. Odom Visionary Leadership Award. H. Randy Lively, former president and CEO of the American Financial Services Association, organized the first meeting of what was then called the "Partnership in Personal Finance and Consumer Credit Consortium." Through the next year, Dr. Lewis Mandell developed the financial literacy survey that is now a hallmark of the Jump$tart Coalition's work.

Students from Bladensburg High School in Maryland helped create the slogan ("Financial Smarts for Students") and logo. In 1997, the Jump$tart Coalition was incorporated with Lively serving as the first Chairman of Jump$tart. He was succeeded in 2008 by Neil Milner, President and CEO of the Conference of State Bank Supervisors, who served as Chairman through 2011.

In 2013, Laura Levine served as the president and CEO, with Chairman Ted Beck (president and CEO of the National Endowment for Financial Education). The leadership also includes Mike Staten, Ph.D., of the University of Arizona and Maxine Sweet, of Experian, who serve as Treasurer and Secretary, respectively.

== Organization ==
The Jump$tart Coalition comprises more than 150 corporate, academic, non-profit and government organizations that, together, provide advocacy, research, standards and educational resources for financial education.

The Coalition also includes a network of 49 affiliated state coalitions that operate on a local level to promote financial literacy. Most of the state affiliates are modeled after the national Jump$tart Coalition, although some serve a broader target audience and some do not use the Jump$tart name. State coalitions operate under independent leadership and bylaws and are connected to national Jump$tart Coalition through affiliation agreements. State coalitions are run primarily by volunteers, and are assisted by national Jump$tart's four regional consultants.

== Work ==
The Jump$tart Coalition maintains the National Standards in K-12 Personal Finance Education, which serve as a program-design and evaluation framework for school administrators, teachers, curriculum specialists, instructional materials developers, and educational policymakers. The Jump$tart Coalition developed the first national conference devoted to classroom teachers of personal finance in 2009.

In 2000, the month of April was promoted as Financial Literacy Month for Youth and later National Financial Literacy Month to highlight the importance of financial literacy in America. The Jump$tart Coalition, Junior Achievement, and the Council for Economic Education founded “Financial Literacy Day on Capitol Hill” in 2003, which has since been held every April.

Since 2000, the Jump$tart Coalition has administered the Survey of Personal Financial Literacy among high school students biennially to determine and better understand the level of financial literacy among high school students. The 2008 iteration of the survey extended its reach to college students.
