= MoneyForce =

MoneyForce is a program that aims to improve the financial capability of the UK Armed Forces by providing guidance related to all those serving in the military and their families.

The ethos and branding is built around the concept of getting 'MoneyFit' with MoneyForce and the MoneyForce website is fronted by former Olympic gold medallist Dame Kelly Holmes.

Comprising online resources and briefings at military bases across the UK, the program is delivered for the Ministry of Defence by the Royal British Legion. Funding comes from the Standard Life Charitable Trust, and some of the online content is provided by the Money Advice Service.

== History ==
The program was officially launched in March 2013 by Mark Francois, the Minister for Defence Personnel, Welfare and Veterans, at the Royal Artillery Barracks in Woolwich.

Development of the MoneyForce program was overseen by Lieutenant-General Sir Bill Rollo.
