= Financial Consumer Agency of Canada =

Government of Canada agency that enforces consumer protection regulations

- Agence de la consommation en matière financière du Canada

Agency overview
- Formed: 2001
- Jurisdiction: Government of Canada
- Headquarters: Ottawa, Ontario
- Employees: 209
- Annual budget: $45.9M (CAD)
- Agency executive: Shereen Benzvy Miller, Commissioner
- Website: www.canada.ca/en/financial-consumer-agency.html

The Financial Consumer Agency of Canada (French: Agence de la consommation en matière financière du Canada, FCAC) is an agency of the Government of Canada that enforces consumer protection legislation, regulations and industry commitments by federally regulated financial entities. It also provides programs and information to help consumers understand their rights and responsibilities when dealing with financial institutions and promotes financial literacy.

== Mandate ==
FCAC has a dual mandate, set out in the Financial Consumer Agency of Canada Act. Broadly, these two main elements are:

- ensuring and enforcing compliance by the financial sector with federal legislation and regulations, as well as voluntary codes of conduct and public commitments
- promoting greater financial literacy by informing consumers about their rights and responsibilities when dealing with financial entities and payment card network operators.

Under its compliance mandate, FCAC is responsible for:

- ensuring that the market conduct of federally regulated financial entities complies with federal legislation and regulations
- promoting the adoption of policies and procedures designed to implement legislation, regulation, voluntary codes of conduct and public commitments by federally regulated financial entities
- monitoring federally regulated financial entities' compliance with voluntary codes of conduct and their own public commitments.

Under financial literacy, FCAC is responsible for:

- helping consumers better understand financial products and services, as well as their rights and responsibilities when dealing with financial institutions.
- providing tools and resources to help Canadians understand and manage their finances.
- monitoring and evaluating trends and emerging issues that may affect consumers of financial products and services.
- developing educational programs and workshops, in collaboration with organizations across the country, to help Canadians manage their finances and make informed financial decisions.

== Scope ==
FCAC monitors and supervises financial institutions and external complaints bodies that are regulated under federal legislation. These entities include all banks and federally incorporated or registered insurance, trust and loan companies, retail associations, federal credit unions and external complaints bodies. FCAC also supervises payment card network operators to determine whether they are in compliance with the provisions of the Payment Card Networks Act.

FCAC does not regulate foreign bank representative offices, fraternal benefit societies or cooperative credit associations.

A complete list of federally regulated financial institutions is available from the Office of the Superintendent of Financial Institutions (OSFI).

As a regulatory agency, FCAC can exercise its enforcement powers to ensure that federally regulated financial entities comply with the consumer provisions of the various federal acts relating to financial services, including:

- the Bank Act
- the Insurance Companies Act
- the Trust and Loan Companies Act
- the Cooperative Credit Associations Act
- the Green Shield Canada Act
- the Payment Card Networks Act
- the Financial Consumer Agency of Canada Act.

In cases of contravention or non-compliance with legislation, FCAC notifies the federally regulated financial entity of a violation. Depending on the severity and frequency of the problem, the Agency may also:

- seek a commitment from the financial entity to remedy the issue within a short time
- impose a monetary penalty
- impose criminal sanctions
- take other actions as necessary.

== History ==
The Agency was established in 2001 by the federal government to strengthen oversight of consumer issues and expand consumer education in the financial sector.

FCAC's creation was one in a series of initiatives resulting from an extensive period of study and public consultation on financial sector reform.

In December 1996, the Government of Canada launched the Task Force on the Future of the Canadian Financial Services Sector, one of several initiatives following extensive debate and consultation on reform of the financial sector.

In September 1998, the Task Force presented the federal government with its report, Change, Challenge, Opportunity (known as the MacKay Report). One of the Task Force's findings was that "the current framework for consumer protection is not as effective as it should be in reducing the information and power imbalance between institutions and consumers." Two parliamentary committees reviewed the Task Force Report, held public consultations across the country and presented their own recommendations.

A broad consensus on ways to improve the financial sector emerged through this process. In June 1999, the government released a policy paper, Reforming Canada's Financial Services Sector: A Framework for the Future, containing 57 reform measures. Among them was a proposal to create a financial consumer agency to oversee consumer interests and improve consumer protection. Legislation to implement the reform package was passed on June 14, 2001.

The Financial Consumer Agency of Canada opened its doors in 2001 under the Financial Consumer Agency of Canada Act.

In its first year, FCAC established a website and a call centre for consumers to make complaints and ask questions about their rights and responsibilities regarding financial products and services.

In 2007, the Government of Canada provided FCAC with an additional $3 million for the creation of the Financial Literacy Initiative.

In 2009, new federal legislation gave FCAC oversight over payment card network operators.

On July 11, 2010, amendments to the Financial Consumer Agency of Canada Act further expanded FCAC's role in four areas:

1. increased ability to do research, field testing and stakeholder engagement to provide information to the government on financial consumer trends and emerging issues
2. expanded consumer information role to cover all matters related to protecting consumers of financial products and services
3. responsibility for overseeing the Payment Card Networks Act (PCNA) and any related regulations
4. promoting public awareness of the PCNA and the Code of Conduct for the Credit and Debit Card Industry in Canada.

As a result of amendments to the Bank Act in 2010 which provided for federally regulated credit unions, FCAC became responsible for supervising and monitoring such credit unions' compliance with applicable legislation and regulations.

In August 2010, the Code of Conduct for the Credit and Debit Card Industry came into force. FCAC opened its new Research Branch as part of its expanded mandate.

November 2011 was the first Financial Literacy Month. FCAC, together with a group of community organizations called the Financial Literacy Action Group (FLAG), organized workshops and other events across Canada to promote financial literacy among consumers. In March 2012, the Parliament of Canada officially designated November as Financial Literacy Month in Canada.

In December 2018, the Government of Canada passed legislation to modernize Canada's Financial Consumer Protection Framework (FCPF) and to strengthen FCAC's mandate and grant it additional powers. The Financial Consumer Agency of Canada Act outlines FCAC's functions, administration and enforcement powers, and lists the sections of federal laws and regulations under its supervision.

== Organization ==
FCAC is headed by a Commissioner, appointed for a five-year term. The Commissioner reports annually to the Parliament of Canada through the Minister of Finance, on the Agency's activities and on the performance of financial institutions in complying with consumer protection measures.

The first Commissioner was Bill Knight, a former senior executive and Member of Parliament in the House of Commons of Canada. He retired in 2006.

Ursula Menke was appointed Commissioner in December 2007. Before her mandate at FCAC, Ms. Menke held various positions giving her more than 30 years' experience in financial and legal affairs in both the public and private sectors, including the Privy Council Office, the Department of Finance and the Metropolitan Life Insurance Company.

Lucie Tedesco, was appointed Commissioner on September 4, 2013. Prior to her appointment as Commissioner, Ms Tedesco held the roles of Acting Commissioner and Deputy Commissioner with the FCAC. She joined the Agency, after serving as Vice-President, Insurance and Loan Operations and Vice-President, Strategy & Planning with Export Development Canada.

FCAC's last permanent Commissioner, Judith Robertson, began her appointment on August 19, 2019, for a term of 5 years. She was replaced by interim Commissioner Werner Liedtke on February 23, 2024.

== Supervision and enforcement ==
Under its compliance and enforcement mandate, the Agency investigates cases of non-compliance with consumer protection measures as set out in Canadian legislation. FCAC identifies potential cases using consumer complaints, as well as through the inquiries and investigations of its officers. The Agency's commissioner can impose a variety of penalties on institutions found to be in violation of consumer measures, including monetary penalties and public naming of the institution.

FCAC's Commissioner reports to Parliament annually with an assessment of federally regulated institutions' compliance with legislation.

== Consumer education ==
Under its consumer education mandate, FCAC produces timely and objective resources and tools related to understanding and managing personal finances and financial products and services. On Canada.ca/money, FCAC offers information on a variety of financial topics, along with online interactive tools that can help consumers find the financial products and services that best meet their needs, including a Budget Planner, Mortgage Calculator, and Financial Goal Calculator. FCAC also develops infographics and videos to help consumers strengthen their financial literacy, which can be followed and shared on Twitter, Instagram, Facebook, LinkedIn and YouTube.

FCAC offers different financial education programs aimed at a wide range of age groups, including financial workshops and e-learning videos for young adults, a workshop aimed at better understanding credit reports, and learning programs to help adults manage their personal finances.

FCAC also offers a free online resource, financial wellness in the workplace that provides Canadian employers with the strategies, tools and resources needed to build and implement a financial wellness program within their workplace, including a section specifically tailored to employees.

== See also ==
- List of financial supervisory authorities by country
