= Consumer Financial Education Body =

- Successor: Money Advice Service
- Formation: April 26, 2010
- Founder: UK Government
- Dissolved: 2011; 15 years ago
- Type: Governmental organisation
- Purpose: Financial education
- Location: London, United Kingdom

The Consumer Financial Education Body (CFEB) was an independent British body that promoted personal financial literacy in the United Kingdom. It became the Money Advice Service in 2011.

== History ==
CFEB was established by the Financial Services Authority (FSA) as required by the Financial Services and Markets Act 2000 (as amended by the Financial Services Act 2010), and came into existence on April 26, 2010. The body has a mandate from Parliament, with all-party support, to develop consumer financial education in the UK and is responsible for enhancing the public's understanding and knowledge of financial matters and their ability to manage their own financial affairs.

Tony Hobman was named CEO of the new organisation, taking over on May 17, 2010. Chris Pond, Director of Financial Capability at the FSA was named a senior advisor to both CFEB and the FSA. 134 FSA staff in the FSA's financial capability division were transferred to CFEB, located in offices at Canary Wharf, London in its first year.

On April 4, 2011, CFEB was rebranded as the Money Advice Service.
