= Financial literacy curriculum =

Curriculum teaching basic financial skills

Money Monster - Character in CFPB's Financial Literacy Curriculum for Kids

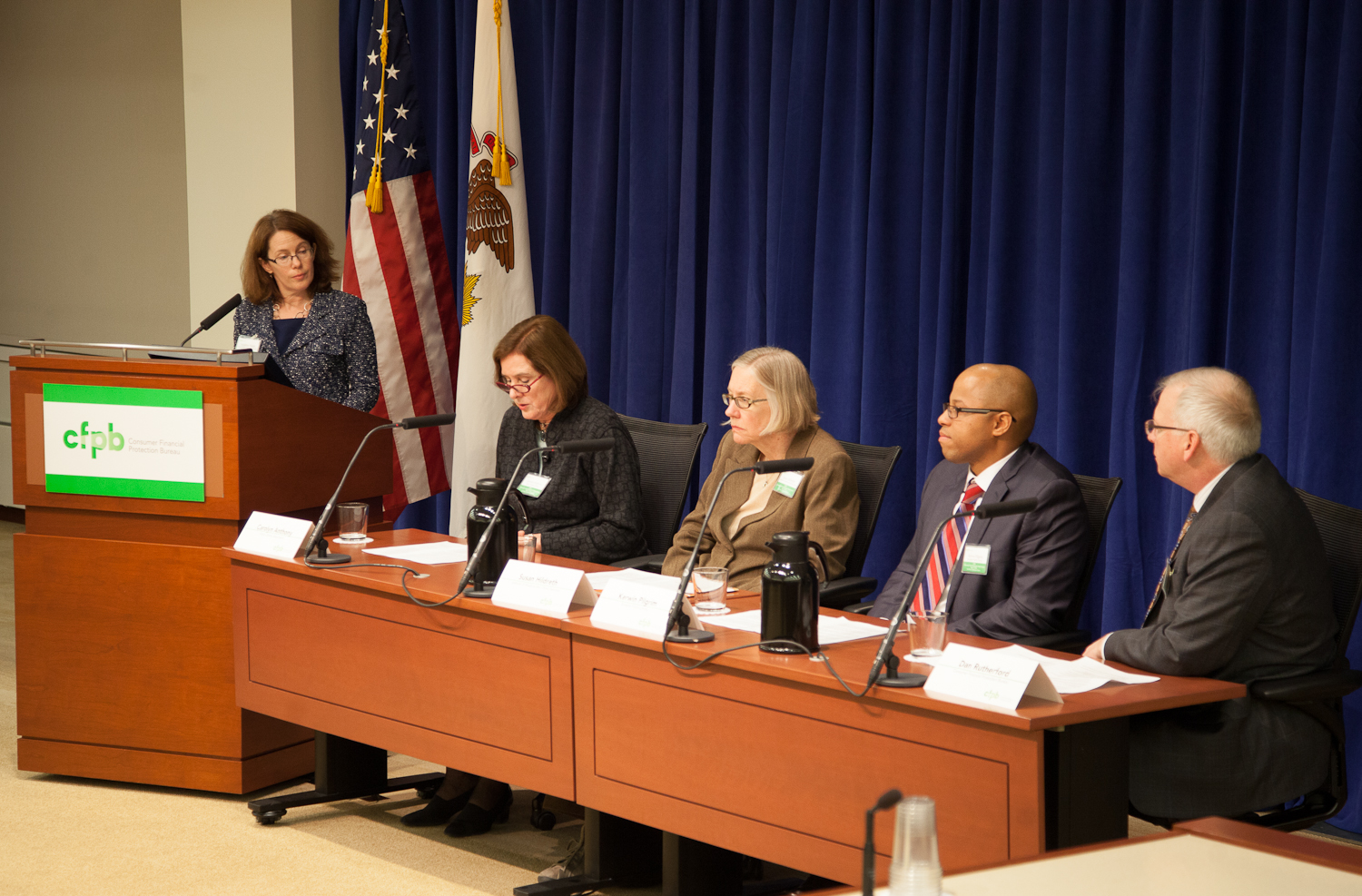
CFPB Financial Education Project Launch in Chicago, Illinois, 2014

A financial literacy curriculum refers to educational teachings which help teach financial literacy and how to apply the knowledge effectively in life. This covers financial knowledge such as personal finance management, risk identification, savings, investments and others.

== Overview ==
PISA Scores 2012 showing financial literacy scores of students in 65 economies.
