= Child Helpline International =

Global network of child helplines

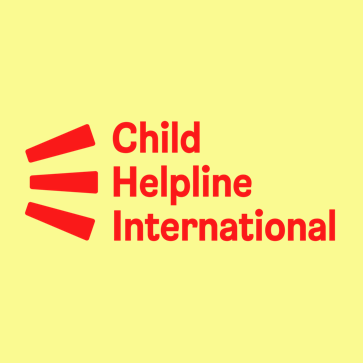
- Founded: 2003; 23 years ago
- Type: NGO
- Location: Pilotenstraat 20-22, 1059 CJ Amsterdam, The Netherlands
- Region served: Worldwide
- Members: 173
- CEO: Patrick Krens
- Employees: 11
- Volunteers: 2
- Website: www.childhelplineinternational.org

Child Helpline International is a global network of 173 child helplines in 142 countries (as of December 2019).

== History ==
In 1989, Child Helpline International founder Jeroo Billimoria explored the idea of creating a global network of child helplines, which could provide technical assistance to each other, and in countries who wanted to start or expand their own helplines. This led to a meeting, held in Amsterdam in 2003, and attended by representatives from 49 child helplines from around the globe. At this meeting, Child Helpline International was launched.

== Principle and Mission ==
The work of Child Helpline International is firmly grounded in the principle of United Nations Convention on the Rights of the Child, which highlights the children's rights to privacy and protection from harm.

The stated mission of the Child Helpline International network is to provide a forum for information sharing and mutual support, assistance with advocacy and lobbying, promoting the rights of children and child helplines as a medium of assistance to children, and to support the initiation and development of child helplines in countries which do not have such services.

== Operations ==
Child Helpline International is based in Amsterdam, Netherlands. The Executive Director of Child Helpline International is Patrick Krens. Child Helpline International is a membership-based organization with 173 members in 142 countries and territories around the world (as at December 2018). In 2015, the child helplines who are members of Child Helpline International had received over 20 million contacts from children and young people in need for care and protection.

== Knowledge Exchange Platform ==
A key role of the network is to provide platform for knowledge transfers between the members. Types of knowledge exchange activities are:

1. Peer Exchanges: Members of the network learn from one another through visits, sharing solutions, comparing expertise and experiences.
2. Peer Evaluations: Member organizations compare and evaluate good practices, governance and operations of their own child helplines with other members.
3. Trainings and Workshops: Member organizations learn from trainings and workshops to make sure that each child helpline stay abreast of changing times and needs and possess the up-to-date skills
4. International and Regional Consultations: International and Regional Consultations are biennial events held in alternating years in which the members, partners, and stakeholders come together to find common ground, report and reflect on collective experiences from the existing child helplines.
