= MyBnk =

MyBnk is a UK social enterprise and charity who specialise in financial education and enterprise for 7-25-year-olds with the goal of equipping young people with the skills to manage money and become work-ready. It was founded in 2007 by now CEO Lily Lapenna and Michael Norton OBE to tackle record personal debt and encourage business start ups. Lapenna was shortlisted for a 'Women of the Future Award' in 2015. She believes that young people feel “a sense of disillusionment, disengagement and distrust” towards banks.

MyBnk has been described as an award-winning charity specialising in teaching young people how to manage their money. It has been considered one of the "great organisations out there inspiring the next generation of entrepreneurs". It provides financial education workshops and sessions in schools, with a range of lesson plans and resources for teachers. It also uses microfinance schemes to help young people save and borrow money.

The company has been cited as providing opportunities for young people to play an active role in society. Based in Brick Lane, its direct delivery approach has reached 46,000 young people in 240 secondary schools and youth organisations.

MyBnk has won praise for its collaborate style, bringing together several professions and young people to create programmes that have won several awards, including 2010's Children and Young People Now Financial Capability prize.

In 2012 they won a Centre for Social Justice award for work preventing poverty.
