= Jeroo =

Educational tool for learning object-oriented programming

- Release: 2002; 24 years ago
- Stable release: 2.5 (stand-alone version)
- Written in: OCaml, TypeScript
- Middleware: Angular
- Platform: Web (web-based version); Java (stand-alone version)
- Type: Educational software
- License: GNU AGPL
- Website: www.jeroo.org
- Repository: gitlab.com/unomaha/jeroo

Jeroo is a cross-platform educational tool for learning object-oriented programming concepts. In particular, the program helps learning concepts such as objects, methods and basic control structures. Jeroo supports three syntactic styles: Java/C#/JavaScript, Python, and Visual Basic.

The program features a GUI split in two sub-windows. In the first sub-window, the user can type code to be executed in the Jeroo environment. In the second sub-window, the user can see the effects of their code in a graphical environment. The second sub-window shows an island populated by Jeroos. The user can instruct the Jeroos, via programming in the first sub-window, to accomplish various actions such as moving, eating or picking up flowers.

The tool received a NEEDS "Premier Award Winner Associate Editor's Choice" in 2004.

Jeroo uses many different methods to engage its students such as storytelling and animating execution. The program has been looked at as a very useful and efficient tool to develop experience and knowledge in computer programming. There have also been many computer science competitions involving the Jeroo program and its features.

== Commands ==
A Jeroo can do a slew of things such as:

Action	Code	Extra info
hop	hop(n);	When n is an integer greater than 0, this moves the Jeroo n spaces forward. If n is not provided, this function defaults to 1 square forward.
pick	pick();	Picks a flower from the Jeroo's location.
plant	plant();	Plants a flower at the Jeroo's location.
turn	turn();	This can turn the Jeroo left or right. turn(LEFT); or turn(RIGHT);
toss	toss();	This makes the Jeroo toss a flower to the space in front of it, disabling a net.
give	give(relative_direction);	This makes a Jeroo hand off a flower to another Jeroo. The "giver" or provided direction (relative_direction) must face the recipient, but the receiver may face any direction.

Jeroos also have certain attributes readable using methods.

== Contributors ==
=== Web-based Jeroo (2019-present) ===
- Ben Konz
- Caelan Bryan
- Thomas Connole
- John Adam
- Brian Dorn

=== Stand-alone Jeroo (2002–2019) ===
- Brian Dorn
- Dean Sanders

=== Artwork used in both web-based Jeroo and stand-alone Jeroo ===
- Christina Shell

== See also ==
- List of educational programming languages
