= Financial Literacy and Education Commission =

US agency

The Financial Literacy and Education Commission (the Commission) was established under Title V, the Financial Literacy and Education Improvement Act which was part of the Fair and Accurate Credit Transactions Act (FACT) Act of 2003, to improve financial literacy and education of persons in the United States. The FACT Act named the Secretary of the Treasury as head of the Commission and required 20 other federal agencies and bureaus to participate in the Commission. The Commission coordinates the financial education efforts throughout the federal government, supports the promotion of financial literacy by the private sector while also encouraging the synchronization of efforts between the public and private sectors.

== National strategy ==
Taking Ownership of the Future: The National Strategy for Financial Literacy is a comprehensive blueprint for improving financial literacy in America, published by the Commission. This national strategy covers 13 areas of financial education and contains 26 specific calls to action.

== Members ==
Member departments and agencies include:

- Board of Governors of the Federal Reserve System
- Commodity Futures Trading Commission
- Federal Deposit Insurance Corporation
- Federal Trade Commission
- National Credit Union Administration
- Office of the Comptroller of the Currency
- Office of Thrift Supervision
- Small Business Administration
- Social Security Administration
- U.S. Department of Agriculture
- U.S. Department of Defense
- U.S. Department of Education
- U.S. General Services Administration
- U.S. Department of Health and Human Services
- U.S. Department of Housing and Urban Development
- U.S. Department of Labor
- United States Office of Personnel Management
- U.S. Department of the Treasury
- U.S. Department of Veterans Affairs
- U.S. Securities and Exchange Commission

== See also ==
- Personal finance
