= Karamoja Regional Museum =

Public museum in Uganda

Coordinates: 2°31′17″N 34°41′04″E

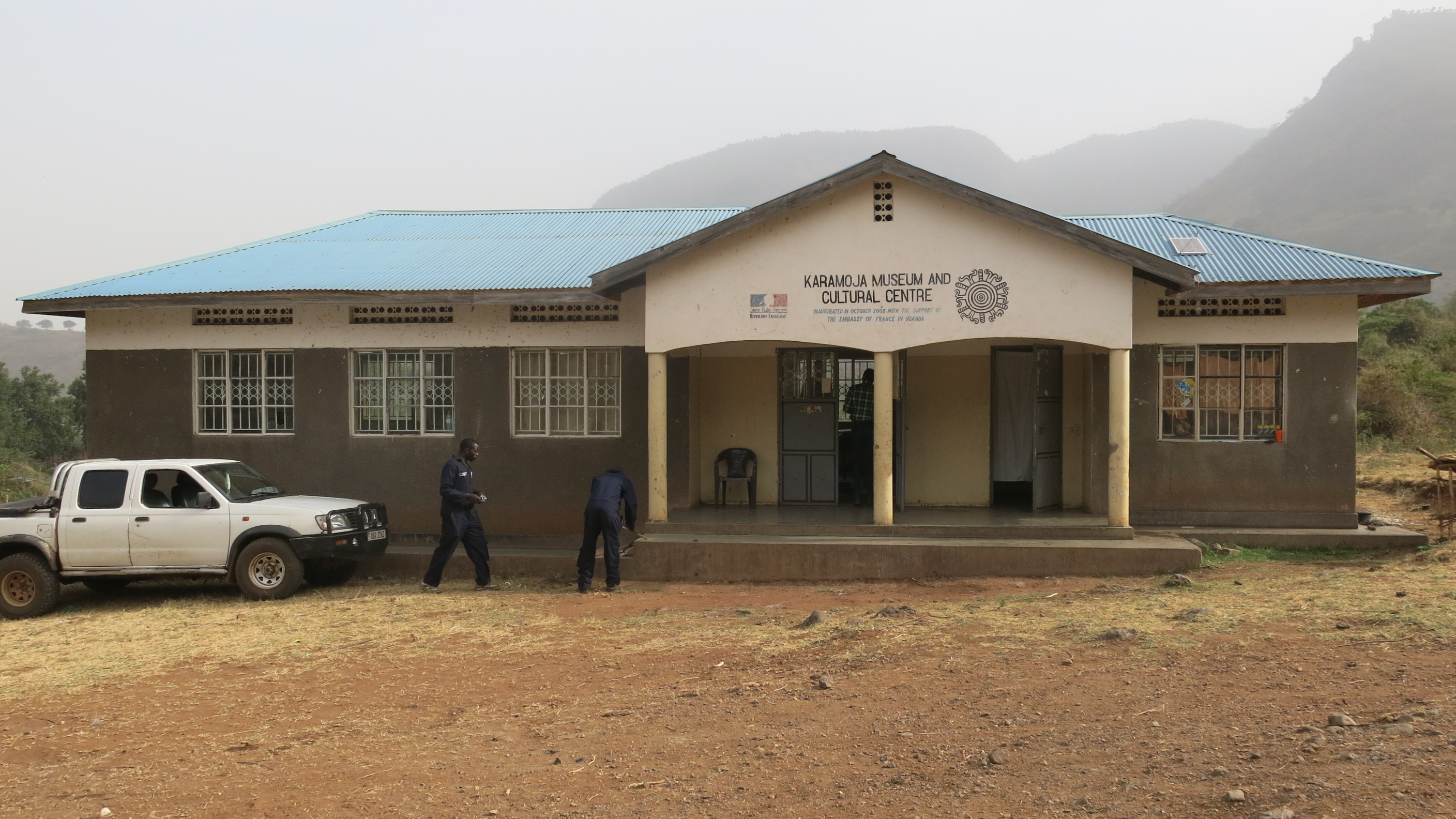
Karamoja Regional Museum building

Karamoja Regional Museum is a public museum in Moroto Town run under the Department of Museums and Monuments in the Ministry of Tourism, Wildlife and Antiquities of Uganda. It also serves as a cultural center where cultural heritage in form of objects is showcased for people to access and appreciate the cultural heritage of the Karamoja sub-region.

== History and etymology ==
Its construction was funded by the French Embassy in Uganda under its Co-operation and Cultural Affairs department. It was officially opened in March, 2012. In addition to conservation and education of the region’s paleontology, the museum showcases the past and modern lifestyles of the Karamajong people. It houses material culture (ethnographic collections) and the fossil collections of Karamoja Sub-region. It is one of the regional museums under the Department of Museums and Monuments, Ministry of Tourism Wildlife and Antiquities of Uganda

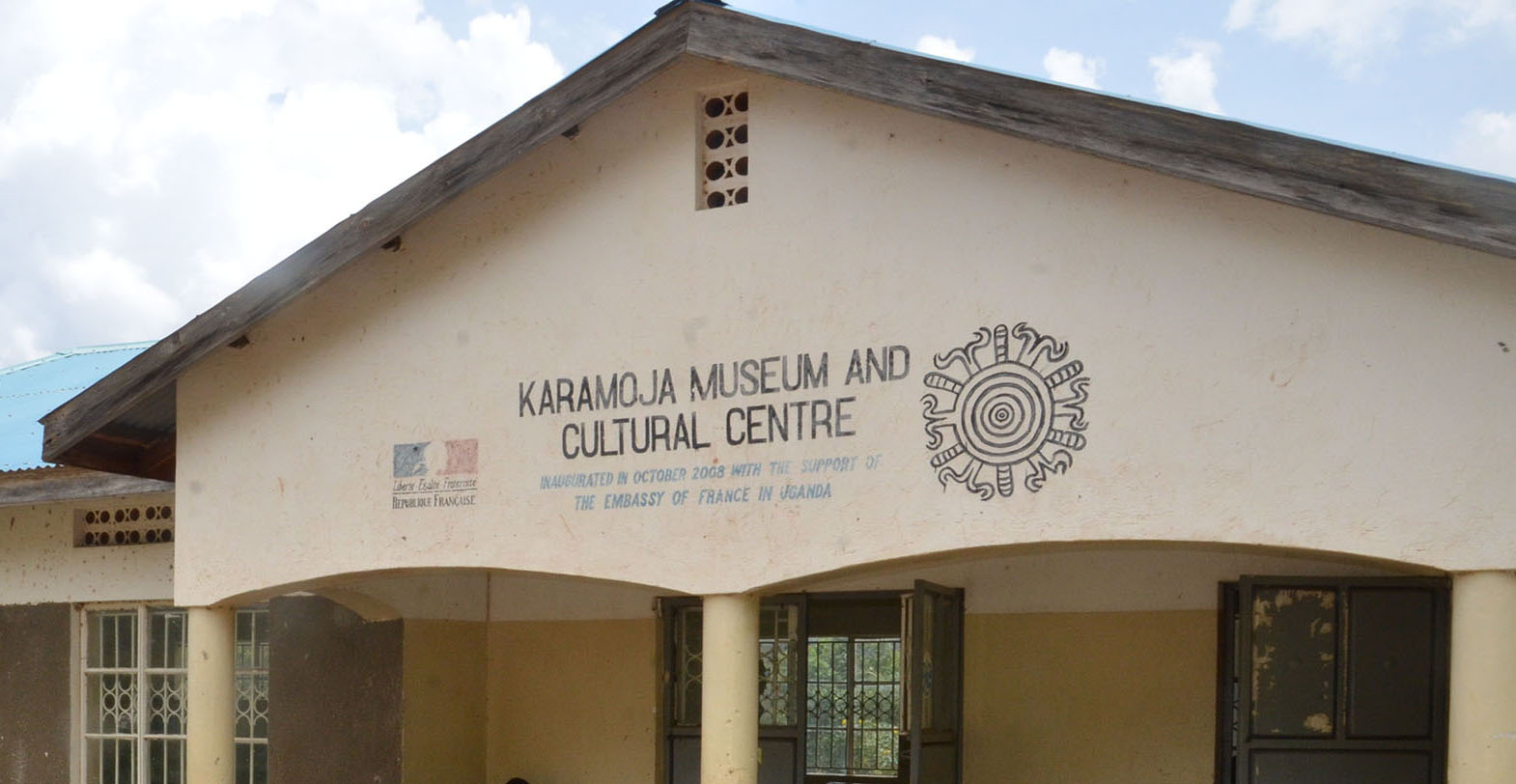
Karamoja Museum.jpg

== Collections ==
The Museum hosts collections illustrating the cultural and ancient natural heritage of Karomoja region in form of ethnographical objects, archaeological artifacts and paleontological fossils such as Afropithecus/Morotopithecus bishop, Morotopithecus Clarki and other large apes of the middle Miocene of Napak. The collection comprises the following displays;

=== Pre-History ===
A selection of fossil materials from Karamoja is on display. Examples of fossils on displays include; plant material such as roots, stems and leaf impressions, pollen and animal material such as teeth, skulls, coprolites (fossilized faeces) among others

=== History of Karamoja ===
The collection displays aspects of colonial and pre-colonial history of Karamoja on displays such as the migrations, famine, warrior life and cattle smuggling, gun warfare and now school. Archaeological materials and information has been gathered about Stone and Iron Age sites such as Magosi Archaeological site and stone tools are displayed as well

=== The People and How They Live ===
The collections display implements of everyday life and memorabilia of past cultural practice portray the traditional life of the Karamojong communities.

=== The Environment ===
Inside the Museum, an exhibit about Karamoja environment displays to the public about the Karamoja wildlife and its environment insects, mammals, birds and fish.

== Activities ==
The Museum offers research and education services for pupils, students and scholars.
