= Kabale Regional Museum =

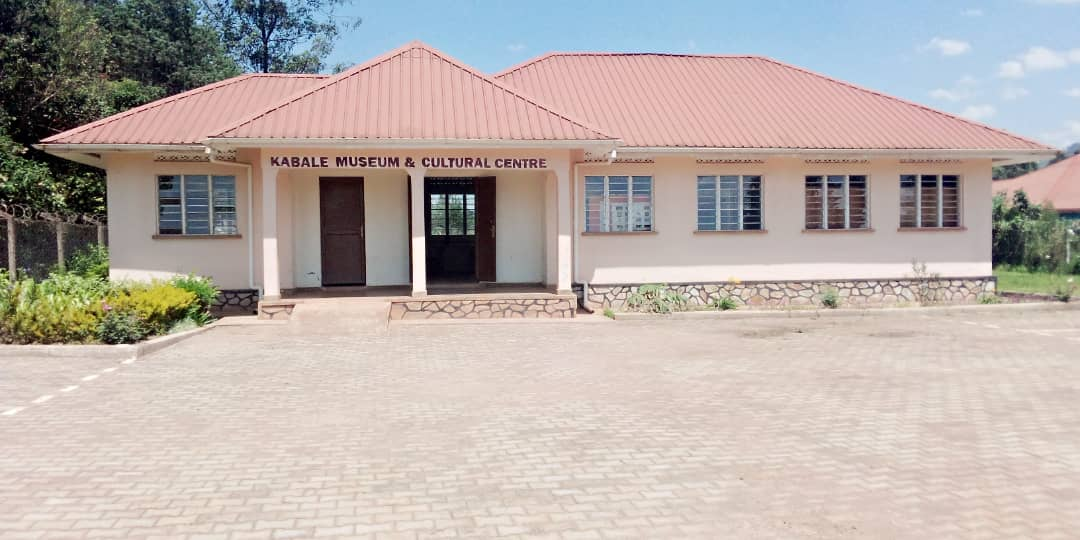
- The Kabale Regional Museum in 2021
- Established: 1978
- Location: Kabale District, Uganda
- Type: Regional museum
- Collections: Ethnography, archaeology, contemporary art

Kabale Regional Museum is a public museum in Kabale Uganda. It is run under the Department of Museums and Monuments in the Ministry of Tourism, Wildlife and Antiquities of Uganda. It is located south of the equator, in the south western Uganda, Kabale District, Northern Division Sub-county, Rutooma Parish, Ibumba Cell on Lake Bunyonyi road. The museum tells the story of the tradition of the Kigezi people in Uganda.

== History and etymology ==
It was established in 1978 by the Board of Trustees of the Uganda Museums, Department of Antiquities by then in the Hindu temple after the President Idi Amin Dada expelled the Asians from Uganda, curated by Nkundiye Samuel.

The museum was closed in 2007 after Indians repossessed the building and turned it into a temple. The objects were taken to the Kabale government archive and Uganda Museum for security purposes.

In 2005, land where the museum is currently located was acquired under the leadership of the then Commissioner of Museums and Monuments, Kamuhangire Ephraim. In 2007, construction of the building started under the leadership of Commissioner Mwanja Nkaale Rose.

Kabale Regional Museum was re-opened to the public in September 2014.

== Collection ==
Kabale Regional Museum covers archaeology, ethnography and contemporary art. It has hundreds of ethnographic collections with very few archeology, geology, painting and photograph collections.

The Museum showcases basic information about Kigezi.

The topics in this Museum include;

- Historical background: How Kigezi came into existence, migrations of inhabitants, Evolution of boundaries and current area of Kigezi.
- Landscape and weather The hills, valleys, forests and how they are economically being utilized by the people, their cultural history, economic and political history.
- The peoples’ origin: Ethnic groupings and the way they live.
- Cultural History: Set ups, ceremonies, marriage, food and drinks, music and dance.
- Economic: Agriculture, Trade, Transport and industries.
- Politics: Early settlements and past events in the greater Kigezi.

The museum showcases artifacts that are endangered objects in the greater Kigezi community.

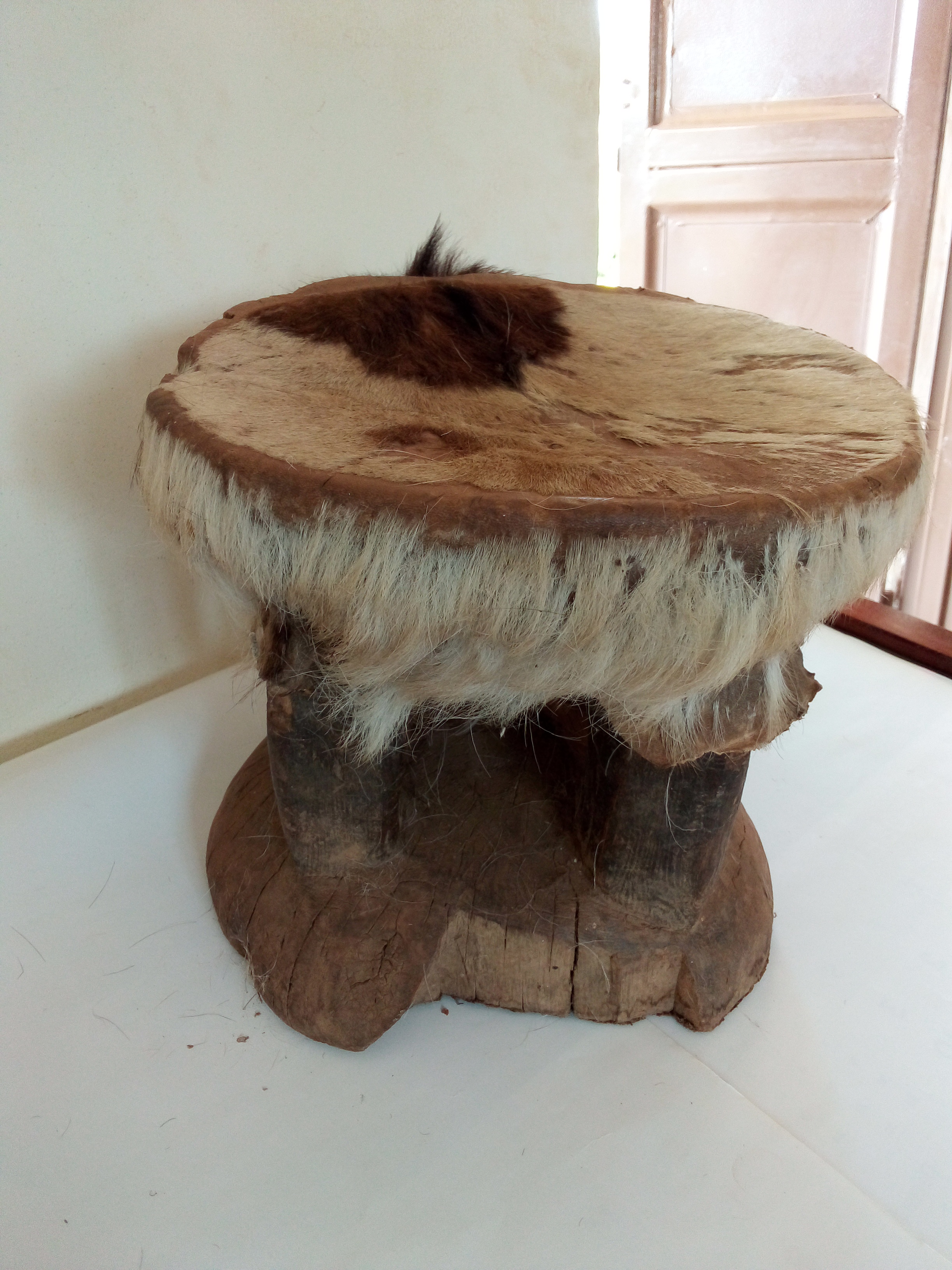
Kikiga stool at Kabale Regional Museum

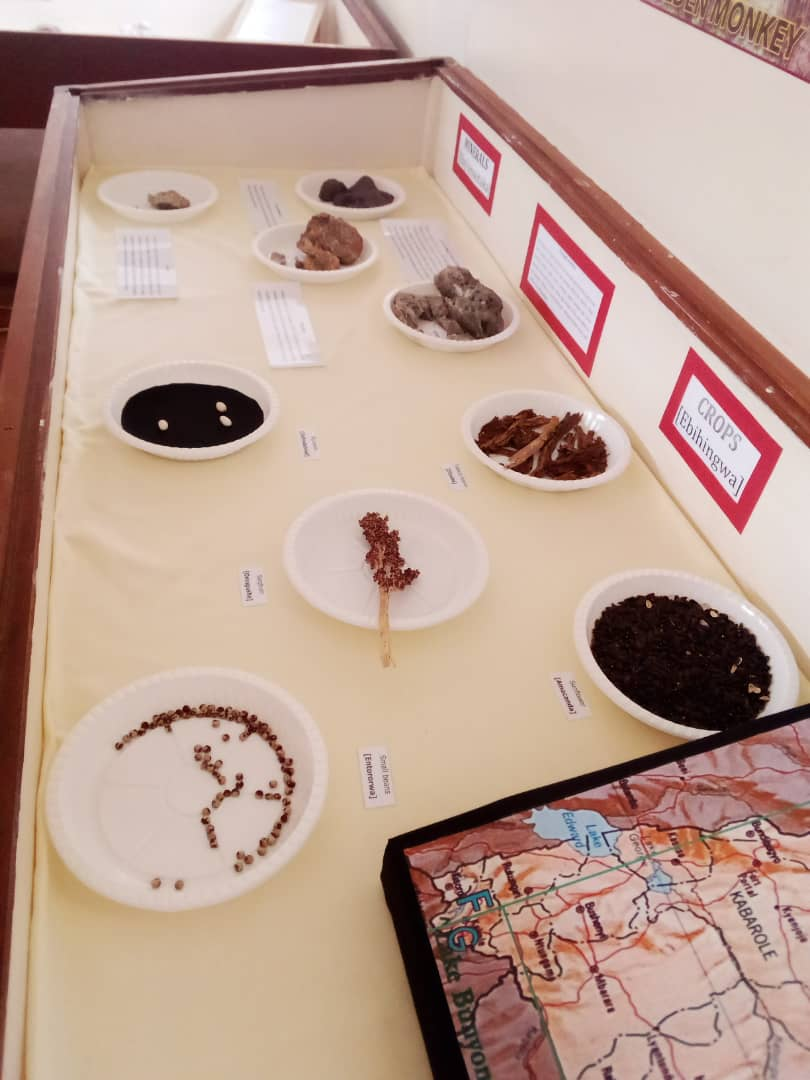
Kabale Regional Museum showcase
