= Somany Ceramics =

Indian company that manufactures ceramic tiles and allied products

Somany Ceramics is an Indian company that manufactures ceramic tiles and allied products.

== History ==
The company was founded in 1968 as Somany Pilkington's Ltd (SPL) by Shri H L Somany and later renamed to Somany Ceramics in 1971 after the family purchased PTP's stake in SPL. Its first production unit was set up in Kassar, Haryana and commenced production in 1971. In 1981, the company established its second plant in Kadi, Gujarat. In 1995, Somany Ceramics was listed on the Bombay Stock Exchange.

In 2019, the company announced bollywood actor Salman Khan as its brand ambassador. In 2020, the company forayed into water heater segment. In February 2023, Somany Ceramics collaborated with Murarka Group to setup a manufacturing facility in Nepal. The current CEO of the company is Abhishek Somany. Currently, the company has a manufacturing capacity of 75 million sq-mtr annually and exports to over 80 countries across 6 continents.

== Research and development ==
In 1996, the company was recognized by the Government of India for its research and development department. In 1998, it became the first tile company to receive ISO 9002 certification before receiving ISO 14001 certification in 1999 for environment-friendly facilities.
