= Financial literacy =

Ability to make informed choices about money

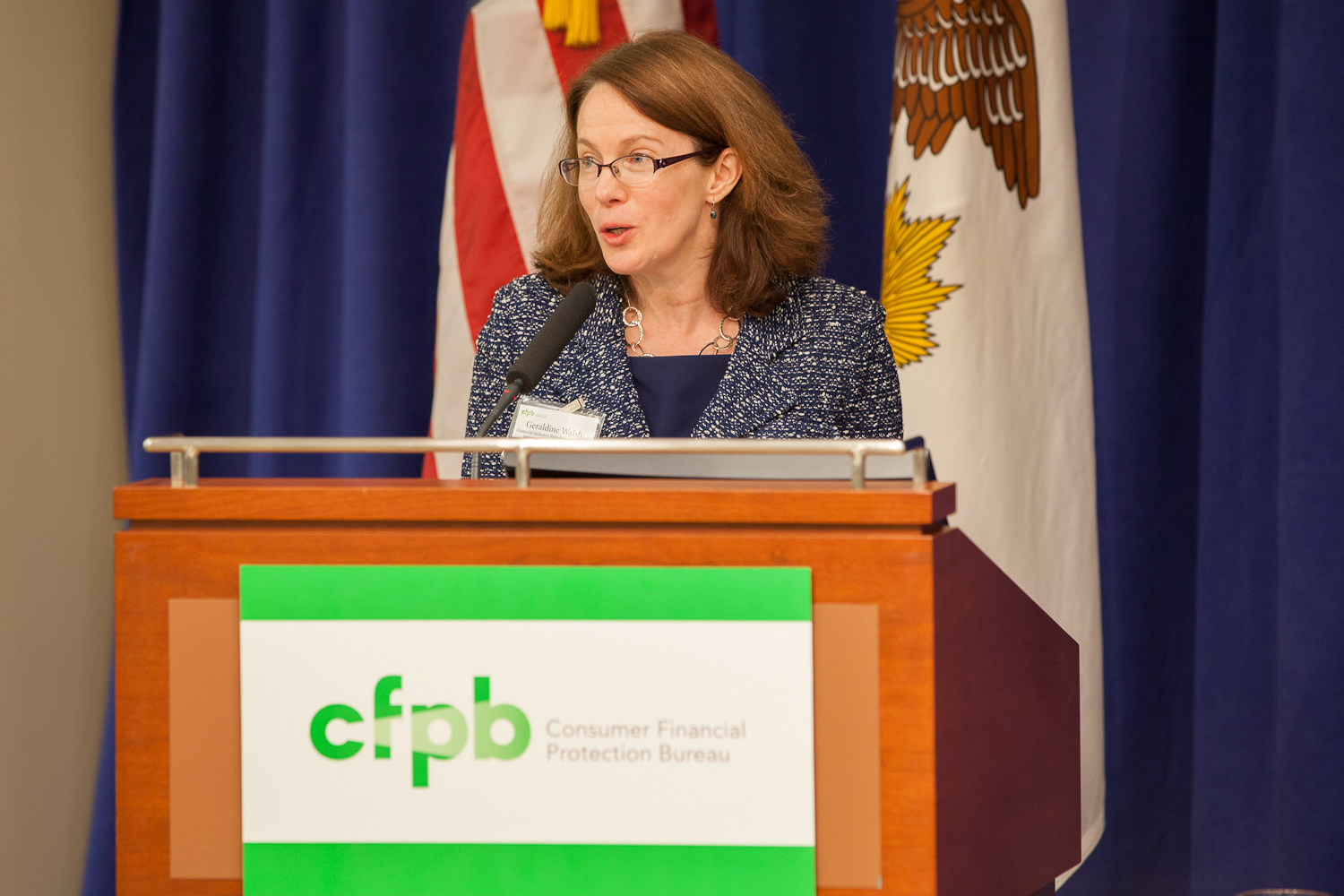
CFPB board

Financial literacy is the possession of skills, knowledge, behavior, and attitude that allow an individual to make informed decisions regarding money. Financial literacy, financial education, and financial knowledge are used interchangeably. Financially unsophisticated individuals cannot plan for their future because of their poor financial knowledge. Financially sophisticated individuals are good at financial calculations; for example they understand compound interest, which helps them to engage in low-credit borrowing. Most of the time, unsophisticated individuals pay high costs for their debt borrowing.

Organization for Economic Co-operation and Development

Raising interest in personal finance is now a focus of state-run programs in Australia, Canada, Japan, the United Kingdom, and the United States. Understanding basic financial concepts allows people to know how to navigate the financial system. People with appropriate financial literacy training make better financial decisions and manage money than those without such training.

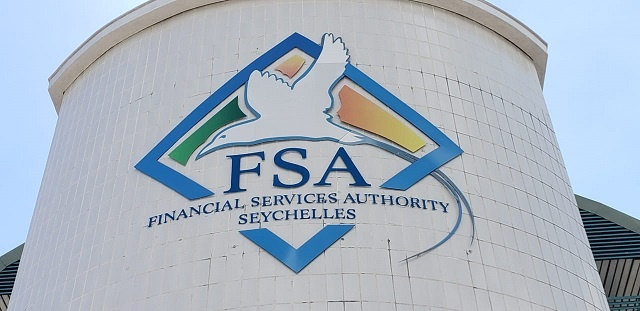
Financial Services Authority

The Organization for Economic Co-operation and Development (OECD) started an inter-governmental project in 2003 to provide ways to improve financial education and literacy standards through the development of common financial literacy principles. In March 2008, the OECD launched the International Gateway for Financial Education, which aims to serve as a clearinghouse for financial education programs, information, and research worldwide. In the UK, the alternative term "financial capability" is used by the state and its agencies: the Financial Services Authority (FSA) in the UK started a national strategy on financial capability in 2003. The US government established its Financial Literacy and Education Commission in 2003.

== Definitions of financial literacy ==
There is a diversity of definitions used by bodies such as NGOs and think tanks, but in its broadest sense, financial literacy is an understanding of money. Some of the definitions below are closely aligned with "skills and knowledge", whereas others take broader views, and some are from academic research which is tested and validated:

- Effectively taking decisions about money management and ability to make informed decisions is called financial literacy.
- To survive in modern society individuals need to have knowledge about financial literacy.
- Ability to use financial concepts in daily life and make optimal financial decisions is called financial literacy.
- Financial literacy is an ability to effectively manage the economic well-being of individuals with knowledge and financial skills.
- The Government Accountability Office definition (2010) is "the ability to make informed judgments and to take effective actions regarding the current and future use and management of money. It includes the challenges associated with life events such as a job loss, saving for retirement, or paying for a child's education."
- The Financial Literacy and Education Commission (2020) includes a notion of personal capability in its definition as "the skills, knowledge and tools that equip people to make individual financial decisions and actions to attain their goals; this may also be known as financial capability, especially when paired with access to financial products and services."
- The National Financial Educators Council adds a psychological component defining financial literacy as "possessing the skills and knowledge on financial matters to confidently take effective action that best fulfills an individual's personal, family and global community goals."
- The OECD's Programme for International Student Assessment (PISA) in 2018 published a definition in two parts. The first part refers to kinds of thinking and behaviour, while the second part refers to the purposes for developing the particular literacy. "Financial literacy is the knowledge and understanding of financial concepts and risks, and the skills, motivation and confidence to apply such knowledge and understanding in order to make effective decisions across a range of financial contexts, to improve the financial well-being of individuals and society, and to enable participation in economic life"
- Financial literacy encompasses not only knowledge and skills but also the ability to apply them effectively in real-world situations, making informed financial decisions that align with one's goals and values.

== Academic research ==
=== Measurement ===
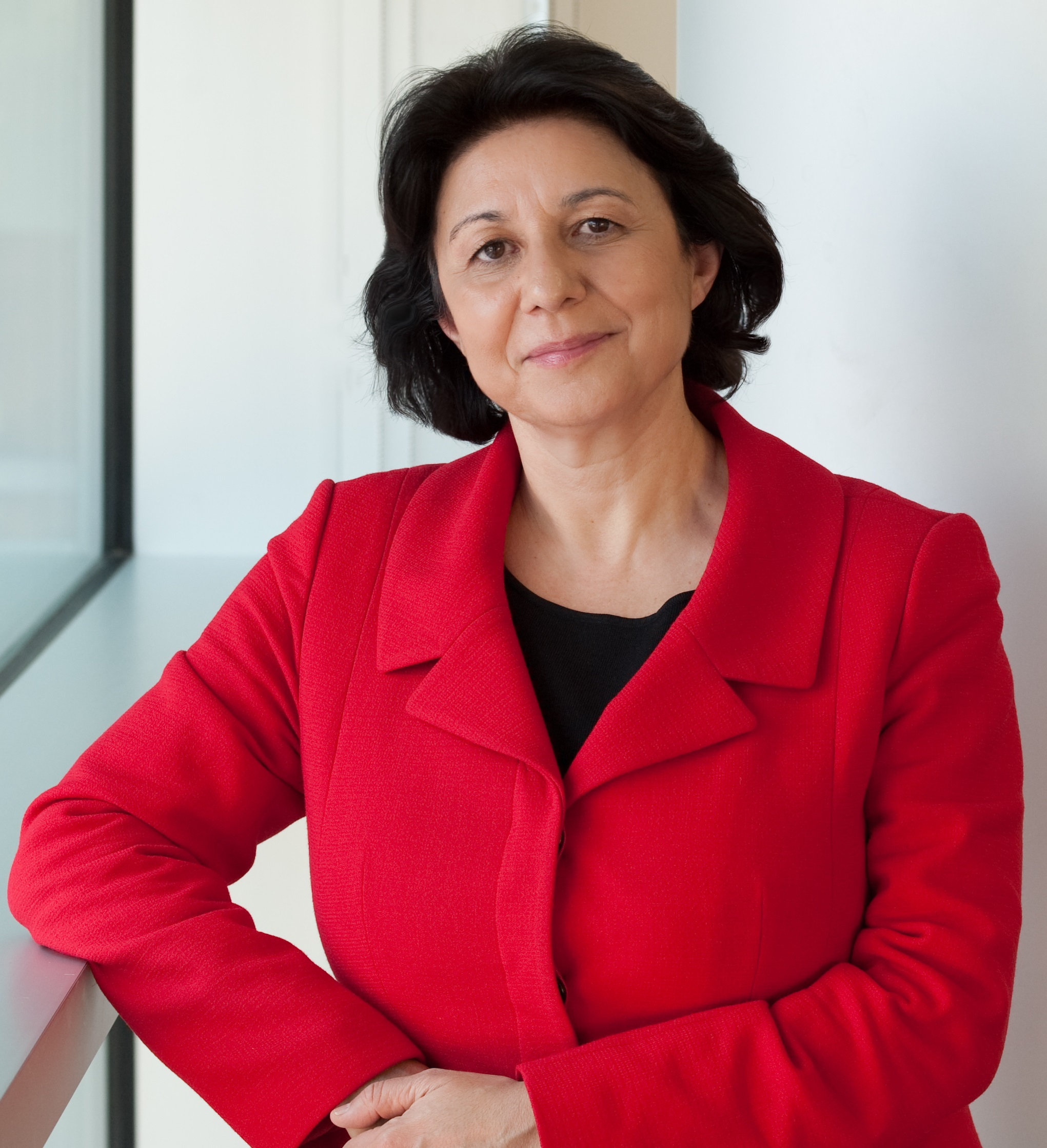
Dr. Annamaria Lusardi of the George Washington University in 2013

Financial literacy in personal financial planning can be defined as objectively measured financial literacy or as subjectively measured financial literacy.

Objectively measured literacy is mainly about the numerical understanding of concepts such as compound interest, portfolio investment, diversification benefits, and the impact of inflation on financial decisions. Objective financial literacy has been measured with five 5-item tests, which include questions related to interest rates, saving accounts, and inflation. Out of five questions, people who tend to answer three questions correctly counted as low financial literacy.

Subjective financial literacy can be defined as the self-perception of individuals about their financial literacy. Lusardi and Mitchell (2014) identified that people rate their subjective financial literacy higher than objective financial literacy because of their behavioral biases when judging their financial knowledge subjectively. People often misestimate their financial knowledge.

=== Stock market participation ===
A study using the household survey of the Dutch central bank found that many respondents did not know the difference between stocks and bonds or the basics of risk diversification, and that people with low financial literacy were significantly less likely to invest in stocks.

=== Critical financial literacy ===
Some financial literacy researchers have raised political questions about the character of financial literacy education, arguing that it justifies the return of greater financial risk (e.g. tuition fees, pensions, health care costs, etc.) from corporations and governments back to individuals. Many of these researchers argue for a financial literacy education that is more critically oriented and broader in focus: an education that helps individuals better understand systemic injustice and social exclusion, rather than one that understands financial failure as an individual problem and the character of financial risk as apolitical. Many researchers work within social justice, critical pedagogy, feminist and critical race theory paradigms.

=== Journal of Financial Literacy and Wellbeing ===
The Journal of Financial Literacy and Wellbeing, published by Cambridge University Press, is an open-access academic journal established in April 2023. It publishes rigorous research on financial literacy and financial well-being. It aims to inform public policies as public, private and civil society strategies and activities, with the ultimate objective of improving the financial literacy, resilience, and well-being of individuals and micro and small entrepreneurs. This journal covers the topics including financial knowledge, financial attitudes and skills. This journal also includes research on related fields like financial well-being. The journal is co-edited by Annamaria Lusardi (Stanford University) and Flore-Anne Messy (OECD). It is a gold open-access journal that publishes three issues per year and explicitly aims to inform public policy as well as private- and civil-society strategies.

=== Accounting literacy ===
Accounting literacy refers to the ability to read and analyse the financial statements of a company or individuals and understand the impact of financial decisions. This can be helpful for investors, managers, and individuals. Accounting literacy can be combined with financial planning, tax planning and understanding the financial health of the company.

Academic researchers have explored the relationship between financial literacy and accounting literacy. Roman L. Weil defines financial literacy as "the ability to understand the important accounting judgments management makes, why management makes them, and how management can use those judgments to manipulate financial statements".

The 1999 Blue Ribbon Committee on Improving the Effectiveness of Corporate Audit Committees recommended that publicly traded companies have at least three members with "a certain basic 'financial literacy'. Such 'literacy' signifies the ability to read and understand fundamental financial statements, including a company's balance sheet, income statement and cash flow statement."

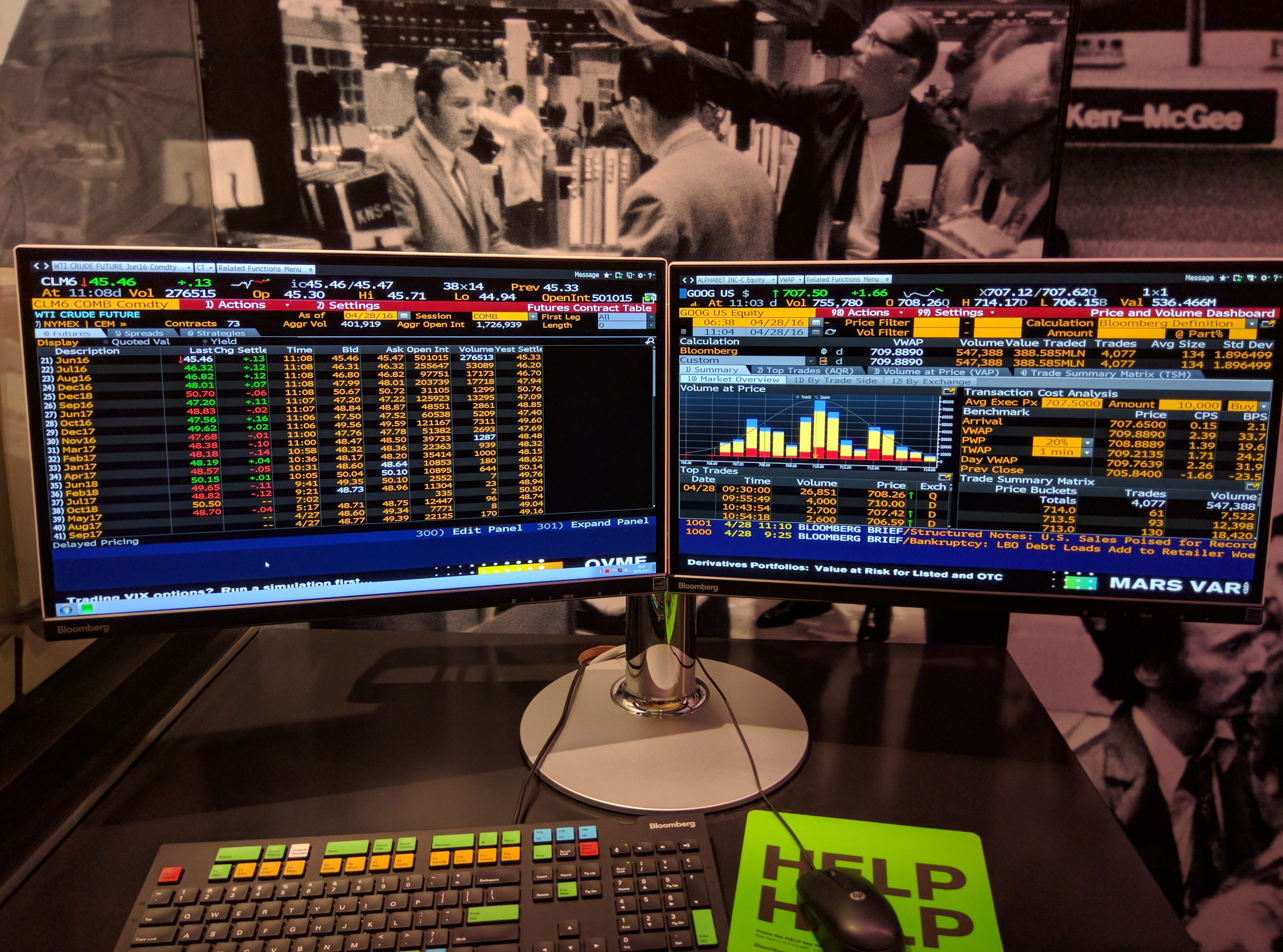
Fintech

=== Digital financial literacy ===
Digital financial literacy is all about the combination of Fintech and financial literacy. Digital Financial Literacy combines objective financial knowledge with four dimensions of digital literacy including digital knowledge, awareness of digital financial services, tacit knowledge of using digital financial services, and the ability to avoid digital fraud. Digital Financial Literacy is the ability of individuals to use digital devices to make financial decisions. There is a need for digital financial literacy across all consumers because of increasing fraud victimization due to digitalization, which prone individuals to misinformed financial decisions.

== International findings ==
The OECD/INFE 2023 International Survey of Adult Financial Literacy, covering 39 countries and economies (including 20 OECD members) and more than 68,000 adults aged 18-79, found an average financial literacy score of 60 out of 100 across all participating countries and economies (63 out of 100 among participating OECD countries). Only 34% of adults reached the minimum target score of 70 out of 100. The average digital financial literacy score was 53 out of 100 (55 among OECD participants), and the average financial well-being score was 42 out of 100 (47 among OECD participants). While 84% of adults understood the definition of inflation, only 42% correctly answered a compound-interest question.

A 2005 OECD study analysing financial literacy surveys in OECD countries. A selection of findings included:

- In Australia, 67 percent of respondents indicated that they understood the concept of compound interest, yet when asked to solve a problem using the concept, only 28% had a good understanding.
- A British survey found that consumers do not actively seek out financial information. The information they receive is acquired by chance, for example, by picking up a pamphlet at a bank or having a chance talk with a bank employee.
- A Canadian survey found that respondents considered choosing the right investments more stressful than going to the dentist.
- A survey of Korean high-school students showed that they had failing scores—that is, they answered fewer than 60 percent of the questions correctly—on tests designed to measure their ability to choose and manage a credit card, their knowledge about saving and investing for retirement, and their awareness of risk and the importance of insuring against it.
- A survey in the US found that four out of ten American workers need to be saving for retirement.

"Yet it is encouraging that the few financial education programmes which have been evaluated are reasonably effective. Research in the US shows that workers increase their participation in 401(k) plans (a type of retirement plan, with special tax advantages, which allows employees to save and invest for their retirement) when employers offer financial education programmes, whether in the form of brochures or seminars."

According to a 2022 meta-analysis of 76 randomized experiments involving more than 160,000 individuals conducted by Kaiser et al., financial education programs have, on average, positive causal effects on both financial knowledge and downstream financial behaviors. The effects are economically meaningful and comparable in size to educational interventions in other domains; they are at least three times (and in some specifications more than five times) as large as those reported in an earlier, smaller meta-analysis. Effects on knowledge are generally larger than effects on behavior, and intensity of treatment matters.

According to the 2014 Asian Development Bank survey, more Mongolians have expanded their financial options, and for instance now compare the interest rates of loans and savings services through the successful launch of the TV drama with a focus on the fiscal literacy of poor and non-poor vulnerable households. Given that 80% of Mongolians cited TV as their main source of information, TV serial dramas were identified as the most effective vehicle for messages on financial literacy.

=== Student financial literacy (PISA) ===
The OECD’s Programme for International Student Assessment (PISA) 2022 financial literacy assessment (the fourth such assessment), covered nearly 100,000 15-year-old students in 20 countries and economies. The mean score across 14 OECD countries and economies was 498 points. On average across OECD participants, 18% of students performed at or below Level 1 (the lowest proficiency level), while 11% were top performers at Level 5. Socio-economically advantaged students scored 87 points higher than disadvantaged students on average. Performance remained broadly stable compared with earlier cycles in countries with trend data.

== Asia–Pacific, Middle East, and Africa, North East ==
A survey of women consumers across Asia Pacific Middle East Africa (APMEA) comprises basic money management, financial planning and investment. The top ten of APMEA Women MasterCard's Financial Literacy Index are Thailand 73.9, New Zealand 71.3, Australia 70.2, Vietnam 70.1, Singapore 69.4, Taiwan 68.7, Philippines 68.2, Hong Kong 68.0, Indonesia 66.5 and Malaysia 66.0.

=== Australia ===
The Australian Government established a National Consumer and Financial Literacy Taskforce in 2004, which recommended the establishment of the Financial Literacy Foundation in 2005. In 2008, the functions of the Foundation were transferred to the Australian Securities and Investments Commission (ASIC). The Australian Government also runs a range of programs (such as Money Management) to improve the financial literacy of its Indigenous population, particularly those living in remote communities.

In 2011 ASIC released a National Financial Literacy Strategy—informed by an earlier ASIC research report 'Financial Literacy and Behavioural Change'—to enhance the financial well-being of all Australians by improving financial literacy levels. The strategy has four pillars:

1. Education
2. Trusted and independent information, tools and support
3. Additional solutions to drive improved financial well-being and behavioural change.
4. Partnerships with the sectors involved with financial literacy, measuring its impact and promoting best practice.

ASIC's MoneySmart website was one of the key initiatives in the government's strategy. It replaced the FIDO and Understanding Money websites.

ASIC also has a MoneySmart Teaching website for teachers and educators. It provides professional learning and other resources to help educators integrate consumer and financial literacy into teaching and learning programs.

The Know Risk Network of web and phone apps, newsletters, videos, and websites was developed by the insurance membership body ANZIIF to educate consumers on insurance and risk management.

=== Ethiopia ===
The National Bank of Ethiopia (NBE) coordinates financial education under the National Financial Education Strategy 2021-2025, which targets 75% of adults having knowledge of financial products and services by 2025. The strategy addresses low baseline levels identified in earlier World Bank and other surveys, with particular gaps between rural and urban populations and between men and women. Implementation involves financial institutions, federal and regional governments, and development partners, with a focus on rural women, youth, and MSMEs.

Key actions include the launch of a standardized national Financial Education Module for Youth, Women, and MSMEs (developed with the Mastercard Foundation and First Consult under the BRIDGES program). The module covers savings, digital banking, lending, insurance, interest-free finance, business planning, budgeting, bookkeeping, risk management, and related topics. The NBE also organizes the Annual Financial Literacy Week (first held in 2025 under the theme “Fostering Financial Literacy and Strengthening Consumer Protection”), which targets digital literacy and rural women and aims to reach millions of adults with mobile-money education.

A 2024 UNCDF Digital and Financial Literacy Survey of 1,500 adults found relatively stronger performance on basic financial competencies and digital financial competencies than on digitalization outcomes. Respondents showed high recognition of inflation (92%) and risk-return concepts, but weaker understanding of compound interest and certain products; digital safety practices (password reuse, device protection) remained limited.

=== India ===
National Centre for Financial Education (NCFE), a non-profit company, was created under section 8 of Companies Act 2013, to promote financial literacy in India. It is promoted by four major financial regulators, Reserve Bank of India, SEBI, IRDA and PFRDA.

NCFE conducted a benchmark financial literacy survey in 2015 to find the level of financial awareness in India. This was followed by another survey conducted by NCFE in 2019. It organises various programs to improve financial literacy including collaborating with schools and developing new curriculum to include financial management concepts. It also conducts a yearly financial literacy test. The topics NCFE covers in its awareness programs include investments, types of bank accounts, services offered by banks, Aadhaar cards, demat accounts, pan cards, power of compounding, digital payments, protection against financial frauds etc.

=== Japan ===
Japan embedded financial education in the national school curriculum from elementary through high school beginning in April 2022. Younger students learn basic concepts such as the role of money and needs versus wants; older students cover cashless payments, financial products, and long-term planning. The Japan Financial Literacy and Education Corporation (J-FLEC), established as a government-authorized corporation in 2024 and fully operational from August 2024, coordinates as the central public-private body to promote financial and economic education. It provides teaching materials, certified instructors, teacher training, free lecturer dispatch to schools and workplaces, and individual consultation services (including subsidized “first money-plan” sessions).

J-FLEC’s mandate supports the government’s goal of raising the share of the population that reports having received financial education (from roughly 7% toward higher targets aligned with international benchmarks). Private initiatives, including family-oriented programs and industry efforts on cashless payments, complement the public framework.

=== Saudi Arabia ===
A nationwide survey was conducted by SEDCO Holding in Saudi Arabia in 2012 to understand the youth's financial literacy level. The survey involved a thousand young Saudi nationals, and the results showed that only 11 percent kept track of their spending, although 75 percent thought they understood the basics of money management. An in-depth analysis of SEDCO's survey revealed that 45 percent of youngsters did not save any money, while only 20 percent saved 10 percent of their monthly income. Regarding spending habits, the study indicated that items such as mobile phones and travel accounted for nearly 80 percent of purchases. Regarding financing their lifestyle, 46 percent of youth relied on their parents to fund big ticket items. 90 percent of the respondents stated they wanted to increase their financial knowledge.

=== Singapore ===
In Singapore, the National Institute of Education Singapore established the inaugural Financial Literacy Hub for Teachers in 2007 to empower school teachers to infuse financial literacy into core curriculum subjects to embed pedagogically sound activities to engage students in learning. Such day-to-day relevant and authentic illustrations enhance the experiential learning to build financial capability in youth. Integral to evidence-based practices in schools, research on financial literacy is spearheaded by the Hub, which has published numerous impact studies on the effectiveness of financial literacy programs and on the perceptions and attitudes of teachers and students.

The Singapore government through the Monetary Authority of Singapore funded the setting up of the Institute for Financial Literacy in July 2012. The institute is managed jointly by MoneySense (a national financial education program) and the Singapore Polytechnic. This Institute aims to build core financial capabilities across a broad spectrum of the Singapore population by providing free and unbiased financial education programs to working adults and their families. From July 2012 to May 2017, the Institute reached out to more than 110,000 people in Singapore via workshops and talks.

=== South Korea ===
South Korea is recognized as one of the top 10 global economies, yet there are varying levels of financial literacy among its citizens. According to a 2021 survey conducted by the Ministry of Economy and Finance, the average financial literacy score in South Korea was 56.3 out of 100.

=== United Arab Emirates ===
The Central Bank of the UAE developed the UAE National Financial Inclusion Strategy 2026-2030 in partnership with the World Bank, the OECD and the Arab Monetary Fund, drawing on input from more than 70 national stakeholders. The strategy covers financial literacy, digital transformation, legislative frameworks, data tools including a National Financial Wellbeing Index, and improved access for women, youth, people of determination, entrepreneurs and MSMEs. A related National Financial Literacy Strategy was prepared alongside it.

School-based programs include Dubai’s Skills for Life initiative, launched by the Knowledge and Human Development Authority for the 2026-27 academic year and incorporating financial and consumer literacy, and the Young Investor Program, which offers modules on money management, savings, investments and insurance and has been expanded to reach tens of thousands of students in private schools. Banks such as Abu Dhabi Islamic Bank provide free sessions on budgeting, investment, entrepreneurship and fraud awareness for participants from childhood to pre-retirement age.

The UAE took part in the PISA 2022 financial literacy assessment for the first time. Students scored an average of 441 points, below the OECD average of 498; about 39% performed at or below Level 1 and 7% reached Level 5. The UAE recorded the highest score among Arab countries in the assessment.

== Europe ==
According to a 2023 EU study, 18% of EU citizens display a high level of financial literacy, 64% a medium level, and the remaining 18% a low level. The differences between member states of the EU are significant. Only in the Netherlands, Sweden, Denmark and Slovenia over a quarter of the citizens score highly in financial literacy.

=== France ===
In 2016, France introduced a national economic, budgetary and financial education (EDUFI) strategy based on OECD principles. The government designated the Banque de France as the national operator in charge of implementing the policy.

This government-led strategy aims to promote financial literacy in French society. Measures include financial education and budget planning courses for young people. Entrepreneurs and financially vulnerable individuals also receive support to develop skills.

The Banque de France conducts periodic surveys on the level of understanding, attitudes and behaviour of the French population regarding budgetary and financial matters. It also raises awareness on topics such as over-indebtedness, bank inclusion schemes, means of payment, bank accounts, credit, savings and insurance.

The Cité de l'Économie opened to the public in June 2019. This institution is the first French museum dedicated entirely to fostering economic literacy in an instructive and entertaining way. The Banque de France funds it in cooperation with several partners, including the Ministry for Education, the Institut pour l'Éducation Financière du Public (IEFP – Institute for Public Financial Education) and the Bibliothèque Nationale de France.

=== Belgium ===
The FSMA is tasked with contributing to better financial literacy of savers and investors enabling individual savers, insured persons, shareholders and investors in Belgium to be in a better position in their relationships with their financial institutions. As a result, they will be less likely to purchase products unsuited to their profile.

=== Switzerland ===
A study measured financial literacy among 1,500 households in German-speaking Switzerland. Testing the three concepts compound interest, inflation, and risk diversification, results show that the level of financial literacy in Switzerland is high compared to results for other European countries or the US population. Results of the study further show that higher financial literacy is correlated with financial market participation and mortgage borrowing. A related study among 15-year-old students in the Canton of Fribourg shows substantial differences in financial literacy between French- and German-speaking students.

The Swiss National Bank aims at improving financial literacy through its initiative Iconomix which targets upper secondary school students. The new public school curriculum will cover financial literacy in public schools.

=== United Kingdom ===
The UK’s dedicated body for financial capability and wellbeing is the Money and Pensions Service (MaPS), which succeeded the Money Advice Service. MaPS coordinates the UK Strategy for Financial Wellbeing (a ten-year framework to 2030) and publishes regular population surveys such as MoneyView. Its 2025 - 2028 Strategic Plan focuses on services, collaboration, information and capability-building.

The Financial Services Act 2010 included a provision for the Financial Services Authority (FSA) to establish the Consumer Financial Education Body (CFEB). From April 26, 2010, CFEB continued the work of the FSA's Financial Capability Division independently of the FSA, and on April 4, 2011, was rebranded as the Money Advice Service.

The strategy previously involved the FSA spending about £10 million a year across a seven-point plan. The priority areas were:

- New parents
- Schools (a program being delivered by pfeg)
- Young adults
- Workplace
- Consumer communications
- Online tools
- Money advice

A baseline survey conducted 5,300 interviews across the UK in 2005. The report identified four themes:

- Many people were failing to plan ahead.
- Many people were taking on financial risks without realising it.
- Problems of debt were severe for a small proportion of the population, and many more people may be affected by an economic downturn.
- The under-40s were, on average, less financially capable than their elders.

"In short, unless steps are taken to improve levels of financial capability, we are storing up trouble for the future."

Numerous charities in the United Kingdom also work to improve financial literacy, such as MyBank, Citizens Advice Bureau, and the Personal Finance Education Group.

Financial literacy within the UK's armed forces is provided through the MoneyForce program, run by the Royal British Legion in association with the Ministry of Defence and the Money Advice Service.

== Americas ==
=== Canada ===
In 2006, Canadian securities regulators commissioned two national investor surveys to gauge people's knowledge and experience with investments and fraud. The results from both studies demonstrated that there is a need to better to educate and inform investors about capital markets and investment fraud. Education in this area is particularly important as investors take on more risk and responsibility of managing their retirement savings, and a large baby boomer population enters the retirement years across North America.

In 2005, the British Columbia Securities Commission (BCSC) funded the Eron Mortgage Study. It was the first systematic study of a single investment fraud, focusing on more than 2,200 Eron Mortgage investors. Among other things, the report identified that investors approaching retirement without adequate resources and affluent middle-aged men were vulnerable to investment fraud. The report suggests investor education will become even more important as the baby boomer generation enters retirement.

In Canada, Financial Literacy Month takes place during the month of November to encourage Canadians to take control of their financial well-being and invest into their financial futures by learning about topics of personal finance. Canada has also established a government entity to "promotes financial education and raises consumers' awareness of their rights and responsibilities". The agency also "ensures federally regulated financial entities comply with consumer protection measures. Canada also launched something called the Financial Literacy Strategy for the years 2021-2026, it focuses on building financial resilience after the pandemic with the large increase in digital finance.

=== United States ===
In the US, a national nonprofit organization, the Jump$tart Coalition for Personal Financial Literacy, is a collection of corporate, academic, non-profit and government organizations that work for financial education since 1995.

Another national nonprofit organization in the US, the National Association of Investors (NAIC), has focused their financial literacy efforts specifically on investment education since 1951.

The United States Department of the Treasury established its Office of Financial Education in 2002; and the US Congress established the Financial Literacy and Education Commission under the Financial Literacy and Education Improvement Act in 2003. The Commission published its National Strategy on Financial Literacy in 2006.

While many organizations have supported the financial literacy movement, they may differ on their definitions of financial literacy. In a report by the President's Advisory Council on Financial Literacy, the authors called for a consistent definition of financial literacy by which financial literacy education programs can be judged. They defined financial literacy as "the ability to use knowledge and skills to manage financial resources effectively for a lifetime of financial well-being."

The Council for Economic Education's 2026 Survey of the States reported that 39 states had passed requirements for personal finance coursework as a condition of high school graduation. Thirteen of those states allowed the material to be embedded in another required course rather than taught as a stand-alone course.

The Center For Financial Literacy at Champlain College conducts a biannual survey of statewide high school financial literacy requirements across the nation. Recently, some states have even taken further steps to make some form of financial education a requirement to graduate, which shows a concern for the youth's readiness for adulthood. The 2017 survey found that Utah had the highest state requirement in the nation, while in Alaska, Delaware, Washington, District of Columbia, Hawaii, Rhode Island and South Dakota, students are entirely dependent on the initiative of their local school board.

In July 2010, the United States Congress passed the Dodd-Frank Wall Street Reform and Consumer Protection Act (Dodd-Frank Act), which created the Consumer Financial Protection Bureau (CFPB). The Dodd-Frank Act mandates the Federal Reserve System, through its Office of Minority and Women Inclusion (OMWI), to "where feasible, partnering with inner-city high schools, girls' high schools, and high schools with majority minority populations to establish or enhance financial literacy programs and provide mentoring." The Dodd-Frank Act also tasks CFPB with promoting financial education through its Consumer Engagement & Education group.

=== Brazil ===
Between 2018 and 2019, surveys were performed for a myriad of players in the Brazilian financial market. Among them, B3 (stock exchange), ANBIMA, CVM e Ilumeo Institute. Following these surveys, Brazil defined action plans, the National Strategy about Financial Education (ENEF).

== See also ==
- Financial deepening
- Financial ethics
- Financial inclusion
- Financial literacy curriculum
- Financial Literacy Month
- Financial regulation
- Financial social work
- Fiscal sustainability
- Information literacy
