= Global Money Week =

Annual money awareness celebration

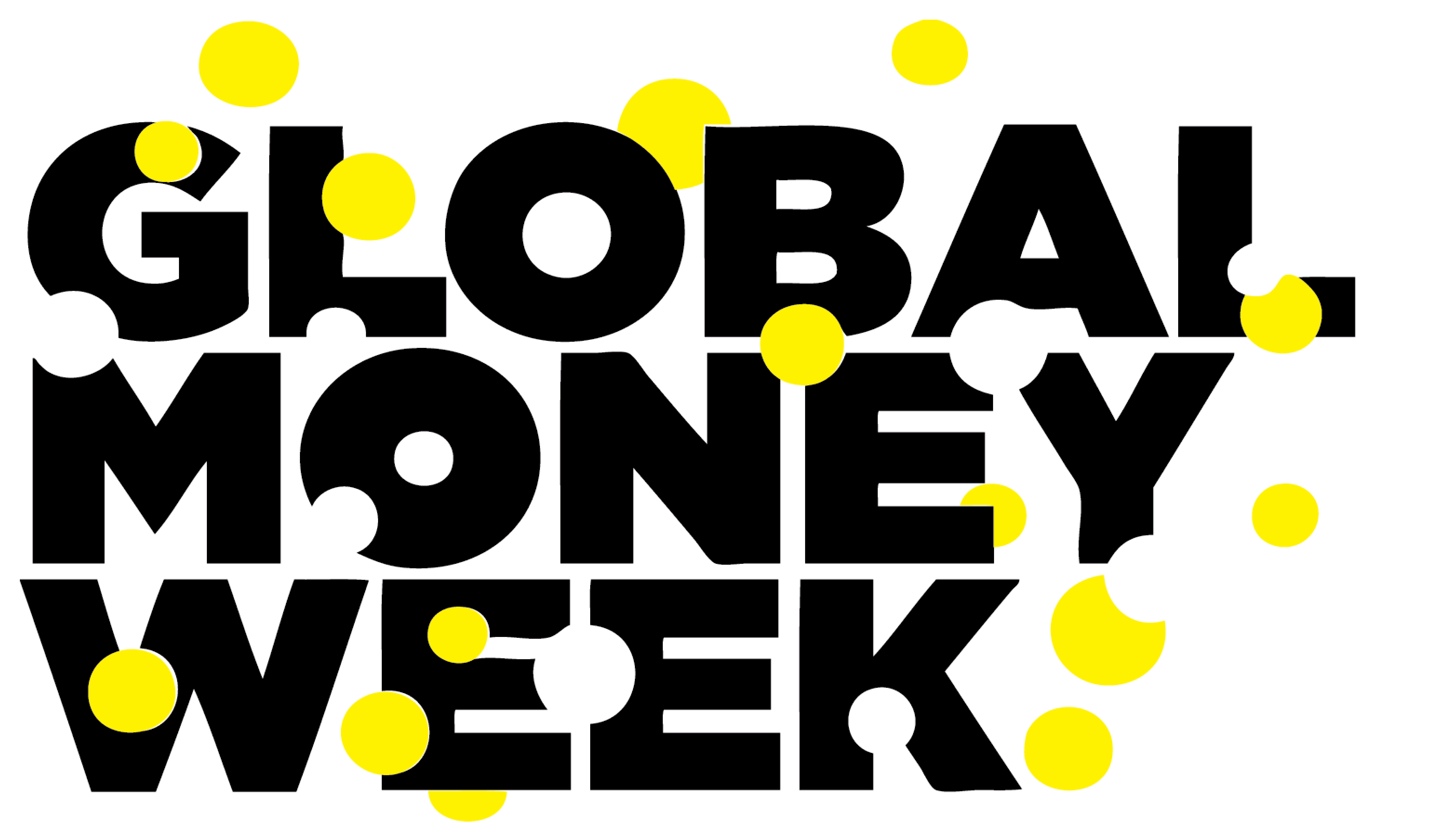
- Observed by: 175 countries
- Date: 22–28 March 2021
- Frequency: Annual
- Related to: www.globalmoneyweek.org

Global Money Week (GMW) is a global money awareness celebration that takes place in March every year. It is coordinated by the Child and Youth Finance International (CYFI) Secretariat to raise awareness on Economic Citizenship and directly engage children and youth worldwide on the issue. The celebration of Global Money Week consists of a series of activities held at the regional, national and local level by the partners and stakeholders of the Child and Youth Finance Movement, and are geared toward engaging children, youth and their communities in learning about financial education and financial inclusion.

According to the Global Money Week website, “GMW is an annual global celebration, initiated by Child & Youth Finance International (CYFI), with local and regional events and activities aimed at inspiring children and youth to learn about money, saving, creating livelihoods, gaining employment and becoming an entrepreneur.”

== History ==
In 2013, GMW involved approximately 1 million children in 80 countries ranging across Europe, the Americas, Africa, Asia and the Middle East. Over 1000 activities were organized by 403 organizations, such as NGOs, central banks, Ministries of Finance, corporations and schools.

GMW 2014 saw the participation of 3 million children, 118 countries, over 2000 activities and 490 organizations involved in the theme of enterprise: among those, central banks, governmental bodies, educational institutions. The 2014 event saw a number of multi-sectoral organizations working together for the first time.

During GMW 2015 the theme was, “Save Today, Safe Tomorrow.” and over 5.6 million children & youth took part in the celebrations in 124 countries.

In 2016, GMW expanded even further, reaching over 7 million children and young people across 132 countries. An ever increasing number of countries and organizations were involved in supporting the millions of young people taking part in money awareness, financial literacy, and entrepreneurship activities during the 2016 Global Money Week celebrations, which focused on the theme 'Take Part, Save Smart'.

The 2017 edition of GMW will take place from 27 March - 2 April, with the theme 'Learn Save Earn':

- Learn: Educating children and young people about their social and economic rights and responsibilities is key to creating a generation of capable adults who can make wise decisions for their future
- Save: It is important for children and youth to build clever savings habits from an early age in order to cultivate key money-managing skills for later in life
- Earn: Developing livelihoods skills or receiving entrepreneurial training supports children and young people with getting a job or building their own business and developing their careers.

== Types of activities ==
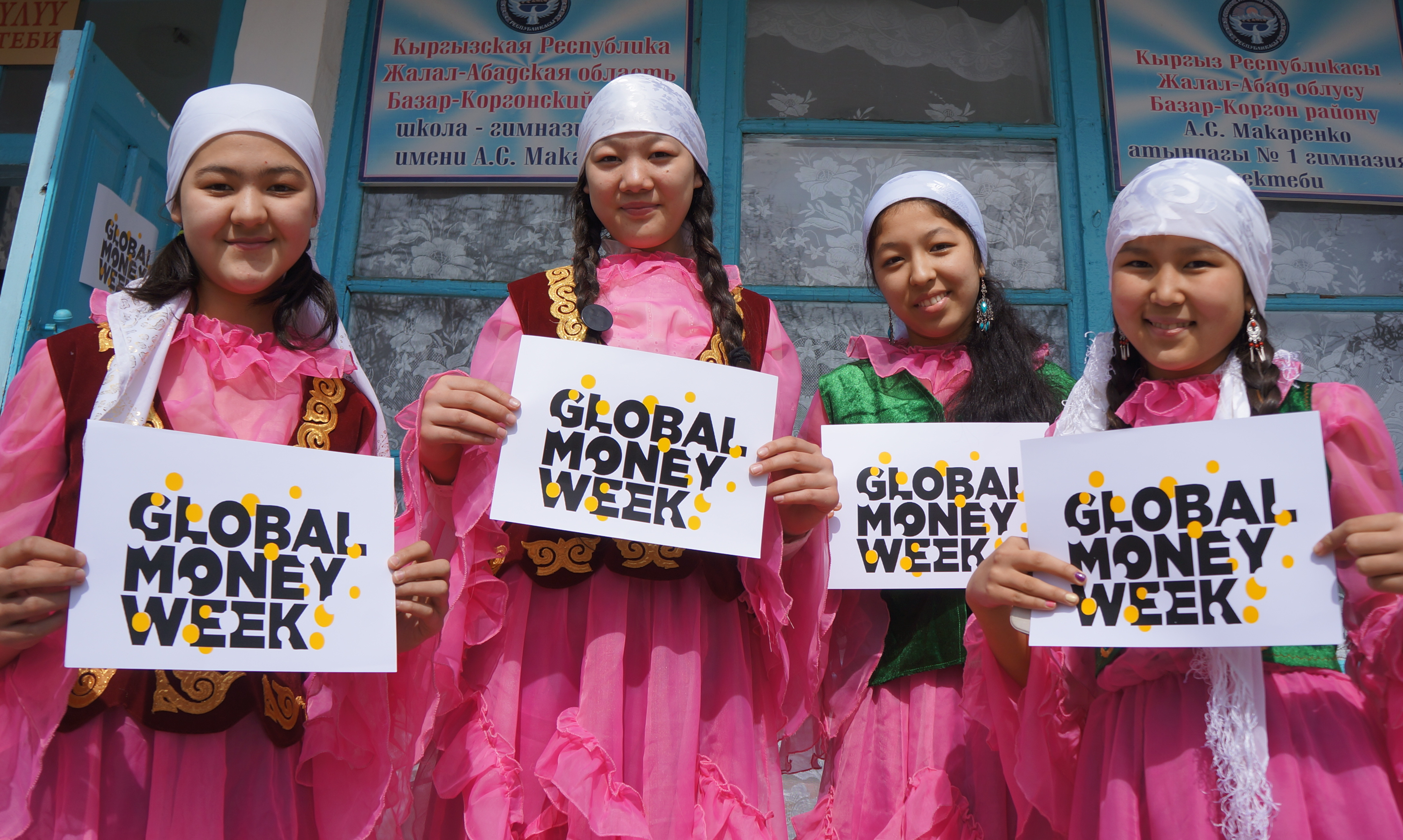
GMW celebrations in Kyrgyzstan

During Global Money Week children and youth are actively involved in the planning, organizing and in the actualization of the events. Activities organized during GMW for children and youth are numerous and they include (among others): youth debates, talks by prominent public figures, webinars, visits to national banks, parliaments, stock exchanges, money museums and local businesses, exhibitions, artistic activities such as theatre plays and cartoons, contests and competitions, financial education games, charity fundraising, video making, radio and TV shows.

== Partners ==
The partners involved in organizing and hosting the events which take place during GMW range from central banks to Ministries of Finance and Education, NGOs, schools, corporations, professional bodies and media. The partners include civil society organizations such as Aflatoun, Children International, Save the Children and World Vision. Notable financial institutions have participated in Global Money Week, such as ING Group, NASDAQ OMX Group, VISA, MasterCard and NYSE Euronext as well as stock exchanges in many countries like Belgium, Lithuania, Kenya, Malaysia, Sweden and the UK, to name a few. A full list can be found online.
