= Bikrampur (disambiguation) =

Bikrampur was a historical city near present-day Dhaka, Bangladesh.

Bikrampur or Vikrampur may also refer to:

== Places ==
- Bikrampur, Mainpuri, a village in Uttar Pradesh, India
- Bikrampur Vihara, an ancient Buddhist vihara at Bikrampur, Bangladesh
- Vikrampur Village, a village in Madhya Pradesh, India

== Other ==
- Bikrampur Kings, a football club based in Bikrampur, Bangladesh

== See also ==
- Vikrampuri, a neighborhood of Secunderabad, Telangana, India
- Bishrampur (disambiguation)
- Birampur Upazila, a subdistrict in Rangpur, Bangladesh
- Birahimpur Sakit, a village in Uttar Pradesh, India
