= Michael Kintu =

Ugandan politician

Katikkiro (Chief Minister) of Buganda
- In office 1955–1964
- Preceded by: Paulo Kavuma
- Succeeded by: Jehoash Mayanja Nkangi

Personal details
- Born: c. 1900 Buganda, Uganda
- Died: fl. 1964
- Party: Kabaka Yekka (KY)
- Spouse: Daughter of Sir Apollo Kaggwa
- Occupation: Politician
- Known for: Leadership of Buganda during independence negotiations; chairman of KY; handling of the 1964 lost counties referendum

Michael Kintu (c. 1900 – fl. 1964) was a Ugandan politician who served as Katikkiro (chief minister/prime minister) of the Kingdom of Buganda from 1955 to 1964. He succeeded Kawalya Kaggwa when becoming the new Katikiro/Prime minister of Buganda kingdom.

Prior to becoming Katikkiro/Prime minister himself, Kintu had "already served for more than twenty years as a chief in the administration", including as Mukwenda (chief adviser) to Katikkiro Paulo Kavuma, who he would later replace. He was also one of the Chief Scouts of Uganda Scouts Association before Independence in 1962. He also chaired the Kintu Committee, established in December 1954 to advise the Bugandan Lukiko on whether to accept the Namirembe recommendations. Ultimately, the Kintu Committee supported the recommendations, with a number of proposed amendments: the deferral of local government and succession reforms, and the instigation of direct elections to the Lukiko. The Kintu Committee's report was adopted by the Lukiko on 9 May 1955 by 77 votes to 8 with 1 abstention.

Kintu's election as Katikkiro in August 1955, which followed the return of Kabaka Mutesa 11 (king) from exile, was tightly contested, with Kintu defeating Matayo Mugwanya 42–41. In government, Kintu was highly critical of the colonial Protectorate government, and pushed for Ugandan independence. In contrast to Kavuma, Kintu was initially supportive of a single Ugandan state. However, his vision for a federal state (with a high degree of self-government for Buganda) brought Buganda into conflict with the British government, which favoured the creation of a unitary state. This resulted in Buganda boycotting the 1958 elections to the Legislative Council (LEGCO), in apparent violation of the terms of the 1955 Agreement, and ultimately in a memorandum of 24 September 1960 that concluded that Buganda should "go it alone" rather than continue progress towards a united Uganda as the British favoured. This disagreement created significant political unrest in Buganda, culminating in the de facto Bugandan boycott of the general election held on the 23 March 1961. However, the success of the Catholic Democratic Party forced a "very reluctant" Kintu to reengage in the independence process, and Buganda duly participated in the Ugandan Constitutional Conference held later in 1961. The Conference agreed that Bugandan representation on LEGCO would be achieved indirectly through the Lukiko. Kintu duly endorsed the Kabaka Yekka (KY), a party formed to preserve the traditional establishment in Buganda, and became its chairman in 1962.Kintu was a central figure in Buganda's political landscape, known for his leadership during independence negotiations. He chaired the "Kintu Committee" in 1954, which advised the Buganda Parliament (Lukiiko) on recommendations for self-government.

Kintu's resignation as Katikkiro in November 1964 followed a vote of no confidence in the Bugandan Lukiko, with members criticising his administration's handling of the 1964 lost counties referendum. He was replaced by Jehoash Mayanja Nkangi, who defeated the KY-endorsed Sepiriya Kisawuzi Masembe-Kabali by 68-22.

Kintu was married to one of the daughters of Sir Apollo Kaggwa. He was a Protestant of "limited education".
