= Buganda Agreement (1955) =

1955 agreement between Uganda and Buganda

The Buganda Agreement (1955) was made on 18 October 1955 between Andrew Cohen, the governor of the Uganda Protectorate, and Mutesa II, Kabaka of Buganda. The agreement facilitated Mutesa II's return as a constitutional monarch of Buganda, ending the Kabaka crisis that began when the Kabaka was exiled to England by Cohen in 1953. It amended the earlier Buganda Agreement (1900). The final text reflected the agreed outcomes of the Namirembe Conference.

== Background ==
Between 1953 and 1955 there was major unrest and discontent in Uganda, part of the British-administered Uganda Protectorate, following a speech in which the British Secretary of State for the Colonies made a "passing reference" to the possibility of East African federation. The incident prompted widespread calls for Bugandan independence as the only protection against British overreach.

In order to force a resolution to the deepening political crisis, the Governor of Uganda, Sir Andrew Cohen, invoked the Uganda Agreement (1900) and demanded that the Kabaka (Mutesa II) fall into line British government policy which favoured the continuation of a single, unitary, Ugandan state. The Kabaka refused. As a result, the British Government withdrew its recognition of Mutesa II as Uganda's native ruler under Article 6 of the 1900 Uganda agreement and forcibly deported Mutesa to Britain. News about Mutesa's deportation severely shocked the Baganda, leading to a constitutional crisis. Cohen's preference was for a new Kabaka to be installed immediately, but this proved impossible, necessitating a fuller negotiated outcome.

THE BUGANDA AGREEMENT, 1955

(See Legal Notice No.190 of 1955
Laws of Uganda, pp 383–418)

AN AGREEMENT made this 18th day of October 1955 between Sir Andrew Benjamin Cohen, Knight Commander of the Most Distinguished Order of Saint Michael and Saint George, Knight Commander of the Royal Victorian Order, Officer of the Most Excellent Order of the British Empire, Governor and Commander in Chief of the Uganda Protectorate on behalf of Her Majesty Queen Elizabeth II, by the grace of God of the United Kingdom of Great Britain and Northern Ireland and of Her other Realms and Territories Queen, Head of the Commonwealth, Defender of the Faith ON THE ONE PART: and Edward William Frederick David Walugembe Mutebi Luwangula Mutesa II Kabaka of Buganda for and on behalf of the Kabaka, Chiefs and People of Buganda ON THE OTHER PART:

WHEREAS by Agreement made on the 29th day of May, 1893, between Mwanga Kabaka of Uganda of the one part and Sir Gerald Herbert Portal, Knight Commander of the Most Distinguished Order of Saint Michael and Saint George, Companion of the Most Honourable Order of the Bath, Her Britannic Majesty’ Commissioner and Consul- General for East Africa on behalf of Her Majesty's Government in the United Kingdom (hereinafter referred to as “Her Majesty’s Government”) of the other part the said Kabaka Mwanga did pledge and bind himself to certain conditions with the object of securing British protection and assistance and guidance for himself and his people and dominions:

AND WHEREAS the said Kabaka Mwanga by the said Agreement undertook on behalf of himself and his successors to make a Treaty in the sense of or in a similar sense to the said Agreement in the event of Her Majesty's Government being willing to assent to the said conditions:

AND WHEREAS on the 19th day of June, 1894, a notification dated the 18th day of June, 1894, was published in the London Gazette stating that under and by virtue of the said Agreement Uganda was placed under the Protectorate of Her Majesty Queen Victoria:

AND WHEREAS in pursuance of the undertaking of the aforementioned and in consideration of the bestowal by Her Majesty Queen Victoria of the protection which the said Kabaka Mwanga had requested in the said Agreement of the 29th day of May, 1893, by a Treaty made on the 27th day of August 1894 (here in after referred to as “the Buganda Agreement, 1894”) between the said Kabaka Mwanga of the one part and Henry Edward Colville, a Companion of the Most Honourable Order of the Bath, a Colonel in Her Majesty's army, Her Britannic Majesty's Acting Commissioner for Uganda, for and on behalf of Her Majesty of the other part, the said Kabaka Mwanga did pledge and hind himself, his heirs and successors to conditions in all respects similar to the conditions set out in the said Agreement:

AND WHEREAS by an Agreement made on the 10th day of March, 1900 (hereinafter referred to as “the Buganda Agreement, 1900”) between Sir Henry Hamilton Johnson, Knight Commander of the Most Honourable Order to the Bath, Her Majesty's Special Commissioner, Commander-in-Chief and Consul-General for the Uganda Protectorate and the adjoining Territories, on behalf of the Kabaka of Buganda, and the Chiefs and People of Buganda on the other part the relationship between Her Majesty's Government, the Government of the Protectorate of‘ Uganda, (hereinafter referred to as “the Protectorate Government”) and the Kabaka, Chiefs and People of Buganda, was further defined and provision was made for recognition of the Kabaka of Buganda as native rulers of Buganda under Her Majesty's protection and over-rule:

AND WHEREAS by various supplementary Agreements the Buganda Agreement, 1900, has been extended and modified;

AND WHEREAS Her Majesty's Government has given an assurance to the Kabaka, Chiefs and People of Buganda in the following terms:-

‘Her Majesty’s Government has no intention whatsoever of raising the issue of East African federation either at the present time or while local public opinion on this issue remains as it is at the present time. Her Majesty’s Government fully recognises that public opinion in the Protectorate generally and Buganda in particular, including the opinion of the Great Lukiko, would be opposed to the inclusion of the Uganda Protectorate in any such federation; Her Majesty’s Government has no intention whatsoever of disregarding this opinion either now or at any time, and recognises accordingly that the inclusion of the Uganda Protectorate in any such federation is outside the realm of practical politics at the present time or while public opinion remains as it is at the present time. As regards the more distant future, Her Majesty’s Government clearly cannot state now that the issue of East African federation will never be raised, since public opinion in the Protectorate including that of the Baganda, might change, and it would not in any case be proper for Her Majesty’s Government to make any statement now which might be used at some time in the future to prevent effect being given to the wishes of the people of the Protectorate at that time. But Her Majesty’s Government can and does say that, unless there is a substantial change in public opinion in the Protectorate, including that of the Baganda, the inclusion of the Protectorate in an East African federation will remain outside the realm of practical politics even in the more distant future”.

AND WHEREAS Her Majesty's Government has given an undertaking that, should the occasion ever arise in the future to ascertain public opinion in terms of the aforesaid assurance, the Protectorate Government will at that time consult fully with the Buganda Government and the other Authorities throughout the country as to the best method of ascertaining public opinion:

AND WHEREAS by an Agreement made on the 15th day of August, 1955, entitled the Buganda (Transitional) Agreement, 1955, representatives of Her Majesty and the Kabaka, Chiefs and people undertook that this Agreement should be executed:

NOW THEREFORE it is hereby agreed and declared as follows:

1. (1) This Agreement may be cited as the Buganda Agreement, 1955, and

shall be read as one with the Buganda Agreement, 1894, the Buganda Agreement, 1900, and the Agreements specified in the Third Schedule to this Agreement.

(2) The Agreements mentioned in paragraph (1) of this article and

this Agreement may be cited together as the Buganda Agreements, 1894 to 1955.

(3) This Agreement shall come into force when executed and shall

thereafter be binding on Her Majesty's Government and the Kabaka, and the Chief and the People of Buganda.

2. (1) The Kabaka (King) of Buganda who is the Ruler of
Buganda shall be styled “His Highness the Kabaka”
shall be elected, as hitherto, by a majority of votes in the
Lukiko

(2) The range of selection must be limited to the Royal Family of Buganda, that is to say, the descendants of Kabaka Mutesa I, and the name of the prince chosen by the Lukiko must be submitted to Her Majesty's Government for approval, and no prince shall be recognised as Kabaka of Buganda whose election has not received the approval of Her Majesty's Government.

3. Before any prince shall be recognised by Her Majesty's Government as Kabaka of Buganda he shall enter into a Solemn Undertaking in accordance with the provisions of the Constitution set out the First Schedule to this Agreement; and so long as he observes the terms of the said Solemn Undertaking, Her Majesty's Government agrees to recognise him as Ruler of Buganda.

4. Buganda shall be administered in accordance with the Constitution set out in the First Schedule to this Agreement, and the provisions of the said Schedule shall have effect as from the date upon which this Agreement comes into force.

5. The Lukiko shall, subject to the provisions of any Buganda law

made pursuant to paragraph (2) of article 21 of the Constitution set out in the First Schedule to this Agreement, be constituted as follows:

(a) the Katikiro (or Prime Minister), the Omulamuzi (or Minister

of Justice), the Omuwanika (or Minister of Finance) and the other members of the Ministry constituted by Article 7 of the said Constitution shall be ex-officio members of the Lukiko;

(b) each chief of a saza (twenty in all) shall also be an ex-officio member of the Lukiko;

(c) the Kabaka may appoint six other persons of importance in the country to be members of the Lukiko during his pleasure.

6. The functions of the Lukiko shall be to discuss matters concerning

the Kabaka's Government, and it may pass resolutions recommending measures to be adopted by the Government, but no effect shall be given to such resolutions without the approval of Her Majesty's Representative, that is to say the Governor except so far as it may be otherwise agreed between him and the Kabaka's Government that such approval shall not be required.

(1) At all times when provision has been made for at least three fifths

of all the Representative Members of the Legislative Council of the Uganda Protectorate to be Africans and for such number of Africans to be appointed as Nominated Members of Council as will bring the total number of Africans who are members of the Council up to at least one half of all the members of the council, excluding the President of the council, then Buganda shall be represented in the Legislative Council of the Uganda Protectorate, and for that purpose at least one quarter of the Representative Members of the Council who are Africans shall be persons who represent Buganda.

(2) The Katikiro shall submit to Her Majesty's Representative, that is to

say the Governor, the names of the candidates for appointment as the Representative Members of the Legislative Council to represent Buganda that is to say the persons who have been elected for that purpose in accordance with the provisions of the Second Schedule to this Agreement.

(3) Notwithstanding the provisions of paragraph (2) of this Article, a

system of direct elections for the Representative Members of the Legislative Council who represent Buganda shall be introduced in the year 1961 if such system has not been introduced earlier.

(4) Her Majesty's Government shall during the year 1957 arrange for

a review by representatives of the Protectorate Government and of the Kabaka's Government of the system of election of Representative Members of the Legislative Council who represent Buganda. In such review consideration will be given to any scheme submitted by the Kabakas Government for the election of such representative Members based upon the recommendation contained in the Sixth Schedule to this Agreement. Every effort will be made to give effect to the Recommendations resulting from such review in time for the election of the Representative Members of the Legislative Council who represent Buganda when the Legislative Council is generally reconstituted after the general vacation of seats in the Council next following the coming into force of this Agreement.

8. The Constitution and jurisdiction of the Kabaka's courts and the administration of justice therein shall be that set out in the Buganda Courts Ordinance of the Uganda Protectorate, subject to the provisions of any Ordinance made with the consent of the Kabaka's Government amending or replacing that Ordinance.

9. Notwithstanding anything contained in the Buganda

Agreement, 1900:-

(a) Payments shall be made by the Protectorate Government to the Kabaka's Government in respect of the revenue and mining rents and royalties payable to the Protectorate Government on land vested in Her Majesty under the provisions of the Buganda Agreements on the same basis as such payments are made to District Councils in the rest of the Uganda Protectorate.

(b) Discussions between Her Majesty's Representative, that is to say the Governor, and the Kabaka's Government with a view to determining whether the status of any land vested in her Majesty by the Buganda.

Agreements can be modified shall be begun as soon as is practicable.

10. (1) The Buganda Agreement, 1900, shall, as from the date of the coming into force of this Agreement, be amended in the manner specified in the Fourth Schedule to this Agreement.

(2) The Agreements specified in the Fifth Schedule to this Agreements shall, as from the date of the coming into force of this Agreement, cease to have effect.

11. No major changes shall be made to the Constitution

set out in the First Schedule to this Agreement for a period of six years after the coming into force of this Agreement, but at the end of that period the provisions of the said Constitution shall be reviewed.

FIRST SCHEDULE

THE CONSTITUTION OF BUGANDA

1. This constitution may be cited as the Constitution of Buganda.

2. (1) In this Constitution the expression “the Kabaka” means the person who is recognized as Kabaka of Buganda under article 2 of the Buganda Agreement, 1955, and the expression “the Kabaka’s Government’’ means the Government established for Buganda by this Constitution.

(2) The Governor of the Uganda Protectorate shall be Her Majesty’s Representative in Buganda and is referred to in this Constitution as “the Governor”.

(3) In this Constitution unless the context otherwise requires -

“Buganda Agreements” means the Buganda Agreements, 1894 to 1955, and any other agreements hereinafter made on behalf of Her Majesty with the Kabaka, Chiefs, and People of Buganda or the Kabaka's Government but does not include any Buganda law or any Standing Order made in pursuance of this Constitution;

“Buganda law” means a law made under the provisions of article 26 of this Constitution or a law enacted by the Kabaka or any Regents before this Constitution comes into force;

“Lukiko” means the Lukiko of Buganda;

“Minister” means a member of the Ministry constituted by article 7 of this Constitution;

“Minor” means, in relation to the Kabaka, a person under the age of eighteen years. - (4) Any reference in this Constitution to an officer in the service of the

Protectorate Government or the Kabaka's Government by the term designating his office shall be construed as a reference to the officer for the time being lawfully performing the functions of the office.

(5) If there shall be a demise of the Crown, references to the Sovereign for the time being shall be substituted for references to Her Majesty, Queen EIizabeth II.

(6) This Constitution shall be expressed in both English and Luganda but,

for the purpose of interpretation, regard shall be had only to the English version.

(7)(1)The Governor may, and shall if so requested by the Kabaka's Council of Ministers or the Kabaka (in respect of any matter affecting his personal position or functions), refer to Her Majesty's High Court of Uganda any question relating to the interpretation of this Constitution, and the High Court shall determine the question in accordance with such procedure as the Chief Justice of the Uganda Protectorate may direct.

(2) Appeals from determinations of the High Court under this article shall lie direct to Her Majesty in Council or the Chief Justice may direct, and accordingly no appeal shall lie to Her Majesty's Court of Appeal for Eastern, Africa.

(3). Buganda in the administration of the Uganda protectorate shall rank as a

province of equal rank with any other provinces into which the Protectorate may be divided.

(4). The Kabaka shall enjoy all the titles, dignities and pre-eminence that attach to

the office of the Kabaka under the law and custom of Buganda and the members of the Royal family of Buganda shall enjoy all such titles and precedence as they have heretofore enjoyed.

(5). (1) The Kabaka shall, before assuming the functions of his office under

this Constitution, enter into a Solemn Undertaking with Her Majesty and with the Lukiko and People of Buganda in the presence of the Governor and representatives of the Lukiko and, so long as he observes the terms of the said Solemn Undertaking he shall be entitled to perform the functions conferred upon him by this Constitution.

(2) The Solemn Undertaking shall be as follows:-

“I….do hereby undertake that I will be loyal to Her Majesty Queen Elizabeth ll, whose protection Buganda enjoys, Her Heirs and Successors and will well and truly govern Buganda according to law and will abide by the terms of the Agreements made with Her Majesty and by the Constitution of Buganda, and that I will uphold the peace, order and good government of the Uganda Protectorate and will do right to all manner of people in accordance with the said Agreements, the Constitution of Buganda, the laws and customs of Buganda and the laws of the Uganda Protectorate without fear or favour, affection or ill—will’’.

(3) If at the time of his election the Kabaka is a minor, then until he attains his majority, except where required by custom, he shall not perform the functions of Kabaka under this Constitution and shall not be required to enter into the said Solemn Undertaking.

(6) (1) (a) If at any time the Kabaka is a minor or is unable, other than by reason

only of his absence from Buganda to perform his functions under this Constitution, the Lukiko shall elect three persons to be Regents.

(b) A Regent elected under sub-paragraph (a) of this paargragh shall

cease to hold office:-

(i) When the Kabaka becomes able to perform his functions under this constitution

(ii) if he resigns by writing under his hand addressed to the Speaker, or

(iii) if his appointment is terminated by the resolution of the Lukiko upon a motion proposed by not less than twenty members of the Lukiko and in favour of which there are cast the votes of not less than two-thirds of all the members of the Lukiko.

(c) The Lukiko may elect a person to any office of Regent if at any time during the subsistence of a Regency under this paragraph that office has become vacant.

(2)(a) Whenever the Kabaka has occasion to be absent from Buganda, he may by writing under his hand appoint three persons to be Regents during such absence.

(b) A Regent appointed under sub-paragraph (a) of this paragraph shall

cease to hold office:-

(i) upon the return of the Kabaka to Buganda;

(ii) if he resigns by writing under his hand addressed to the Kabaka;

(iii) if his appointment is terminated by the Kabaka;

(iv) the Kabaka ceases to be able to perform his functions under this Constitution otherwise than by reason of absence from Buganda.

(c ) The Kabaka may appoint a person to any office of Regent if at any time during the subsistence of a Regency under this paragraph that office has become vacant.

(d) The powers referred to in this paragraph shall not be exercisable during any period in which the Kabaka is a minor or is for any other cause other than absence from Buganda unable to perform his functions under this Constitution.

(3) During the subsistence of a Regency under paragraph (I) or paragraph

(2) of this article, the Regents shall, so long as they observe the terms of the Buganda Agreements and of this Constitution and uphold the peace, order and good government of the Uganda protectorate, and subject to the provisions of paragraphs (4),(5) and (6) of this article have full authority to perform the functions of the Kabaka under this Constitution.

(4)(a) A Regent shall not assume the functions of the office of Regent until he has first taken an oath for the due performance of the office and his election or appointment has been approved by the Governor.

(b) For the purposes of this paragraph, the form of the oath of the office of Regent shall be as follows: “I …………..do hereby swear that I will be loyal to Her Majesty Queen Elizabeth II, whose protection Buganda enjoys, Her Heirs and Successors and will well and truly perform the functions of the office of Regent of Buganda according to law and will uphold the peace, order and good government of the Uganda Protectorate and will do right to all manner of people in accordance with the Agreements made with Her Majesty, the Constitution of Buganda, the laws and customs of Buganda and the laws of the Uganda Protectorate without fear or favour, affection or ill-will. So help me God”.

(5)(a) Any function of the Kabaka under this Constitution shall be performed by the Regents in the same manner, so far as custom allows, as that in which the functions would be performed by the Kabaka save that the signature of two Regents shall be sufficient signification of the will of the Regents.

(b) Where any matter is dependent on the decision of the Regents, any decision shall be regarded as the decision of the Regents if two of the Regents are in favour thereof.

(c) If any Regent is absent from Buganda or for any other reason unable to perform the functions of a Regent or if the office of one of the Regents is vacant, it shall be sufficient if the functions of the regents are performed by two Regents.

(7)(1) There shall be a Ministry for Buganda, which shall be called the

“Kabaka’s Council of Ministers”, and is hereinafter sometimes for brevity referred to as “the Ministry”.

(2) The Kabaka's Council of Ministers shall consist of :-

(a) the Katikiro (b) the Omulamuzi; (c) the Omuwanika (d) the Minister of Health; (e) the Minister of Education; (f) the Minister of Natural Resources:

Provided that the number and designation of members of the Ministry other than the Katikiro, the Omulamuzi and the Omuwanika may be varied from time to time by resolution passed by the Lukiko and approved by the Governor.

(3) When there is occasion for the resignation of the Ministry to be tendered the Katikiro shall tender the resignation of the Minister, collectively to the Kabaka through the Speaker, and the Kabaka shall thereupon accept the resignation; Provided that where the resignation is tendered in accordance with the provisions of article 10 of this Constitution, the Kabaka shall not accept the resignation until the Katikiro designate submits to him the names of persons selected from the ministerial offices in accordance with paragraph (7) of article 12 of this Constitution.

(4) Each member of the Ministry shall have such responsibilities as may be determined by the Karikiro.

8. (1) The Kabaka's Council of Ministers as a whole shall be charged with the

conduct of the Kabaka's Government, and each Minister shall be individually responsible for such departments of the Kabaka's Government as may he placed in his charge.

(2) All acts of the Kabaka's Government shall, save in so far as law and custom otherwise require, shall be done in the name of the Kabaka.

(3) Where any function under this Constitution is exercisable by the Kabaka, that function shall, unless a contrary intention appears, be exercised by him by means of a written instrument signed by him in the presence of a Minister, who shall sign the same as witness.

(4) (a) Where it is provided in this Constitution that the Kabaka may exercise a power upon the recommendation of any person or authority he shall exercise that power in accordance with the recommendation.

(b) (i) A statement in writing signed by the Katikiro that the Kabaka

has exercised any power that is required to be exercised upon the recommendation of the Katikiro or of the Ministry in accordance with the recommendation shall be conclusive evidence of that fact.

(ii) A certified true copy of a minute of the Buganda Appointments Board or of any committee appointed by the Kabaka under this Constitution recording that the Kabaka has exercised any power that is required to be exercised upon the recommendation of the Board or committee in accordance with the recommendation shall be conclusive evidence of that fact.

9. The Katikiro shall keep the Kabaka fully informed on all

important matters concerning the Kabaka's Government.

10. (1) When the Lukiko meets for the first time after any dissolution

thereof, the resignation of the Kabaka's Council of Ministers then in office shall be tendered.

(2) When the resignation of the Ministry has been tendered in

accordance with paragraph of this article, a Katikiro designate shall be elected in accordance with the procedure laid down in article 11 of this Constitution and candidates for the ministerial offices shall be elected in accordance with the procedure laid down in article 12 of this Constitution.

11 (1) The Speaker shall fix a day by which nominations of candidates for

the office of Katikiro shall be submitted to him.

(2)(a)Any person may be nominated as a candidate for the office of

Katikiro, whether or not he is a member of the Lukiko, by not less than five members of the Lukiko.

(b) Nominations shall be submitted in writing signed by the members making them, to the Speaker on or before the day fixed by him in that behalf.

(3) The Speaker shall prepare a list of the persons who have been duly

nominated and shall cause copies of the list to be laid before the Lukiko.

(4) On the fifth weekday after the list has been so laid or such other day as the Speaker shall consider convenient, the Lukiko shall by secret ballot elect as Katikiro designate one of the persons whose name appears on the list and the Speaker shall submit the name of the person so elected to the Governor for approval.

(5) If the name of a person elected as Katikiro designate in accordance with the provisions of paragraph (4) of this article is not approved by the Governor a further election of another person as Katikiro designate shall be held in accordance with the foregoing provisions of this article.

(6) If at any time the office of Katikiro is vacant, the Speaker shall keep the Kabaka informed of the progress of elections under this article.

12 (1) When the Katikiro designate has been elected and his election has been

approved by the Governor, the Speaker shall fix a day by which nominations of candidates for the ministerial offices other than the office of Katikiro shall be submitted to him.

(2) Any person may be nominated as a candidate for the ministerial offices,

whether or not he is a member of the Lukiko, either by the Katikiro designate or by not less than three members of the Lukiko.

(3) Nominations shall be for the ministerial offices generally and not for any

particular ministerial office, and shall be submitted in writing, signed by the person or persons making them, to the Speaker on or before the day fixed by him in that behalf. Provided that:

(a) no persons other than the Katikiro designate shall join in nominating more than three candidates.

(b) the Katikiro designate shall not nominate more than five

candidates.

(4) The Speaker shall prepare a list of the persons who have been duly

nominated for the ministerial offices and shall cause copies of the list to be laid before the Lukiko and if the names of more than fifteen persons appear in the list, the Lukiko shall on the third weekday thereafter, or on such other day as the Speaker shall consider convenient, by secret ballot elect as candidates for the ministerial offices fifteen persons from among whose names appear in the list.

(5) The Katikiro designate shall select persons for appointment to the ministerial offices from the persons whose names appear in the list of candidate (or if the names of more than fifteen persons appear in that list, from the names of the persons elected as candidates by the Lukiko), and shall submit their names to the Governor for approval as a Minister.

(6) If the Governor does not approve the name at a person selected for appointment to a ministerial office, the Katikiro designate shall select another person in the manner specified in paragraph (5) of this article, and shall submit his name to the Governor for approval as a Minister.

(7) The Katikiro designate shall submit the names of the persons selected under the foregoing provisions of this article, as approved by the Governor, to the Kabaka with a recommendation that each such person shall be appointed to a particular ministerial office.

(8) If at any time the office of Katikiro is vacant, the Speaker shall keep the Kabaka informed of the progress of elections under this article.

13. When the names of persons selected for the ministerial offices have been

submitted to the Kabaka, the Kabaka shall appoint the Katikiro designate to be Katikiro by handing him the Ddamula and not earlier than the following day, the Kabaka shall appoint the persons selected to the ministerial offices for which they have been recommend by the Katikiro designate by receiving their homage and allegiance in customary form in respect of such offices.

14 (1) The Kabaka may, on the recommendation of the Katikiro, transfer the

holder of any ministerial office, other than the office of Katikiro, to another such ministerial office. (a) When any person is to be transferred from one ministerial office to another under this article, he shall tender his resignation from the office that he is relinquishing to the Kabaka, who shall then receive his homage and allegiance in customary form in respect of the office to which he is being transferred.

15 (1) If the offices of the Ministers become vacant at any time by reason of

the resignation of the Ministry under article 16 or article 40 of this Constitution, a Katikiro shall be elected in accordance with the procedure laid down in Article 11 and 12 of this Constitution, and the Katikiro designate and the other persons so elected shall be appointed to be Ministers in accordance with article 13 of this Constitution.

(2)(a) If the office of Katikiro becomes vacant at any tine otherwise than by reason of the resignation of the Ministry, a Katikiro designate shall be elected in accordance with the procedure laid down in article 11 of this Constitution, and the Kabaka shall appoint him to the Katikiro by handing him the Ddamula.

(b) When a Katikiro has been appointed in pursuance of sub-.paragraph

(a) of this paragraph, the other Ministers holding office at the time of the appointment shall tender their resignations to the Kabaka and the Katikiro shall recommend to the Kabaka either that he should accept or that he should refuse the resignations, and the Kabaka shall act in accordance with the recommendation.

(c ) If by reason of the acceptance of the resignations, the offices of the Ministers other than the Katikiro become vacant :- (i) the speaker shall fix a day by which nominations of candidates for the ministerial offices other than the office of Katikiro shall he submitted to him;

(ii) any person not being a person who held office as a Minister at the time when the Katikiro was appointed, may be nominated as a candidate for the ministerial offices, whether or not he is a member of the Lukiko, either by the Katikiro or by not less than three members of the Lukiko;

(iii) nominations shall be for the ministerial offices generally and not for any particular ministerial office, and shall be stimulated in writing, signed by the person or persons making them, to the Speaker on or before the day fixed by him in that behalf. Provided that:

a) no person other than the Katikiro shall join in the nomination of more than three candidates;

b) the Katikiro shall not nominate more than five candidates;

(iv) the Speaker shall prepare a list of the persons who have been duly nominated for the ministerial office and shall cause copies of the list to be laid before the Katikiro and if the names of more than ten persons appear on the list, the Lukiko shall on the third weekday thereafter, or on such other day as the Speaker shall consider convenient, by secret ballot elect as candidates for the ministerial offices ten persons from among those persons whose names appear in the list;

v) The Katikiro shall select persons for appointment to the ministerial offices from:-

(a) The persons whose names appear in the list of candidates (or, if the names of more than ten persons appear in that list, from the names of the persons elected as the candidates by the Lukiko); and

(b) the persons who were holding office as Ministers at the time of his appointment, and shall submit their names to the Governor for approval as Ministers;

vi) If the Governor does not approve the name of a person selected for appointment to a ministerial office, the Katikiro shall select another person in the manner specified in subparagraph (v) of this sub-paragraph, and shall submit his name to the Governor for approval as a Minister;

vii) The Katikiro shall submit the names of the persons selected under the foregoing provision of this sub-paragraph, as approved by the Governor, to the Kabaka with a recommendation that each such person shall be appointed to a particular ministerial office, and the Kabaka shall appoint the person selected to the ministerial offices for which they have been recommended by receiving their homage and allegiance in customary form in respect of those offices.

(3)(a) If a ministerial office other than that of the Katikiro becomes vacant at any time otherwise than by reason of the resignation of the Ministry, the Speaker shall, so soon as convenient, fix a day by which nominations of candidates for the office shall be submitted to him.

(b) Any person may be nominated for the vacant office whether or not he is a member of the Lukiko, either by the Katikiro or by not less than three members of the Lukiko.

(c) Nominations shall be submitted in writing signed by the person or persons making them, to the Speaker on or before the day fixed by him in that behalf:

Provided that no person shall join in nominating more than one candidate.

(d) The Speaker shall prepare a list of the persons who have been duly nominated for the vacant office and shall cause copies of the list to be laid before the Lukiko, and if the names of more than five persons appear in the list, the Lukiko shall on the third weekday thereafter or on such other day as the Speaker shall consider convenient, by secret ballot elect as candidates for the vacant office five persons from among those persons whose names appear in the list.

(e) The Katikiro shall select a person for appointment to the vacant office from the persons whose names appear in the list of candidates (or, if the names of more than five persons appear in that list, from the names of the persons elected as candidates by the Lukiko), and shall submit his name to the Governor for approval.

(f) If the Governor does not approve the name of a person selected for appointment to the vacant office, the Katikikiro shall select another person in the manner specified in sub-paragraph (e) of this paragraph, and shall submit his name to the Governor for approval.

(g) When the Governor has approved the name of any person selected under the foregoing provisions of this paragraph the Katikiro shall submit his name to the Kabaka, and the Kabaka shall appoint him to the vacant office by receiving his homage and allegiance in customary form in respect of the office.

16(1) If a motion declared by the Speaker under paragraph (3) of this article to be a motion of no confidence in the Kabaka's council of Ministers on an important matter, in favour of which there are cast the votes of not less than two third of all the members of the Lukiko, is carried by the Lukiko the resignation of the Ministry shall be tendered to the Kabaka through the Speaker.

(2) Fourteen days notice shall be given to the Speaker before any such motion

is debated.

(3) If in the opinion of the Speaker any motion (including a notion that has

been an amended) that has been proposed by nor less than twenty members of the Lukiko is a motion signifying no confidence in the Ministry on an important matter, he shall declare it as such and his declaration shall he final: Provided that any motion proposed by not less than forty members of the Lukiko that specifically expresses no confidence in the Minister shall be deemed for the purposes of this article to be a motion of no confidence in the Ministry on an important matter and shall be declared by the Speaker to be such a motion.

17(1) The office of the Minister shall become vacant:-

a) If the holder of the office resigns by writing under his hand addressed to the Kabaka through the Speaker;

a) If the resignation of the Minister is accepted by the Kabaka; or

b) If the appointment is terminated under article 18 or article 19 of this Constitution.

(2) Whenever the office of the Katikiro becomes vacant the Ddamula shall be

delivered to the Kabaka forthwith in the customary manner.

(3) If ant any time the office of a Minister is vacant, the functions of the Minister

shall be discharged during the period of the vacancy in such manner as the remaining Minister shall decide: Provided that if the office of all the Ministers are vacant, the functions of each Minister (other than those functions that he performs in his capacity as a member of a Lukiko) shall during the period in which the said offices remain vacant, be discharged by the Permanent Secretary to that Minister.

18 (1) The Kabaka shall terminate the appointment of a Minister if he is convicted of a criminal offence and is sentenced to imprisonment without the option of a fine.

(2) If a Minister is convicted of a criminal offence and is not sentenced to imprisonment without the option of a fine, and the offence in the opinion of the Kabaka might involve moral turpitude, the Kabaka shall appoint a committee, consisting of such persons as he shall consider suitable, to enquire into the nature of the offence; and the committee shall; if it is satisfied that the offence involves moral turpitude, inform the Kabak accordingly and thereupon the Kabaka shall terminate the appointment of the Minister.

(3) If in the opinion of the Kabaka a Minister may have become

incapable of performing his functions as a Minister by reason of physical or mental infirmity, the Kabaka shall appoint a committee consisting of such persons as he shall consider suitable to enquire into the matter; and the committee shall, if it is satisfied that the Minister has become incapable of performing his functions as a Minister by reason of physical or mental infirmity, inform the Kabaka accordingly and thereupon the Kabaka shall terminate the appointment of the Minister.

19(1) If in the opinion of the Katikiro any Minister has failed to carry out the policy or the decisions of the Ministry either persistently or in respect of an important matter, he may call a meeting of the Ministers, and propose that the Minister should be dismissed.

(2) The proposal shall be put to vote, and a majority of the votes of the Ministers are cast in favour the proposal, the Katikiro shall recommend to the Kabaka that he should terminate the appointment of the Minister and Kabaka shall terminate the appointment accordingly.

(3) Each Minister, other than the Minister whose dismissal is proposed, may vote on the proposal and in the event of an equality of votes the Katikiro may exercise casting vote as well as an original vote.

20. (1) There shall be a Permanent Secretary to each Minister.

(2) The Permanent Secretary to the Katikiro shall be the Head of the Buganda Civil Service.

21 (1) Subject to the provisions of this article, the Lukiko shall be constituted in accordance with the article 5 of the Buganda Agreement 1955, in the manner provided in the Great Lukiko (Election of Representatives) Law, 1953.

(2) Provision may be made by a Buganda law for amending the aforesaid article

or law, or making other provision in lieu thereof, and generally in respect of all matters relating to the Constitution of the Lukiko.

(3) Notwithstanding the provisions of the Great Lukiko (Election of

Representatives) Law, 1953, the Lukiko as established at the commencement of this Constitution shall stand dissolved on the thirty- first day of December 1958, and thereafter the Lukiko established by this Constitution shall stand dissolved on the thirty-first day of December of every succeeding fifth year: and the provisions of section 5 of the said law shall be deemed to be modified accordingly,

22 (1) When the Lukiko first meets after any dissolution thereof, the members present shall, before transacting any other business, elect a Speaker and a Deputy Speaker of the Lukiko.

(2) As often as the office of Speaker or the Deputy Speaker falls vacant otherwise

than by reason of a dissolution of the Lukiko, the members thereof shall as soon as is practicable elect a person to the office.

(3) A person may be elected to be Speaker whether or not he is a member of the

Lukiko: Provided that no person shall be elected unless he is a person who has been a member of the Lukiko, for at least five years.

(4) No person shall be elected as Deputy Speaker unless he is a member of the

Lukiko and is a person who would be eligible for election as Speaker.

(5) The Speaker shall receive such salary as may from tine to time be determined

by a Buganda law.

(6) The office of the Speaker or the Deputy Speaker shall become vacant :-

a) If the holder of the office resigns his office by writing under his hand addressed to the Katikiro;

b) In the case of the Deputy Speaker if he ceases to be a member of the Lukiko otherwise than by reason of a dissolution thereof; or

c) If his appointment is terminated by resolution of the Lukiko upon a motion proposed by not less than twenty members of the Lukiko and in favour of which there are cast, the votes of not less than two-thirds of all the members of the Lukiko.

23. There shall preside at meetings of the Lukiko:-

a) The Speaker

a) In the absence of the Speaker, the Deputy Speaker;

b) In the absence of the Speaker, and the Deputy Speaker, such person as may be elected by the Lukiko from among the members of the Lukiko

24. Subject to the provisions of this Constitution and of the Buganda Agreements, the Lukiko may take Standing Orders for the regulation and orderly conduct of its own proceedings and for the passing of Buganda laws: Provided that no such Orders shall have effect unless they have been approved by the Governor.

25. (1) Save as otherwise provided in this Constitution

(a) all questions proposed for decision in the Lukiko shall be determined by a majority of the votes of the members present and voting; Provided that neither the Speaker nor the Deputy Speaker, nor any member of the Lukiko while presiding therein, shall have a vote or be entitled to take part in debate;

(b) If on any question the votes are equally divided, the motion shall be lost.

(2) No business except that of adjournment shall be transacted in the Lukiko if there

are present (beside the Speaker or other person presiding) less than forty-five members of the Lukiko.

26 (1) Subject to the provisions of the this Constitution and of the Buganda Agreements, the Kabaka may, with the advice and consent of the Lukiko, make laws binding upon Africans in Buganda: Provided that no law shall be enacted by the Kabaka unless the draft thereof has first been approved by the Governor.

(2) When a draft law has been passed by the Lukiko in accordance with Standing Orders made under article 24 of this Constitution and has been approved by the Governor, it shall be submitted by the Katikiro to the Kabaka, who shall sign the same in token of assent, whereupon the draft shall become a law.

(3) A law enacted under this article shall be published in the Uganda Gazette, and shall come into operation on the date of its publication or on such other date as may be provided in the law.

(4) The laws made for the general governance of the Uganda Protectorate shall be equally applicable to Buganda, except in so far as they may in any particular conflict with the terms of the Buganda Agreements, in which case terms of the Buganda Agreements shall constitute a special exception in regard to Buganda.

(5) For the purpose of this article the expression “African” shall have the meaning assigned to it by the Interpretation and General Clauses Ordinance of the Uganda Protectorate, as from time to time amended, or any Ordinance replacing that ordinance.

27. (1) The annual estimates of revenue and expenditure of the Kabaka's Government and schedules of supplementary expenditure, which may be submitted quarterly, shall require the approval of the Governor.

(2) The accounts of the Kabaka's Government shall be audited by officers of Her

Majesty's Overseas Audit Service

(3) Moneys granted or lent by the Protectorate Government to the Kabaka's

Government for any specific purpose shall be expended in such, manner as may be approved by the Governor

28 (1) If any motion for the approval of the annual estimates of revenue and expenditure of the Kabak's Government of schedules of supplementary expenditure or for making financial provision for any purpose is proposed in the Lukiko by a Minister, and the motion is rejected by the Lukiko, the Katikiro may give notice to the Speaker that he proposes to treat the said motion as a matter of confidence in the Ministry.

(2) At any time not less than, fourteen days and not more than twenty-eight days after notice has been given to the Speaker in pursuance of paragraph

(1) of this article, a Minister may again propose the motion with or without amendment.

(3) If the motion is then rejected by the Lukiko by the votes of at least two thirds of all the members of the Lukiko, a vote of no confidence in the Kabaka's Council of Ministers shall be deemed to have been carried by the Lukiko, and the resignation of the Ministry shall be tendered in accordance with the provisions of article 7 of this Constitution; but in any case the motion shall be deemed to have been carried by the Lukiko.

(4) In this article the expression ‘rejected by the Lukiko” means not carried by the Lukiko without amendment or carried by the Lukiko with amendments that are not acceptable to the Ministry.

29. (1) The Lukiko may establish standing and ad hoc committees, consisting of

members of the Lukiko, for any purpose.

(2) The Lukiko shall establish a standing committee to deal with each of the

following subjects: -

(a) Finance: (b) Public works (c) Education (d) Health; (e) Natural Resources (f) Local Government and Community Development:

Provided that the Lukiko may by resolution vary the subjects specified in this paragraph.

(3) Each standing committee established under paragraph (2) of this article shall be under the chairmanship of the Minister responsible for the subject with which the committee is dealing; and its function shall be to study that subject and advise the Minister thereon.

(4) The Permanent Secretary to the Minister who is chairman of the committee and

any other persons who are required by the committee for its efficient working may attend and take part in the deliberations of any committee established under paragraph, (2) of this article, but shall not vote therein.

(5) Nothing in this article shall apply to or affect the functions of the Standing Committee of the Lukiko in existence at the commencement of this Constitution.

30. (1) There shall be established a board, called the Buganda Appointments Board

(hereinafter in this article referred to as the “Board”), which shall consist of :-

(a) A Chairman who shall be appointed by the Kabaka with the approval of the Governor;

(b) The Permanent Secretary to the Katikiro who shall, ex-officio, be deputy chairman; and

(c) Three other persons, who shall be appointed by the Kabaka upon the recommendation of the Ministry with the approval of the Governor.

(2) The Ministry shall recommend or appointment as members of the Board

persons who they are satisfied are experienced in public affairs but are not at the time actively engaged in politics.

(3) The office of a person appointed to be a member of the Board in pursuance of sub-paragraphs (a) or (c) of paragraph (1) of this article shall became vacant -

a) in the case of the chairman, at the expiration of seven years from the dateof his appointment;

b) in the case of a member of the Board, other than the chairman, at the expiration of five years from the date of his appointment;

c) if he resigns; or

d) if his appointment is terminated under paragraph (4) of this article.

(4) (a) The Kabaka shall terminate the appointment of a member of the Board if he is convicted of a criminal offence and is sentenced to imprisonment without the option of a fine.

(b) If a member of the Board is convicted of a criminal offence and is not sentenced to imprisonment without the option of a fine, and the offence in the opinion of the Kabaka might involve moral turpitude, the Kabaka shall appoint a committee consisting of such persons as he shall consider suitable to enquire into the nature of the offence; and the committees shall, if it is satisfied that the offence involved moral turpitude inform the Kabaka accordingly, and thereupon the Kabaka shall terminate the appointment of the member.

(c) If in the opinion of the Kabaka a member of the Board may have become

incapable of performing his functions as a member of the Board by reason of physical infirmity, the Kabaka shall appoint a committee consisting of such persons as he shall consider suitable to enquire into the matter; and the committee shall, if it is satisfied that the member has become incapable of performing his infirmity, inform the Kabaka accordingly, and thereupon the Kabaka shall terminate the appointment of the member.

31 (1) (a) Appointments to office of Permanent Secretary to a Minister, to the office of the Saza Chief, Gombolola Chief, Muluka Chief, and to the offices specified in Appendix B of this Constitution, shall subject to the provisions of this article, be made by the Kabaka on the recommendation of the Buganda Appointments Board.

(b) The Board shall only recommend for appointment as Permanent Secretary to

the Katikiro a person who is at the time a Saza Chief or other senior officer in the service of the Kabaka's Government.

(c) No person shall be appointed to the office of Permanent Secretary to a

Minister without the approval of the Governor, which approval shall not be withheld unless the Governor is satisfied that there are exceptional circumstances in which he ought to withhold his approval.

(d) The Kabaka shall make appointments under this paragraph by receiving

from, each person to be appointed to an office his homage and allegiance in customary form in respect of that office.

(2) (a) The Buganda appointments Board shall, subject to the provisions of this

article be responsible for the appointment of all officers and employees in the service of the Kabaka's Government other than those appointed by the Kabaka under paragraph (1) of this article. For the purposes of this paragraph, the office of Minister, Speaker of the Lukiko, Deputy Speaker of the Lukiko and the member of the Appointment Board shall not be regarded as officers in the service of the Kabaka's Government.

(3) Appointments under this article shall be in conformity with the provisions of the Buganda Staff Regulations.

(4) The provisions of this article shall not extend to officers seconded from the service of the Protectorate of the Kabaka's Government.

32(1) (a) The office of a Permanent Secretary to a Minister or a Saza Chief shall become
vacant:-

i. If the holder of the office resigns by writing under his hand addressed to the

Kabaka through the Katikiro.

ii. In case of the Permanent Secretary to the Katikiro, if his appointment is

terminated by the Kabaka on the recommendation of the Katikiro on the grounds of misconduct, inefficiency or ill health.

iii. In the case of the Permanent Secretary to a Minister, other than the

Permanent Secretary to the Katikiro and in the case of a Saza Chief, if his appointment is terminated by the Kabaka on the recommendation of the Buganda Appointments Board on the grounds of misconduct, inefficiency or ill health.

(b) The appointment of a Permanent Secretary to a Minister shall not be terminated under sub- paragraph (a) of this paragraph without the approval of the Governor, which approval shall not be withheld unless the Governor is satisfied that there are exceptional circumstances in which he ought to withhold his approval.

(2) An office in the service of the Kabaka's Government, not being an office to which, paragraph (1) of this article applies, shall become vacant —

(a) If the holder of the office resigns;

(b) If his appointment is terminated by the Buganda Appointments Board on the grounds of misconduct, inefficiency or ill-health.

(3) The Buganda Appointments Board shall, subject to the provisions of this article, be responsible for the disciplinary control of all chiefs, officers and employees in the service of the Kabaka's Government other than the Permanent Secretary to the Katikiro.

(4) The powers conferred upon the Buganda Appointments Board by this article, shall be exercised in conformity with the provisions of the Buganda Staff Regulations.

(5) The provisions of this article shall not exceed to officers seconded from the service of the Protectorate Government to the service of the Kabaka's Government

(6) For the purposes of this article, the offices of Minister, Speaker of the Lukiko, Deputy Speaker of the Lukiko and member of the Buganda Appointments Board shall not be regarded as officers in the service of the Kabaka's Government.

33(1) The Kabaka's Council of Ministers, after consultation with the Governor, may make regulations to be known as the Buganda Staff Regulations, for all or any of the following purposes relating to persons in or desiring to enter the service of the Kabaka's Government:

(a) the manner in which the Buganda Appointments Board shall carry out its functions.

(b) the maintenance of discipline;

(c) the regulation of appointments( including appointments, on promotion and transfer), remuneration, termination of appointments, and leave;

(d) providing for suspension from duty and the salary to be paid during such suspension;

(e) regulating the payment of allowances, the making of advances and other terms and conditions of service

(f) authorizing the Buganda Appointments Board to its responsibilities under paragraph (2) of article 32 of this Constitution in respect of such classes of officers and employees in the service of the Kabaka's Government as may be specified in the regulations; and

(g) such other matters relating to departmental procedure and the duties and responsibilities of chiefs, officers and employees, as the Ministers consider can be best regulated by such regulations: Provided that no regulations made under this paragraph shall come into operation until they have been approved by the Governor.

(2) The Buganda Staff Regulations in so far as they relate to discipline, may, without prejudice to the generality of the provisions of paragraph(1) of this article, provide for:- a) withholding or deferring increments either permanently or a specified period

b) reduction in rank or salary permanently or temporarily

c) deductions from salary in respect of damage to property caused by misconduct or breach of duty.

(3) The Buganda Staff Regulations as from time to time in force shall, except as otherwise provided in such regulations or in any contract of service form part of the terms of service of any person to whom they apply.

(4) Except so far as may be otherwise agreed by the Governor and the Kabaka's Government, the Buganda Staff Regulations shall not apply to officers seconded from the service of the Protectorate Government to the service of the Kabaka's Government.

34. (1) For the purposes of administration Buganda shall as heretofore be divided into the following Sazas namely: Kiagwe, Bugerere, Bulemezi, Buruli, Bugangadzi, Buyaga, Bwekula, Singo, Busuju, Gomba, Butambala, Kiadondo, Busiro, Mawokota, Buvuma, Sese, Buddu, Koki, Mawogola, Kabula and each Saza shall be divided into gombololas and each gombolola into miruka.

(2) At the head of each saza there shall be a chief, who shall be called a Saza Chief who shall be responsible to the Katikiro for the administration of his saza, for the collection of all taxes imposed by the Kabaka's Government and for the collection of poll tax on behalf of the Protectorate Government .

(3) Every gombolola in each saza shall be in the charge of a chief, who shall be called a Gombolola Chief, and every muluka in each gombolola shall be in the charge of a chief, who shall be styled a Muluka Chief.

(4) Gombolola and Muluka Chiefs shall assist Saza Chiefs in the performance of their duties.

(5) The Governor may give directions to the Kabaka's Government as to the manner in which, the Saza Chiefs shall perform their functions in relation to the maintenance of law and order.

35. (1) The Resident of Buganda shall be the Governor's representative in his relations with the Kabaka's Government;

(2) (a) The functions of the Resident shall be:

i.to advise and assist the Kabaka's Government in the discharge of its functions;

ii.to keep the protectorate Government informed of the views of the Kabaka's

Government and of important developments in Buganda.

iii. to keep the protectorate Government informed of the views of the Kabaka's

Government and of important developments in Buganda.

(b) In the discharge of his functions under this article, the Resident shall be assisted by a staff consisting of such officers and employees of the Protectorate Government as the Governor shall think fit.

(b) The functions of officers and employees of the Protectorate Government stationed in Buganda, other than the Resident and his staff and officers who have been seconded to the service of the Kabaka's Government, shall, in relation to the Kabaka's Government, be to give advice and assistance to the Kabaka's Government and its officers and employees in respect of the departmental activities for which such officers and employees of the Protectorate Government are responsible.

36 (1) The Local Government in each saza shall be developed in such manner as may be agreed by the Governor and the Kabaka's Government.

(2) Except in so far as may be otherwise agreed under paragraph (1) of this article, the Resident and his staff shall advise and assist the Saza Chiefs and, through them, the local councils, in the development of local government.

37 The Protectorate Government acting through the officers concerned shall be entitled to inspect:

a) such services administered by the Kabaka's Government as officers of the Protectorate Government have heretofore inspected; and

b) the services to be transferred to the Kabaka's Government pursuant to article 38 of this Constitution.

38. (1) The Kabaka's Government shall assume responsibility for the administration in Buganda of the services, hitherto administered by the Protectorate Government, set out in Appendix A of this Constitution (in this article referred to as “the transferred services”) so soon as suitable arrangements have been made for the secondment of the necessary officers and employees of the Protectorate Government in pursuance of paragraph (4) of this article.

(2) The Kabaka's Government shall administer the transferred services in accordance with the laws governing those services and, subject thereto, with the general policy of the Protectorate Government.

(3) The Governor may by order under his hand made with the concurrence of the Kabaka's Government vary Appendix A to this Constitution.

4(a) Such officers and employees of the Protectorate Government as the Governor and the Kabaka's Government shall agree are necessary shall be seconded to the service of the Kabaka's Government, on such terms as may be so agreed, for the purpose of assisting in the administration of the transferred services: Provided that no officer or employee shall be so seconded without his written consent.

(b) Officers seconded from the service of the Protectorate Government to the service of the Kabaka's Government may be appointed as Permanent Secretaries to Ministers who are administering the transferred services

39 If any disagreement arises between the Protectorate Government and the Kabaka's Government, and the disagreement cannot be resolved by discussion between the representative of the two Governments, and the Governor is satisfied that the issue affects the interests of the peace, order or good government of the Uganda Protectorate, the Governor may tender formal advice to the Ministers upon the matter.

40. lf the Ministers refuse to accept formal advice tendered to them by the Governor under article 39 of this Constitution, the Governor may give notice to the Speaker that he requires the Kabaka's Council of Ministers to resign, and upon receipt of any such notice, the Speaker shall forthwith inform the Kabaka, the Lukiko and the Katikiro; and the resignation of the Ministry shall be tendered to the Kabaka through the Speaker when the Katikiro is so informed.

41. The Constitution of Buganda contained in the First Schedule to the Buganda (Transitional) Agreement, 1955 (hereinafter in this article referred to as ‘the Transitional Constitution”) shall cease to have effect on the coming into force of this Constitution. Provided that the Solemn Undertaking made under the provisions of article 41 of the Transitional Constitution shall he deemed to have been made under paragraph (1) of article 5 of this Constitution and the provisions in respect thereof in that article shall apply thereto: And provided that any appointment lawfully made or anything done under the provisions of the Transitional Constitution shall be deemed to have been done under this Constitution. And provided further that the Kabaka shall appoint the acting Ministers appointed under the Transitional Constitution to be the Ministers under this Constitution in the manner provided in article 13 of this Constitution.

APPENDIX “A” TO THE FIRST SCHEDULE

(a) Primary schools and junior secondary schools;

(b) Rural hospitals, dispensaries (including sub-dispensaries), aid posts and rural health

services.

(c) The field service for the improvement of farming methods and soil conservation:

(d) The field service for the improvement of farming methods and soil conservation of

livestock breeding and keeping and disease control.

(e) Local Government in the Sazas.

(f) Community Development (Provided that this service shall be administered concurrently with the Government of the Protectorate.) APPENDIX “B” TO THE FIRST SCHEDULE The Assistants to Ministers The Secretary to the Lukiko The Private Secretary to the Kabaka The Provincial Luwalo Inspector Assistants to the Provincial Luwalo Officer The Omukulu wo Lubiri The Omukulu we Komera Deputy Saza Chiefs Legal Assistants to Saza Chiefs and Gombolola Chiefs

SECOND SCHEDULE

REGULATIONS FOR THE ELECTION OF PERSONS FOR RECOMMENDATION TO THE GOVERNOR FOR APPOINTMENT AS REPRESENTATIVE MEMBERS FROM BUGANDA OF THE LEGISLATIVE COUNCIL OF THE UGANDA PROTECRORATE

1. These Regulations may be called the Buganda (Legislative Council Candidates) Regulations. 2. In these Regulations anything ordered to be done by the Chief may be done by his deputy if the Chief is incapable of doing it because of illness or for other good cause.

3. If by these Regulations the day on which anything ordered to be done is a Sunday or holiday, that which is ordered to be done on that day may be done on the next working day.

4. In these Regulations the “Electoral Law” means the Great Lukiko (Election of Representative) Law 1953, as may be from time to time amended.

5. Whenever there is occasion to appoint a Representative Member or Members to represent Buganda in the Legislative Council of the Protectorate the Governor shall by notice in writing request the Katikiro to submit names to him for that purpose and the Katikiro shall submit to him the names of persons who have been elected in that behalf by the Electoral College in accordance with these Regulations.

6. (1) There shall be established an electoral college for Buganda (herein referred to as the Electoral College) which shall consist of three persons elected in accordance with the provisions of these Regulations from each Saza in Buganda.

(2) The election of persons to the Electoral College shall take place so soon after the
commencement of these Regulations as the necessary arrangements can be made.

(3)If any member of the Electoral College for any reason ceases to be a member of the

Electoral College, the Saza which elected him shall, in the same manner as his predecessor was elected, on being required so to do by the Katikiro, elect a person to fill the vacancy.

7. The three representatives from each Saza shall be elected as members of the Electoral College by representatives of each Muluka who have themselves been elected for this purpose in the manner provided in these Regulations.

8. (1)Whenever there is an election for the Electoral College an election shall he held in each Muluka for the purpose of electing one representative from each Muluka (to be known as the Muluka Representative).

(2) the Miruka Representatives so elected shall themselves elect in accordance with the provisions of these Regulations three persons to be Representatives in the Electoral College.

9. Every person entitled to vote at a Muluka election under the Electoral Law shall be entitled to vote at a Muluka election under these Regulations.

10. The latest Register of Voters kept under the provisions of section 9 of the Electoral Law shall be used for the purposes of elections under these Regulations.

11. So soon as the Katikiro announces there to be an election of members of the Electoral College every Muluka Chief shall cause all voters in his Muluka to be informed that a meeting of voters will take place in the Muluka Hall on the day fixed by the Katikiro for the Election of Miruka Representatives.

12. Any person who was eligible to be elected as a Muluka Representative under the Electoral Law at the last preceding elections to the Lukiko shall be eligible to be elected as a Muluka Representative under these Regulations.

13. (1) On the day fixed by the Katikiro for the election of Miruka Representatives the Muluka Chief shall be present at the Muluka Hall and shall preside over the meeting for the election of Miruka Representatives.

(2) The Miruka Representatives shall thereupon be elected in the same manner as

Miruka Representatives are elected under the Electoral Law.

14. (I) Any person wishing to stand as a candidate for election as a member of the Electoral College shall present to the Saza Chief not later than a day fixed by the Katikiro for that purpose an application in the Form “A” in the Appendix to these Regulations signed by himself. The Muluka Chief of the Muluka, where a person wishing to stand as a candidate lives, shall sign as a witness.

(2)Not later than three days after the day fixed for the submission of application under

paragraph (1) of this Regulation the Saza Chief shall cause a list of all candidates for election to be displayed in a prominent place at the headquarters of the Saza and of every Gombolola in the Saza.

(3)The Saza Chief shall not place on the list of candidates for election any person who in his opinion is not qualified to be a Saza Representative under the provisions of section 8 of the Electoral Law. Any person may within three days appeal against the decision of the Saza Chief to the Special Court established under section 321 of the Electoral Law who shall hear the appeal before a date to be fixed by the Katikiro.

I5. On the day fixed by the Katikiro in that behalf the Miruka Representatives shall meet in the Council Hall of the Saza to elect three of the persons offering themselves as candidates for appointment as Representatives in the Electoral College and such election shall take place in the same manner as is provided for elections of Saza Representatives under the Electoral Law.

16. The Saza Chief shall forward to the Katikiro so soon as the elections of the Saza are completed a return of Form “B” in the Appendix to these Regulations showing the names of the persons elected as Representatives.

(a) Provided that he shall not cast more votes than the number of candidates that require to be elected and shall not cast more than one vote in favour of any particular person.

(b) the chairman assisted by two tellers appointed by him from amongst the members shall count the votes cast and shall declare elected the person or persons who have the most votes;

(c) if a number of candidates have received the same number of votes, and if a single candidate having received that number of votes would have been elected, the chairman shall require the Electoral College to vote again to decide which of the candidates with equal votes shall be elected and for this purpose shall provide each member with a fresh voting paper. (2) Any voting paper improperly completely shall not be used in counting votes.

17. The Special Court established under the Electoral Law shall have the same functions in relation to elections held under these Regulations as it has in relation to elections held under the Electoral Law.

18. So soon as the Governor requests the Katikiro to submit a name or names for the appointment of a person or persons as a Representative Member or Members of the Legislative Council the Katikiro shall summon the Electoral College to meet on a convenient date and if the Electoral College has not yet been elected shall fix all the necessary dates for elections to the Electoral College.

19. (1) When the Electoral College meets on the first occasion it shall elect a chairman from amongst its members who shall thereupon and on each subsequent occasion when the Katikiro summons the Electoral College fix a day within seven days of his election by which nominations of candidates for submission to the Governor shall be submitted to him.

(2) Nominations shall be in writing and shall be submitted to the chairman by not less than three members of the Electoral College.

20 (1)Persons may be nominated as candidates for recommendation to the Governor whether or not they are members of the Electoral College.

(2) No person shall he nominated as a candidate for submission to the Governor if- (a) he is in prison, or (b) he is not literate in the English language, or (c) he is not resident in Buganda, or (d) he is not twenty-one years of age.

21. (1) The Chairman of the Electoral College shall prepare a list of the persons who have been duly nominated and shall so soon as convenient summon the Electoral College and cause copies of the list to be laid before it.

(2) If the number of persons who have been duly nominated does not exceed the number of candidates required the chairman shall forward the names of these persons to the Katikiro for submission to the Governor for appointment as Representative Members of the Legislative Council.

(3) If the number of persons who have been duly nominated exceeds the number of candidates required the Electoral College shall proceed forthwith by secret ballot to elect the required number of candidates from among the persons nominated.

22 (1) Elections by the Electoral College shall be conducted in the following manner-

(a) each member shall be given a voting paper on which the names of the persons duly nominated are written and shall cast his vote in favour of the person or persons whom he wishes to be elected by putting a cross against the name of each such person on the voting paper. Provided that he shall not cast more votes than the number of candidates that require to be elected and shall not cast more than one vote in favour of any particular person.

(b) the chairman assisted by two tellers appointed by him from amongst the members shall count the votes cast and shall declare elected the person or persons who have the most votes;

(c) if a number of candidates have received the same number of votes, and isf a single candidate having received that number of votes would have been elected, the chairman shall require the Electoral College to vote again to decide which of the candidate with equal votes shall be elected and for this purpose shall provide each member with a fresh voting paper.

(2) Any voting paper improperly completed shall not be used in counting votes.

23. The Chairman of the Electoral College, after an election, shall forthwith forward to the Katikiro the names of the person or persons elected and the Katikiro shall thereupon submit the names of such person or persons to the Governor for appointment as Representative Members of the Legislative Council.

24. (1) Any person who in respect of elections under these Regulations acts in a manner which, in respect of elections under the Electoral law, would be an offence under that Law shall be guilty of an offence under these Regulations and shall on conviction be liable to the same penalty as he would have been liable if he had been found guilty of a similar offence under the Electoral Law.

(2) Any offence against these Regulations shall be triable, if the offender is an African, by the Principal Court established under the Buganda Courts Ordinance of the Uganda Protectorate.

APPENDIX FORM A

(Regulation 14)

I ...........................of .......................in the Muluka of...............in the Gombola of ....................in the Saza of.............. offer myself for election as a representative of the Saza of ..........................in the Electoral College.

..................................

Signature of Candidate.

.................................

Signature of Chief

Date..............................

FORM B (Regulation 16)

I ..............................Saza Chief..............declare that the following were elected in my Saza as Saza Representatives in the Electoral College: Name Saza .................................................. ...................................... .................................................. ...................................... .................................................. ......................................

......................................

Signature of Chief

At ...................................... On...................19................

......................................

......................................

......................................

Signature of Chairman
Secretary and Examiners

THIRD SCHEDULE

The Uganda Agreement (Judicial),1905 The Uganda Memorandum of Agreement (Forests), 1907 The Uganda (Payment of Chiefs) Agreements 1908

The Buganda Agreement (Allotment and Survey) 1913

The Uganda Agreement (Poll Tax), 1920

FOURTH SCHEDULE

1. For the expression “the Kingdom of Uganda” whenever it occurs throughout there shall be substituted the expression “the Kingdom of Buganda’’.

2. Article l. Delete the word “Uganda” in the last sentence and substitute the word

“Buganda”.

3. Article 6. Delete the first sentences, ending with the expression “subject such sentence to Reconsideration”.

4. Article 8. Delete this Article.

5. Article 9. Delete this Article except for the sixth sentence, which begins with the words “When arrangements have been made”, and the last sentence.

6. Article 10. Delete this Article.

7. Article 11. Delete this Article.

8. Article 12(a) Delete the expression ‘‘guided by a majority of votes in his native council” in the third sentence and substitute “ guided by a resolution passed by a majority of votes in the Great Lukiko”

(b) Delete the expression “province of Uganda” whenever it occurs and substitute province of Buganda”

FIFTH SCHEDULE

The Buganda Agreement (Native Laws), I910 The Buganda (Declaratory) Agreement (Native Laws), 1937

SIXTH SCHEDULE

EXTRACT FROM THE REPORT OF THE SUB-COMMITTEE OF THE LUKIKO SET UP TO EXAMINE THE RECOMMENDATIONS MADE BY THE HANCOCK COMMITTEE

“The Hancock Committee proposed that the Baganda representatives should be elected by the Lukiko itself. We think, after very careful consideration that they should be directly elected by the people – whom they will represent”.

SIGNED this eighteen day of October, 1955. For and on behalf of Her Majesty Queen Elizabeth, II A.B. COHEN Governor

For and on behalf of the

Kabaka, Chiefs and People of Buganda MUTESA

Kabaka

WITNESSES:

C. H. HARTWELL

M. KINTU R. DRESCHFIELD A.M. GITTA L.M. BOYD B.K. KAVUMA K.S. MALE A. KALULE SEMPA Y.K LULE R.M. KASULE A.K. KIRONDE D.S. MUSOKE MUKUBIRA C.A.L. RICHARDS D. SERWANIKO L. SSENDAGALA A. KIRONDE Y.M. YAKUZE H. M.N. KIBIRIGE JUMA TAMUSANGE ANDREA K. LUBECA SERWANO KAPALAGA JOSEPH MUTEWETA L. BASSUDE D.K MUKASA Y. MATOVU LUBOWA E.M. K. MULIIRA P. NTWATWA SHEIK A. KASUJJA E.M. KALULE KENNETH DIPLOCK DINGLE FOOT J.G. MARTIN FLEGG

== Namirembe Conference ==
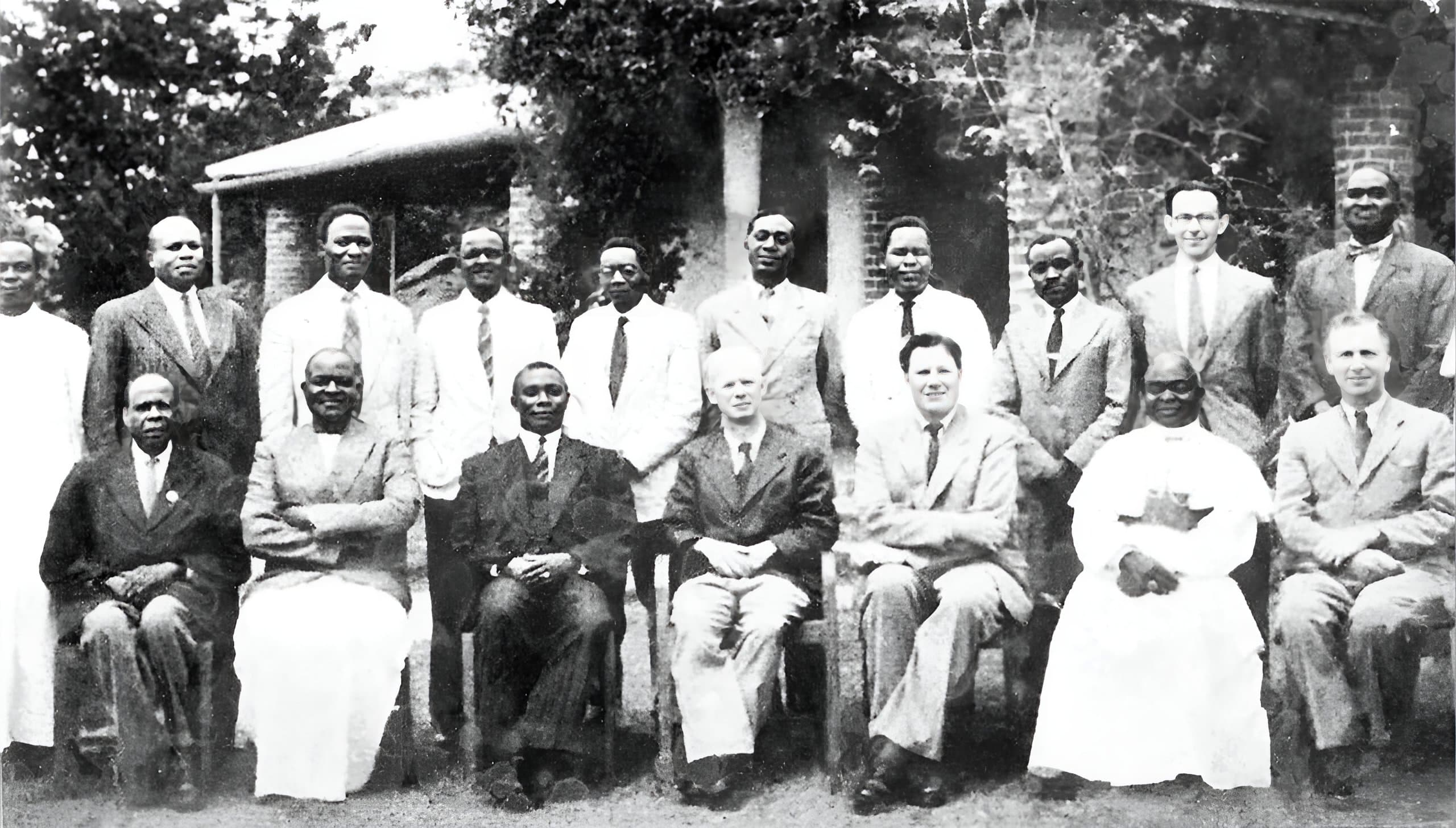
Delegatesa to the 1954 Namirembe Conference pose for a group photograph in Kampala, Uganda.Yosia Kyazze, a former Minister of Finance in the Buganda Government, is pictured at the far left, while Sir Keith Hancock, who chaired the conference, is pictured at the far right.

Following a successful Bugandan delegation to London, new negotiations on the future of Baganda took place in June to September 1954 at Namirembe, with the Australian Sir Keith Hancock (Director of the Institute of Commonwealth Studies in London) acting as the mediator and Stanley Alexander de Smith as Secretary. Initially, Hancock met solely with a constitutional committee selected by the Lukiiko. The four main issues considered by the committee were the degree to which Buganda was 'independent' under the 1900 Agreement; the balance between federalism versus the need to preserve a unitary Ugandan state; the role of the Kabaka; and the participation of Buganda in the Uganda Legislative Council (LEGCO). Discussions were lengthy, and while there was some progress, it was clear to Hancock that the Committee in particular held firm views in favour of a federal model for Buganda that would be at odds with the British emphasis on a unitary state.

The Namirembe Conference proper opened on 30 July, with both the Committee and Cohen represented. On the crucial issue of federalism, Cohen produced a paper in early August arguing for greater devolution to Buganda, without going as far as federalism. At the same time, the non-African members of LEGCO agreed to give up one European and one Asian representative seat and transfer these to African members.

By the time the conference closed in early September, it had agreed a number of recommendations, including that "the Kingdom of Buganda... should continue to be an integral part of the Protectorate; that the conduct of public affairs in Buganda should be in the hands of Ministers; and that, while all the traditional dignities of the Kabaka should be fully safeguarded, Kabakas in future should be constitutional rulers bound by a Solemn Engagement to observe the conditions of the Agreements regarding the Constitution and not to prejudice the security and welfare of the Buganda people and the Protectorate". A number of constitutional changes to the Governments of Uganda and Buganda and to LEGCO were agreed at the same time, increasing African representation, and progressing Cohen's reformist goals. As a result of these changes, Buganda would end its boycott of the reformed LEGCO.

Strictly speaking, the return of Mutesa himself to Uganda was outside the conference's terms of reference. However, the Kampala High Court's finding that the British Government's reliance on Article 6 was "mistaken" – coming shortly after news of the agreement at Namirembe, but before the Agreed Recommendations could be published – put pressure on Cohen to concede. In November, he reversed the British Government's position and agreed to Mutesa's return, contingent on the adoption and implementation of the Namirembe recommendations.

In December a committee was established, chaired by Michael Kintu, to advise the Bugandan Lukiko on whether to accept the Namirembe recommendations. Ultimately, the Kintu Committee supported the recommendations, with a number of proposed amendments: the deferral of local government and succession reforms, and the instigation of direct elections to the Lukiko. The Kintu Committee's report was adopted by the Lukiko on 9 May 1955 by 77 votes to 8 with 1 abstention.

== Agreement ==
Following further negotiations, held in London, the Namirembe recommendations (with minor modifications) were adopted in July 1955 in the form of a new Buganda Agreement that would "supplement and where necessary amend the Agreement of 1900" rather than replace it. The main delay had been caused by a conflict between Mutesa's desire to sign the final agreement in Buganda, and the British view that his agreement was a prerequisite for his return. The solution found was "a transitional Agreement which will run until the main Agreement is signed in Buganda by the Kabaka on his return. This transitional Agreement will be in the same terms as the main Agreement, apart from the transitional provisions, and after approval by the Lukiko will be signed by personal representatives of the Kabaka. Six weeks after the appointment of Buganda Ministers and the Buganda representative members of the Legislative Council under the new arrangements, [the British Government would] authorise the Kabaka to return to Buganda, where he will sign the main Agreement". The transitional Agreement was translated into Luganda and adopted on 15 August 1955.

Following adoption of the new agreement, Mutesa duly returned to Buganda and the main Agreement was duly signed on 18 October. Signatures of the Kabaka, the Governor, and other witnesses appear at the end of the treaty.
