= De Smith =

de Smith may refer to:

- Casey DeSmith (born 1991), American ice hockey goaltender
- Stanley Alexander de Smith (1922–1974), English academic lawyer and author
- DeMaurice Smith (born 1964), the executive director of the National Football League Players Association (NFLPA)
