= Kabaka crisis =

1953 Ugandan political crisis

The Kabaka crisis was a political and constitutional crisis in the Uganda Protectorate between 1953 and 1955. The crisis began when the Kabaka, Mutesa II, pressed for secession of the Kingdom of Buganda from the Uganda Protectorate and was subsequently deposed and exiled by the British governor Andrew Cohen. Widespread discontent with this action forced the British government to backtrack, resulting in the restoration of Mutesa as specified in the Buganda Agreement of 1955, which ultimately shaped the nature of Ugandan independence.

== Background ==
In 1893 the Imperial British East Africa Company (IBEAC) transferred its administration rights over its territories in modern-day Uganda to the British Government. At that time, the IBEAC's territory consisted mainly of the Kingdom of Buganda, which had been acquired in 1892. In 1894 the Uganda Protectorate was established, and, with Bugandan assistance the territory was rapidly extended beyond the borders of Buganda to an area that roughly corresponds to that of present-day Uganda. The Buganda Agreement of 1900 formalised Buganda's place as a constitutional monarchy (headed by the Kabaka) within the broader British-led Protectorate. Following the creation of the Crown Colony of Kenya and Trust Territory of Tanganyika the British grew increasingly interested in the idea of some form of colonial federalism within British East Africa. This resulted, among other things, in the creation of the East Africa High Commission and Central Legislative Assembly in 1948, with competence in certain areas (such as integration of the various railway networks). From 1952 further constitutional reforms were proposed by the new Governor of Uganda, Sir Andrew Cohen. Cohen proposed devolving greater functions from the Protectorate to Buganda, but conditional on Buganda formally accepting its status as a "component part" of the wider Protectorate. Kabaka Mutesa II agreed to this offer, and a joint memorandum was duly published in March 1953.

== Crisis ==
On 30 June 1953, Oliver Lyttelton, the Secretary of State for the Colonies, gave a speech in London in which he made a "passing reference" to the possibility "of still larger measures of unification and possibly still larger measures of federation of the whole East Africa territories". Lyttelton's remarks were reported by the East African Standard on 2 and 3 July, prompting the Ministers of the Bugandan Government (headed by Paulo Kavuma) to write to Cohen on 6 July to stress their opposition to such a plan. The Baganda people, who always valued their autonomy and independence, were alarmed by the idea of a broader federation on the model of the Central African Federation. They felt that such a move would result in the integration of different cultures which would ultimately destroy and engulf their own culture and way of life.

Cohen responded by assuring the Baganda that there was no reason for concern, and that no decision pertaining to the formation of an East African federation would be made without first consulting them. There was a residual feeling in Buganda, however, that Lyttelton had let the cat out of the bag. The incident served to crystallise animosity and apparent slights dating back to the 1900 Agreement, and prompted widespread calls among the Baganda for Bugandan independence as the only protection against British overreach. A reply from the Secretary of State attempting to reassure Mutesa and his Ministers that "the inclusion of the Uganda Protectorate in any such federation is outside the realm of practical politics at the present time" served only to fan the flames. The Bakamas of Bunyoro and Toro, and the Omugabe of Ankole, also wrote to Cohen to express their own fears.

In order to resolve the spiralling crisis, Cohen took a direct approach, choosing to meet Mutesa in person, but a series of six private meetings at Government House did not result in a resolution on the issue of Bugandan independence and the political unrest continued. Frustrated, Cohen told Mutesa that continuing to agitate against the British vision of a single Ugandan state constituted a breach of the 1900 Agreement, as well as a repudiation of the joint declaration of March 1953, and that he had five weeks to reconsider.

Despite the apparent ultimatum, Mutesa, supported by the Bugandan Lukiiko (Parliament) and other neighbouring Kingdoms, continued to push for Buganda secession. This intransigence prompted Cohen to hand him a letter at a final meeting on 30 November 1953 confirming that, under the provisions of Article 6 of the 1900 Agreement, the British Government was withdrawing its recognition of him as the legitimate ruler of Buganda.

Cohen was fearful that this action would incite violent protest by the Baganda and declared a state of emergency. Mutesa was arrested and rapidly exiled to London, much to the shock of the Baganda. He would be permitted to live freely, anywhere in the world, but not to return to Uganda. While his supporters lobbied strongly on his behalf, Mutesa himself behaved "as if on vacation", staying primarily at the Savoy Hotel.

Cohen's preference was for a new Kabaka to be installed immediately, but this proved impossible. Exiling the Kabaka, far from resolving the situation, fuelled it. Resistance in Buganda itself was nevertheless mostly peaceful, including public displays of "weeping, mourning and collapsing in grief... Ganda, and especially Ganda women, declared loyalty to the king and denounced Britain's betrayal of its alliance with Buganda". This emotional response, rooted in the centrality of the Kabaka to Bugandan life rather than the personal popularity of Mutesa, took Cohen by surprise and the British struggled to find a way to counter-act it.

== Resolution ==
Following a well-received Bugandan delegation to London, new negotiations took place in June to September 1954 at Namirembe between Cohen and a constitutional committee selected by the Lukiiko, with Keith Hancock, then Director of the Institute of Commonwealth Studies in London, acting as the mediator. Although an attempt to get the Kabaka's deportation declared ultra vires was unsuccessful, the High Court in Kampala suggested that the use of Article 6 was improper. The British subsequently accepted the return of Mutesa, in exchange for a commitment that he and future Kabakas would make a "solemn engagement" to be bound the 1900 Agreement. A number of constitutional changes within the Government of Buganda and to the national Legislative Council were agreed at the same time, progressing Cohen's reformist goals. Following further negotiations, held in London, the Namirembe conference recommendations were adopted as the Buganda Agreement of 1955 and Mutesa returned triumphant to Buganda.

== General and cited references ==
=== Primary sources ===
- Kavuma, Paulo (1979). Crisis in Buganda, 1953–55: The Story of the Exile and Return of the Kabaka, Mutesa II. London: Collings. ISBN 978-0860360988. OCLC 7556427.
- "Kabaka Mutesa II to Sir Andrew Cohen, 6 August 1953" in Donald Anthony Low (1971). The Mind of Buganda: Documents of the Modern History of an African Kingdom. University of California Press. pp. 163–166. ISBN 978-0-520-01969-0.
- Lyttelton, Oliver (30 November 1953). "Kabaka of Buganda (Withdrawal of Recognition)". Parliamentary Debates (Hansard). House of Commons. col. 780–783.

=== Secondary sources ===
- Apter, David E. (1967). The Political Kingdom in Uganda: A Study in Bureaucratic Nationalism. Routledge. pp. 286–300. ISBN 978-1-136-30757-7.
- Banfield, Jane (1963). "Federation in East Africa". International Journal. 18 (2): 181–193. doi:10.2307/40198786. JSTOR 40198786.
- Low, D.A. (1971). Buganda in Modern History. Berkeley: University of California Press. pp. 108–114. ISBN 978-0520016408.
- Reid, Richard J. (2 March 2017). A History of Modern Uganda. Cambridge University Press. ISBN 978-1-107-06720-2.
- Ssemakula, Mukasa E., ed. (1999). "Background to 1953–55 Crisis". Archived from the original on 7 April 2014.
- Summers, Carol (March 2017) [8 February 2017 (online)]. "All the Kabaka's Wives: Marital Claims in Buganda's 1953–5 Kabaka Crisis". The Journal of African History. 58 (1): 107–127. doi:10.1017/S0021853716000645. ISSN 0021-8537. S2CID 164480221.
