= Sugra Visram =

Ugandan legislator, Member of Parliament and activist

Sugra Namubiru Visram Honourable

National Assembly Representative, Kibuga (1962–1963)

Member of Parliament, Kibuga (1963–1966)

Personal details
- Born: Sugra Jamal Haiderali Visram; 15 July 1923 Nsambya Hospital, Kampala
- Died: 29 October 2012 (aged 89)
- Party: Kabaka Yekka
- Education: Old Kampala Senior Secondary School
- Occupation: Politician; Reproductive Rights activist Teacher

Sugra Visram (15 July 1923 – 29 October 2012), also known as Sugra Namubiru Visram, was a Ugandan politician, activist and businesswoman. She was one of the first female members of parliament co-opted into the Buganda Lukiiko by Kabaka Muteesa II. Affiliated to the Kabaka Yekka Party, she represented Kibuga Constituency (present day Mengo) in Uganda's First and Second Parliaments till she resigned as a member of parliament in 1966. Together with Florence Alice Lubega and Eseza Makumbi, she was one of the first three women to serve in this position in post-independence Uganda.

In 2012, she was awarded the National Independence Medal.

== Background and education ==
She was born Sugra Jamal in Nsambya Hospital to Mohamedali Jamal, of Pakistani origin and Kawkab Aha Mirza of Iranian descent. She grew up in Mengo and Old Kampala and she studied at Old Kampala Senior Secondary School.

== Career ==
Much as she worked with her husband, Visram also ran a clothing shop and started a driving school for women. Between 1950 and 1951, she was the headmistress the Ithnasheri School, a nursery school.

Visram joined politics in 1962 and in that year's pre-independence Buganda elections, Visram along with Florence Alice Lubega and Eseza Makumbi, were elected to the Lukiiko. After the 1962 Ugandan general elections, she was nominated to the Independence National Assembly of 1962 to 1966 to serve as a representative from Buganda still with Florence Alice Lubega thus making them the first female members of this body. She was affiliated to the Kabaka Yekka (KY) party and represented the constituency known as "Kibuga" (present day Mengo).

Visram was one of five Kabaka Yekka legislators who resigned their parliamentary seats after she declined to subscribe to the provisions of a new constitution that was presented after the 1966 constitutional coup in Uganda.

She was head of the Women's Wing of Kabaka Yekka (KY) in addition to being the Vice Chair of the Uganda Council for Women which she joined in 1944. She was one of the founders of the Family Planning Association of Uganda (currently known as Reproductive Health Uganda) in 1957. She also helped found the Young Women's Christian Association (YWCA) in Uganda and was its treasurer.

=== Post 1972 expulsion ===
After the expulsion of Asians from Uganda in 1972, Visram worked in the Education department of the Commonwealth Institute. She was also active in the Commonwealth Parliamentary Association and the Red Cross.

She came back to Uganda in 1993 and worked as a Special Presidential Assistant on Inward Investment.

== Personal life ==
In 1941, Visram married Haider Visram, a grandson of Allidina Visram. He died in 1998 and they had three children.

She was adopted into the Buganda Mamba clan and given the name Namubiru.

Visram left Uganda in 1972 after President Idi Amin's expulsion of Asians from Uganda.

== See also ==
- Milton Obote
- Florence Alice Nalubega
