= Visram =

Visram is a surname. Notable people with the surname include:

- Allidina Visram (1851–1916), Indian settler
- Shazi Visram (born 1976), American entrepreneur
- Sugra Visram (1923–2012), Ugandan politician
