= Bishrampur =

Bishrampur may refer to:

- Bishrampur, Agra, India
- Bishrampur, Chhattisgarh, India
- Bishrampur, Jharkhand, India
  - Bishrampur Assembly constituency
  - Bishrampur block
- Bishrampur, Bara, Nepal
- Bishrampur, Rautahat, Nepal
- Bisrampur, Nepal

== See also ==
- Visram, a surname
- Pur (disambiguation)
- Bisram, an Indian poet
- Bisram Khan, a Mughal-era Indian poet
