= Malawan, Etah =

Village in Uttar Pradesh, India

Malawan
- Village
- Location in Uttar Pradesh, India
- Coordinates: 27.47364°N 78.83219°E
- Country: India
- State: Uttar Pradesh
- District: Etah
- Tehsil: Etah

Area
  - Total: 11.371 km^{2} (4.390 sq mi)

Population (2011)
  - Total: 8,220
  - Density: 723/km^{2} (1,870/sq mi)
- Time zone: UTC+5:30 (IST)

Malawan (Malāwan) is a village in Sakit block of Etah district, Uttar Pradesh. There is a small crescent-shaped lake to the east of the village, and east of that is an old archaeological mound associated with the Ochre Coloured Pottery culture. As of 2011, Malawan has a population of 8,220, in 1,424 households.

== Archaeology ==
About 1.5 km east of Malawan, at the eastern tip of a small crescent-shaped lake, is an archaeological mound where several pottery shards associated with the Ochre Coloured Pottery culture were found. On the north and northeast sides of the mound, there is a broad depression, which the ancient inhabitants likely used for agriculture.

== History ==
Malawan was historically one of the main villages in pargana Sonhar. malawan was also a zamindari state ?-1947 (title abolished) it was ruled by late thakur maharaj singh chauhan later. it was ruled by late. Thakur narsingh bhansingh chauhan after his death it was ruled by his son late. Thakur jogendra pal singh chauhan (till 1947) later, on title of zamindaar abolished.later also he is the main person of village till his death later he donated his farms to his servants and other people of villages his family is still living in malawan in haveli . At the turn of the 20th century, it was described as a purely agricultural village, with no commercial or industrial significance. It had a dak bungalow, an upper primary school (with an average attendance of 32 as of 1908), and a branch post office at that point, and it was also the site of a British military encampment. As of 1901, Malawan had a population of 2,472.

== Demographics ==
As of 2011, Malawan had a population of 8,220, in 1,424 households. This population was 53.6% male (4,406) and 46.4% female (3,814). The 0-6 age group numbered 1,317 (675 male and 642 female), making up 16.0% of the total population. 1,628 residents were members of Scheduled Castes, or 19.8% of the total.

The 1981 census recorded Malawan as having a population of 4,750 people (2,596 male and 2,154 female), in 867 households and 867 physical houses.

The 1961 census recorded Malawan as comprising 7 hamlets, with a total population of 3,529 people (1,910 male and 1,619 female), in 693 households and 405 physical houses. The area of the village was given as 2,810 acres and it had a post office at that point.

== Infrastructure ==
As of 2011, Malawan had 4 primary schools and 1 primary health centre. Drinking water was provided by hand pump and tube well/borehole; there were no public toilets. The village had a post office and public library, as well as at least some access to electricity for residential and agricultural (but not commercial) purposes. Streets were made of kachcha materials.

== See also ==
- Birahimpur Sakit: a nearby village with a similar archaeological site
