= Sakit =

- Town
- Location in Uttar Pradesh, India
- Coordinates: 27.45°N 78.82°E
- Country: India
- State: Uttar Pradesh
- District: Etah
- Elevation: 170 m (560 ft)

Population (2001)
  - Total: 6,934

Languages
  - Official: Hindi
- Time zone: UTC+5:30 (IST)
- Postal code: 207121

Sakit is a town and a Nagar panchayat in the Etah district of the Indian state of Uttar Pradesh.

== Demographics ==
As of the 2001 India census, Sakit had a population of 6934. Males constituted 53% of the population and females 47%. Sakit has an average literacy rate of 54%, lower than the national average of 59.5%: male literacy is 61%, and female literacy is 46%. 21% of the population is under 6 years of age.

== Schools ==
This town has many schools for young children, which kids from nearby villages also attend. Despite having many schools, education level and quality are still low. Apart from elementary and secondary education, however, this town has little to offer in schooling; it possesses only one Inter college, the D.A.V. Inter college, with a total capacity of 1500 students established by Mr. Hanuman Sahay Johri. Another good school is "Digamber Jain Bal Vidya Mandir".

== History ==
Sakit is an ancient garrison town, according to the local legend Shakti Singh alias Sakat Singh founded the town in his name and built the fort which is in ruined condition now, presently Police Station of Sakit is situated in the fort, and on the other side of fort few unauthorized occupants are living there. The ruins of a Mosque in the fort have three very important stone inscription stating the building of the Mosque one inscription belongs to the period of Sultan Ghiyasuddin Balban(1266 to 1287 CE) another belongs to Shershah Suri (1540 to 1545 CE) and the third one belongs to Akbar.

== Villages ==
- Birahimpur Sakit
- Malawan
