= Paulo Kavuma =

Ugandan politician

- Born: Paulo Kavuma; Uganda
- Occupations: politician, administrator
- Known for: Politics, public administration

Paulo Neil Kavuma OBE (1901–1989) was a Ugandan politician and administrator. Between 1950 and 1955 he served as katikkiro (chief minister) to the then Kabaka of Buganda, Mutesa II, playing crucial roles in the resolution of the Kabaka crisis during the mid-20th century. He recorded his account of the events of the crisis in a book, Crisis in Buganda, 1953–55 (1979). During the Kabaka Crisis he was the central figure in the resolution which occurred after the British Colonial government exiled Mutesa II.

== See also ==
- Michael Kintu
- steven kavuma
