= Buganda Agreement (1900) =

1900 agreement between Uganda and Buganda

The Buganda Agreement (1900), signed in March 1900, formed the basis of British relations with the Kingdom of Buganda. The Kabaka of Buganda was recognised as ruler of the kingdom as long he remained faithful to the British monarch, and the Lukiiko (council of chiefs) was given statutory recognition. This was following another agreement signed in 1894 in which Buganda, then known as Uganda, was declared a British protectorate. This agreement is also known as the Buganda Charter of Rights and was upheld for more than 50 years.

== Text of the Buganda Agreement of 1900 ==
Buganda Agreement of 1900
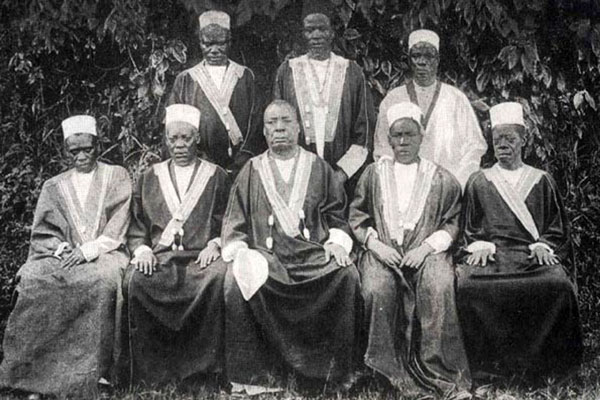
- Uganda Kingdom Officials, 1890s
- Signed: March 10, 1900
- Location: Mengo
- Negotiators: Alfred Robert Tucker
- Signatories: H.H. Johnston; Apollo Kagwa; Stanislaus Mugwanya; Mbogo Noho; Zakaria Kizito
- Parties: Kingdom of Uganda; United Kingdom
- Languages: Luganda and English

The Buganda Agreement, 1900 (See Native Agreement and Buganda Native Laws, Laws of the Uganda Protectorate, Revised Edition 1935 Vol. VI, pp. 1373–1384; Laws of Uganda 1951 Revised Edition, Vol. VI, pp. 12–26)

We, the undersigned, to wit, Sir Henry Hamilton Johnston, K.C.B., Her Majesty's Special Commissioner, Commander-in -Chief and Consul-General for the Uganda Protectorate and the adjoining Territories, on behalf of Her Majesty the Queen of Great Britain and Ireland, Empress of India, on the one part; and the under mentioned Regents and Chiefs of the Kingdom of Uganda on behalf of the Kabaka (King) of Uganda, and the chiefs and people of Uganda, on the other part: do hereby agree to the following Articles relative to the government and administration of the Kingdom of Uganda.

1. The boundaries of the Kingdom of Uganda shall be the following: starting from the left bank of the Victoria Nile at the Ripon Falls, the boundary shall follow the left bank of the Victoria Nile into Lake Kioga, and then shall be continued along the centre of Lake Kioga, and again along the Victoria Nile as far as the confluence of the River Kafu, opposite the town of Mruli.

From this point the boundary shall he carried along the right or eastern bank of the River Kafu, up stream, as far as the junction of the Kafu and Embaia. From this point the boundary shall be carried in a straight line to the River Nkusi, and shall follow the left bank of the River Nkusi down stream to its entrance into the Albert Nyanza. The boundary shall then be carried along the coast of the Albert Nyanza in a south-western direction as far as the mouth of the River Kuzizi, and then shall be carried up stream along the right bank of the River Kuzizi and near its source.

From a point near the source of the Kuzizi and near the village of Kirola (such point to be finally determined by Her Majesty's Commissioner at the time of the definite survey of Uganda) the boundary shall be carried in a south-western direction until it reaches the River Nabutari, the left bank of which it will follow down stream to its confluence with the River Katonga; The boundary shall be carried in a southwestern direction until it reaches the River Nabutari, the left bank of which it will follow down stream to its confluence with the River Katonga; The boundary shall then be carried up stream along the left confluence of the Chungaga, after which, crossing the Katonga, the boundary shall be carried along the right bank of the said Chungaga river, up stream to its source; and from its source the boundary shall be drawn in a south-eastern direction to the point where the Byoloba River enters Lake Kachira; and shall then be continued along the centre of Lake Kachira to its south-eastern extremity, where the River Bukova leaves the lake, from which point the boundary shall be carried in a south-eastern direction to the Anglo-German frontier.

The boundary shall then follow the Anglo-German frontier to the coast of the Victoria Nyanza and then shall be drawn across the waters of the Victoria Nyanza in such a manner as to include within the limits of the Kingdom of Uganda the Sese Archipelago (including Kosi and Mazinga), Ugaya, Lufu, Igwe, Buvuma, and Lingira Islands. The boundary, after including Lingira Islands, shall be carried through Napoleon Gulf until it reaches the starting point of its definition at Bugungu at the Ripon Falls on the Victoria Nile. To avoid any misconception, it is intended by this definition to include within the boundaries of Uganda all the islands lying off the north-west coast of the Victoria Nyanza in addition to those specially mentioned.

2. The Kabaka and Chiefs of Uganda hereby agree henceforth to renounce in favour of Her Majesty the Queen any claims to tribute they may have had on the adjoining provinces of the Uganda Protectorate.

3. The Kingdom of Uganda in the administration of the Uganda Protectorate shall rank as a province of equal rank with any other provinces into which the protectorate may be divided.

4. The revenue of the Kingdom of Uganda, collected by the Uganda Administration, will be merged in the general revenue of the Uganda Protectorate, as with that of the other provinces of this Protectorate.

5. The laws made for the general governance of the Uganda Protectorate by Her Majesty's Government will be equally applicable to the Kingdom of Uganda, except in so far as they may in any particular conflict with the terms of this agreement, in which case the terms of this Agreement will constitute a special exception in regard to the Kingdom of Uganda.

6. So long as the Kabaka, chiefs, and people of Uganda shall conform to the laws and regulations instituted for their governance by Her Majesty's Government, and shall cooperate loyally with Her Majesty's Government in the organisation and administration of the said Kingdom of Uganda, Her Majesty's Government agrees to recognise the Kabaka of Uganda as the native ruler of the province of Uganda under Her Majesty's protection and over-rule.

The King of Uganda shall henceforth be styled His Highness the Kabaka of Uganda. On the death of a Kabaka, his successor shall be elected by a majority of votes in the Lukiiko, or native council. The range of selection, however, must be limited to the Royal Family of Uganda, that is to say, to the descendants of King Muteesa.

The name of the person chosen by the native council must be submitted to Her Majesty's Government for approval, and no person shall be recognised as Kabaka of Uganda whose election has not received the approval of Her Majesty's Government. The Kabaka of Uganda shall exercise direct rule over the natives of Uganda, to who he shall administer justice through the Lukiiko, or native council, and through others of his officers in the manner approved by Her Majesty's Government. The jurisdiction of the native Court of the Kabaka of Uganda, however, shall not extend to any person not a native of the Uganda province.

The Kabaka's Courts shall be entitled to try natives for capital crimes, but no death sentence may be carried out by the Kabaka, or his Courts, without the sanction of Her Majesty's representative in Uganda. Moreover, there will be a right of appeal from the native Courts to the principal Court of Justice established by Her Majesty in the Kingdom of Uganda as regards all sentences which inflict a term of more than five years' imprisonment or a fine of over £100.

In the case of any other sentences imposed by the Kabaka's Courts, which may seem to Her Majesty's Government disproportioned or inconsistent with humane principles, Her Majesty's representative in Uganda shall have the right of remonstrance with the Kabaka, who, shall at the request of the said representative, subject such sentence to reconsideration.

The Kabaka of Uganda shall be guaranteed by Her Majesty's Government from out of the local revenue of the Uganda Protectorate a minimum yearly allowance of £1,500 a year. During the present Kabaka's minority, however, in lieu of the above-mentioned subvention, there will be paid to the master of his household, to meet his household expenditure, £650 a year, and during his minority the three persons appointed to act as Regents will receive an annual salary of £400 a year. Kabakas of Uganda will be understood to have attained their majority when they have reached the age of I8 years. The Kabaka of Uganda shall be entitled to a salute of nine guns on ceremonial occasions when such salutes are customary.

7. The Namasole, or mother of the present Kabaka (Chwa), shall be paid during her lifetime an allowance at that rate of £50 a year. This allowance shall not necessarily be continued to the mothers of other Kabakas.

8. All cases, civil or criminal, of a mixed nature, where natives of the Uganda province and non-natives of that province are concerned, shall be subject to British Courts of Justice only.

9. For purposes of native administration the Kingdom of Uganda shall be divided into the following districts or administrative counties:

(1) Kyaggwe (11) Butambala (Bweya) (2) Bugerere (12) Kyadondo (3) Bulemezi (13) Busiro (4) Buruli (14)Mawokota (5) Bugangadzi (15) Buvuma (6) Bwekula (16) Ssese (7) Singo (17) Buddu (8) Busuju (18) Kooki (9) Gomba (Butunzi). (19) Mawogola (10)Buyaga (20) Kabula

At the head of each county shall be placed a chief who shall be selected by the Kabaka's Government, but whose name shall be submitted for approval to Her Majesty's representative. This chief, when approved by Her Majesty' s representative, shall be guaranteed from out of the revenue of Uganda a salary at the rate of £200 a year. To the chief of a county will be entrusted by Her Majesty's Government, and by the Kabaka, the task of administering justice amongst the natives dwelling in his county, the assessment and collection of taxes, the up-keep of the main road, and the general supervision of native affairs.

On all questions but the assessment and collection of taxes the chief of the county will report direct to the King's native Ministers, from whom he will receive his instructions. When arrangements have been made by Her Majesty's Government for the organization of a police force in the province of Uganda, a certain number of police will be placed at the disposal of each chief of a county to assist him in maintaining order.

For the assessment and payment of taxes, the chief of a county shall be immediately responsible to Her Majesty's representative, and should he fail in his duties in this respect, Her Majesty's representative shall have the right to call upon the Kabaka to dismiss him from his duties and to appoint another chief in his stead. In each county an estate, not exceeding an area of 8 square miles, shall be attributed to the chieftainship of a county, and its usufruct shall be enjoyed by the person occupying, for the time being, the position of chief of the county.

10. To assist the Kabaka of Uganda in the Government of his people he shall be allowed to appoint three native officers of state, with the sanction and approval of Her Majesty's representative in Uganda (without whose sanction such appointments shall not be valid)- A Prime Minister, otherwise known as Katikkiro; a Chief Justice; and a Treasurer or Controller of the Kabaka's revenues. These officials shall he paid at the rate of £300 a year. Their salaries shall be guaranteed them by Her Majesty's Government from out of the funds of the Uganda Protectorate.

During the minority of the Kabaka these three officials shall be constituted the Regents, and when acting in that capacity shall receive salary at the rate of £400 a year. Her Majesty's chief representative in Uganda shall at any time have direct access to the Kabaka and shall have the powers of discussing matters affecting Uganda with the Kabaka alone or, during his minority, with the Regents; but ordinarily the three officials above designated will transact most of the Kabaka' business with the Uganda Administration.

The Katikkiro shall be the ex-officio President of the Lukiiko, or native council; the VicePresident of the Lukiiko shall be the native Minister of justice for the time being; in the absence of both Prime Minister and Minister of Justice, the Treasurer of the Kabaka's revenues, or third minister, shall preside over the meetings of the Lukiiko.

11. The Lukiko, or native council, shall be constituted as follows:

In addition to the three native ministers who shall be ex-officio senior members of the council, each chief of a county (twenty in all) shall be ex-officio a member of the council. Also each chief of a county shall be permitted to appoint a person to act as his lieutenant in this respect to attend the meetings of the council during his absence, and to speak and vote in his name. The chief of a county, however, and his lieutenant may not both appear simultaneously at the council.

In addition the Kabaka shall select from each county three notables, whom he shall appoint during his pleasure to be members of the Lukiko or native council- The Kabaka may also, in addition to the foregoing, appoint six other persons of importance in the country to be members of the native council. The Kabaka may at any time deprive any individual of the right to sit on the native council but in such a case shall intimate his intention to Her Majesty's representative in Uganda, and receive his assent thereto before dismissing the member.

The functions of the council will be to discuss all matters concerning the native administration of Uganda, and to forward to the Kabaka resolutions which may be voted by a majority regarding measures to be adopted by the said administration. The Kabaka shall further consult with Her Majesty's representative in Uganda before giving effect to any such resolutions voted by the native council, and shall, in this matter, explicitly follow the advice of Her Majesty's representative.

The Lukiko, or a committee thereof, shall be a Court of Appeal from the decisions of the Courts of First instances held by the chiefs of counties. In all cases affecting property exceeding the value of £5, or imprisonment exceeding one week, an appeal for revision may be addressed to the Lukiko. In all cases involving property or claims exceeding £100 in value, or sentences of death, the Lukiko shall refer the matter to the consideration of the Kabaka, whose decision when countersigned by Her Majesty's chief representative in Uganda shall be final.

The Lukiko shall not decide any questions affecting the persons or property of Europeans or others who are not natives of Uganda. No person may be elected to the Lukiko who is not a native of the Kingdom of Uganda. No question of religious opinion shall be taken into consideration in regard to the appointment by the Kabaka of members of the council. In this matter he shall use his judgment and abide by the advice of Her Majesty's representation of assuring in this manner a fair proportionate representation of all recognised expressions of religious beliefs prevailing in Uganda.

12. In order to contribute to a reasonable extent towards the general cost of the maintenance of the Uganda Protectorate, there shall be established the following taxation for Imperial purposes, that is to say, the proceeds of the collection of these taxes shall be handed over intact to Her Majesty's representative in Uganda as the contribution of the Uganda province towards the general revenue of the Protectorate.

The taxes agreed upon at present shall be the following:

- A hut tax of three rupees, or 4s per annum on any house, hut, or habitation, used as a dwelling-place.
- A gun tax of three rupees, or 4s per annum, to be paid by any person who possesses or uses a gun, rifle, or pistol.

The Kingdom of Uganda shall be subject to the same Customs Regulations, Porter Regulations, and so forth, which may, with the approval of Her Majesty, be instituted for the Uganda Protectorate generally, which may be described in a sense as exterior taxation, but no further interior taxation, other than the hut tax, shall be imposed on the natives of the province of Uganda without the agreement of the Kabaka, who in this matter shall be guided by the majority of votes in his native council.

This arrangement, however, will not affect the question of township rates, lighting rates, water rates, market dues, and so forth, which may be treated apart as matters affecting municipalities or townships; nor will it absolve natives from obligations as regards military service, or the up-keep of main roads passing through the lands on which they dwell. A hut tax shall be levied on any building which is used as a dwelling place. A collection of not more than four huts however, which, are in separate and single enclosure and are inhabited only by a man and his wife, or wives, be counted as one hut.

The following buildings will be exempted from the hut tax: temporary shelters erected in fields for the purpose of watching plantations; or rest houses in the fields for the purpose of watching plantations; or rest houses erected by the roadside for passing travellers; buildings used solely as tombs, churches, mosques. or schools, and not slept in or occupied as a dwelling; the residence of the Kabaka and his household (not to exceed Fifty buildings in number); the residence of the Namasole, or Queen Mother (not to exceed twenty in number); the official residences of the three native ministers, and of all the chiefs of counties (not to exceed ten buildings in number); but in the case of dispute as to the liability of a building to pay hut tax, the matter must be referred to the Collector for the province of Uganda, whose decision must be final.

The Collector of province may also authorise the chief of a county to exempt from taxation any person whose condition of destitution may, in the opinion of the Collector is meant the principal British official representing the Uganda Administration in the province of Uganda. The representative of Her Majesty's Government in the Uganda Protectorate may from time to time direct that in the absence of current coin, a hut or gun tax may be paid in produce or in labour according to a scale which shall be laid down by the said representative. As regards the gun tax, it will be held to apply to any person who possesses or makes use of a gun, rifle, pistol, or any weapon discharging a projectile by the aid of gunpowder, dynamite, or compressed air.

The possession of any Canon or machine gun is hereby forbidden to any native of Uganda. A native who pays a gun tax may possess or use as many as five guns. For every five or for every additional gun up to five, which he may be allowed to possess or use, he will have to pay another tax. Exemptions from the gun tax will, however, be allowed to the following extent:

The Kabaka will be credited with fifty gun licences free, by which he may arm as many as fifty of his household. The Queen Mother will, in like manner, be granted ten free licences annually, by which she may arm as many as ten persons of her household; each of the three native ministers (Katikiro, Native Chief Justice, the Treasurer of the Kabaka's revenue) shall be granted twenty free gun licences annually; by which they may severally arm twenty persons of their household.

Chiefs of counties will be similarly granted ten annual free gun licences; all other members of the Lukiko or native council not chiefs of counties, three annual gun licences, and all landed proprietors in the country with estates exceeding 500 acres in extent, one free annual gun licence.

13. Nothing in this Agreement shall be held to invalidate the pre-existing right of the Kabaka of Uganda to call upon every able bodied male among his subjects for military service in defence of the country; but the Kabaka henceforth will only exercise this right of conscription, or of levying native troops, under the advice of Her Majesty's principal representative in the Protectorate.

In times of peace, the armed forces, organised by the Uganda Administration will probably be sufficient for all purposes of defence; but if Her Majesty' representative is of the opinion that the force of Uganda should be strengthened at the time, he may call upon the Kabaka to exercise in a full or in modified degree his claim on the Baganda people for military service. In such an event the arming and equipping of such force would be undertaken by the administration of the Uganda Protectorate.

14. All main public roads traversing the Kingdom of Uganda, and all roads, the making of which shall at any time be decreed by the native council with the assent of her Majesty's representative shall be maintained in good repair by the chiefs of the saza (or county) through which the road runs.

The chief of a county shall have the right to call upon each native town, village, or commune, to furnish labourers in the proportion of one to every three huts or houses, to assist in keeping the established roads in repair, provided that no labourers shall be called upon to work on the roads for more than one month in each year. Europeans and all foreigners whose land abut on established main roads will be assessed by the Uganda Administration and required to furnish either labour or to pay labour rate in money as their contribution rewards, the maintenance of the highways. When circumstances permit, the Ugandan Administration may further make grants from out of its Public Works Department for the construction of new roads or any special repairs to existing highways, of an unusual expensive character.

15. The land of the Kingdom of Uganda shall he dealt with in the following manner:

Assuming the area of the Kingdom of Uganda, as comprised within the limits cited in the agreement, to amount to 19,600 square miles, it shall be divided in the following proportions:

Forests to be brought under control of the Uganda Administration 1500 square miles

Waste and uncultivated land to be vested in Her Majesty's Government to be controlled by the Uganda Administration 9,000 square miles

Plantations and other private property of His Highness the Kabaka of Uganda 350 square miles

Plantations and other private property of the Namasole 16 square miles (NOTE: - If the present Kabaka died and another Namasole were appointed, the existing one would be permitted to retain as her personal property 6 square miles, passing on 10 square miles as the endowment of every succeeding Namasole.)

Plantation and other private property of the Namasole, mother of Mwanga 10 square miles To the Princes: Joseph, Augustine, Ramazan, and Yusufu-Suna, 8 square miles each 32 square miles

For the Princesses, sisters, and relations of the Kabaka 90 square miles

To the Abamasaza (chiefs of counties) twenty in all, 8 square miles each (Private property) 160 square miles

Official estates attached to the posts of the Abamasaza, 8 square miles each 320 square miles

The three Regents will receive private property to the extent of 6 square miles each 48 square miles

And official property attached to their office, 16 square miles, the said official property to be afterwards attached to the posts of the three native ministers 48 96

Mbogo (the Muhammedan chief) will receive for Himself and his adherents 24 square miles

Kamuswaga, chief of Koki with receive. 20 square miles

One thousand chiefs and private landowners will receive the estates of which they are already in possession, and which are computed at an average of 8 square miles per individual, making a total of 8,000 square miles

There will be allotted to the three missionary societies in existence in Uganda as private property, and in trust for the native churches, as much as 92 square miles

Land taken up by the Government for Government stations prior to the present settlement (at Kampala, Entebbe, Masaka etc. etc.) 50 square miles

Total 19,600 square miles

After a careful survey of the Kingdom of Uganda has been made, if the total area should be found to be e less than 19,600 then the portion of the country which is to be vested in Her Majesty's Government shall be reduced in extent by the deficiency found to exist in the estimated area. Should, however, the area of Uganda be established at more than 19,600 square miles, then the surplus shall be dealt with as follows:

It shall be divided into two parts, one-half shall be added to the amount of land which is vested in Her Majesty's Government and the other half shall be divided proportionately among the properties of the Kabaka, the three Regents or native ministers, and the Abamasaza, or chiefs of counties.

The aforesaid 9,000 square miles of waste or cultivated, or uncultivated land, or land occupied without prior gift of the Kabaka or chiefs by bakopi or strangers, are hereby vested in Her Majesty the Queen of Great Britain and Ireland, Empress of India, and Protectress of Uganda, on the understanding that the revenue derived from such lands shall form part of the general revenue of the Uganda Protectorate.

The forests, which will be reserved for Government control, will be, as a rule, those forests over which no private claim can be raised justifiably, and will be forests of some continuity which should be maintained as woodland in the general interests of the country.

As regards the allotment of the 8,000 square miles among the 1,000 private landowners, this will be a matter to be left to the decision of the Lukiko, with an appeal to the Kabaka. The Lukiko will be empowered to decide as to the validity of claims, the number of claimants and the extent of land granted, premising that the total amount of land thus allotted amongst the chiefs and accorded to native landowners of the Country is not to exceed 8,000 square miles.

Europeans and non-natives, who have acquired estates, and whose claims thereto have been admitted by the Uganda Administration, will receive title-deeds for such, estates in such manner and with such limitations, as may be formulated by Her Majesty's representative.

The official estates granted to the Regents, native ministers, or chiefs of counties, are to pass with the office, and their use is only to be enjoyed by the holders of the office.

Her Majesty's Government, however, reserves to itself the right to carry through or construct roads, railways, canals, telegraphs, or other useful public works, or to build military forts or works of defence on any property, public or private, with the condition that not more than 10 per centum of the property in question shall be taken up for these purposes without compensation, and that compensation shall be given for the disturbance of growing crops or of buildings.

16. Until Her Majesty's Government has seen fit to devise and promulgate forestry regulation, it is not possible in this Agreement to define such forest rights as may be given to the natives of Uganda; but it is agreed on behalf of Her Majesty's Government, that in arranging these forestry regulations, the claims of the Baganda people to obtain timber for building purposes, firewood, and other products of the forests or uncultivated lands, shall be taken into account, and arrangements made by which under due safeguards against abuse these rights may be exercised gratis.

17. As regards mineral rights. The rights to all minerals found on private estates shall be considered to belong only to the owners of those estates, subject to a 10 per centum ad valorem duty, which will be paid to the Uganda Administration when the minerals are worked. On the land outside private estates, the mineral rights shall belong to the Uganda Administration, which, however, in return for using or disposing of the same must compensate the occupier of the soil for the disturbance of growing crops or building, and will be liable to allot to him from out of the spare lands in the Protectorate an equal area of soil to that from which he has been removed. On these waste and uncultivated lands the Protectorate, the mineral rights shall be vested in Her Majesty's Government as represented by the Uganda Administration. In like manner the ownership of the forests, which are not included within the limits of private properties, shall be henceforth vested in Her Majesty's Government.

18. In return for the cession to Her Majesty's Government of the right of control over 10,550 square miles of waste, cultivated, uncultivated, or forest lands, there shall be paid by Her Majesty's Government in trust for the Kabaka (upon his attaining his majority) a sum of £50O, and to the three Regents collectively, £600, namely, to the Katikiro £300, and the other two Regents £150 each.

19. Her Majesty's Government agrees to pay to the Muhammedan Uganda chief, Mbogo, a pension for life of £250 a year, on the understanding that all rights which he may claim (except such as are guaranteed in the foregoing clauses) are ceded to Her Majesty's Government.

20. Should the Kingdom of Uganda fail to pay to the Uganda Administration during the first two years after the signing of this Agreement, an amount of native taxation, equal to half that which is due in proportion to the number of inhabitants; or should it at any time fail to pay without just cause or excuse, the aforesaid minimum of taxation due in proportion to the population; or should the Kabaka, chiefs, or people of Uganda, pursue, at any time, a policy which is distinctly disloyal to the British Protectorate; Her Majesty's Government will no longer consider themselves bound by the terms of this Agreement.

On the other hand, should the revenue derived from the hut and gun tax exceed two years running a total value of £45,000 a year, the Kabaka and chiefs of counties shall have the right to appeal to Her Majesty's Government for an increase in the subsidy given to the Kabaka, and the stipends given to the native ministers and chiefs, such increase to be in the same proportional relation as the increase in the revenue derived from the taxation of the natives.

21. Throughout this Agreement the phrase "Uganda Administration" shall be taken to mean that general Government of the Uganda Protectorate, which is instituted and maintained by Her Majesty's Government; " Her Majesty's representative" shall mean the Commissioner, High Commissioner, Governor, or principal official of any designation who is appointed by Her Majesty's Government to direct the affairs of Uganda.

22. In the interpretation of this Agreement the English text shall be the version which is binding on both parties.

Done in English and Luganda at Mengo, in the Kingdom of Uganda, on the 10th March 1900.

H.H JOHNSTON, Her Majesty's Special Commissioner, Commander in Chief and ConsulGeneral, on behalf of Her Majesty the Queen of Great Britain and Ireland, Empress of India.

(Seal) APOLLO, Katikiro, Regent. MUGWANYA, Katikiro Regent. MBOGO NOHO, his X mark. ZAKARIA KIZITO, Kangawo. Regent, SEBAUA, Pokino. YAKOBO, Kago. PAULO, Mukwenda. KAMUSWAGA, of Koki, his X mark.

(On behalf of the Kabaka, chief, and people of Uganda) Witness to the above signatures: F.J. JACKSON, Her Majesty's Vice-Consul. J. EVATT, Lieutenant-Colonel. JAMES FRANCIS CUNNINGHAM ALFRED R. TUCKER, Bishop of Uganda. HENRY HANLON, Vicar Apostolic of the Upper Nile, E BRESSON (for Mgr. Streicher, White Fathers). R. H. WALKER. MATAYO, Mujasi. LATUSA, Sekibobo. MATAYO, Kaima. YOKANA, Kitunzi. SANTI SEMINDI, Kasuju. ANDEREA, Kimbugwe SEREME, Mujasi, COPRIEN LUWEKULA. NOVA, Jumba, Gabunga. FERINDI, Kyabalongo SAULO, Lumana. YOKANO BUNJO, Katikiro, of Namasole. YOSEFU, Katambalwa. ZAKAYO, Kivate, HEZIKIYA, Namutwe. ALI, Mwenda, NSELWANO, Muwemba. SEMIONI SEBUTA, Mutengesa. NJOVU YUSUFU Kitambala, his X mark. KATA, Nsege.

The Uganda Agreement (alternatively the Treaty of Mengo) of March 1900 formalized the relationship between the Kingdom of Uganda and the British Uganda Protectorate. It was amended by the Buganda Agreement of 1955 and Buganda Agreement of 1961.

== Background ==
Prior to 1894, the local African political entities consisted of either chieftainships or kingdoms. The area that has been known as Uganda since the reign of King Sunna, was inhabited by many ethnic groups with distinct languages, cultures, traditions, and socio-political systems, the Kingdom of Uganda being the most powerful political entity in the region.

The first direct contact between Uganda and the outside world came with the arrival of Arab Muslim traders from Zanzibar in 1884. In 1877, the first missionaries from the Anglican Church of England arrived in Buganda, followed by the Roman Catholics two years later. It was notable that the British colonial officials entered Uganda through a centralized kingdom rather than through a succession of disconnected societies, as they had elsewhere in eastern Africa.

Their arrival in Uganda was complicated by the presence of Catholic and Protestant missionaries and the ensuing Buganda succession war of 1888-1892. This religious-inspired civil war coincided with the imperial ambitions of Britain, which was trying to secure Uganda as its colony because of its importance with regard to access to the Nile. During the war, British colonial officials, following chief agent Captain Frederick Lugard of the Imperial British East Africa Company (IBEAC), lent their support to the Protestant faction led by chief minister (Katikiro) Apollo Kagwa. Soon, the IBEAC relinquished its control over Uganda after the wars had driven it into bankruptcy.

At the request of Sir Gerald Portal, Alfred Tucker, Bishop of Eastern Equatorial Africa and later Bishop of Uganda, urged the British authorities to take over Uganda. On May 29, 1893, a treaty between Portal and Kabaka Mwanga informally ensured Uganda as a British Protectorate. On August 27, 1894, Mwanga was compelled to sign another treaty with Colonel H.E. Colvile, who encouraged conventional takeover of the territory. Though the 1893 and 1894 treaties had been undertaken because, as stipulated by the Berlin Conference, Uganda happened to fall within the British sphere of influence, Britain lacked the sanctity of traditional rulers and their peoples. It was important that an agreement, as opposed to a treaty, be undertaken so that British rule would become de jure as opposed to being de facto.

== Agreement ==
The agreement was negotiated by Alfred Tucker, Bishop of Uganda, and signed by, among others, Buganda's Katikiro Apollo Kagwa, on the behalf of the Kabaka (Daudi Cwa II), who was at that time an infant, and Sir Harry Johnston on the behalf of the British colonial government.

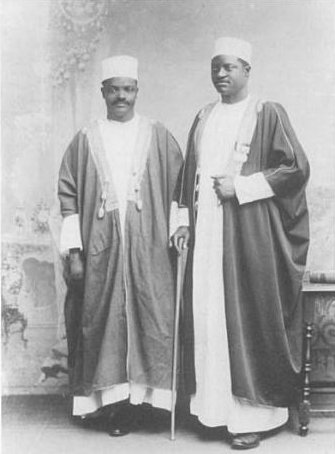
Apolo Kagwa (right) with his secretary Ham Mukasa, 1902

Buganda would henceforth be a province of the Protectorate, and would be transformed into a constitutional monarchy with the power of the Lukiiko (advisory council) greatly enhanced and the role of the Kabaka reduced. The British also gained the right to veto future choices of the Kabaka, and control of numerous other appointments. These provisions concerning the roles of the Kabaka and Lukiiko were largely reversed by the Buganda Agreement of 1961.

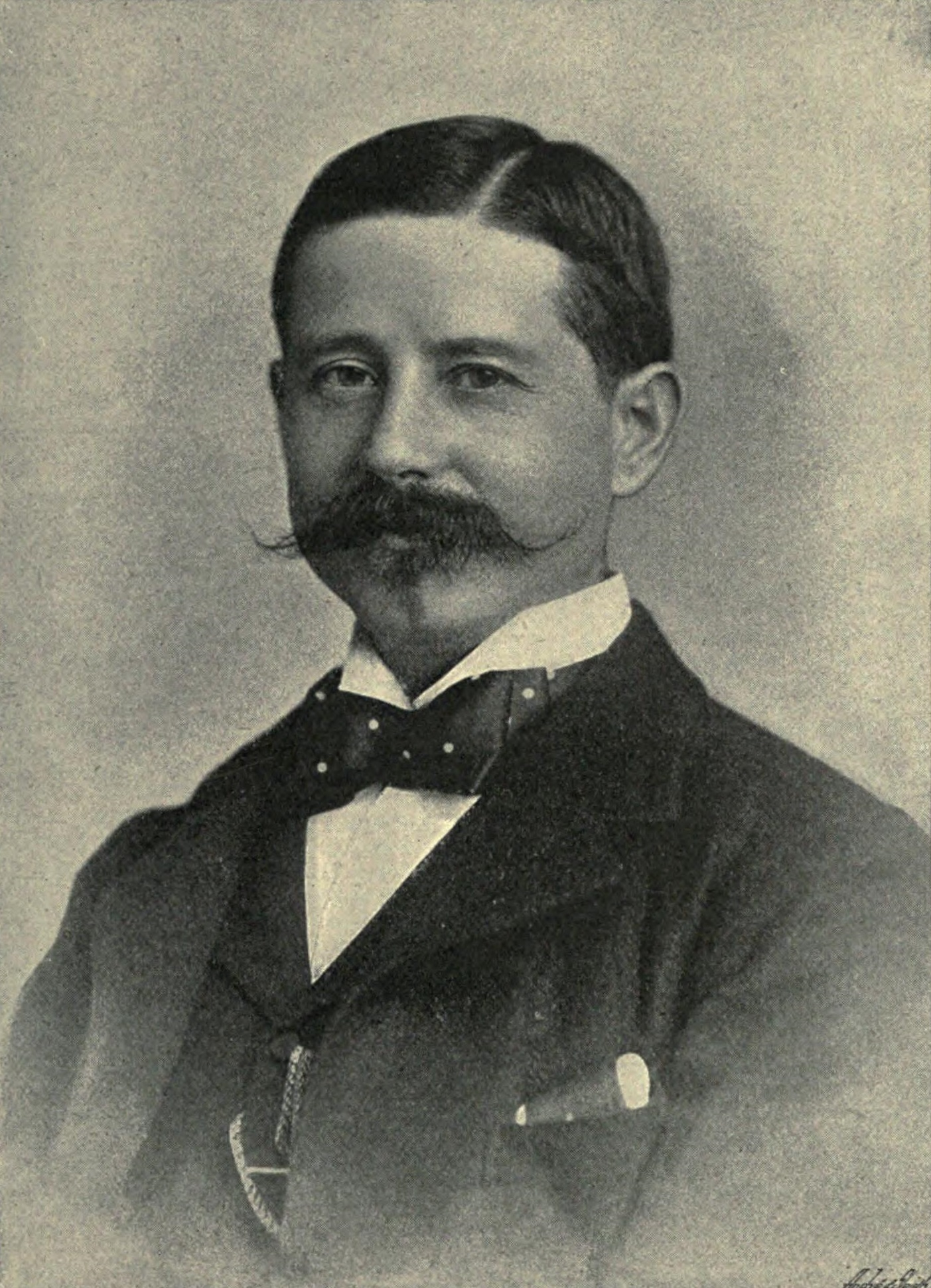
Sir Harry Johnston

The agreement stated that the Kabaka should exercise direct rule over the natives of Buganda administering justice through the Lukiiko and his officials. It also solidified the power of the largely Protestant Bakungu client-chiefs, led by Kagwa. The British sent only a few officials to administer the country, relying primarily on the Bakungu chiefs. For decades they were preferred because of their political skills, their Christianity, their friendly relations with the British, their ability to collect taxes, and the proximity of Entebbe to the Uganda capital. By the 1920s the British administrators were more confident, and had less need for military or administrative support.

By fixing the northern boundary of Uganda as the River Kafu, the agreement formalized Colvile's 1894 promise that Uganda would receive certain territories in exchange for their support against the Bunyoro. Two of the 'lost counties' (Buyaga and Bugangaizi) were returned to the Bunyoro following the Ugandan lost counties referendum of 1964.

== Treaty Key Points ==
Unlike the 1893 and 1894 treaties, the 1900 Uganda Agreement included clear boundaries of the Uganda kingdom, a land tenure system, and taxation policies.

Articles:

1. Outlines the boundaries of the Kingdom of Uganda,
2. The Kabaka and chiefs renounce any claims to tribute on the adjoining provinces of the Protectorate in favour of Her Majesty's Government;
3. The Uganda Kingdom in the administration of the Uganda Protectorate holds equal ranking with any other provinces of the Protectorate;
4. The revenue of the Kingdom will be merged with the general revenue of the Uganda Protectorate;
5. The laws made by Her Majesty's Government for the Uganda Protectorate will be equally applicable to the Uganda Kingdom, except when they are in conflict with the Agreement, in which case the Agreement will constitute a special exception;
6. So long as the Kabaka, chiefs, and natives conform to the laws instituted by Her Majesty's Government, the Kabaka of Uganda will be recognized as the native ruler of the province;
7. The Namasole Chua (mother of the present Kabaka), will be paid £50 a year that may not be continued to the mothers of other Kabakas;
8. All cases where natives and non-natives are concerned are subject to British courts only;
9. Establishes administrative counties;
10. The Kabaka of Uganda may appoint three native Officers of State;
11. Defines how the Lukiiko will be constituted;
12. Establishes a taxation system;
13. Nothing in the Agreement can be used to invalidate the preexisting right of the Kabaka to call upon every able-bodied male for military service, but the Kabaka may only exercise this power under the advice of Her Majesty's principal representative;
14. All main public roads will be maintained in good repair by the chief of the Saza (county) through which the road runs;
15. Establishes how the land of Uganda is to be distributed;
16. The natives of Uganda may not have rights to the forests, but the Baganda may obtain timber for building and firewood;
17. The rights to all minerals found on private estates belong to the owners of these estates. On the land outside these estates, the mineral rights belong to the Uganda Administration;
18. The Kabaka, Regents, Katikiro, and Regents will be given a sum of money in return for the cession of the right of control over 10,550 square miles of land;
19. Her Majesty's Government will pay the Mohammedan Uganda Chief, Mbogo, a pension of £250 a year, on the condition that he cedes all rights to Her Majesty's Government
20. If the Kingdom fails to pay the Administration during the first two years after signing the Agreement, Her Majesty's Government will no longer be bound by the Agreement. If the revenue collected exceeds £45,000 a year, the Kabaka and chiefs may appeal for an increase in the subsidy given to the Kabaka;
21. The phrase 'Uganda Administration' denotes the general government of the Uganda Protectorate. 'Her Majesty's representative' denotes the Commissioner, Higher Commissioner, Governor, or principal official;
22. The English text is the version which is binding on both parties.

== Consequences ==
In 1935, Sir Philip Mitchell came to Uganda as governor after serving in Tanganyika for the previous sixteen years. He was convinced that the relationship between Uganda and the protecting power should be of a character different from that between the native authorities and the Government of Tanganyika. Recognizing that early Protectorate officials had produced a pattern of increasing suspicion and surreptitious changes, Mitchell devised a plan for the reform and remodeling of the system between the Protectorate and Buganda Governments. Maintaining that the relationship between the Protectorate Government and the Native Government of Buganda was that of protected rather than indirect rule, he planned to substitute the post of Provincial Commissioner of Buganda with a Resident and to withdraw district officers from the center, assuming that the Kabaka would be obliged to follow advice given to him by the Resident and his staff. Under the 1900 Uganda Agreement, however, the Kabaka was only required to act upon such advice in the case of the implementation of Lukiiko resolutions. Relations between the Kabaka, the Protectorate Government, and his Ministers deteriorated, and because of the Governor's restricted power under the 1900 Agreement to impose his advice upon the Kabaka, the reorganization resulted in a steady decline in the influence that the Protectorate Government could exert in Buganda.

== See also ==
- Buganda Agreement (1955)
- Heligoland–Zanzibar Treaty (1890)
