= Florence Alice Lubega =

Ugandan politician (1917–2021)

Member of Parliament of Uganda
- In office 1962–1966

Member of the Legislative Council (LEGCO)
- In office 1957–1962

Deputy Minister for Community Development and Labour
- Incumbent
- Assumed office 1966

Personal details
- Born: November 5, 1917
- Died: October 28, 2021 Uganda
- Spouse: Saulo Lubega
- Children: None (outlived her children)
- Relatives: Samuel Wamala (father), Israel Magembe Wamala (brother), Paul Musoke Wamala (brother), Wamala Steven Ssempasa (brother), Wamala Herbert Dagirira (brother)
- Education: Gayaza High School; Buloba Teachers' College; Makerere College School; University of Oxford
- Occupation: Politician, Teacher
- Known for: First female Ugandan Member of Parliament

Florence Alice Lubega (5 November 1917 – 28 October 2021) was a Ugandan politician and the first female Ugandan to join Parliament in the independent Uganda in May 1962. She was one of the first female legislators of Uganda, being a member of the Legislative Council (LEGCO) in 1957. She was also a member of the first Ugandan Parliament, and Deputy Minister for Community Development and Labour in 1966.

== Background and education ==
Florence Lubega was the daughter of Buganda Premier Samuel Wamala and Erina Nantongo.

She was educated at Gayaza Girls' School before joining Buloba Teachers' College. Later she was the first female to be admitted to Makerere College School before joining Oxford University. Upon completion of her university studies in 1946, she returned to teach English at Makerere University.

== Personal life ==
Florence Lubega was married to Saulo Lubega, a teacher at Mityana secondary school and a former minister of finance Buganda government Florence Lubega outlived her children and she had four brothers; the late Israel Magembe Wamala [the musician]of Nakasajja in Kyaggwe, Wamala Steven Ssempasa, who lives in the United Kingdom, Paul Musoke Wamala, a former tourism operator who now lives in Luzira, a Kampala suburb and the late Wamala Herbert Dagirira.

She died on 28 October 2021, a week shy of her 104th birthday.
