= Birahimpur Sakit =

Village in Uttar Pradesh, India

- Village
- Location in Uttar Pradesh, India
- Coordinates: 27.42885°N 78.856°E
- Country: India
- State: Uttar Pradesh
- District: Etah
- Tehsil: Etah

Area
  - Total: 1.14 km^{2} (0.44 sq mi)

Population (2011)
  - Total: 1,177
  - Density: 1,030/km^{2} (2,670/sq mi)
- Time zone: UTC+5:30 (IST)

Birahimpur Sakit, also spelled Birampur Sakit, is a village in Sakit block of Etah district, Uttar Pradesh. It is located on the inside of a small oxbow lake and has an archaeological site associated with the Ochre Coloured Pottery culture. As of 2011, Birahimpur Sakit has a population of 1,177, in 181 households.

== Geography ==
Birahimpur Sakit is located about 9 km south of Malawan, on the inner side of a small oxbow lake. The soil in this area is hard and calcareous.

== Archaeology ==
About 1 km east of Birahimpur Sakit, near the northern tip of the small lake, is an archaeological mound where a few pottery shards associated with the Ochre Coloured Pottery culture were found. The ancient inhabitants of the site probably used the lake both for fishing and as a source of water. They likely also used the area west of the lake for agriculture.

== Demographics ==
As of 2011, Birahimpur Sakit had a population of 1,177, in 181 households. This population was 52.3% male (615) and 47.7% female (562). The 0-6 age group numbered 188 (98 male and 90 female), making up 16.0% of the total population. 18 residents were members of Scheduled Castes, or 1.5% of the total.

The 1981 census recorded Birahimpur Sakit (as "Bisampur Sakit") as having a population of 361 people (207 male and 154 female), in 63 households and 63 physical houses.

The 1961 census recorded Birahimpur Sakit (as "Birampur Sakit") as comprising 1 hamlet, with a total population of 233 people (124 male and 109 female), in 46 households and 35 physical houses. The area of the village was given as 280 acres.

The 1951 census recorded Birahimpur Sakit as comprising 1 hamlet, with a total population of 181 people (106 male and 75 female), in 34 households and 22 physical houses. The area of the village was given as 280 acres.

== Infrastructure ==
As of 2011, Birahimpur Sakit had 1 primary school; it did not have any healthcare facilities. Drinking water was provided by tap, hand pump, and tube well/borehole; there were no public toilets. The village had a public library but no post office; there was at least some access to electricity for residential and agricultural (but not commercial) purposes.
