= Vikrampur Village =

- Town
- Location in Madhya Pradesh, India Vikrampur Village (India)
- Coordinates: 22.760710431159534°N 76.8562348367531°E
- Country: India
- State: Madhya Pradesh
- District: Dewas

Languages
  - Official: Hindi
- Time zone: UTC+5:30 (IST)
- PIN: 455332
- Telephone code: 07273
- ISO 3166 code: IN-MP
- Vehicle registration: MP-41

Vikrampur Village is a town and a Panchayat in Dewas district in the Indian state of Madhya Pradesh. Vikrampur Village is a major agricultural production area in Madhya Pradesh. Earlier.As of 2001 India census,
