= Stanley Alexander de Smith =

English academic, lawyer and author

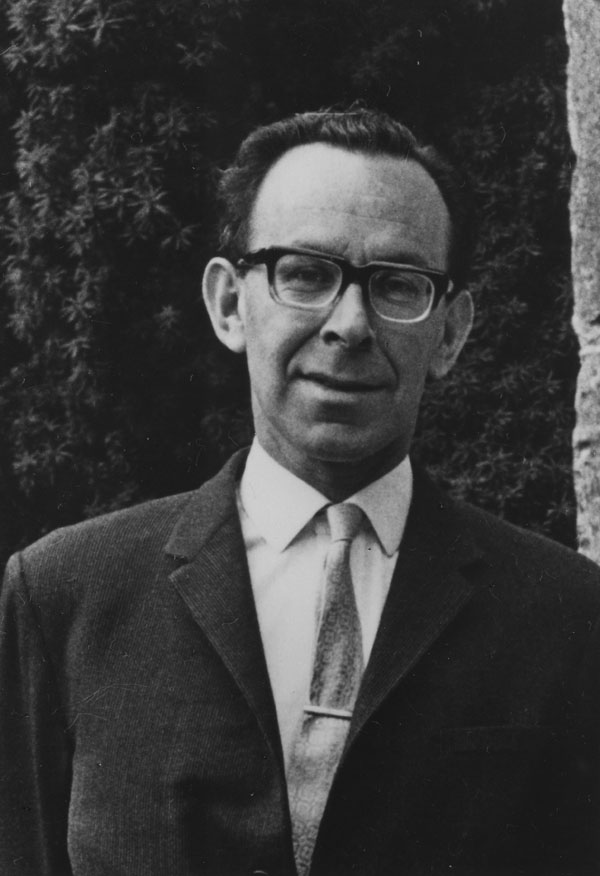
- de Smith in the 1960s at the London School of Economics
- Born: 27 March 1922; London, England
- Died: 12 February 1974 (aged 51)
- Education: St Catharine's College, Cambridge; University of London
- Occupation: Academic lawyer
- Employers: London School of Economics; Fitzwilliam College, Cambridge
- Awards: Order of Leopold II, Croix de Guerre, FBA

Stanley Alexander de Smith FBA (27 March 1922 – 12 February 1974) was an English academic lawyer and author.

== Biography ==
De Smith was born in London and educated at Southend High School and St Catharine's College, Cambridge (BA 1942, MA 1946); in 1958, he submitted a thesis titled Judicial review of administrative action: a study in case law and received his doctorate from the University of London in 1959. After distinguished war service with the Royal Artillery—during which he was mentioned in despatches and awarded the Order of Leopold II and the Croix de Guerre (1940) with palms—he taught from 1946 at the London School of Economics, University of London, successively as Assistant Lecturer, Lecturer, Reader and (from 1959 to 1970) as Professor of Public Law. He taught LLM courses on "Constitutional Laws of the Commonwealth I" (focusing on Canada, Australia and either India or Pakistan) and, from 1957, "a second course on constitutional laws of the Commonwealth, with a syllabus excluding those countries already covered by the established course and devoting special attention to the constitutions of Ghana, the Federation of Malaya, the Federation and Regions of Nigeria, the Federation of the West Indies, the Federation of Rhodesia and Nyasaland, Singapore, Uganda and Kenya". In 1954 he accompanied Sir Keith Hancock, acting as secretary to the Namirembe Conference in Uganda.

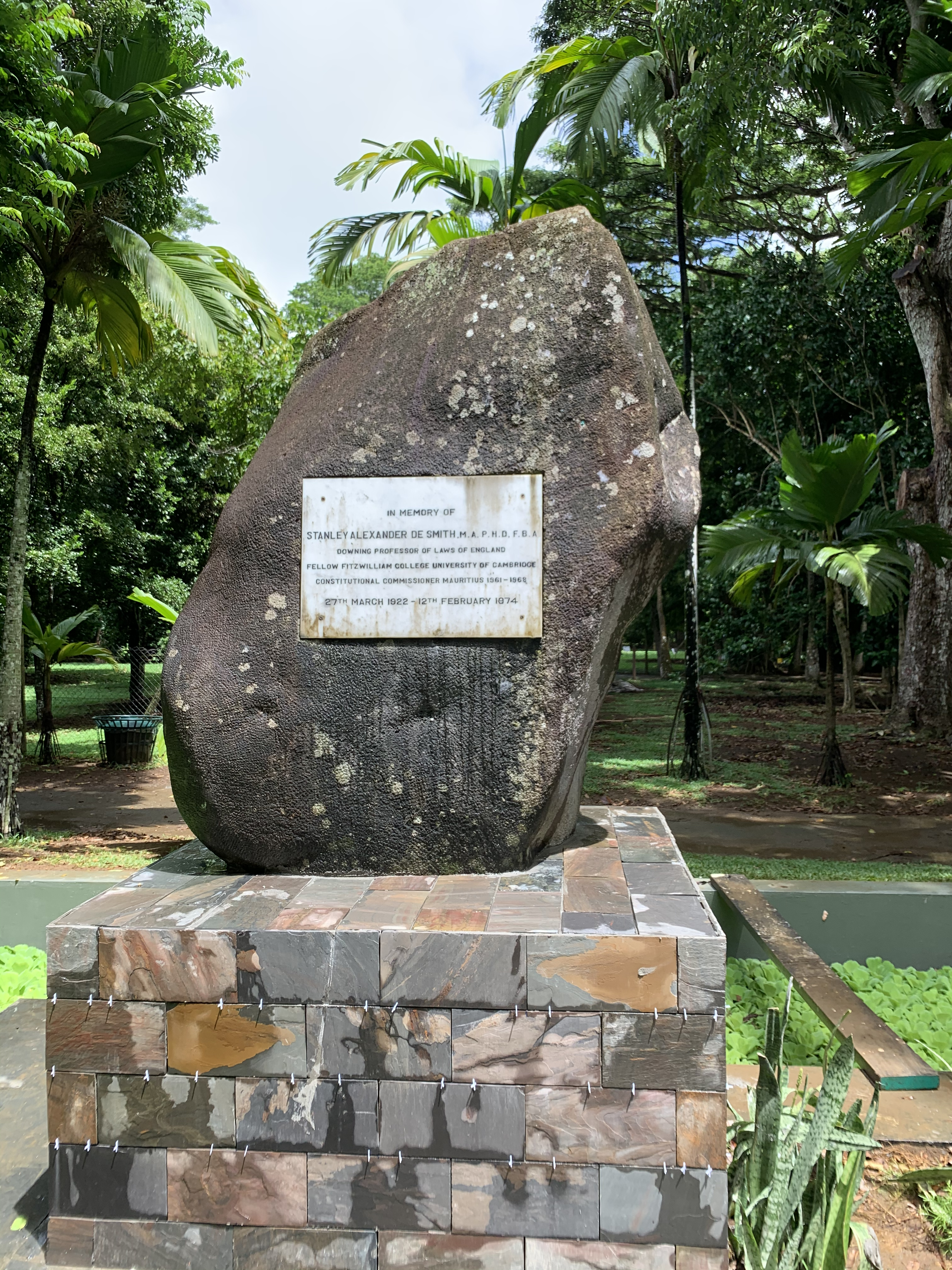
Memorial Stanley Alexander de Smith (Sir Seewoosagur Ramgoolam Botanical Garden)

In 1970, de Smith returned to the University of Cambridge as Downing Professor of the Laws of England and a Fellow of Fitzwilliam College. In 1971 he was elected to a Fellowship of the British Academy. He was editor of the Cambridge Law Journal from 1973 to 1974. He died in February 1974, aged 51. During the 1960s he served on a part-time basis as Constitutional Commissioner for Mauritius. He drafted its constitution at the time the country attained independence on 12 March 1968. His work for Mauritius is commemorated by a memorial in the Pamplemousses Botanical Gardens; his ashes were scattered in that country.

== Publications ==
De Smith's research and writing in the field of constitutional law focused in particular on the constitutional problems of developing countries: his advice in this area was frequently sought by the United Kingdom and other governments, and his work led to the publication of The New Commonwealth and its Constitutions in 1964, and after a stay as visiting fellow at the Center for International Studies and as visiting professor at the Law School of New York University, of Microstates and Micronesia in 1970. To the end of his career he continued to be active as a consultant upon the constitutional problems of emergent states and nations.

A second area of interest was administrative law. From the publication in 1959 of the first edition of Judicial Review of Administrative Action, his reputation rapidly became established. He produced two further editions of this work in 1968 and 1973. A fourth edition was prepared in 1980 by Professor John M. Evans. Two subsequent editions of de Smith's ground-breaking work have been written by an editorial team led by Lord Woolf, Professor Jeffrey Jowell QC and Professor Andrew Le Sueur.

Among his other works was a popular student text, Constitutional and Administrative Law, with subsequent editions prepared by Barbara de Smith (de Smith's widow), Professor Harry Street and Professor Rodney Brazier. de Smith was joint-editor of "Commonwealth and Dependencies" in the third edition of Halsbury's Laws of England and editor of "Administrative Law" in the fourth edition of that work.

An obituary in the Cambridge Law Journal paid tribute to "a legacy of outstanding scholarship. He reshaped administrative law as an academic subject in the United Kingdom, and his wide-ranging contributions to the literature of public law were consistently incisive and constructive. His style was both elegant and distinctive: like Blackstone – as Jeremy Bentham put it – he spoke the language of the scholar and the gentleman". The Cambridge Law Journal noted that de Smith "was at his happiest in postgraduate teaching and the supervision of research students, but he cared deeply about all aspects of teaching and tripos reform ... Those that knew him will remember him as a somewhat reserved person with a quiet sense of humour, though they will not have known that the appearance of reserve was the result of deafness caused by his artillery service in the war; he was invariably encouraging to his students and younger colleagues and he was generous in his assessment of others". A notice in the Modern Law Review, a journal for which he served as secretary for many years, gave the following assessment:

His work in administrative law has been of seminal significance in the development of the principles of judicial review by courts throughout the Commonwealth. With characteristic modesty, he was astonished by the success of his major books. ... Stanley de Smith was a scholar and legal writer of exceptional quality. He was shy and gave a—perhaps deceptive—impression of diffidence, but his conversation was enlivened by a dry humour, sometimes rather reminiscent of his hero, Maitland, with whom as a constitutional lawyer he will certainly stand comparison

== Select bibliography ==
- The Vocabulary for Commonwealth Relations (London: Published for the Institute of Commonwealth Studies by the Athlone Press, 1954).
- Judicial Review of Administrative Action (London: Stevens) – 1st edn 1959; 2nd edn 1968, 3rd edn 1973. ISBN 0420454004.
- The Lawyers and the Constitution: an Inaugural Lecture (London: London School of Economics and Political Science, 1960).
- The New Commonwealth and its Constitutions (London: Stevens, 1964). ISBN 0420386807.
- Report of the Constitutional Commissioner [for the Mauritius Legislative Assembly] (Port Louis: Govt Printer, 1965).
- Microstates and Micronesia: Problems of America's Pacific islands and other Minute Territories (New York: New York University Press, 1970). ISBN 0814701183.
