= Lukiiko =

Parliament of the Kingdom of Buganda

Great Lukiiko of Buganda
- 34th Lukiiko
- Coat of arms of Buganda

Type
- Type: Unicameral

Leadership
- Speaker: Patrick Luwaga Mugumbule
- Deputy Speaker: Ahmed Lwasa

Structure
- Seats: 180
- Political groups: His Majesty's Government (33): Katikkiro and Ministers (23); Kabaka's representatives (10); Territorial representatives (101): Elected members (83); County Chiefs (18); Social representatives (42): Civil society (24); Youth (18); Clergy (3): Church of Uganda (1); Catholic Church (1); Islam (1); Presiding Officer: Speaker (1)

Elections
- Voting system: Election and Appointment by the Kabaka

Meeting place
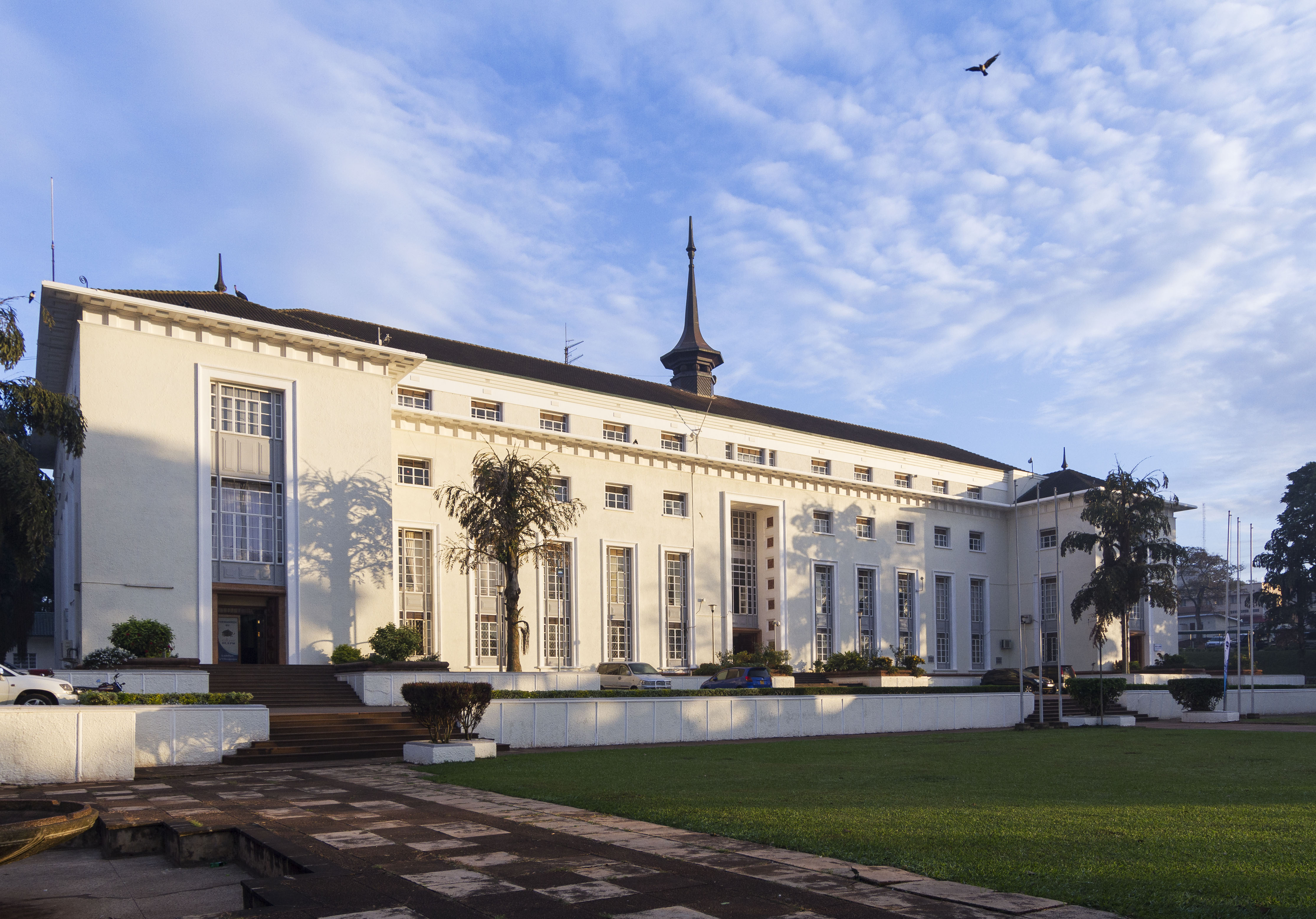
- Lukiiko Hall, Bulange House; Mengo, Uganda

Website
- buganda.or.ug/the-great-lukiiko

The Lukiiko (formally the Great Lukiiko) is the Parliament of the Kingdom of Buganda. It was, according to tradition, established by Kato Kintu, the first Kabaka of Buganda, after defeating the rival prince Bbemba, when he called a general meeting of influential people at Magongo. It took its present form as a result of the Buganda Agreement of 1900, which formed the basis of British relations with the Kingdom of Buganda, and subsequent agreements.

The Lukiiko is today convened at the Bulange. The membership consists of directly-elected members from Buganda counties, Buganda county chiefs, members appointed by the Kabaka, and Buganda cabinet ministers. The current speaker is Patrick Luwaga Mugumbule, and the deputy speaker is Ahmed Lwasa. The Lukiiko is charged with legislating by-laws of the kingdom, but is not allowed by the state government to legislate on political matters.
