= Pinedo =

Pinedo may refer to:

== People ==
- Ainhoa Pinedo (born 1983), Spanish race walker
- Alejandro de Pinedo (born 1965), Spanish composer, author, and music producer
- Angélica Larrea Pinedo (born 1944), Afro Bolivian queen
- Aurora Pinedo (1910–1992), Afro Bolivian princess regent
- Bonifacio Pinedo (died 1954), Afro Bolivian king
- Cora Cecilia Pinedo (born 1967), Mexican politician
- Elisabeth Pinedo (born 1981), Spanish handball player
- Federico Pinedo (born1955), Argentine politician
- Francesco de Pinedo (1890–1933), Italian aviator
- Gustavo Pinedo (born 1988), Bolivian footballer
- Iñaki Ruiz de Pinedo (born 1954), Spanish politician
- Jazmín Pinedo (born 1990), Peruvian television host
- Jorge Ortiz de Pinedo (born 1948), Mexican comedian and actor
- José María Pinedo (1795–1885), Argentine commander in the navy of the United Provinces of the River Plate
- Julio Pinedo (born 1953), ceremonial king of the Afro Bolivian community of the Nor Yungas province
- Mario Pinedo (born 1964), Bolivian footballer
- Nelson Pinedo (1928–2016), Colombian singer
- Óscar Ortiz de Pinedo (1910–1978), Cuban actor
- Patricia Pinedo (born 1981), Spanish handball player
- Rolando Pinedo Larrea (born 1994), Afro-Bolivian crown prince
- Uchicho Pinedo, first Afro-Bolivian king

== Places ==
- Pinedo (Valencia), a village in Spain
- General Pinedo, Chaco, a town in Argentina
- Tnte. Gral. Gerardo Pérez Pinedo Airport, Atalaya, Ucayali Region, Peru

== See also ==
- General Pinedo (disambiguation)
