= Black elite =

Socially prominent black and mixed-race people

The term Black elite refers to elites within Black communities that are either political, economic, intellectual or cultural in nature. These are typically distinct from other national elites in the Western world, such as the United Kingdom's aristocracy and the United States' upper class.

== United Kingdom ==
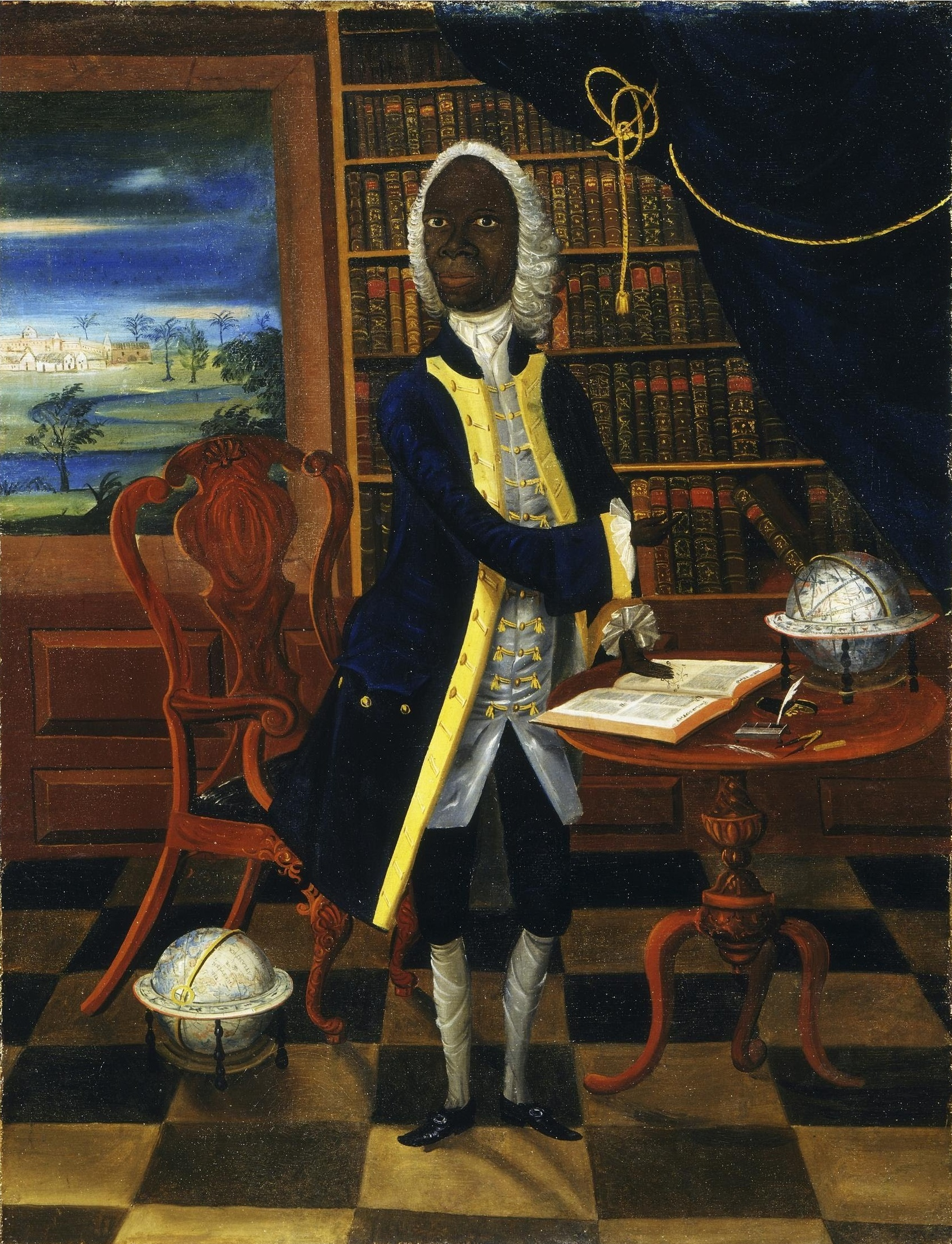
Francis Williams, an Afro-Caribbean British scholar and poet. A member of a property-owning Afro-Jamaican family, he took British citizenship in 1723.

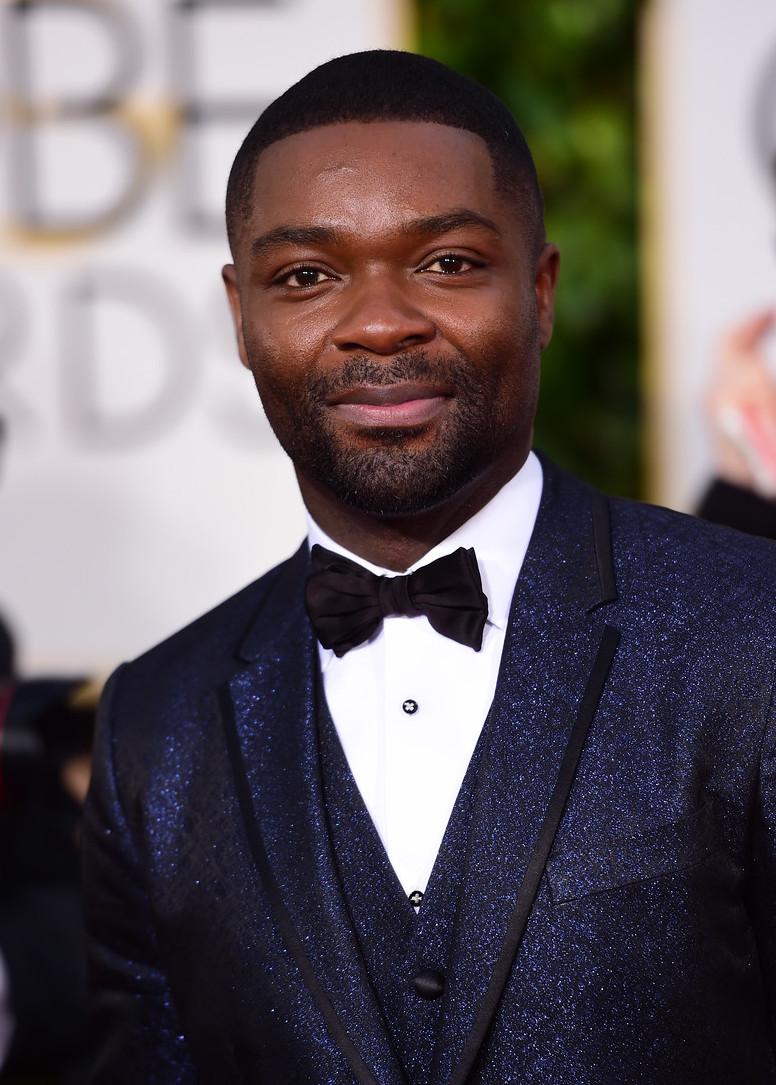
The Nigerian British actor David Oyelowo has had a successful career in both Britain and the United States, where he has also taken U.S. citizenship. He was born into a royal family of the Nigerian chieftaincy system.

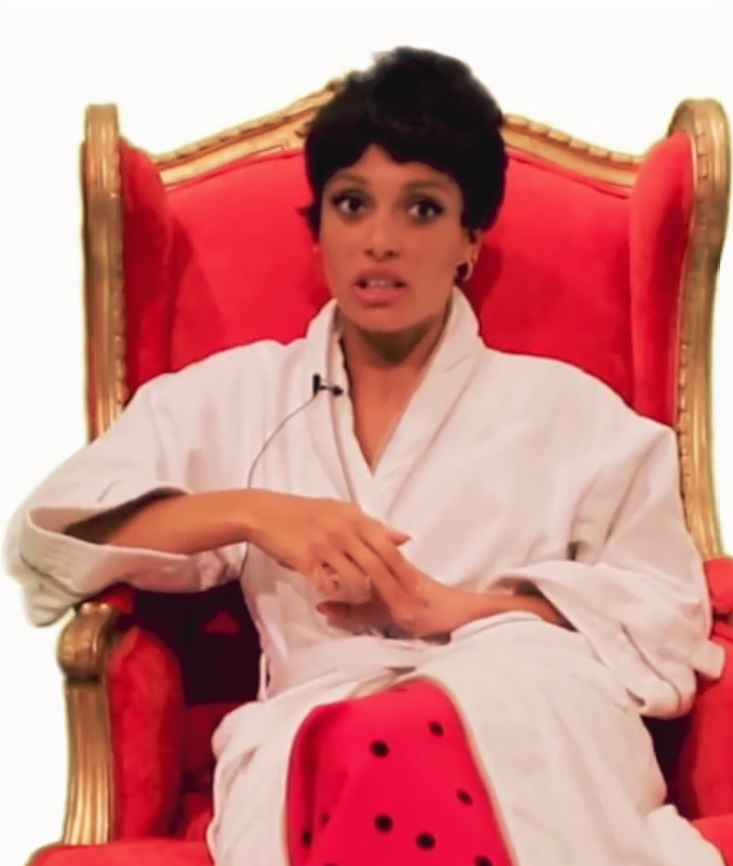
The model Adwoa Aboah is a Ghanaian British descendant of the Lowthers of Lowther Castle, Earls of Lonsdale. Her earliest Lowther ancestor served as Lord Warden of the March of Western England in the 16th century.

In the United Kingdom, the Black community has largely consisted of immigrants and their descendants whose residency in the country dates from either the time of the old British Empire or that of the new Commonwealth. Persons classified as being of African descent have nevertheless been a recognizable component of British society since at least the Elizabethan period. Some individuals of African or partial African descent were introduced to elite levels of society in the 18th and 19th centuries, such as Nathaniel Wells, a mixed-race British landowner and country gentleman, Dido Elizabeth Belle, the mixed-race child of a British colonial aristocrat, Martha Grey, Countess of Stamford, the South African wife of the 8th Earl of Stamford, and Sarah Forbes Bonetta, the West African adopted goddaughter of Queen Victoria. Others attained political and social prominence, such as Olaudah Equiano, a freed African slave who became a campaigner for the abolition of slavery in the Empire, and Mary Seacole, a heroine of the Crimean War. In the first half of the 20th century the Trinidadian Learie Constantine became a professional cricketer in the Lancashire League and contributed to the campaign for racial equality in Britain.

In the latter 20th and early 21st centuries, elites have developed within the Black British community, with the rise of Black and mixed-race national leaders such as Paul Boateng, and the success of numerous Black and mixed-race persons in specialized industries, such as the arts (for example, Lenny Henry).

Today, Britain's Black and mixed-race people are included in the annual Powerlist—a ranking of the nation's most prominent people of color. A number of them, such as Boateng and Henry, have been made peers and/or knights of the realm. There is also a small community of British aristocrats that are of partially Black descent. Emma Thynn (née McQuiston), the Marchioness of Bath as the wife of the 8th Marquess, and Lady Naomi Gordon-Lennox, the adopted daughter of the 10th Duke of Richmond, belong to this sub-group. Other notable members are Prince Archie of Sussex and Princess Lilibet of Sussex, the mixed-race children of Prince Harry and Meghan, the Duke and Duchess of Sussex.

== United States ==
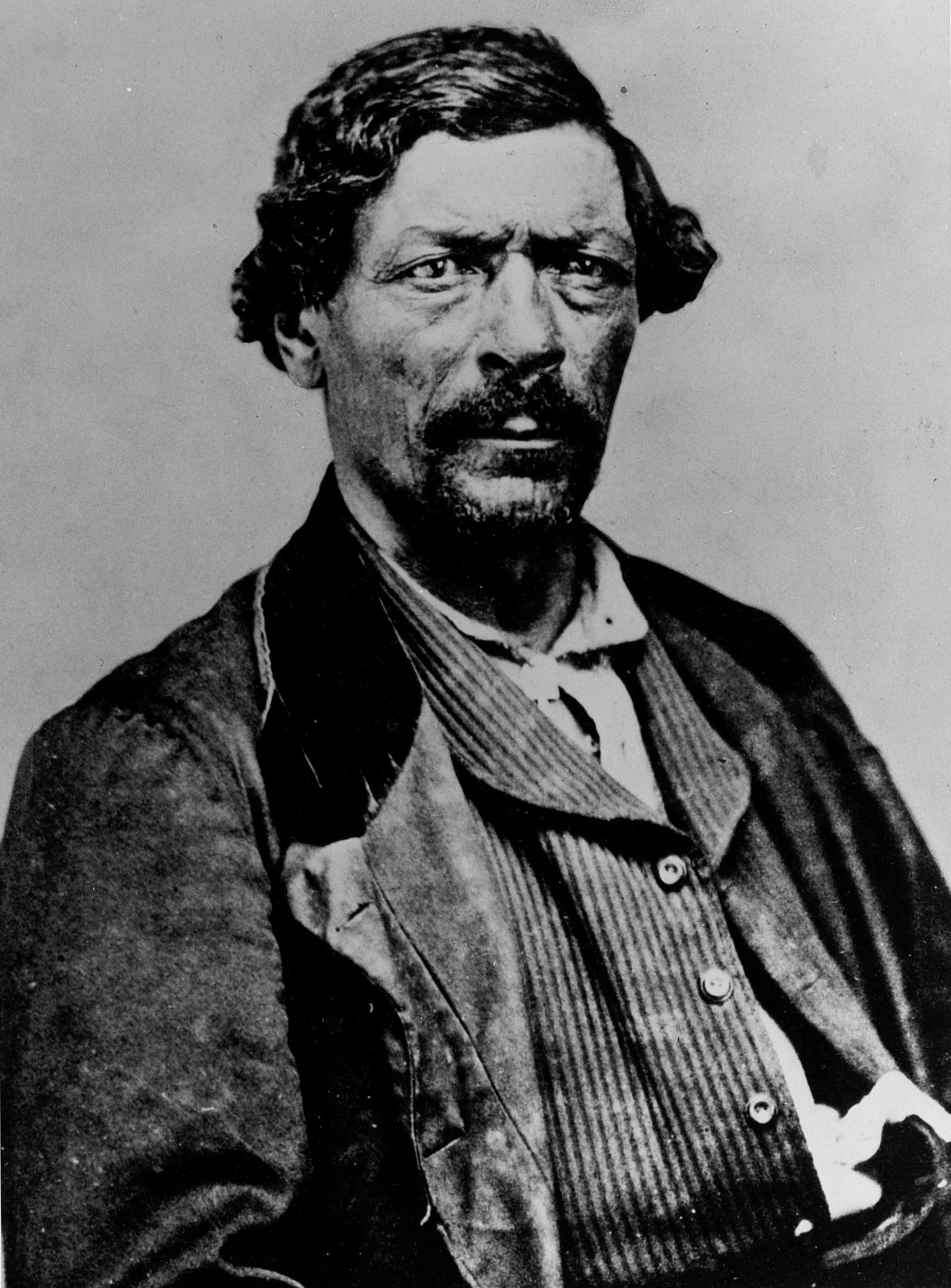
A chief of the Crow Nation, James Beckwourth was the son of an American planter and his enslaved African-American mistress. He is regarded as the most important Black mountain man in the history of the Old West.

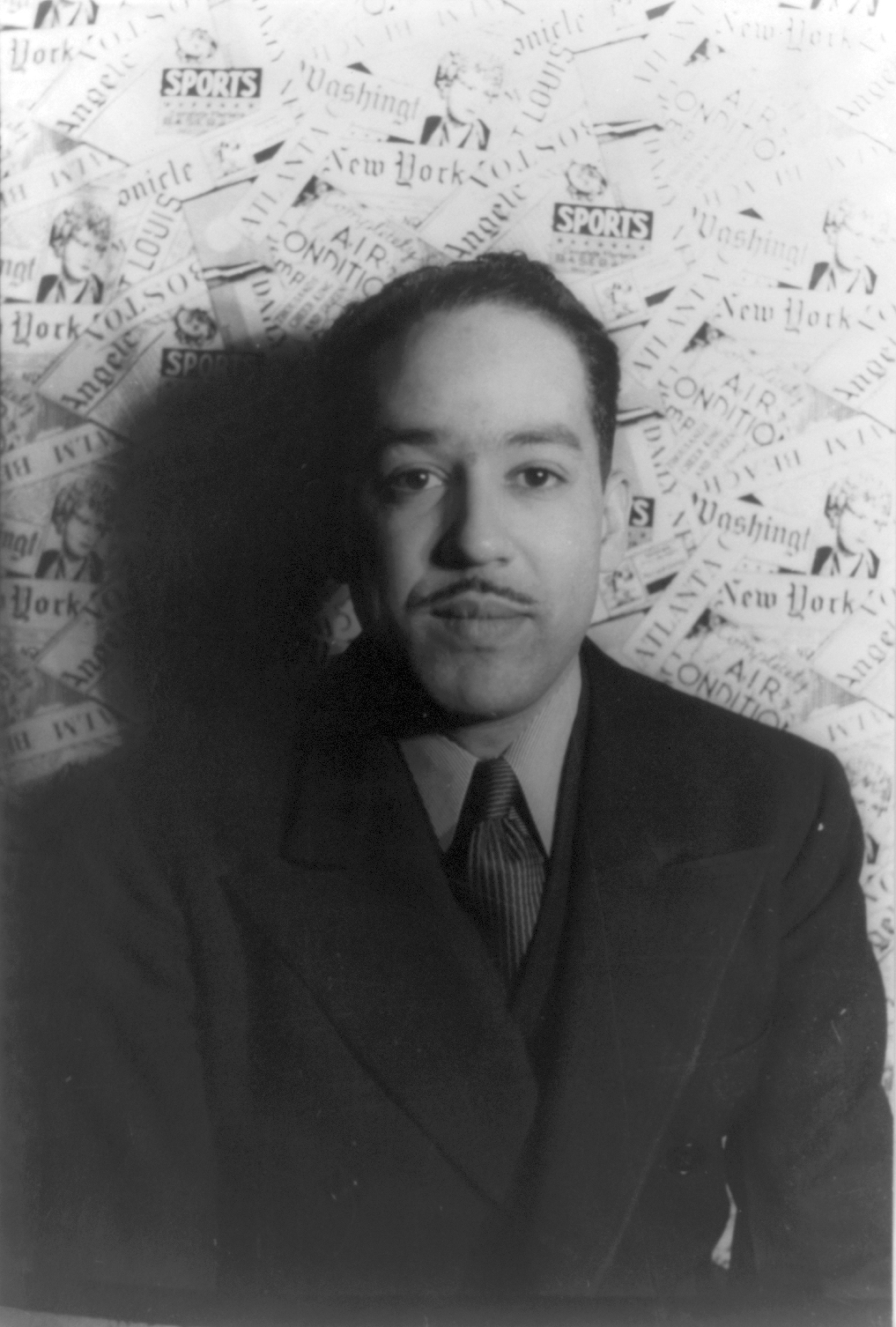
Writer and social activist Langston Hughes was one of the leading lights of the Harlem Renaissance. His family, the Langstons, were prominent free blacks.

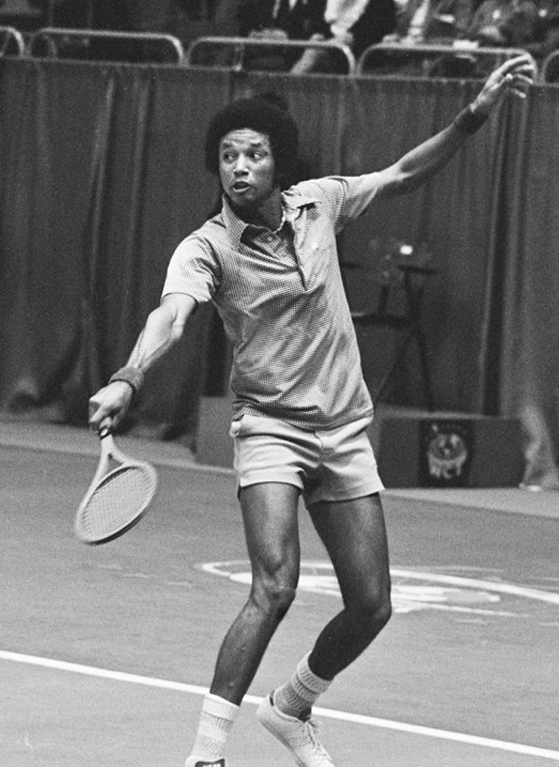
Tennis champion Arthur Ashe, also an AIDS activist, became a member of the African-American upper class. His direct line of descent in the United States could be traced to 1735.

In the North of the United States, many educated Black people (taking advantage of their relative freedom) took part in abolitionist and suffragist activities. They also provided support to stations of the Underground Railroad prior to the abolition of slavery. Later, during the Reconstruction Era, a number of them took part in various professions and grew quite wealthy in places including Brooklyn.

In the South, an elite started forming before the American Civil War among free Black people who managed to acquire property. Of the free people of color in North Carolina in the censuses from 1790 to 1810, 80 percent can be traced to African Americans free in Virginia during the colonial period. Most were descended from unions between free white women and enslaved or free Africans or African Americans. Free Black people migrated into frontier Virginia and then to other states over several generations in the colonial period, as did many of their neighbors. Extensive research into colonial court records, wills and deeds has demonstrated that most of those free families came from relationships or marriages between white women, servant or free, and Black men, servant, free or slave. Such relationships were part of the more fluid relationships among the working class before the boundaries of slavery hardened.

During slavery times, white slaveholders and others were known to rape enslaved African women, fathering mixed-race children. There were also slaveholders who had caring relationships, common-law marriages, and legal marriages to enslaved Black women. They sometimes freed such women and their children. Some slaveholders did provide for their mixed-race children by ensuring they were educated; in the earliest periods, they might be apprenticed to a trade or craft. In some cases, fathers arranged to settle property on their "natural" children. Whatever property the father passed on to the child was important in helping that person get a start in life. These mulattos in turn patterned their subsequent lives after "polite" white society. In some places, such as New Orleans, this coalesced into what was known as Plaçage.

In the South, the free Black elite often took leadership roles within the church, Black schools, and community. Natural leaders rose up from many different classes. Some developed catering businesses or other services that enabled them to take advantage of their white contacts through family and other connections. The Black elite also enjoyed the benefits of living within the white neighborhoods, which further isolated them from the darker-skinned African Americans and which caused many of them to blame them for the downward shifts in life-style choices. Some lighter skinned Black people even passed for white, and were assimilated into white society thereafter.

The Civil Rights Movement and affirmative action brought about many changes for the Black elite. As the old elite died away, a new Black elite emerged. Within its ranks are politicians, entrepreneurs, actors, singers, sports figures, and many more who are otherwise part of America's wider upper-middle class. The political leaders Barack Obama and Kamala Harris are prominent members of this new elite.

== Other examples ==
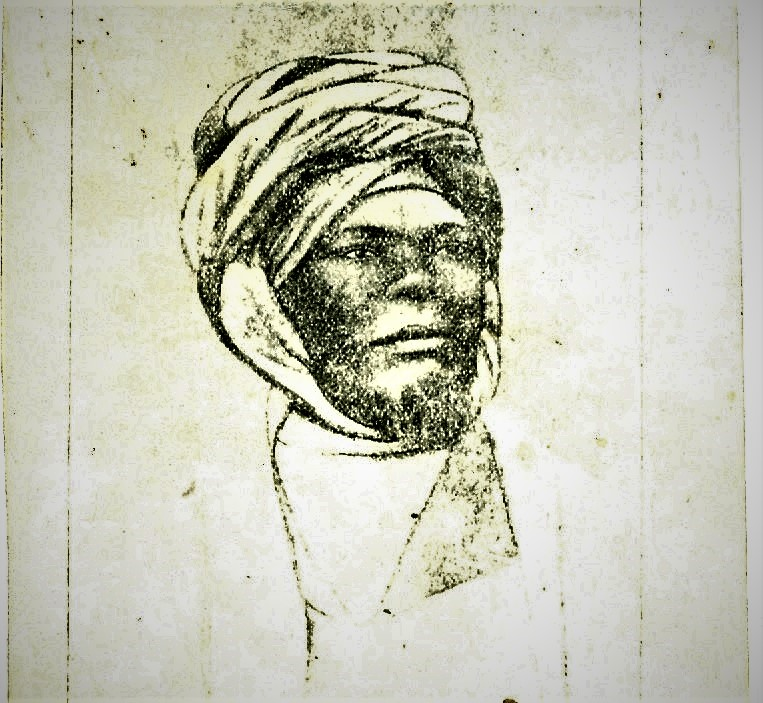
The trader and community leader Mohammed Shitta Bey. A chief in the Nigerian chieftaincy system, he was created a bey in the nobility of Ottoman Turkey in the year before his death.

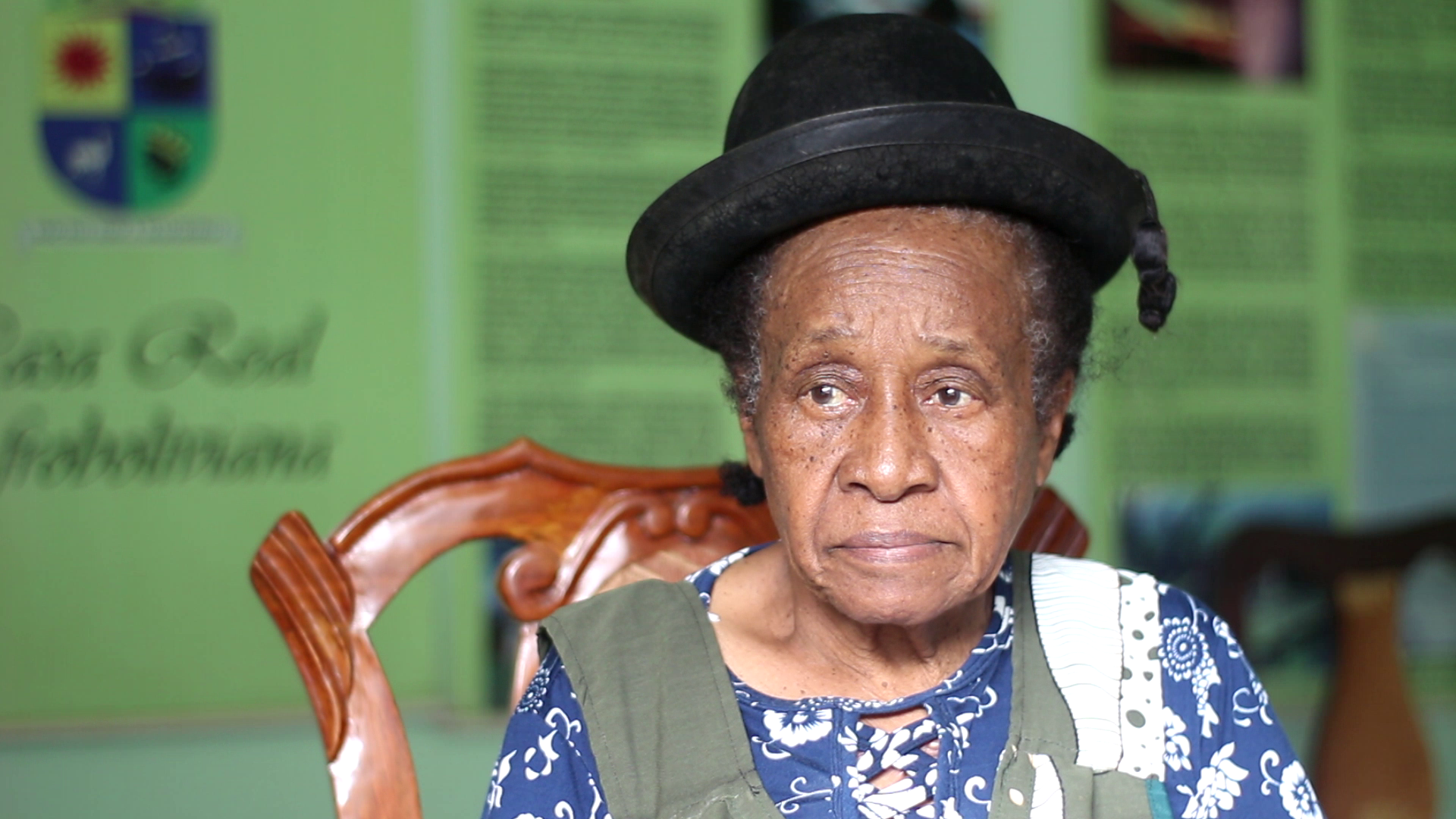
Angélica Larrea, consort to Julio Pinedo, King of the Afro-Bolivians. The Afro-Bolivian monarch claims direct descent from medieval royals of the West and Central African regions.

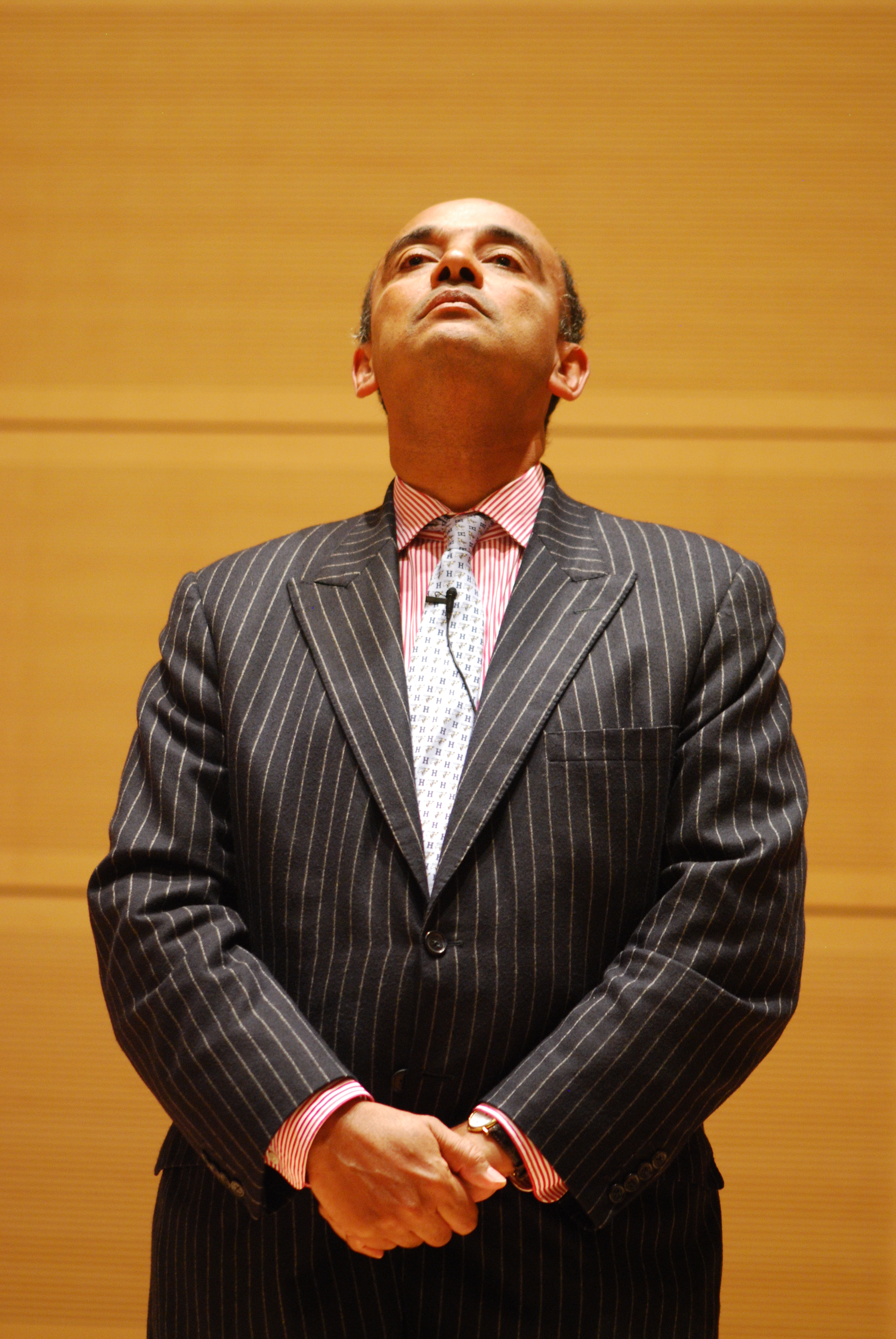
The philosopher Kwame Anthony Appiah – a chief in the Ghanaian chieftaincy system – is also connected to the upper classes of the Western world: His direct line of descent can be traced back to the Norman monarchs of medieval England.

In addition to those already cited, groups from around the world that either are or once were generally thought to constitute a Black elite include:

- Abirus
- Affranchis
- Afro-Bolivian monarchy
- Aguda people
- Americo-Liberians
- Andriana
- Angolan Mestiços
- Aro Igbos
- Assimilados
- Binis of Benin City
- Black Loyalists
- Black Patriots
- Children of the Plantation
- Coloureds
- Creoles of Color
- Dahomeyan Fons
- Egba Alake Yorubas
- Emancipados
- Ethiopian nobility
- Évolués
- Fernandino peoples
- Ganwas
- Gbara clans of Mali
- Ghanaian chieftaincy
- Gold Coast Euro-Africans
- Ibani Ijaws
- Kilukeni Kongolese
- Kumasi Ashantis
- Links
- Masonic Order of Liberia
- Mourides
- Mulatto Haitians
- National Pan-Hellenic Council
- Nigerian bourgeoisie
- Nigerian chieftaincy
- Oyo Yorubas
- Pardo Brazilians
- Prazeiros
- Prince Hall Freemasons
- Reformed Ogboni Fraternity
- Saro people
- Shirazis of the Swahili Coast
- Siddis of Janjira and Jafarabad
- Sierra Leone Creole people
- Sigma Pi Phi
- Signares
- South African Inkosis

== See also ==
- Aristocracy (class)
- Aristocracy (system)
- Elitism
- Nouveau Riche
- Old Money
- Upper class

== Sources ==
- Benjamin, Lois, The Black Elite, Chicago: Nelson-Hall Publishers, 1991.
- Landry, Bart, The New Black Middle Class, University of California Press, 1987, ISBN 9780520064652.
