= Francisco Manuel de las Heras y Borrero =

Spanish historian and civil servant

His Excellency Francisco Manuel de las Heras y Borrero

Grand Chancellor of the Americas of the Royal Order of Merit of Prince Uchicho
- In office 2012–2013
- Monarch: Julio I

Personal details
- Born: April 12, 1951 Huelva, Andalusia, Spain
- Died: December 30, 2013 (aged 62) Seville, Andalusia, Spain
- Spouse: María Dolores Ojeda Gómez
- Children: 2
- Education: University of Seville; Polytechnic University of Madrid; University of Extremadura
- Occupation: historian

Don Francisco Manuel de las Heras y Borrero, Duke of the Royal City of Mururata, Baron de Heras (12 April 1951 – 30 December 2013) was a Spanish historian, aristocrat, and civil servant.

== Early life and education ==
Heras y Borrero was born on 12 April 1951 in Huelva to Manuel de las Heras y García de la Mata and María de los Dolores Borrero Gómez. His family, originally from Soria, were part of the Spanish minor nobility.

He obtained a degree in law in 1973 from the University of Seville, a degree in economics from the Polytechnic University of Madrid in 1974, and a juris doctor from the University of Extremadura in 1998. He earned a diploma in genealogy, heraldry, and nobility at the Salazar y Castro Institute.

== Career ==
In 1987, he began working for the European Union, holding various offices in the Directorate General for Employment and Social Affairs of the European Commission in Brussels. In 2002, he was appointed to the Foreign Service of the European Commission as its first counselor and head of the finance and contracts section of the Embassy Delegation of the European Commission in the Dominican Republic and in Venezuela. He also served as a vice representative of the European Union in Kampala, Uganda.

In 2003, he joined the Dominican Institute of Genealogy.

== Personal life ==
Heras y Borrero married María Dolores Ojeda Gómez on 24 September 1977. They had two daughters, Mariola and Marisol.

Heras y Borrero was made a Knight of the Grand Collar, and appointed as Grand Chancellor of the Americas, of the Royal Order of Merit of Prince Uchicho by King Julio I of the Afro-Bolivians. He was ennobled by Julio I, becoming the Duke of the Royal City of Mururata.

On 18 March 2008, Heras y Borrero was made a baron by Prince David Bagration of Mukhrani, head of the Royal House of Georgia.

He died on 30 December 2013 from malaria.

== Honours ==
- Knight of the Sacred Military Constantinian Order of Saint George
- Knight of the Sacred Angelic Imperial Constantinian Order of Saint George (Bourbon-Parma)
- Knight Divirsero of the Ancient and Illustrious Solar de Tejada
- Commander of the Order of Merit of Duarte, Sánchez and Mella
- Commander of the Royal Order of Merit of San Ludovico (Bourbon-Parma)
- Gentleman Knight of the Family and Trunk House of the Twelve Lineages of the Very Noble and Loyal City of Soria
- Knight Grand Imperial Plate Hispanic Order of Charles V
- Grand Chancellor of the Americas and Knight of the Grand Collar of the Royal Order of Merit of Prince Uchicho
- Brother of the Pontifical, Royal, and Illustrious Order of Our Lady of Romería de El Rocío of Almonte
