= Princess Aurora =

Princess Aurora may refer to:

- Princess Aurora Pinedo (1910–1992), princess regent of the Afro-Bolivian monarchy
- Princess Aurora, a character in The Sleeping Beauty by Tchaikovsky
- Aurora (Sleeping Beauty), a character from Disney's Sleeping Beauty (1959 film)
- In Charles Perrault's version of Sleeping Beauty, Sleeping Beauty's daughter is named L'Aurore or Aurora
- Princess Aurora, a very minor fictional Egyptian princess who is mentioned in Jackie Chan Adventures
- Princess Aurora, a main character in the 1980s Japanese animated TV series Starzinger
- Princess Aurora (film), a 2005 South Korean crime film where the stickers of Princess Aurora from Starzinger is involved
- Princess Aurora (TV series), a 2013 South Korean drama series
