= Larrea (disambiguation) =

Larrea may refer to:

- Larrea Cav. 1800, a genus of caltrops
- Larrea Ortega 1797, nom. rejec., a synonym of Hoffmannseggia Cav. 1798
- Larrea, Alava, a village in Álava, Spain

== People with the surname Larrea ==
- Angélica Larrea (born 1944), Afro-Bolivian ceremonial queen
- Rolando Pinedo Larrea (born 1994), Afro-Bolivian crown prince
