= Boniface I (disambiguation) =

Boniface I might refer to:

- Pope Boniface I (died 422)
- Boniface I, Margrave of Tuscany (died 823)
- Boniface I, Marquess of Montferrat (died 1052)
- Bonifacio I (1888–1954), King of the Afro-Bolivian monarchy
