= John Baptist Walusimbi =

Katikkiro of Buganda

Katikkiro of Buganda
- In office 1 January 2008 – 2013
- Monarch: Muwenda Mutebi II
- Preceded by: Emmanuel Ndawula
- Succeeded by: Charles Mayiga

Personal details
- Occupation: politician, engineer

John Baptist Walusimbi is a Ugandan politician and engineer who served as the Katikkiro of the Kingdom of Buganda from 2008 to 2013.

== Katikkiro of Buganda ==
Walusimbi was appointed as Katikkiro of Buganda on 1 January 2008 and served in this capacity until 2013. He was considered relatively moderate and apolitical compared to the Katikkiro Muliika. In 2008, he called for peace between the Mengo and central governments.

Walusimbi agreed to Ugandan President Yoweri Museveni's request for him to meet with the Ssabanyala of Banyala and the Ssabaluuli of Buruuli, which led to some Bugandan officials and loyalists to accuse Walusimbi of advancing Museveni's political interests.

During his tenure as Katikkiro, the Kingdom of Buganda, the 2009 riots took place, leaving many dead and injured. The riots caused destruction in Kampala and led to the government closing CBS FM, the kingdom's official radio station.

He founded the Omumuli initiative to improve household incomes through agricultural work. He also designed projects to improve Buganda's revenue base, including the Muganzirwazza commercial plaza at Katwe.

Walusimbi was made a Knight of the Grand Collar of the Royal Order of Merit of Prince Uchicho by King Julio I of the Afro-Bolivians.

His four-year term was extended another year.

== Controversies ==
In 2021, he was removed from the Register of Engineers by the Ugandan Engineers Registration Board, preventing him to continue working as an engineer.

In September 2024, news reports stated that Walusimbi was facing jailtime for failing to pay back debts owed to Micheal Hadoke, a city money lender. The baliffs demanded a total debt collection of sh 305,350,000.

== Honours ==
- Knight of the Grand Collar of the Royal Order of Merit of Prince Uchicho

== Succession table ==
Preceded by Emmanuel Ndawula	Katikkiro of Buganda; 2008–2013	Succeeded by Charles Peter Mayiga
