= Miguel Dongil y Sánchez =

Spanish historian and official of the Afro-Bolivian monarchy

His Excellency Miguel Dongil y Sánchez
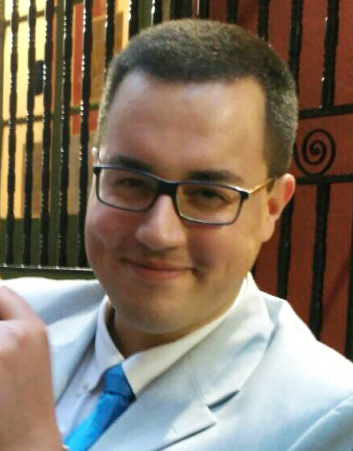
- Dongil y Sánchez in 2016.

Communications Advisor to the Afro-Bolivian Royal House
- Incumbent
- Assumed office 2012
- Monarch: Julio I

Grand Chancellor of Europe of the Royal Order of Merit of Prince Uchicho
- Incumbent
- Assumed office 2013
- Monarch: Julio I

Personal details
- Born: 1987; Gijón, Principality of Asturias, Spain
- Education: University of Oviedo; University of A Coruña
- Occupation: historian
- Website: migueldongil.com

Miguel Dongil y Sánchez, Duke of Dongil (born 1987) is a Spanish historian and academic. He was appointed by King Julio I of the Afro-Bolivians to serve as the Communications Advisor for the Afro-Bolivian monarchy and as Grand Chancellor of Europe of the Royal Order of Merit of Prince Uchicho. He was ennobled by Julio I, becoming the Duke of Dongil.

== Early life and education ==
Dongil y Sánchez was born in 1987 in Gijón, Principality of Asturias.

He graduated in 2010 from the University of Oviedo with a degree in history. He completed postgraduate studies at the University of Oviedo, the National University of Distance Education, and at the Pontifical University of Saint Anthony. He received a doctorate in history from the University of A Coruña in 2017.

In November 2023, he led an educational conference in Asturias titled From Asturias to the Dominican Republic.

== Career ==
Dongil y Sánchez served on the research staff at the University of Oviedo from 2011 to 2015 as a history professor. From 2014 to 2018, he was a researcher and professor at the Pontifical University of Salamanca.

In 2018, he was employed by the Universidad Católica de Santo Domingo as a Christian historian. In 2019, he was hired by the federal government of the Dominican Republic as an international consultant in higher education. He serves as the vice president of the Dominican Academy of Genealogy and Heraldry.

=== Afro-Bolivian monarchy ===
He was appointed by Julio I, the King of the Afro-Bolivians, to serve as the monarchy's communications advisor in 2012. He was named a Knight of the Grand Collar of the Royal Order of Merit of Prince Uchicho and was appointed to serve as the order's Grand Chancellor of Europe in 2013. Dongil y Sánchez was ennobled by Julio I as the Duke of Dongil.

== Honours ==
=== Religious ===
- Brother of Honor of the Holy Brotherhood of the Death and Resurrection of The Lord
- Honorary Knight of the Secular Franciscan Order

=== Dynastic ===
- Grand Chancellor of Europe and Knight of the Grand Collar of the Royal Order of Merit of Prince Uchicho
- King Don Pelayo Medal of the Corps of Nobility of the Principality of Asturias
- Member of the Unione della Nobiltá d'Italia
