= Daudi Kintu Wasajja =

Bugandan king

Prince Daudi Kintu Wasajja
- Born: 19 August 1966 (age 60); Kampala, Buganda, Uganda
- Spouse: Marion Elizabeth Nankya
- Issue: Prince Edward Mbogo
- House: Abalasangeye dynasty
- Father: Kabaka Muteesa II
- Mother: Winifred Keihangwe

Prince Daudi Kintu Wasajja (born 1966), also called David Wasajja, is a prince of Buganda, the largest traditional kingdom in Uganda.

== Personal life ==
He is the youngest son of the late Kabaka Muteesa II, the 35th Kabaka the Kingdom of Buganda, and Winifred Keihangwe, an Ankole princess. Accordingly, he is the youngest brother of Muwenda Mutebi II the current Kabaka of Buganda. He was still in the womb when Milton Obote’s soldiers raided the Mengo Palace in 1966. His pregnant mother, unable to flee, was arrested and locked up in Luzira Prison for several days, only being released for a few hours before going into labor. His father, the Kabaka, had fled the burning palace in disguise.

On 24 November 2018 he survived an accident in Lake Victoria, where a cruise boat carrying party revellers capsized, killing 33 people.

== Education ==
Prince Wasajja holds the degree of Bachelor of Arts (BA) from the University of Nottingham, in the United Kingdom.

== Career ==
Wasajja only returned home in 1996 and was immediately appointed executive underwriter for Pan World Insurance. Later, he moved on to become the retail regional manager for Celtel. In his capacity as a prince he has represented his brother the current Kabaka at high-profile functions, like the wedding of Kyagulanyi Ssentamu Robert aka Bobi Wine and his first lady Barbie Itungo Kyagulanyi). He accompanied his brother at crisis talks between the Kingdom of Buganda and the Republic of Uganda in September 2009 called after rioting in Kampala over the status of the renegade Kayunga District and the closure of a royalist Buganda radio station. Local media claims Wasajja to be one of the eccentric "Hash Harriers", a group of Kampala socialites. He is also an avid runner and shooter.

He was made a Knight of the Grand Cross of the Royal Order of Merit of Prince Uchicho by King Julio I of the Afro-Bolivians.

== Personal life ==
On 25 April 2013, Prince Wasajja wed Ms. Marion Nankya the daughter of the then Member of Parliament for Bukoto South, Mathias Nsubuga. The Catholic wedding was at Rubaga Cathedral with a reception being held at the official residence of the Kabaka in Mengo. It also marked the first time the Kabaka had attended both the church and reception as traditionally he is not supposed to be attend such functions. On 18 January 2014, Ms. Nankya was safely delivered of a baby boy at Nakasero Hospital, in Kampala. The baby was named Prince Edward Mbogo in memory of his late grandfather Sir Edward Mutesa (Muteesa II of Buganda) and his late great-granduncle Nuuhu Mbogo, a renowned Buganda prince and leader of Islam in Buganda. Mbogo was Kabaka Mwanga’s brother.

== Honours ==
- Knight of the Grand Collar of the Royal Order of Merit of Prince Uchicho

== See also ==
- Muwenda Mutebi II of Buganda
- Kabaka of Buganda
