= Alexander David Ssimbwa =

Ugandan diplomat and royal

Prince Alexander David
- Born: 21 March 1934; Kampala, Buganda, Uganda
- Died: 6 November 2014 (aged 80); Kampala, Buganda, Uganda
- House: Abalasangeye dynasty
- Father: Daudi Cwa II
- Mother: Erina Nambawa

Prince Alexander David Ssimbwa (21 March 1934 – 6 November 2014) was a Ugandan royal, diplomat, and revolutionary. He was born a prince of the Kingdom of Buganda as the son of King Daudi Cwa II. In the 1960s, he was arrested during the Mengo Crisis for allegedly conspiring against President Milton Obote. Following his release from prison in 1971, Ssimbwa served as the Ugandan Ambassador to China during the administration of President Yoweri Museveni.

== Biography ==
Ssimbwa was born in Kampala on 21 March 1934 to Erina Nambawa and King Daudi Cwa II, the Kabaka of Buganda. He was the thirty-fifth child of King Daudi Cwa II. Ssimbwa was a half-brother of the future King Mutesa II and the uncle of future King Muwenda Mutebi II.

Following his involvement in a coup d'état in 1966, where he allegedly plotted to assassinate the anti-monarchist Ugandan President Milton Obote, Ssimbwa was arrested at Lubiri Palace, imprisoned, and tortured by military troops loyal to Obote during the Mengo Crisis. He was sentenced to sixty-four years in prison but was released early, in 1971, during the presidency of Idi Amin.

In the 1980s, he joined the liberation struggle during the Ugandan Bush War that brought President Yoweri Museveni into power. During Museveni's administration, Ssimbwa served as Uganda's Ambassador to China.

He later clashed with the Mengo government over issues of land ownership.

Ssimbwa was made a Knight of the Grand Cross of the Royal Order of Merit of Prince Uchicho by King Julio I of the Afro-Bolivians.

He died on 6 November 2014 at Nakasero Hospital. He was buried in the Kasubi Tombs.

== Honours ==
- Knight of the Grand Collar of the Royal Order of Merit of Prince Uchicho
