= General Pinedo =

General Pinedo may refer to:

- General Pinedo, Chaco, a town in Argentina
- Tnte. Gral. Gerardo Pérez Pinedo Airport, a regional airport in Atalaya, Peru

== See also ==
- Pinedo (disambiguation)
