= Julio Pinedo =

Afro-Bolivian king (born 1942)

Julio I
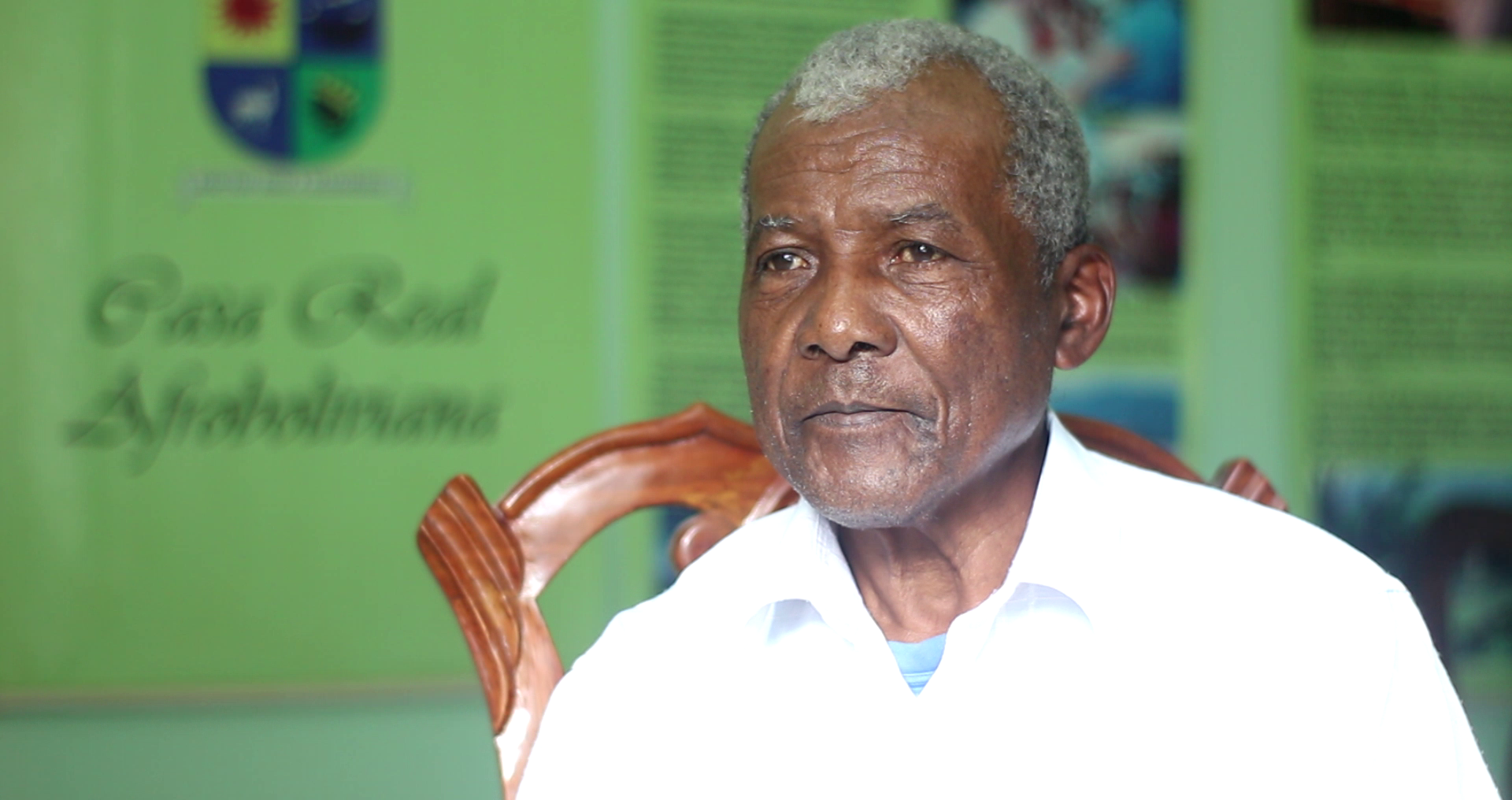

King of the Afro-Bolivians
- Reign: 18 April 1992 – present
- Coronation: 3 November 2007 (Note: Some sources say it's 3 December 2007.)
- Predecessor: Bonifacio I
- Heir apparent: Rolando Julio
- Born: 19 February 1942 (age 84); Mururata, Bolivia
- Spouse: Angélica Larrea (m. 1976)
- Issue: Rolando Pinedo Larrea (adopted)
Names
- Julio Bonifaz Pinedo y Pinedo
- House: Pinedo
- Father: Prince Genaro Pinedo
- Mother: Princess Aurora Pinedo

Styles of King Julio I
- Reference style: His Majesty
- Spoken style: Your Majesty

Don Julio Bonifaz Pinedo y Pinedo (born 19 February 1942) is the ceremonial king of the Afro-Bolivian community of the Nor Yungas province, crowned in 1992, forty years after the death of the previous king, his grandfather Bonifacio Pinedo. His coronation took place during a Catholic ceremony in the chapel at the hacienda of the Marquis de Pinedo.

== Early life ==
Julio was born on 19 February 1942 in Mururata to Prince Genaro Pinedo and Princess Aurora Pinedo. He is a descendent of Uchicho, an African prince who was enslaved by the Spanish and brought to Bolivia, where he was later appointed as the first Afro-Bolivian king. At the time of his birth, his maternal grandfather Bonifacio Pinedo, reigned as the King of the Afro-Bolivians. Following his grandfather's death in 1954, Julio's mother became Princess Regent, until he was old enough to succeed the title.

== Reign ==
He was crowned by the Afro-Bolivians as King Julio I on 18 April 1992, during a Catholic coronation ceremony at the chapel of the hacienda of the Marquis de Pinedo. His position as King of the Afro-Bolivians gained official recognition from the Bolivian government in 2007, when he was officially installed by the prefect of La Paz.

As king, he is the sovereign and Grand Master of the Royal Order of Merit of Prince Uchicho. He appointed Bishop Juan Vargas Aruquipa, Prince Alexander David Ssimbwa of Buganda, Prince Daudi Kintu Wasajja of Buganda, Katikkiro John Baptist Walusimbi of Buganda, Miguel Dongil y Sánchez, and Francisco Manuel de las Heras y Borrero to the order.

In 2016, he went on a royal tour to Senegal, the Democratic Republic of the Congo, and Uganda.

In 2019, Julio was made a Knight Grand Cross of the Most Honorable Order of Omukama Chwa II Kabalega by King Solomon Iguru I of Bunyoro.

== Marriage and family life ==
Julio married Angélica Larrea in 1976. He and Angélica have no biological children, but adopted his nephew and heir, Prince Rolando.

He is Catholic and, when not performing royal duties, works as a farmer and shop owner in Mururata.

== Honours ==
- Grand Master of the Royal Order of Merit of Prince Uchicho
- Knight Grand Cross of the Most Honorable Order of Omukama Chwa II Kabalega

== Notes ==
Julio Pinedo Afro-Bolivian Royal House Born: 19 February 1942
Royal titles
Preceded by Aurora Pinedo as princess-regent	Afro-Bolivian King; 1992–present	Incumbent; Heir apparent: Rolando Julio Pinedo Larrea
