= Bonifacio Pinedo =

Afro-Bolivian king

Bonifacio I
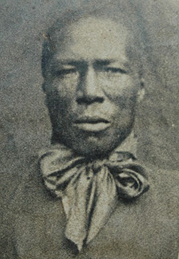

King of the Afro-Bolivians
- Reign: 1932 – 1954
- Predecessor: José María Pinedo
- Successor: Aurora Pinedo (as princess regent)
- Born: 1888; Nor Yungas Province, Bolivia
- Died: 1954 (aged 65–66); Mururata, Bolivia
- Burial: Hacienda de Pinedo
- Spouse: Juliana Zabala; Cecilia Barra
- Issue: Prince Carmelo; Prince Manuel; Prince Juan; Princess Aurora
- House: Pinedo
- Father: José María Pinedo
- Mother: Gregoria Iriondo

The coat of arms of Bonifacio Pinedo.

Don Bonifacio Pinedo (1888 – 1954) was the King of the Afro-Bolivians from 1932 to 1954. As the ceremonial king, he presided over religious festivities celebrating Saint Benedict the Moor and was responsible for matchmaking in the Afro-Bolivian community. His role was suppressed during the Bolivian National Revolution.

== Early life and ancestry ==
Pinedo was born in 1888 in the Nor Yungas Province to José María Pinedo and Gregoria Iriondo. He had a brother, Cipriano. Pinedo was the grandson of Andrés Pinedo and Antonia Zavala. He is a descendant of a noble African tribe that resided in the Congo at a time before France and Belgium colonized the region. His ancestor, Prince Uchicho of either the Kingdom of Kongo or Senegal, was captured and enslaved by the Spanish, who brought him to Bolivia in 1820 to work on an hacienda. In 1832, Prince Uchicho was crowned by the former slaves as the first King of the Afro-Bolivians. The family adopted the surname Pinedo, after their former enslaver the Marquis of Pinedo.

== Reign ==
Pinedo was crowned as king of the Afro-Bolivian monarchy in 1932, succeeding Don José Pinedo.

As king, he presided over the festivities of the feast of Saint Benedict of the Moor in Mururata. During the religious procession, while dressed in a royal garb including a crown, scepter, sash, and embroidered cape, he was carried on a litter by members of the Afro-Bolivian community. Pinedo then opened the performing of ceremonial dances by dancing the zemba. The ceremony continued with performances of the tundiqui and saya dances.

Pinedo was responsible for matchmaking in his community and assisting couples in resolving marital disputes.

With the outbreak of the Bolivian National Revolution in 1952, his ceremonial role was suppressed.

== Marriage and issue ==
Bonifacio was first married to Juliana Zabala. They had two children, Prince Carmelo and Prince Manuel, who both predeceased him. He was married a second time to Cecilia Barra. They had multiple daughters, including Aurora, and a son named Juan. Juan predeceased his father.

== Death ==
Pinedo died in 1954 without a male heir. He was buried at the hacienda of the Marquis de Pinedo, near Mururata. Following his death, his eldest daughter Doña Aurora Pinedo succeeded him as princess regent until the ascension of his grandson, Julio I in 1992.

Pinedo's tomb was restored by King Julio I and Queen Angélica Larrea, but was later damaged by vandals.
