= Mururata (village) =

- Village
- Location within Bolivia
- Coordinates: 16°08′37″S 67°44′19″W
- Country: Bolivia
- Department: La Paz Department

Government
  - Type: ceremonial monarchy
  - King of the Afro-Bolivians: Julio Pinedo
- Time zone: BOT

Mururata is a village in the tropical valleys of the Bolivian Yungas in central Bolivia. It is a centre of Afro-Bolivian culture and the seat of the ceremonial Afro-Bolivian monarchy.

The area was originally populated during the 16th century. Under Spanish colonialism, African slave labour was used in the silver mines from the 17th century onwards. In the 19th century, after the abolition of slavery, freed slaves established the village of Mururata.

The majority of the population of Mururata are Catholic and incorporate elements of African diasporic religions, such as rituals in the Macumba and Voodoo religions, in their practice of Christianity.

== Notable people ==
- Bonifacio Pinedo (1888–1954), King of the Afro-Bolivians from 1932 to 1954
- Aurora Pinedo (1910–1992), Princess Regent of the Afro-Bolivians from 1954 to 1992
- Julio Pinedo (born 1942), current King of the Afro-Bolivians
- Angélica Larrea (born 1944), current Queen consort of the Afro-Bolivians, former mayor of Mururata
- Rolando Pinedo Larrea (born 1994), current Crown Prince of the Afro-Bolivians
