= Angélica Larrea =

Afro-Bolivian Queen

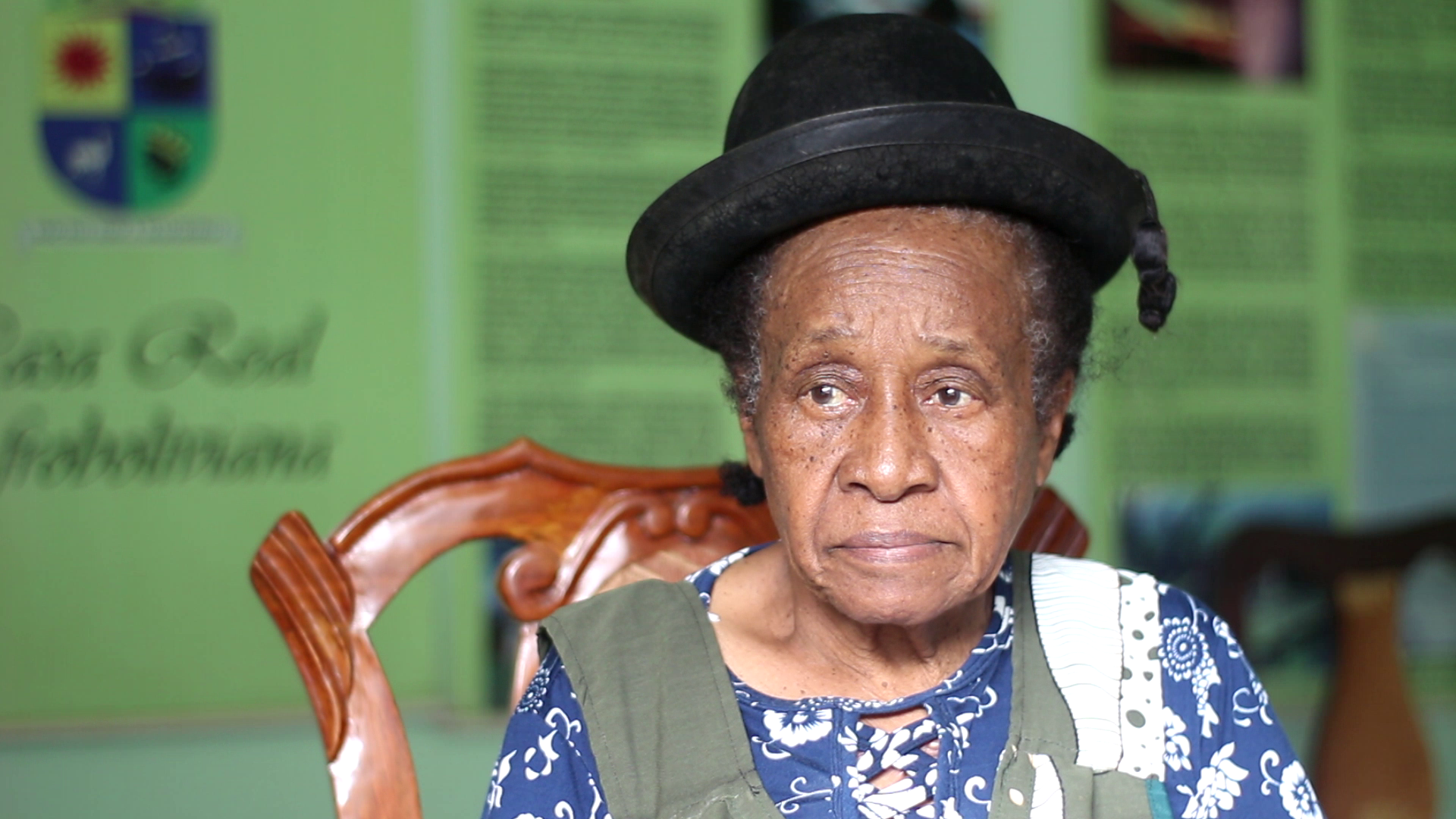

Queen consort of the Afro-Bolivians
- Reign: 18 April 1992 – present
- Coronation: 18 April 1992 (ceremonial); 3 December 2007 (official)
- Born: 1944 (age 81–82); Santa Ana del Yacuma, Beni, Bolivia
- Spouse: Julio Pinedo
- Issue: Rolando Pinedo Larrea (adopted)
- House: Pinedo (by marriage)
- Occupation: politician, grocer, shop owner, farmer

Styles of Queen Angélica
- Reference style: Her Majesty
- Spoken style: Your Majesty

Doña Angélica Larrea de Pinedo (born 1944) is the Ceremonial Queen of the Afro-Bolivians, as the wife of Ceremonial King Julio Pinedo. She twice served as the mayor of Mururata, the village where the ceremonial monarchy is based. She and her husband were officially recognize by the Bolivian government as the Afro-Bolivian ceremonial monarchs in 2007.

== Biography ==
Larrea was born in 1944 in Santa Ana del Yacuma.

She married Julio Pinedo in 1976. Her husband succeeded his grandfather, Bonifacio Pinedo, as Ceremonial King of the Afro-Bolivians in 1992. Their ceremonial coronation took place in a Catholic service on 18 April 1992. Bonifacio died in 1954, and between his death and her husband's succession, her mother-in-law Doña Aurora led the community. Pinedo and Larrea's official coronation ceremony, held by the government in La Paz, took place on 3 December 2007.

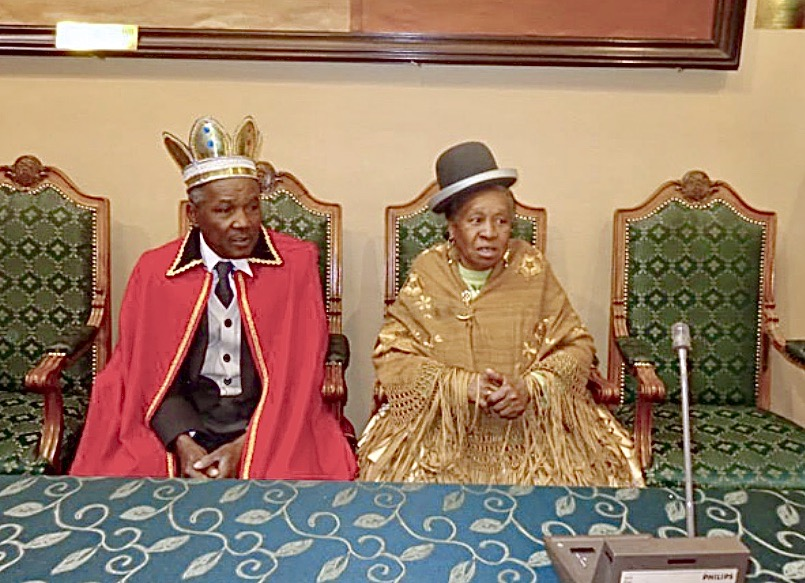
Larrea and her husband in their ceremonial robes

The couple, who have no biological children, adopted their nephew and heir, Prince Ronaldo. Larrea and her husband are Catholic.

Larrea and her family live on their farm in Mururata, Nor Yungas Province. She runs a small grocery store and co-manages the family farm. She operates her store from the first floor of her home, located fifty meters from Mururata's main square.

Larrea twice served as mayor of Mururata. In 2013, she enrolled in adult educational classes to improve her reading and writing abilities.

In 2016, Larrea accompanied her husband and son on an official trip to Senegal, the Democratic Republic of the Congo, and Uganda.
