= Uchicho =

Afro-Bolivian king

King of the Afro-Bolivians
- Coronation: 1823
- Predecessor: Monarchy established
- Successor: Bonifaz Pinedo
- Born: Kingdom of Kongo
- House: Pinedo

Uchicho was the first King of the Afro-Bolivians. According to tradition, he was captured and brought from Africa to Bolivia as a slave around 1820. He was crowned as Afro-Bolivian king in 1823.

== Biography ==
Uchicho was born in either the Kingdom of Kongo or Senegal into a tribal royal family. He was captured and enslaved and brought to Upper Peru, a province of the Spanish Empire, around 1820. He was enslaved by the Marquis de Pinedo at an hacienda in the Los Yungas.

Allegedly, Uchicho bore tribal marks only held by royalty, and was therefore recognized by other slaves as a prince.

Uchicho was crowned King of the Afro-Bolivians by the slave community in 1823. Two years later, slavery was abolished in Bolivia. Uchicho was succeeded as king by Bonifaz, who later adopted the surname Pinedo from the plantation owner.

== Legacy ==
The Royal Order of Merit of Prince Uchicho, the Afro-Bolivian monarchy's official dynastic order of merit founded in 2012, is named after him.
