= Afro-Bolivian monarchy =

Ceremonial monarchy in Bolivia

King of the Afro-Bolivians
- Rey Afroboliviano (Spanish)

Incumbent
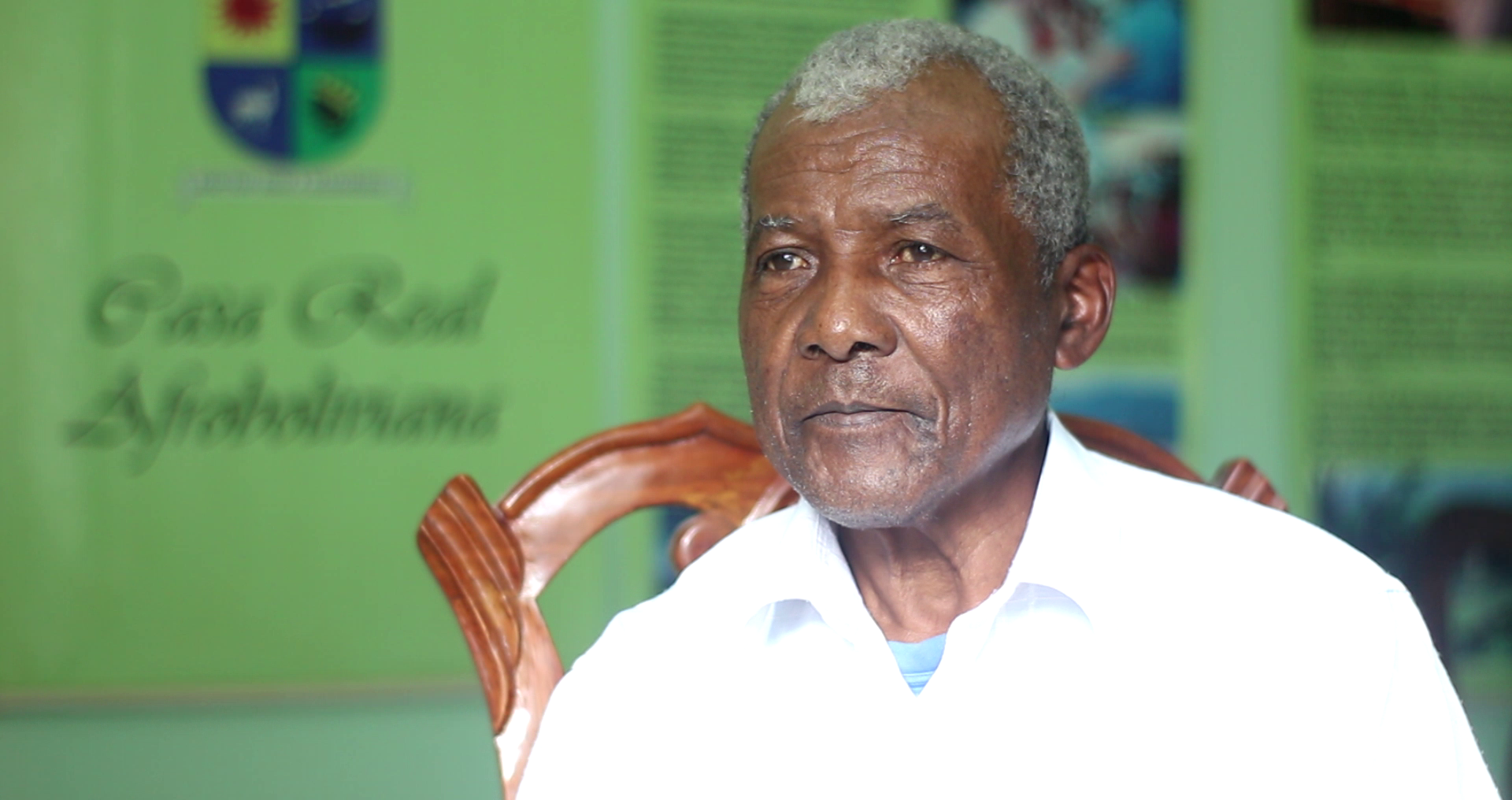
- Julio I since 18 April 1992

Details
- Style: His Majesty
- Heir apparent: Prince Rolando Julio
- First monarch: Uchicho
- Formed: 1823
- Website: casarealafroboliviana.org

The Afro-Bolivian Royal House (Spanish: la Casa Real Afroboliviana) is a ceremonial monarchy recognized as part of the Plurinational State of Bolivia, which does not interfere with the system of the Presidential republic in force within the country. It was established in 1823 with the coronation of King Uchicho and is centered in Mururata, a village in the Yungas region of Bolivia. The monarchy is treated as a customary leader of the Afro-Bolivian community. The powers of the Afro-Bolivian king are similar to those of a traditional king, representing the Afro-Bolivian community. The current Afro-Bolivian monarchs are King Julio Pinedo and Queen Angélica Larrea.

== History ==
The components of this royal house are the descendants of an old African tribal monarchy that were brought to Bolivia as slaves. The founding monarch, Uchicho, was allegedly of Kongo and Senegalese origin, and was brought to the hacienda of the Marquis de Pinedo, in the area of Los Yungas in what is now La Paz Department. Other slaves allegedly recognized him as a man of regal background (a prince from the ancient Kingdom of Kongo) when seeing his torso exposed with royal tribal marks only held by royalty. He was crowned in 1823, and was succeeded by Bonifaz, who adopted the surname of Pinedo, the plantation owner. Bonifaz was succeeded by Don José and Don Bonifacio, the latter of whom was born in 1880 and crowned in 1932. When Bonifacio died in 1954, the house was led by his oldest daughter Doña Aurora Pinedo. Because of the lack of a male heir, the kingdom was left without a king for 38 years. Aurora's oldest son, Julio Pinedo, was given the title of king in 1992. His wife, Angélica Larrea, became queen upon her husband's ascension.

The Royal House was officially recognized by the Bolivian state in 2007 with the public coronation of Julio, the current King of the Afro-Bolivian community, which was done by the authorities of the La Paz Department. They are a ceremonial monarchy, similar to a traditional tribal chiefdom, and have no police force nor do they collect taxes from citizens.

King Julio has a son, Prince Rolando, who was born in 1994. By 2021 he was studying law at the Universidad de Los Andes in La Paz and preparing for his prospective role as king, stating that his ambitions were to "keep pushing forward to make the Afro-Bolivian community more recognised and visible, the way my father has done until now".

== List of monarchs ==
- Uchicho
- Bonifaz Pinedo
- José Pinedo
- Bonifacio Pinedo
- Aurora Pinedo (as princess regent)
- Julio Pinedo

The heir apparent is the present king's nephew and adopted son, Crown Prince Rolando Julio Pinedo Larrea.

== Order of Merit ==
Flag of the Afro-Bolivian monarchy

King Julio I established a dynastic order and order of merit, named in honor of the first Afro-Bolivian king, on 5 January 2012. The Afro-Bolivian king serves as the sovereign Grand Master of the dynastic order, called the Royal Order of Merit of Prince Uchicho (Spanish: Gran Cruz de la Real Orden del Mérito del Príncipe Uchicho). The order is awarded by the monarch motu proprio, at the proposal of the representative authorities of the Afro-Bolivian community, or by the request of the interested party upon presenting a succinct list of the merits acquired in favor of the Royal House or the community and the documentation that accredits them.

The Royal Order of Merit of Prince Uchicho's governance:

- His Majesty The Grand Master
- Their Most Reverend Excellency The Spiritual Protector, a Catholic official who represents the order's spiritual patron.
- The Grand Chancelleries
  - Their Excellencies The Grand Chancellors of Africa (The Crown Prince), the Americas (The Duke of Mururata), Asia, Europe (The Duke of Dongil), and Oceania.

The degrees of the order are:

- Grand Collar of the Order of Merit (Gran Collar): awarded to heads of state, heads of non-reigning royal houses, presidents of government institutions, and presidents of international organizations.
- Grand Cross of the Order of Merit (Gran Cruz): awarded to Afro-Bolivians, and foreign nationals, who contributed to the Afro-Bolivian Community, supported the king, and supported international causes especially pertaining to Africa.
- Parcel with Plate of the Order of Merit (Encomienda con Placa): awarded to Bolivian nationals and foreign nationals distinguished by valuable conduct towards the Afro-Bolivian community and the king.
- Parcel of the Order of Merit (Encomienda): awarded to Bolivian nationals and foreign nationals distinguished by especially valuable conduct towards the Afro-Bolivian Community.
- Officers Cross of the Order of Merit (Cruz de Oficial): awarded to Bolivian nationals and foreign nationals distinguished by valuable conduct towards the Afro-Bolivian community.

Notable recipients of the order include Bishop Juan Vargas y Aruquipa; Miguel Dongil y Sánchez; Francisco Manuel de las Heras y Borrero; Prime Minister John Baptist Walusimbi of Buganda; Prince David Alexander Ssimbwa of Buganda; Prince Daudi Kintu Wasajja of Buganda; and King Solomon Iguru I of Bunyoro.
