= Rolando Pinedo Larrea =

Afro-Bolivian crown prince

Rolando Julio
- Crown Prince of the Afro-Bolivians
- Born: 30 July 1994 (age 32); Mururata, Nor Yungas Province, Bolivia
- House: Pinedo
- Father: Julio I (adoptive)
- Mother: Angélica Larrea (adoptive)
- Occupation: lawyer

Styles of The Crown Prince
- Reference style: His Royal Highness
- Spoken style: Your Royal Highness

Don Rolando Julio Pinedo y Larrea, Crown Prince of the Afro-Bolivians (born 30 July 1994) is a Bolivian lawyer and a member of the Afro-Bolivian royal family. As the nephew, and adopted son, of King Julio I, he is the current heir to the Afro-Bolivian throne. He serves as the Grand Chancellor of Africa of the Royal Order of Merit of Prince Uchicho.

== Early life and education ==
Rolando was born on 30 July 1994 in the village of Mururata in the Nor Yungas Province of La Paz, Bolivia. He is the nephew and adopted son, and heir, of King Julio I and Queen Angélica Larrea.

He attended university in La Paz from 2012 to 2014, studying humanities and international business. In 2021, he began law school at the Universidad de Los Andes in La Paz.

== Career ==
Rolando worked as an administrator in the Plurinational Legislative Assembly from 2014 to 2015. In 2016, he began working in the Departmental Legislative Assembly of La Paz.

== Royal duties ==
Rolando serves as the Grand Chancellor of Africa of the Royal Order of Merit of Prince Uchicho.

In 2016, he accompanied the king and queen on an official trip to Senegal, the Democratic Republic of the Congo, and Uganda.

== Honours ==
- Grand Chancellor of Africa of the Royal Order of Merit of Prince Uchicho
