= Afro-Bolivians =

Ethnic group in Bolivia

Afroboliviano (Spanish)
- Flag of the Afro-Bolivian Monarchy

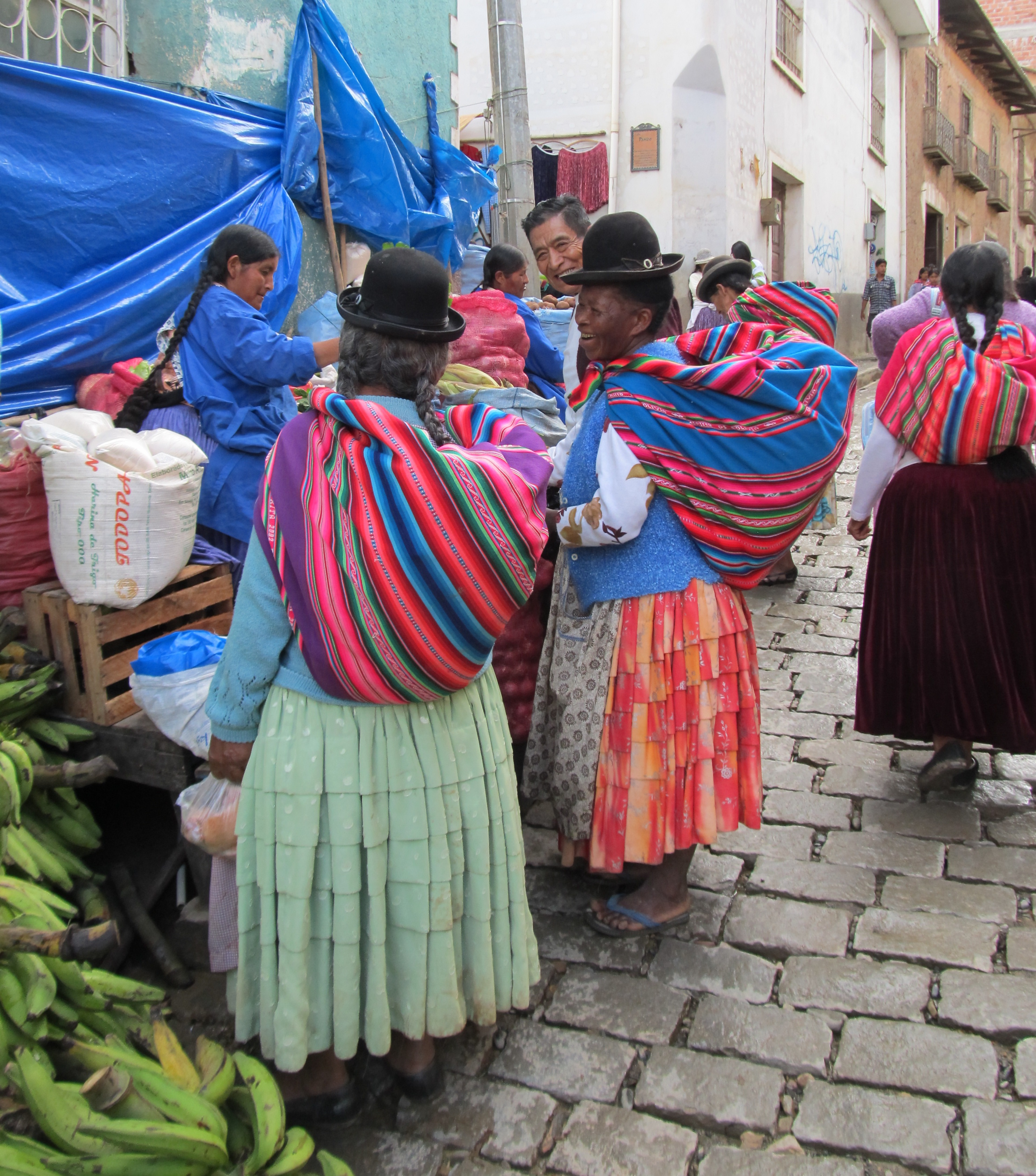
- An Afro-Bolivian woman dressed in traditional Andean clothing in Coroico

Total population
- 25,168 (2024 census); 0.22% of the Bolivian population

Regions with significant populations
- Los Yungas

Languages
- Spanish

Religion
- Catholicism • Traditional

Related ethnic groups
- West Africans, Central Africans, Afro-Latin Americans and Bolivians

Afro-Bolivians (Spanish: Afrobolivianos), also known as Black Bolivians (Spanish: Bolivianos Negros), are Bolivians who have predominantly or total Sub-Saharan African ancestry and therefore the descriptive "Afro-Bolivian" may refer to historical or cultural elements in Bolivia thought to emanate from their community. It can also refer to the combining of African and other cultural elements found in Bolivian society such as religion, music, language, the arts, and class culture. The Afro-Bolivians are recognized as one of the constituent ethnic groups of Bolivia by the country's government, and are ceremonially led by a king who traces his descent back to a line of monarchs that reigned in Africa during the medieval period. They numbered 23,000 according to the 2012 census.

== History of slavery in Bolivia ==
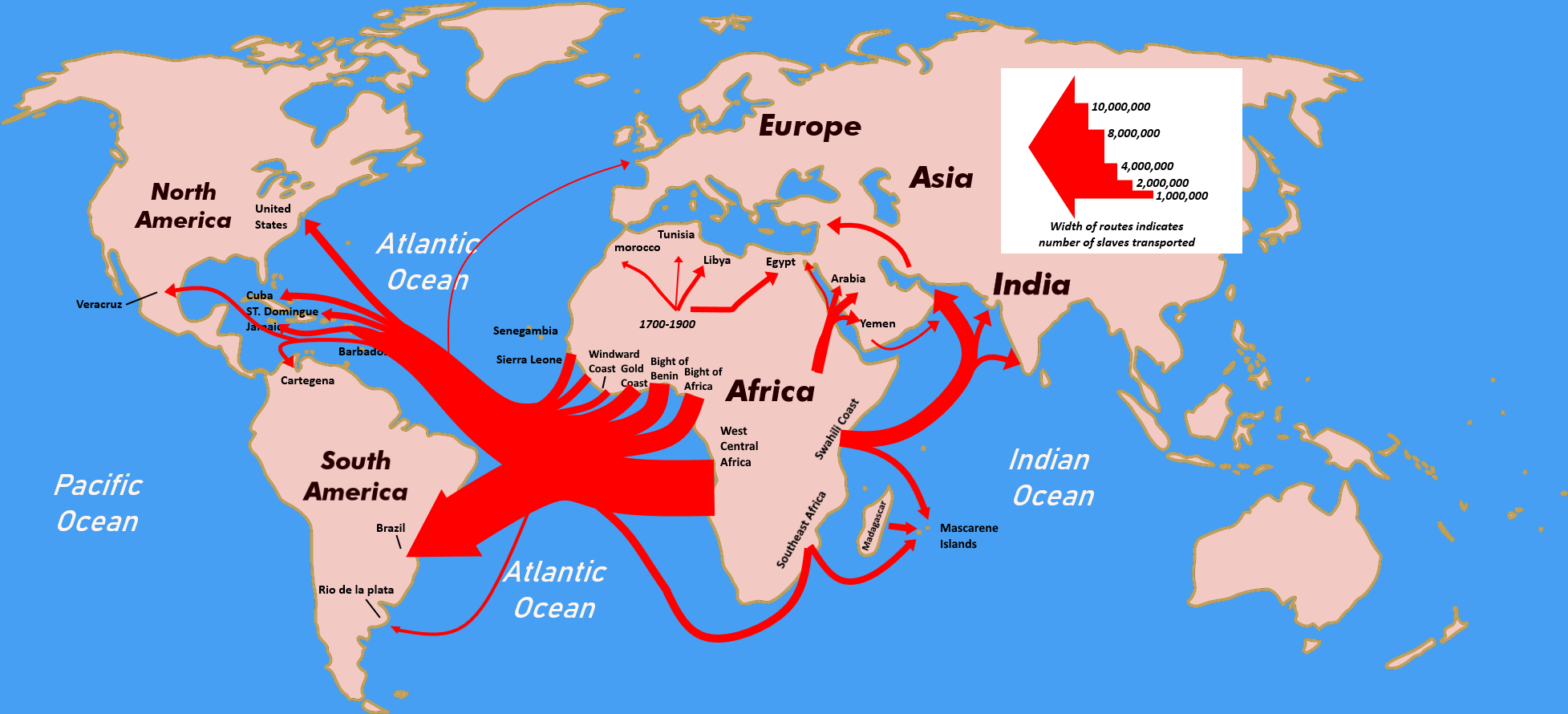
Map of the Trans-Atlantic slave trade. Slaves from Bolivia were often bought from port cities of the Spanish colonies.

Slaves were brought as early as the 16th century in Bolivia to work in mines. In Potosí during the 17th century 30,000 Africans were brought to work in the mines from which the total population of Potosí which numbered around 200,000. Slaves were more expensive in Bolivia then other parts of the Spanish colonies costing upwards to 800 pesos. This was due to the fact that they had to be bought from slave ports in the coastal region of the Spanish empire and had to trek from cities like Cartagena, Montevideo, and Buenos Aires to Bolivia.

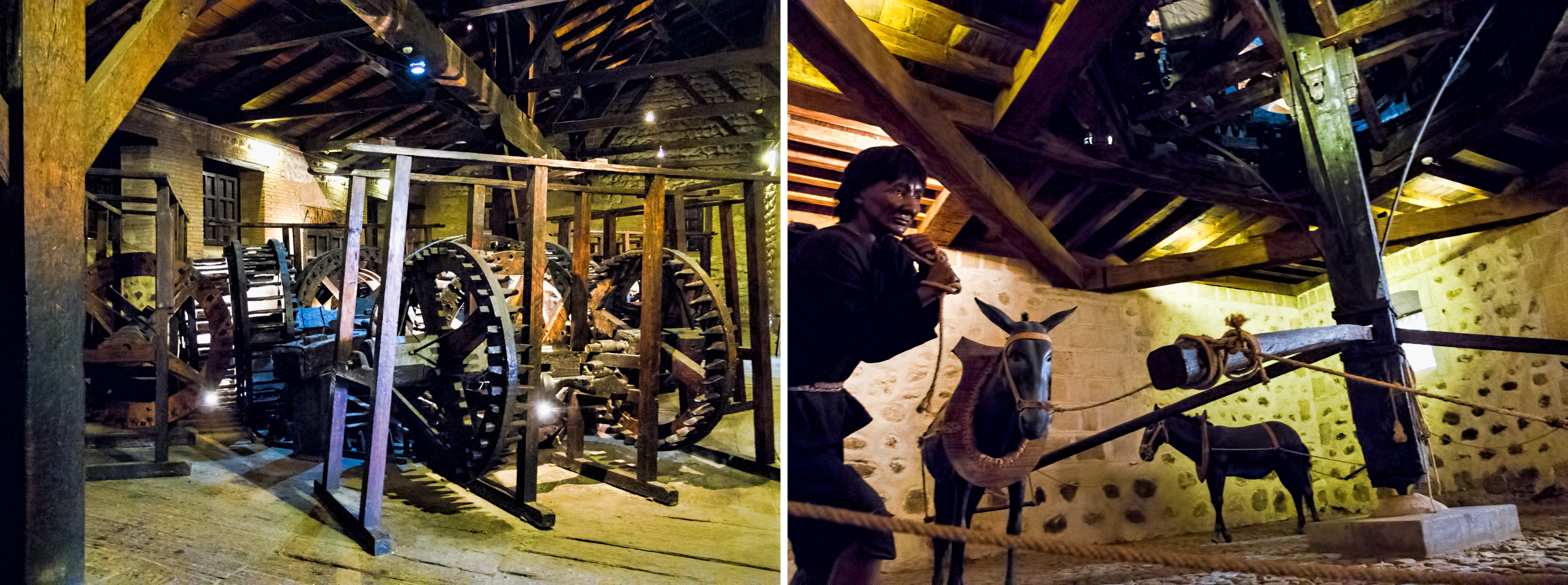
The National Mint where mills would press silver ingots, extracted by slave labor, to make coins.

Slaves were put to work in difficult conditions.

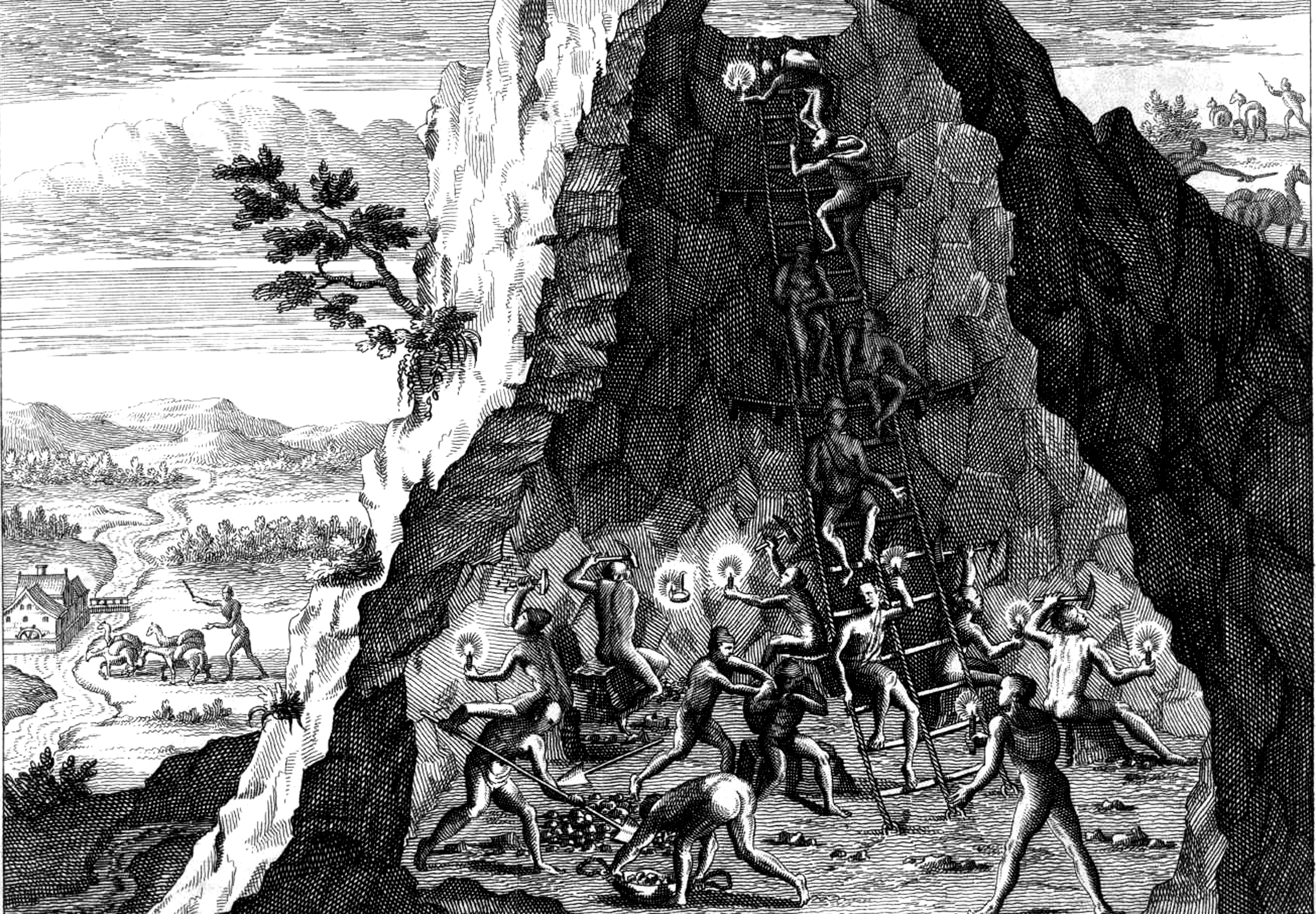
The mine of Cerro Rico where both Indigenous and African slave labor was used to mine for precious metals.

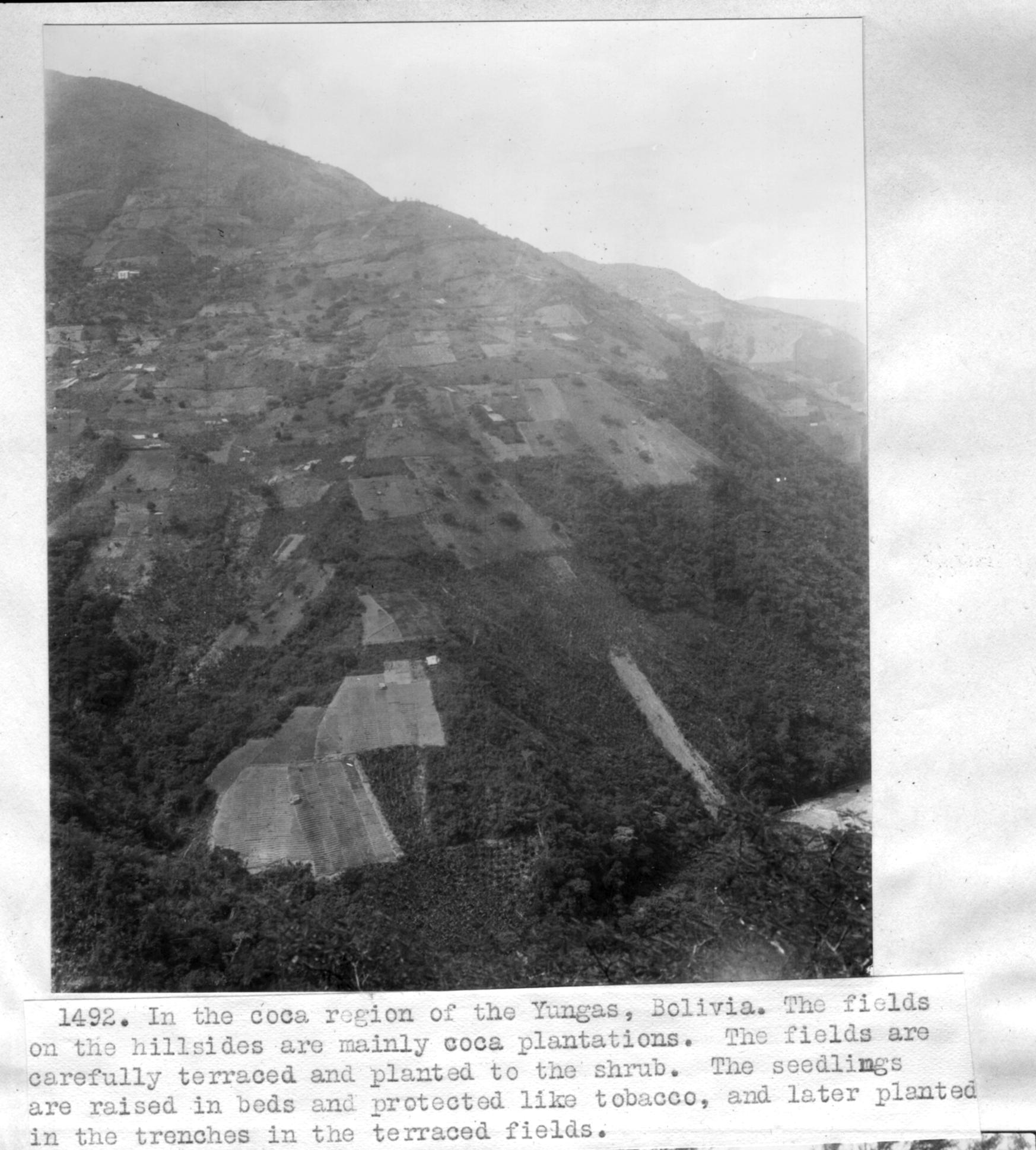
A coca plantation in the Yungas region of Bolivia in 1924 where historically cultivation had been done using slave labor.

Many newly brought slaves died due to the weather. Coca leaves helped with alleviating altitude sickness. Just like the mines of Potosí, coca plantations became a cash-crop of the region. Thousands of slaves were shipped to cultivate and process coca leaves on Haciendas, like the ancestors of Julio Pinedo.

== The Yungas ==
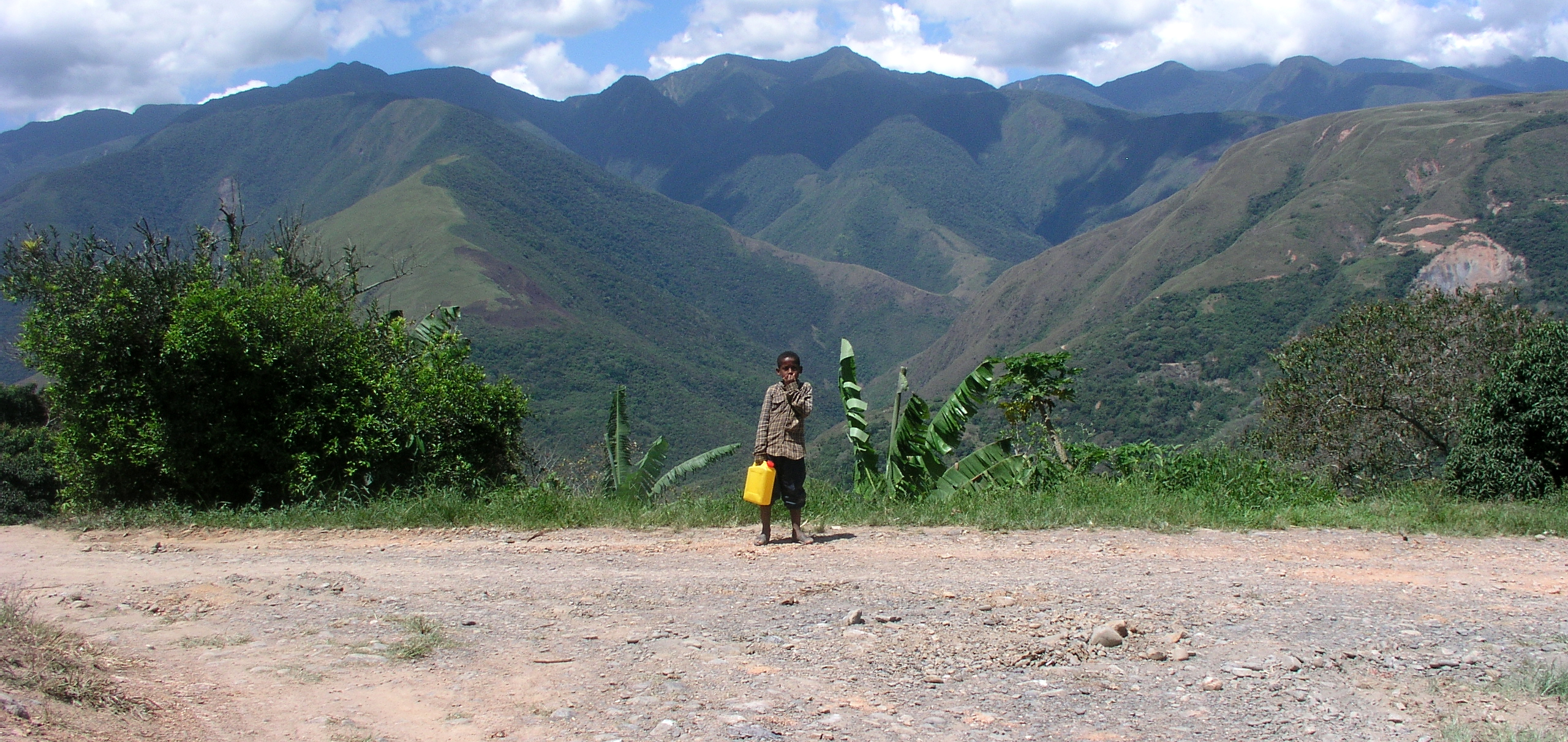
An Afro-Bolivian child from Coroico.

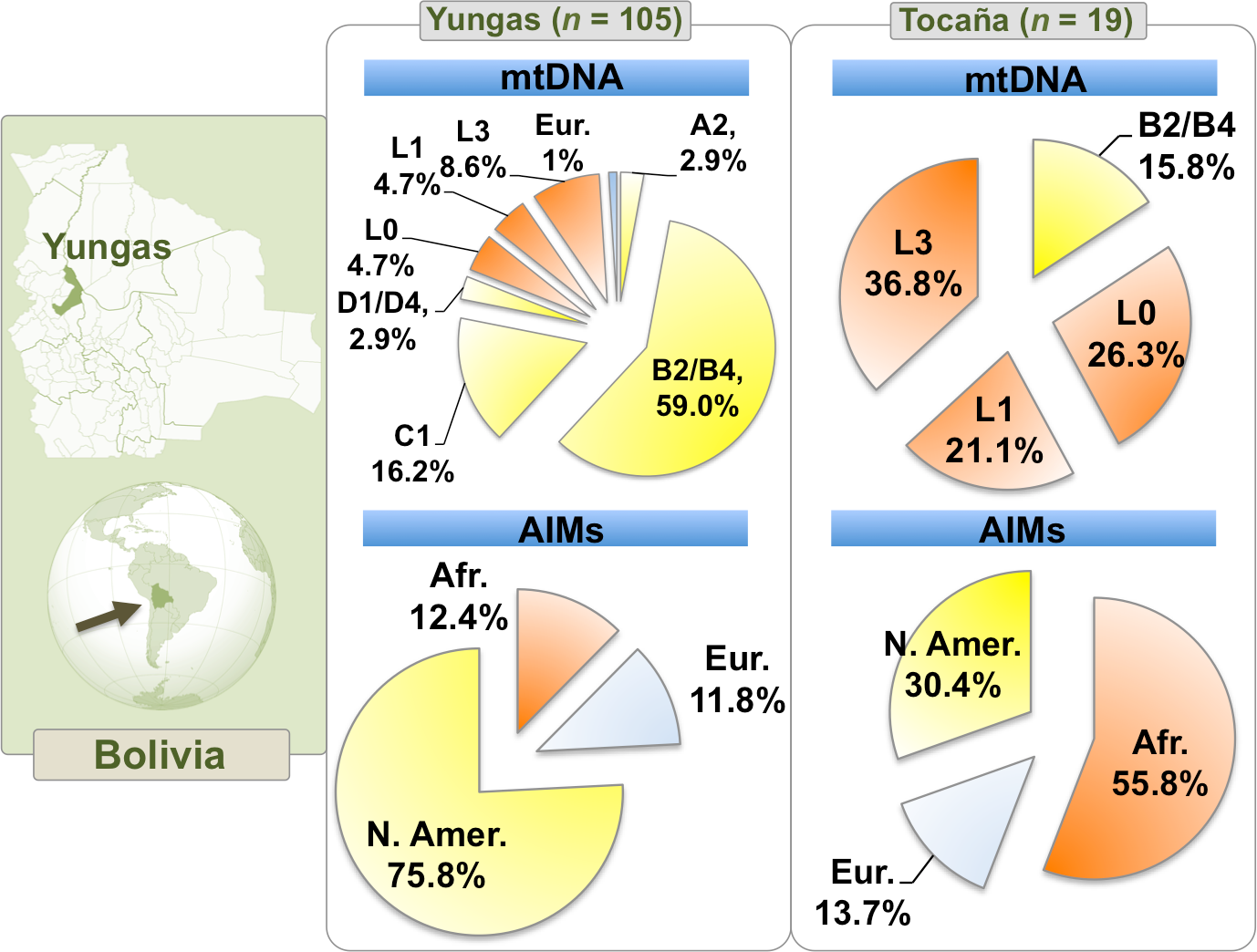
MtDNA haplogroups and continental ancestry based on AIMs. Samples are from Yungas (left) and Tocaña (right).

Their move occurred during the year 1827 (although its enforcement being postponed to 1851), The indigenous Aymara people and mestizos lived in the Yungas before the Afro-Bolivians.

== Culture ==
=== Saya music ===
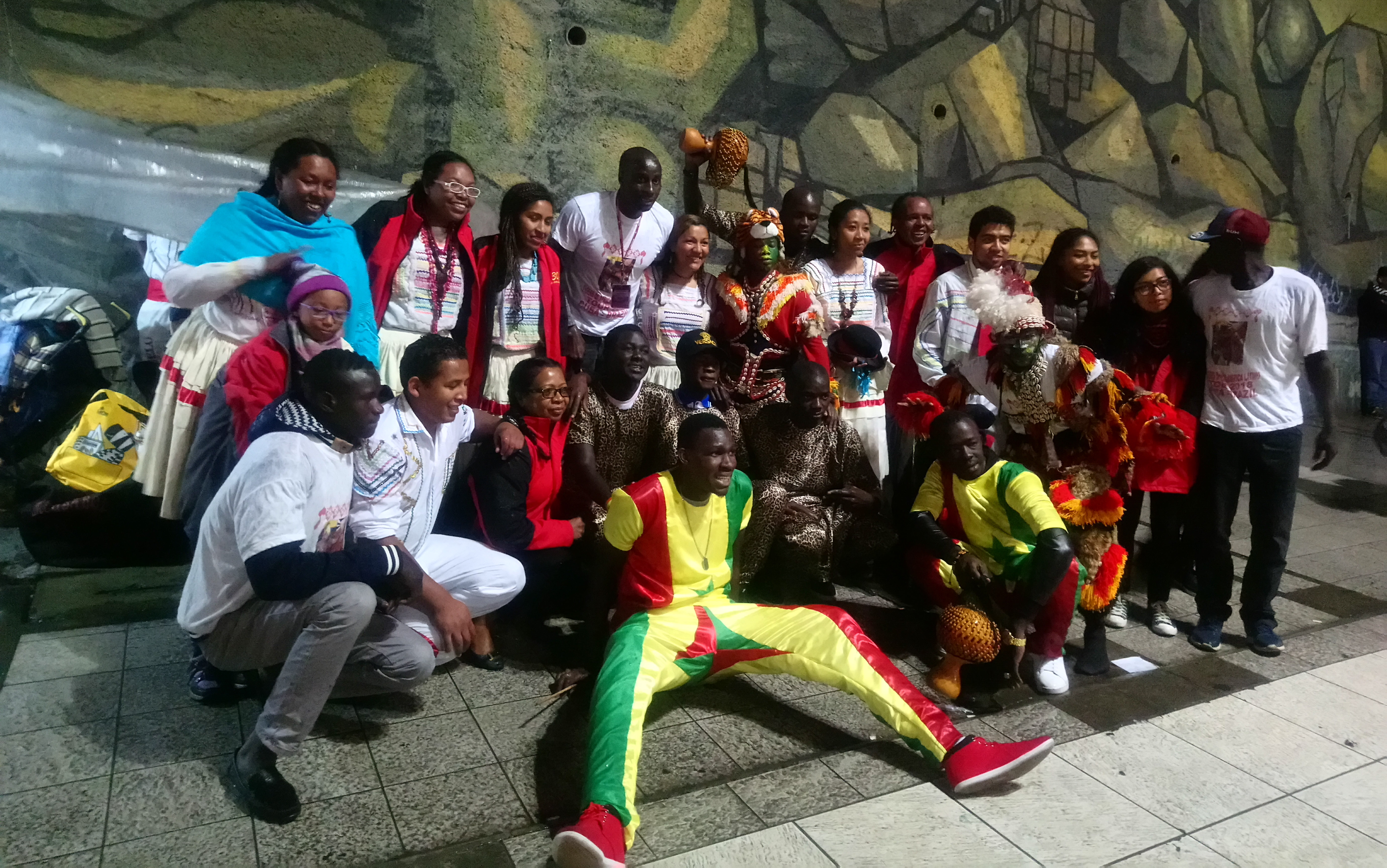
Black Bolivian saya group called The Tigers of Africa in a Celebration of the Afro descendants in La Paz (2018).

The word saya originates from Kikongo nsaya, referring to the act of singing while performing communal work.

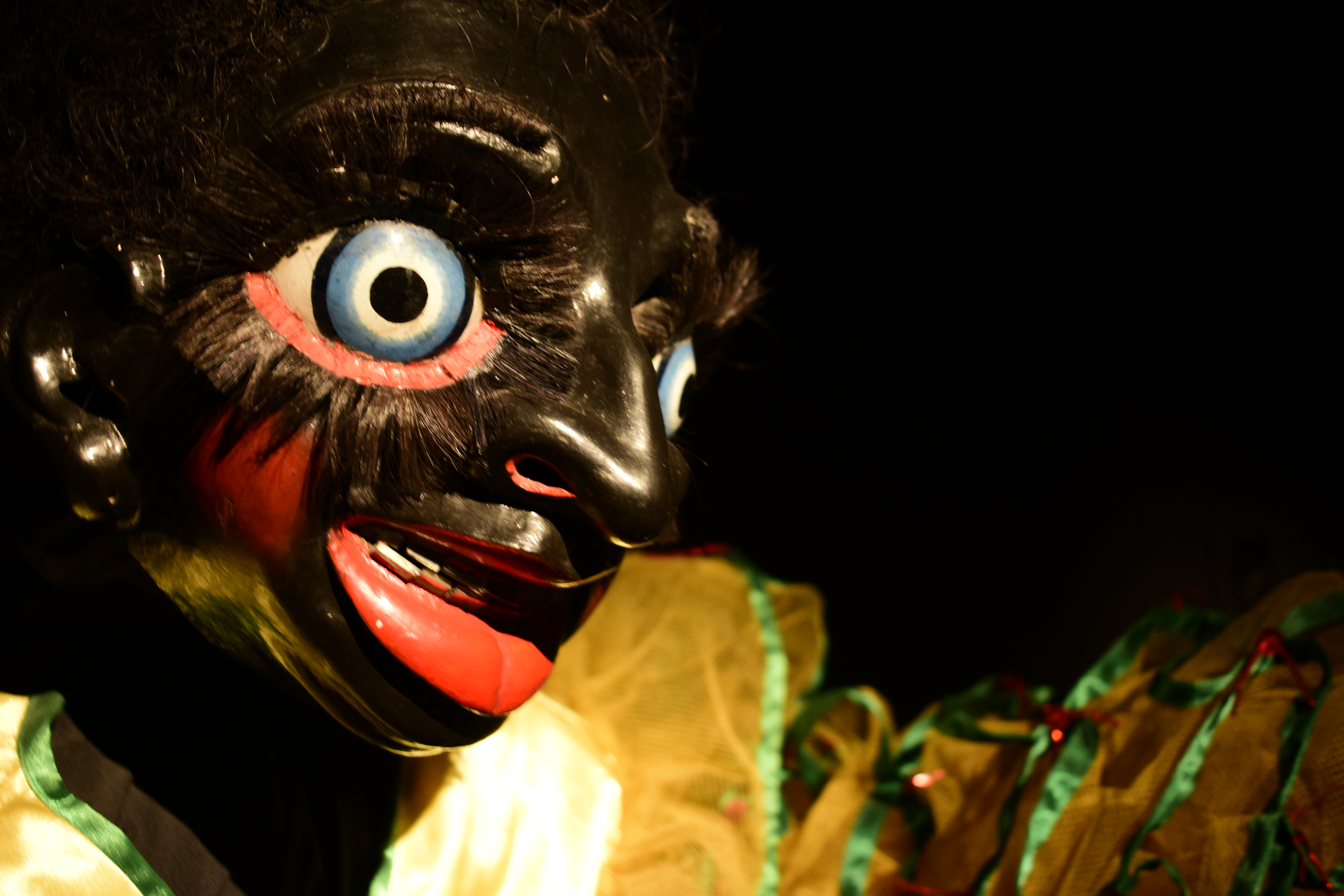
An example of a traditional Afro-Bolivian saya mask.

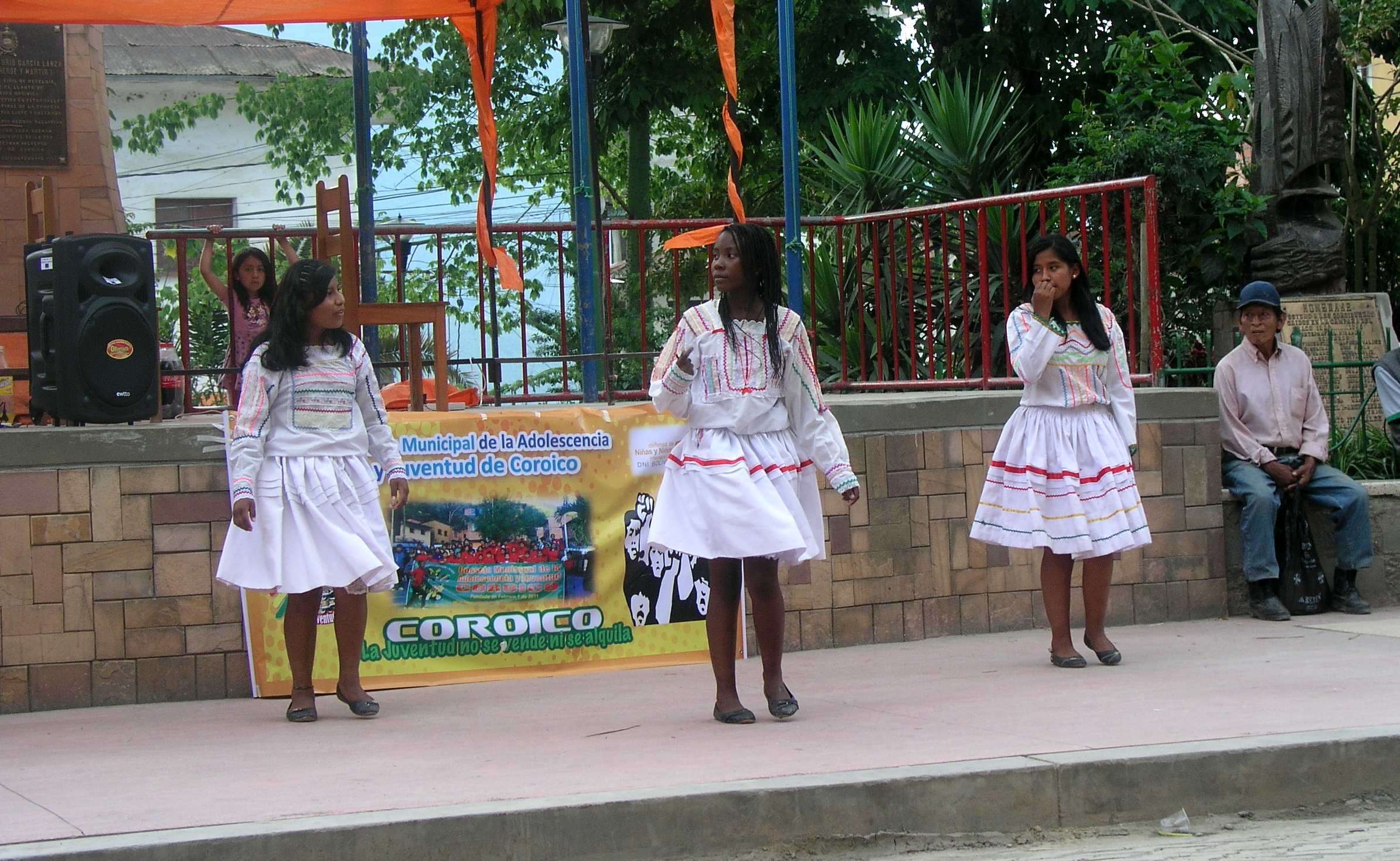
An Afro-Bolivian girl in traditional clothing dancing saya in Coroico.

=== Caporales ===
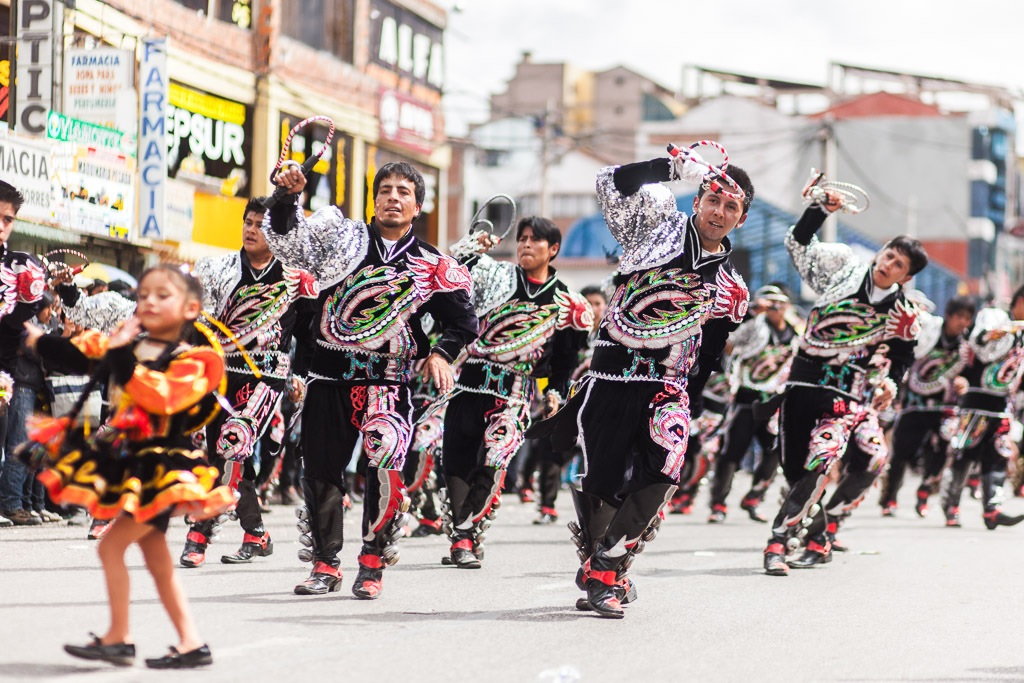
Caporales dancers in modernity from Bolivia. (2016)

Caporales is a dance popular in the Andean region of Bolivia. It gained popularity in 1969 by the Estrada Pacheco brothers, inspired by the character of the 'Caporal' or "overseer" of which, historically black slaves, usually mixed race, wore boots and held a whip, the dance originates from the region of the Yungas in Bolivia. However, elements of the dance (such as the costumes) were of European origin.

=== Morenada ===
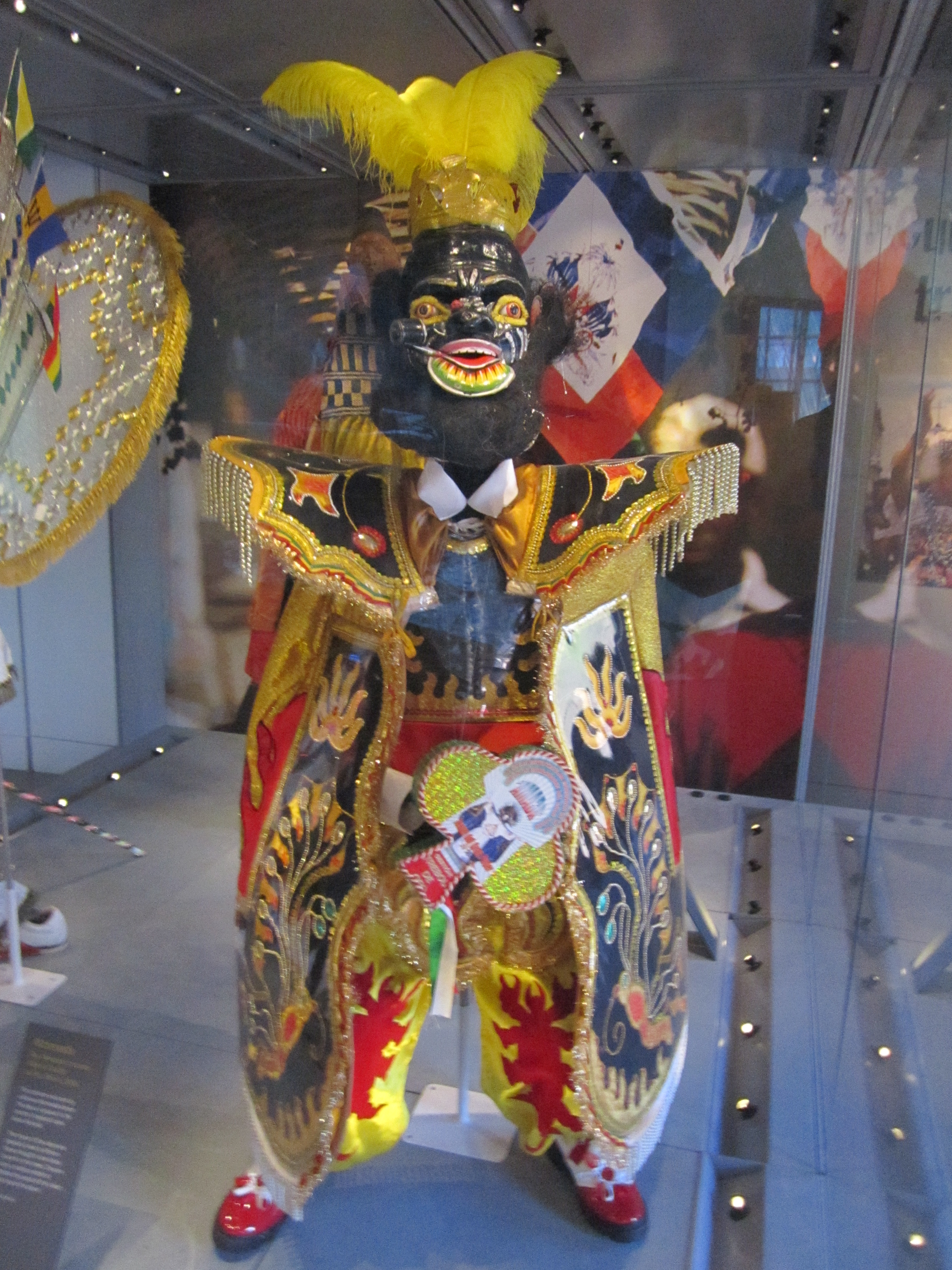
An example of a Morenada costume from Bolivia showcased at the International Slavery Museum.

Morenada is a folkloric dance in Bolivia. The dance originated with sufferings of the African slaves brought to Bolivia in order to work in the Silver Mines of Potosí. The enormous tongue of the dark masks was meant to represent the physical state of these mines workers and the rattling of the Matracas are frequently associated with the rattling of the slaves' chains and satirizing "white men".

=== Language ===
Afro-Bolivians have traditionally maintained their own creole language, with links to earlier Bozal Spanish.

=== Afro-Bolivian monarchy ===
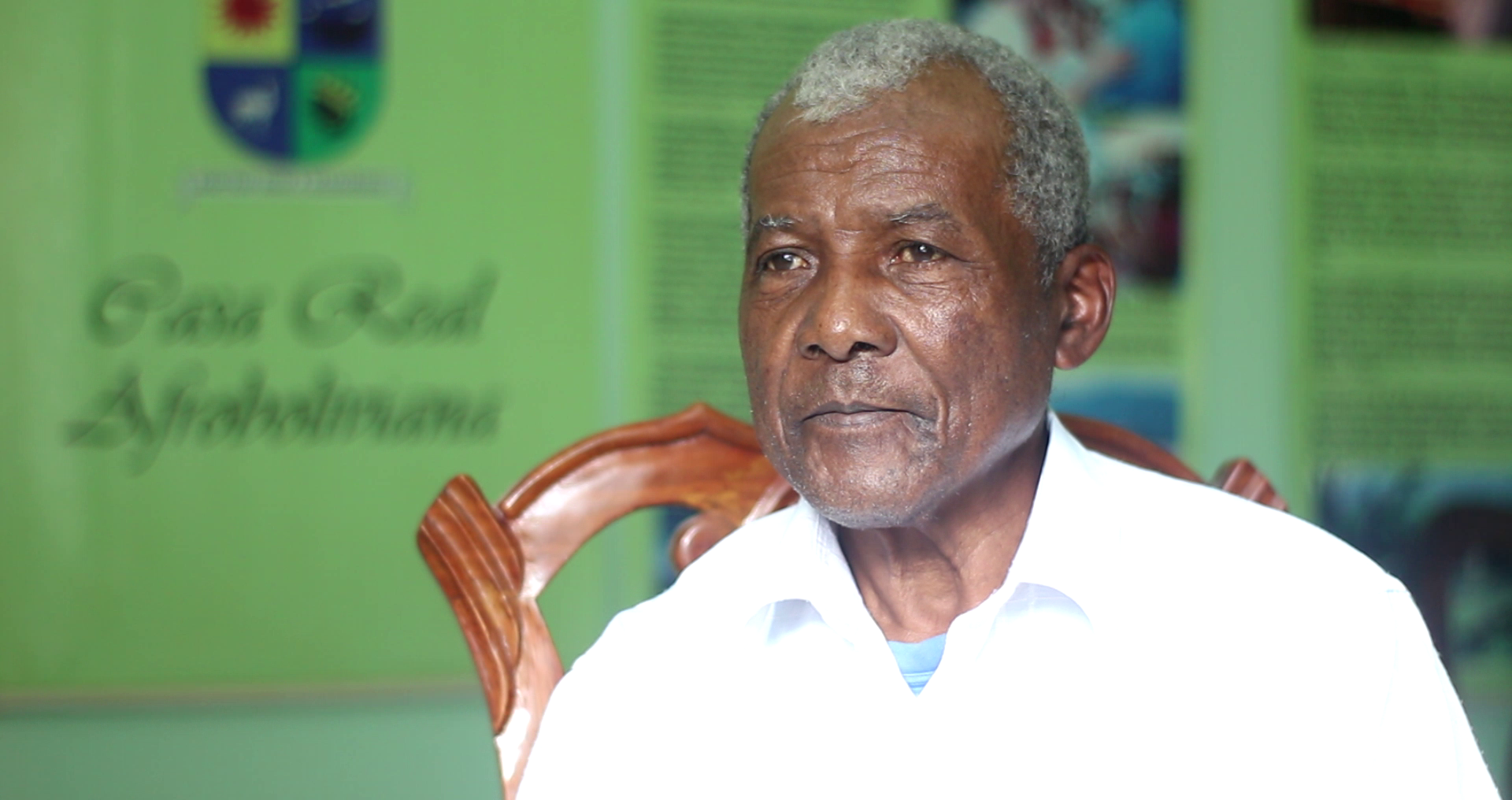
Julio I is the current king of the Afro-Bolivian Royal House.

The Afro-Bolivian Royal House is a ceremonial monarchy officially recognized as part of the Plurinational State in Bolivia. The royal family are the descendants of an African noble line that was brought to Bolivia as slaves. The founding monarch, Uchicho, was allegedly of Congolese (specifically Bakongo) and Senegalese origin, and was brought to the Hacienda of the Marquis de Pinedo, in the area of Los Yungas in what is now La Paz Department. Other slaves allegedly recognized him as a man of regal background (a prince from the ancient Kingdom of Kongo) when seeing his torso exposed with royal tribal marks only held by royalty; he was later crowned in 1823. The monarchy still survives today and the current monarch, King Julio Pinedo, is a direct descendant of Uchicho.

=== Keeping the culture ===
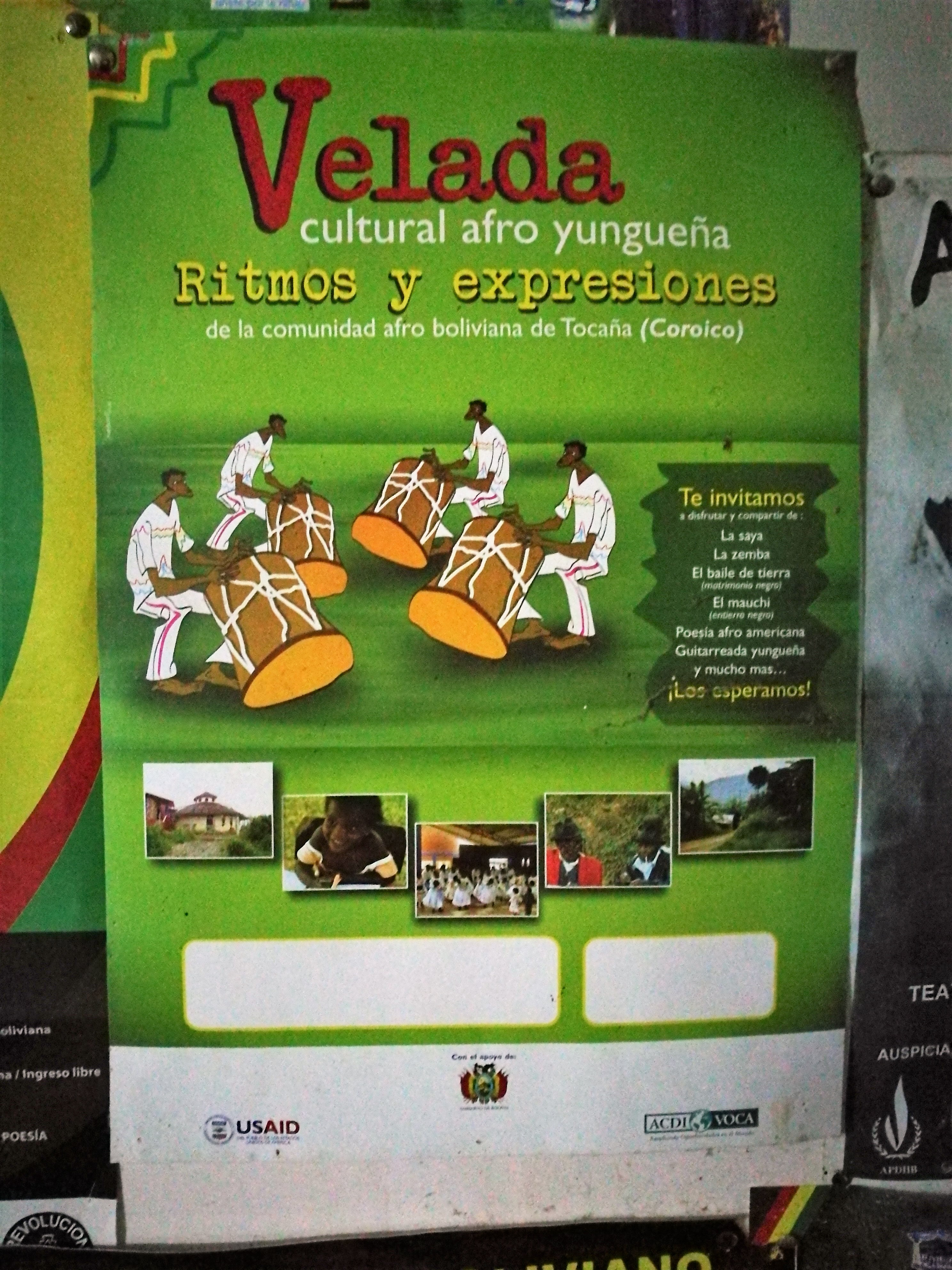
A poster of an Afroyunguera (Afro-Bolivians from Las Yungas) Cultural Program focusing on preserving cultural rhythms and expressions.

Aspects such as feasts, their creole language (that has since decreolized), religion that survived through colonialism have since gone extinct, culturally, although fragments remain. Afro-Bolivians due to isolation from much of Bolivia speak a dialect of Bolivian Spanish, akin to African-American Vernacular English in the United States. Afro-Bolivians, in addition to being Roman Catholic incorporate elements of African diasporic religions such as rituals in the Macumba and Voodoo religions have influence their practice of Christianity, mainly prevalent in the towns of Chicaloma and Mururata. Musical traditions such as dances, instruments, and techniques with ancestral origin in Sub-Saharan Africa, to the present day define Afro-Bolivian identity.

== Afro-Bolivians today ==
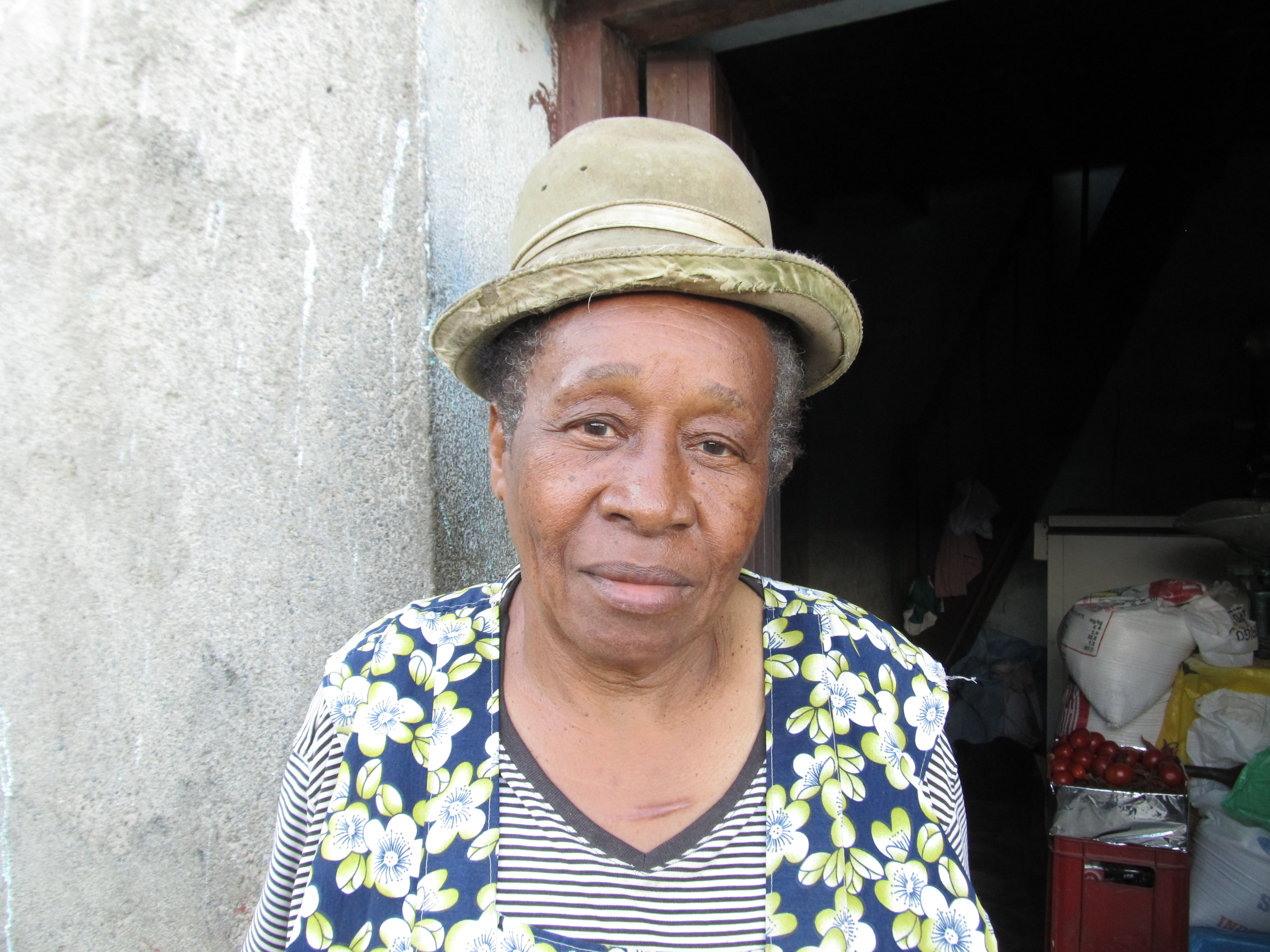
Angélica Larrea, wife of King Julio Pinedo, and Queen of the Afro-Bolivian community in 2012.

They maintain their traditional culture, to the point of maintaining a continuous Afro-Bolivian monarchy currently led by Julio Pinedo at Mururata. Afro-Bolivians spread to the east in Cochabamba and Santa Cruz de la Sierra.

Despite the Afro-Bolivian community fervently working to preserve their culture, many Afro-Bolivians have reported experiencing severe racism and feelings of isolation from society due to intolerance. Laws that actually criminalize racism and discrimination in Afro-Bolivia have slowly been ratified as the first anti-discriminatory law (law 45) was passed in 2010 and was met with violent protesting and rioting. In 2009 President Evo Morales added amendments to the national constitution that outlined the rights of Afro-Bolivians and guaranteed the protection of such liberties. The amendments also generally extended to indigenous peoples and officially recognized Afro-Bolivians as a minority group in Bolivia despite them not being included in the national census three years later. In addition to the country's constitution being updated in 2009, President Morales created the Vice Ministry for Decolonization to create policies that criminalize racism while working to improve literacy and create better race relations in Bolivia. The Vice Ministry for Decolonization also works to dismantle colorism and racism influenced by European colonization while also promoting the philosophy of "intercultural-ity" in which citizens of the nation recognize every ethnic groups' traditions and cultural practices as contributions to society.

=== Black population by department ===
Rank	Province	Percentage	Total population
1	Pando	0.36%	394
2	Beni	0.35%	1,493
3	La Paz	0.33%	8,835
4	Santa Cruz	0.30%	7,845
5	Tarija	0.18%	770
6	Cochabamba	0.14%	2,458
7	Chuquisaca	0.11%	604
8	Oruro	0.10%	490
9	Potosí	0.05%	441
Source: Bolivian census 2012

== Notable Afro-Bolivians ==
=== Politics ===
==== Ceremonial monarchy ====
- Angélica Larrea, current Afro-Bolivian queen
- Aurora Pinedo, former Afro-Bolivian princess regent
- Bonifacio Pinedo, former Afro-Bolivian king
- Julio Pinedo, current Afro-Bolivian king
- Rolando Pinedo Larrea, current Afro-Bolivian crown prince
- Uchicho, first Afro-Bolivian king

==== Government ====
- Ancelma Perlacios, politician and activist who was the first Afro-Bolivian to serve in the Senate.
- Mónica Rey Gutiérrez, supranational delegate to the Plurinational Legislative Assembly of Bolivia
- Jorge Medina, member of the Chamber of Deputies of Bolivia

==== Activism ====
- Marfa Inofuentes, Afro-Bolivian activist

=== Sports ===
==== Basketball ====
- Josh Reaves, professional basketball player for the Dallas Mavericks of the NBA

==== Sports Shooting ====
- Rudolf Knijnenburg, Bolivian Olympic air pistol shooter

==== Soccer ====
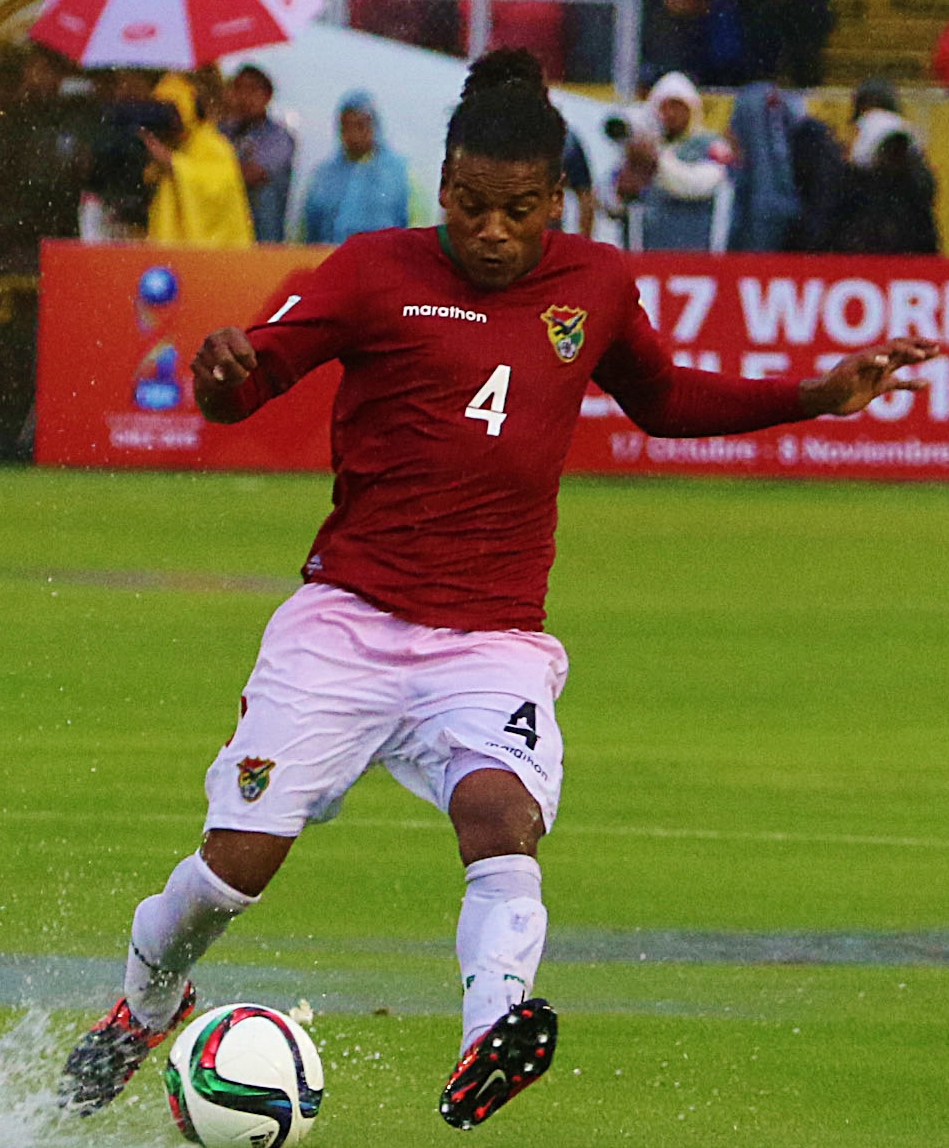
Leonel Morales, football player.

- Edemir Rodríguez, football player, Bolivian international
- Jairo Quinteros, football player, Bolivian international
- Demetrio Angola, football player, Bolivian international
- Leonel Morales, football player, Bolivian international
- Augusto Andaveris, football player, Bolivian international
- Ramiro Castillo, football player, Bolivian international
- Iván Castillo, football player, Bolivian international
- Gustavo Pinedo, football player, Bolivian international
- Jaime Arrascaita, football player, Bolivian international
- Joel Bejarano, football player, Bolivian youth international
- Marc Enoumba, football player, Cameroonian-born, naturalized Bolivian international

== See also ==
- Caporales
- Afro-Bolivian Saya
- Yungas
