= Aurora Pinedo =

Ceremonial Princess-Regent of the Afro-Bolivians

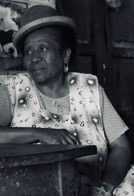

Princess Regent of the Afro-Bolivians
- Reign: 30 January 1954 – April 18, 1992
- Predecessor: Bonifacio I (as king)
- Successor: Julio I (as king)
- Born: 1910; Mururata, La Paz, Bolivia
- Died: 18 April 1992 (aged 81–82); Mururata, La Paz, Bolivia
- Spouse: Genaro
- Issue: Julio I Prince Justino; Prince Hermengildo; Prince Gabriel
- House: Pinedo
- Father: Bonifacio I
- Mother: Cecilia Barra

Doña Aurora Pinedo y Barra (1910 – 18 April 1992) was the Princess Regent of the Afro-Bolivians from 1954 to 1992. As her father, Bonifacio I, had no male heirs, she succeeded him as princess regent following his death in 1954.

== Biography ==
Doña Aurora Pinedo was born in 1910 in Mururata to Don Bonifacio Pinedo and his second wife, Doña Cecilia Barra. She was a princess of the Afro-Bolivian Royal House as the eldest daughter of Bonifacio, who reigned as ceremonial King of the Afro-Bolivians.

Following the death of her father in 1954, who had no direct male heirs, she assumed the role of Princess Regent of the Afro-Bolivians, taking on the responsibilities of the ceremonial monarch. She reigned as regent for thirty-eight years while the throne of the royal house was vacant.

She married Genaro and had four sons: Prince Julio, Prince Justino, Prince Hermenegildo, and Prince Gabriel. Her husband predeceased her.

Pinedo died on 18 April 1992 in Mururata. She was succeeded by her eldest son, Prince Julio, as king.
