= Ekisaakaate =

Cultural development program in Buganda

Ekisaakaate, also called Ekisaakaate kya Nnabagereka or Ekisaakaate kya mama Nnabagereka, is a cultural development program in the Buganda Kingdom, Uganda, for children and youth. It was started by Sylvia Naginda Luswata, her Royal Highness, the Nnaabagereka of Buganda. The program aims to nurture children/youth in respect for traditional Buganda culture, heritage, and traditional values, while providing practical skills in craftsmanship, etiquette, and other life skills.

== History ==
Ekisaakaate is a Luganda word for a royal enclosure, or cultural retreat/camp organized for children and youth to learn about the Buganda culture, innovations and improve their talents. These included apprenticeship with skilled professionals in areas such as pottery, blacksmithing, hunting, and other crafts.

Abasaakaate is a Luganda word, meaning "youth participating in the ekisaakaate".

After Buganda lost sovereignty to British colonialists in the late 1880s, many traditional cultural practices began to decline. The modern Ekisaakaate program, launched in 2007 by the Nnaabagereka of Buganda, sought to revive these traditions and pass them on to younger generations, especially in contexts where parents may not have the time or knowledge to teach cultural values.

Ekisaakaate started in pre-colonial and colonial Buganda, where men were nurtured in traditional cultural schools called ekisaakaate. Ekisaakaate was a place enclosed with papyrus reeds, and were managed by chiefs of the Buganda kabaka. The men in ekisaakaate were taught leadership, cultural practices, values and other skills aimed at sustaining the kingdom lifespan.

When kingdoms were abolished in Uganda in 1966, the ekisaakaate program disappeared. In 2006, after the restoration of Buganda kingdom in 1993, Sylvia Naginda Luswata, Nnabagereka of Buganda restored the ekisaakaate program targeting boys and girls between 6–18 years. The ekisaakaate camps run during the January school holidays for two weeks.

== Objectives ==
The ekisaakaate helps in equipping the children and youth with knowledge about the Buganda culture, life skills.

== Program and curriculum ==
Ekisaakaate takes place twice annually:

1. The January session aligns with the Uganda National Examinations Board school calendar particularly targeting the children in schools using the UNEB calendar.
2. The July session targets diaspora and international students.

Key activities participants take part in are a blend of tradition and modernity;

- Traditional etiquette, such as kneeling while greeting
- Crafts: Basket weaving, bark cloth making, pottery, preparing local(traditional) dishes like oluwombo
- Traditional games such as Omweso
- Cultural performances, including dance and music
- Modern skills like karate, introduced to promote self-defense and physical activity

The ekisaakaate curriculum includes Buganda cultural etiquette, discipline, patriotism, life skills, mental health awareness and career guidance.

Ekisaakaate curriculum activities
Program	Activities
Cultural preservation	Buganda traditions; Customs; etiquette; respecting elders and authority; Luganda use and cultural identification
Life Skills	Hygiene and personal care; Communication and public speaking; Conflict resolution and teamwork; Handcrafts; Agriculture
Wellbeing	Music, dance and drama in regards to Buganda culture Sports and fitness Creatives Mental health awareness
Education	Buganda history Civic education and social responsibility

Ekisaakaate timetable
Morning	Afternoon	Evening
Prayer; Physical Exercise; Talks by resource persons; Debates	Sports mainly volleyball, swimming or indoor board games; Talks by resource persons; Handcrafts such as weaving, knitting, bead/craft making	Entertainment; Prayer; Bed time stories involving also sex education with Ssenga/ Jajja sessions

== Editions ==
The 2026 edition of the ekisaakaate which is also the 19th edition was held from January 3 to 10, 2026 at Hormisdallen School Gayaza, Wakiso district under the theme Roots of resilience embracing obuntu bulamu for mental wellness. The 19th ekisaakaate edition was launched in August 2025 at Bulange, Mengo. The ekisaakaate was attended by 250 abasaakaate. Charles Peter Mayiga and Sylvia Nagginda closed the 19th ekisaakaate on 10 January 2026. The ekisaakaate was supposed to run from 3 January to 17 January 2026 but it was shortened due to the national elections happening on 15 January 2026.

The 2025 edition of the ekisaakaate was held under the integrating culture with technology at St.Janan School in January 2025 while the launch ceremony was at Bulange Gardens in Mengo. During the launch ceremony which was attended by Sylvia Mulinge, CEO for MTN Uganda. MTN Momo pledged and donated 55 million to support the event. The 2025 edition of the ekisaakaate launch ceremony was graced by Nnabagereka Sylivia Nagginda.

The 2024 ekisaakaate edition hosted by Hormisdallen Primary School Gayaza under the theme In Pursuit of Obuntubulamu. Finance Trust Bank was part of the sponsoring team and they also trained abasaakaate on financial education including topics like personal budget management, savings, smart investments. Sylvia Nagginda and Peter Charles Mayiga delivered the closing remark of the 2024 ekisaakaate edition.

In January 2017, the 11th Ekisaakaate edition was held at St Janan Secondary School in Luweero District for two weeks. The ekisaakaate was attended by over 500 children and Sylvia Nagginda implored the children to appreciate civility and they become ambassadors of hard work and disciplines in their communities of residence.

== Governance ==
Ekisaakaate kya Nnabagereka is overseen by Nnabagereka development foundation, a charitable organization registered in Uganda and also in the USA founded by Sylvia Nagginda in 2000, she also serves as the chairperson board of trustees. The foundation is led by the board of directors and board of trustees. The Ekisaakaate kya Nnabagereka has a team led by the foundation manager and program manager who are responsible for the palnninh, developing and running the training camps.

== Gender Equality ==
Ekisaakate kya Nnabagereka works towards promoting an inclusive training for all children, promoting gender equality. Initially some activities were gender-specific such as girls learning basket weaving and baking, boys focusing on bark cloth, hunting tools, and musical instruments.

== Benefits and Challenges ==
Benefits:

- Instills cultural values, skills, and leadership.
- Encourages home practice for lasting impact.
- Fosters social bonds and self-reliance.

Challenges:

- Wealthier kids may not internalize skills, relying on staff at home such as household maids.
- Balancing traditions with modern additions like karate.
- Relies on involvement of the parents to properly follow-up to ensure children apply and develop the skills they acquire.
