= Uganda in World War II =

- Part of World War II
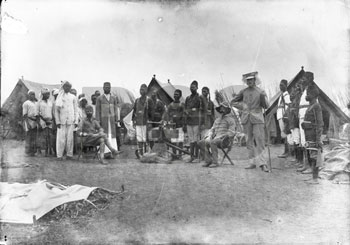
- Soldiers from the King's African Rifles in East Africa, 1943.
Date	3 September 1939 – 2 September 1945
Location	Protectorate of Uganda (then a British protectorate); operations in East Africa, Madagascar, Burma and other theatres
Result	Contribution of personnel and resources to the Allied war effort
Territorial changes	No major changes

Belligerents
British Empire; Allies	Axis powers

Commanders and leaders
British colonial authorities	—

Units involved
King's African Rifles (Ugandan battalions and other colonial units)	—

Strength
≈77,000 (Ugandan personnel serving in colonial units; estimate)	—

Casualties and losses
Several thousand (exact figure not established)	—
- Uganda was a British protectorate during the war; most Ugandan personnel served within British colonial formations rather than as an independent national army.

The British colonial territory of the Protectorate of Uganda in East Africa was ipso facto involved in the Second World War from 1939–1945 when Britain declared war on the Germany in September 1939. The colony contributed manpower, agricultural resources, and raw materials to the Allied forces, and served as a key regional hub for military operations in East Africa and the Middle East against the Axis powers. Civilian farmers were requisitioned to intensify the production of cash crops, while local leaders spearheaded war savings community donations to support the Allies.

== Historical context before World War II ==
=== Pre-colonial Uganda ===
Before the colonial period, the societies located in the region corresponding to today's Uganda had a diversity of political organizations. North of the Nile, the communities were mostly structured in clans, while the south and southwest saw the development of centralized kingdoms. The most influential of these kingdoms was the Bunyoro-Kitara, founded at the end of the 15th century, which exercised its authority over a large part of the region for several centuries. Smaller kingdoms gradually appeared around him, including that of Buganda. At the end of the 18th century, the decline of Bunyoro-Kitara allowed the rise of the kingdom of Buganda, whose political structure and leadership favored a new territorial expansion. During the period of Buganda's rise, the first Swahili traders from the East African coast reached the region to trade in ivory and enslaved people.

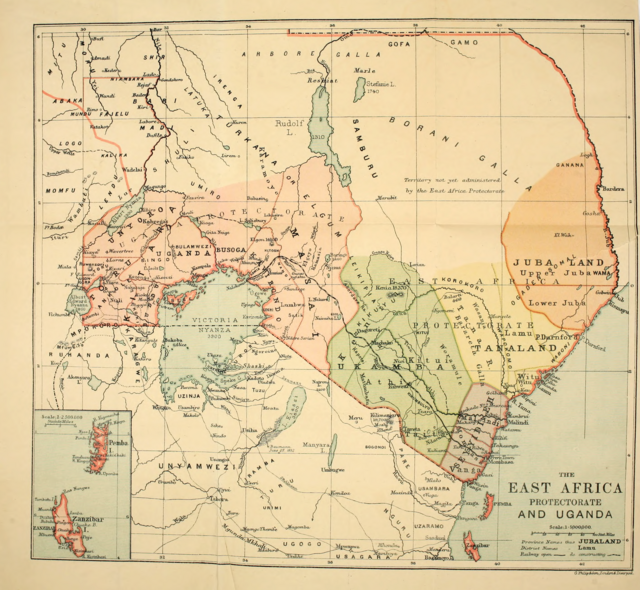
A map of the Protectorate of Uganda in 1898

=== First contact with Europeans ===
Around 1856 Kabaka Mutesa I became ruler of the Buganda Kingdom. In 1862, he allowed the British explorer John Hanning Speke to visit his territory, marking the first documented contact between a European and the Buganda Kingdom. In 1875, explorer Henry Morton Stanley also met Kabaka Mutesa I. Although Buganda remained largely unaffected at that time, the northern areas experienced raids by Egyptian and Sudanese slave traders. Seeking allies, Mutesa invited Christian missionaries. The Church Missionary Society arrived in 1877, followed by the White Fathers in 1879, whose presence soon influence several chiefs among the kingdom.

His successor, Mwanga II of Buganda, who became kabaka in 1884, failed to limit their influence and was deposed in 1888. Restored to the throne with Christian support, Mwanga II soon faced European imperial ambitions. In 1889, he signed a protection treaty with German adventurer Carl Peters, but it was annulled after the 1890 Anglo-German Agreement, which placed the region within the British sphere of influence. That same year, Captain F. D. Lugard, representing the Imperial British East Africa Company, signed a new treaty bringing Buganda under British protection and extended similar agreements to Ankole and Tooro. When the company lacked funds, the British government established the Protectorate of Buganda in 1894.

=== Protectorate of Uganda ===
Britain inherited a land divided by political and religious factions and threatened by Kabalega of Bunyoro. By 1896, the protectorate encompassed Bunyoro, Toro, Ankole, and Busoga. In 1897, Mwanga attempted to resist British authority but was ultimately deposed, leading to his young son's installation as ruler under British supervision. The same year, a mutiny by Sudanese troops employed by the colonial administration prompted Britain to take firmer control of the Uganda Protectorate. In 1899, Sir Harry Johnston was dispatched to assess the situation and propose an administrative framework. His mission resulted in the Buganda Agreement of 1900, which defined relations between the British Crown and the Buganda Kingdom for over fifty years. The kabaka was recognized as ruler of Buganda on the condition of loyalty to the colonial authority, and the lukiko gained official status. The leading chiefs benefited most, acquiring both greater power and freehold land to secure their allegiance. Similar treaties were later concluded with the rulers of Toro (1900) and Ankole (1901).

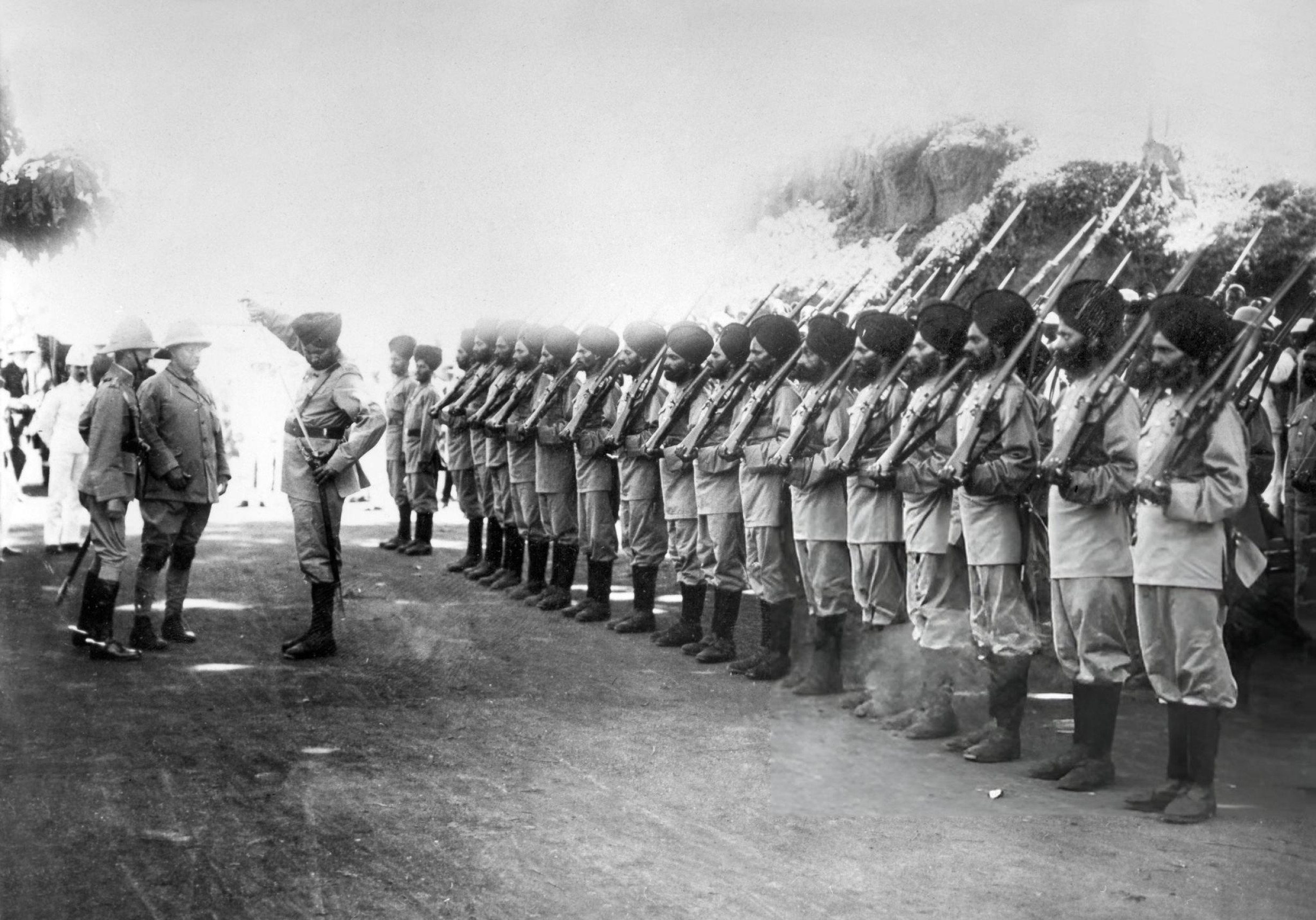
Photograph of President Theodore Roosevelt being greeted by an Indian Sikh Honour Guard, Entebbe, Uganda Protectorate, 1909

In the early 20th century, James Hayes Sadler, serving as commissioner, considered Uganda unsuitable for large-scale European settlement. His successor, Sir Hesketh Bell, promoted a different vision. Developing the country through its African population rather than foreign settlers. This approach faced resistance, especially from Chief Justice William Morris Carter, who led a land commission advocating for European plantation farming. Bell instead encouraged Ugandan farmers to grow cotton, introduced in 1904, which became the backbone of the protectorate's economy. The resulting prosperity allowed Uganda to achieve financial independence from British subsidies by 1914.

=== World War I and interwar period ===
During the Great War, minor clashes occurred along Uganda's southwestern border, but the protectorate itself was never threatened. After the war, colonial authorities promoted agricultural diversification, including cotton and coffee, while the Great Depression and the ban on freehold land limited European projects. Growing production required expanding transport infrastructure, with railways connecting Jinja to Namasagali, Mombasa to Soroti, and Kampala to the coast by 1931. Uganda recovered and grew economically by the end of the 1930s.

== Wartime period ==
When Britain entered the Second World War in 1939, Uganda automatically joined the conflict as part of the British Empire and was reorganized into a key administrative centre supporting Allied strategy in East Africa. The protectorate headquarters expanded wartime supervision and coordination, including the monitoring of political associations, wartime committees, and district-level decision-making. The wartime planning drew heavily on Buganda's administrative machinery, with chiefs instructed to carry out mobilization, information control, and enforcement of emergency directives from late 1939 onward. As wartime demands grew, the colonial government extended its authority into transport, local administration, and political oversight. Local chiefs were increasingly required to carry out these wartime regulations, which altered routine administrative responsibilities and broadened the scope of colonial governance.

Wartime regulations also affected everyday conditions through administrative controls, supply shortages, and changes in local political activity. Imported goods such as cloth, soap, and bicycle tyres became difficult to obtain by 1943–1945, contributing to public dissatisfaction among both rural producers and urban residents. These shortages contributed to rising local grievances that colonial officials were required to address through additional wartime directives. Public meetings, vernacular newspapers, and wartime fundraising activities became important channels for discussion of war-related policies, criticism of chiefs, and the circulation of political information. Patterns of public expression and political engagement developed during the war were influenced by administrative pressures and material constraints.

=== Military role ===
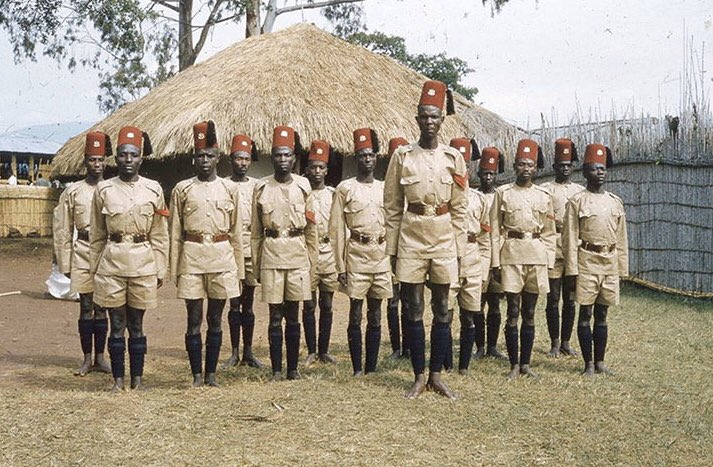
King's African Rifles (KAR)-Uganda

Uganda played a supportive but strategically significant role in the Allies war effort by helping expel Italian forces from East Africa and by guarding British supply routes. Ugandan recruits were initially placed into a single King's African Rifles battalion, receiving training at bases in Jinja and Bombo. Many Ugandans served as infantrymen, drivers, engineers, and porters, forming part of the allied campaigns in the East African and Burma theatres. They served in campaigns in Ethiopia, Eritrea, Madagascar and Somaliland during the East African campaign. They also participated with other East African soldiers in campaigns against Italian forces in Ethiopia and Japanese troops in Burma. Their service was critical to Allied campaigns in these regions, particularly during the East African campaign and the Burma campaign.

=== Economic role ===
Uganda's economy was modified to maintain the war effort under British Colonial Protectorate. The country's main wealth were cotton and coffee which were requisitioned and exported to supply allied industries such as textiles in Britain and India. Exported foods such as maize, cassava, and beans were also collected to sustain allied troops in East Africa and the Middle East. The colonial government diverted part of Uganda's export earnings into a "Cotton and Coffee Fund", amassing over £3 million by 1945 as a forced saving scheme to finance Britain's war needs and stabilize the imperial economy. These controls, together with fixed producer prices for cotton and coffee, meant that Ugandan farmers effectively subsidized Britain's war effort by selling at below-market rates.

Kampala and Entebbe became major logistical and administrative centers for supporting British operations throughout Africa. Entebbe's port on Lake Victoria and its airfield were expanded to facilitate the movement of supplies and troops. The main economic challenge was to develop transport infrastructure, such as roads and rail to connect Uganda more efficiently to the East African rail and port system, enabling faster transport of goods to the ports of Mombasa and Dar es Salaam.

Wartime mobilization deepened rural inequalities, as chiefs and large producers gained privileged access to markets and labour while smallholders faced shortages and declining purchasing power. Although Uganda emerged as a wartime creditor to Britain, the population saw little benefit from their contributions, leading to growing frustration that erupted in the 1945 strikes and later colonial economic policy.

== Post-war social and political impact ==
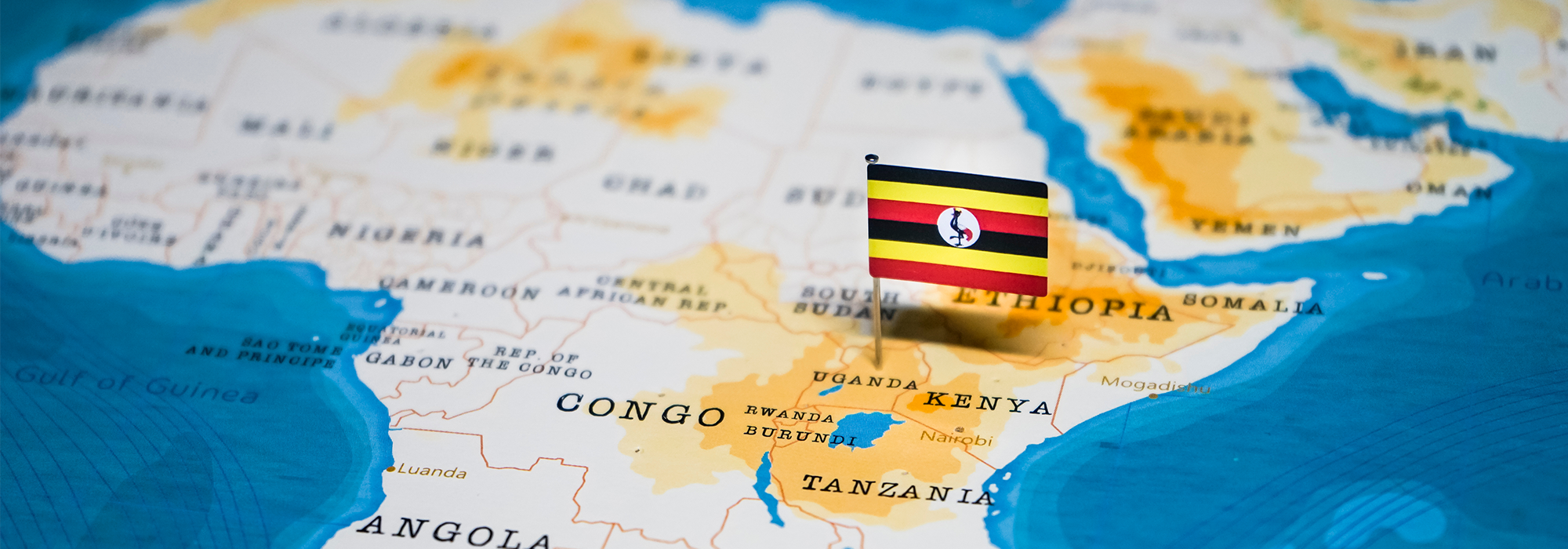
Uganda under Colonial Rule, in Government Reports, 1903–1961

The wartime mobilization of Uganda war brought major changes to Uganda's economy and society, accelerating urbanization and introducing new forms of political awareness among local populations. These transformations contributed to the rise of nationalist movements leading toward Uganda's independence in 1962. Increased economic inequality and frustration erupted in the 1945 strikes and riots that marked the beginning of Uganda's postwar nationalism. At the end of World War II, many Ugandan soldiers expected recognition and new opportunities for their wartime service, while British officials grew uneasy about the empire's reliance on Africans as allies rather than mere subjects. This shift contributed to emerging political tensions in postwar Uganda, especially in Buganda.

The war accelerated social change as education expanded, urbanization increased, and returning veterans brought new political ideas. The Kabaka, Mutesa II, cooperated with British authorities but also began asserting Buganda's growing autonomy. One of the major political and traditional turning points was the “Nnamasole crisis." In 1941, in Buganda, the first lady, known as “Queen Mother Irene Namaganda,” found herself at the center of controversy following the announcement of her pregnancy by a very young man, Mutesa II of Buganda. Although initially accepted by the British Empire authorities, this union was perceived as a violation of royal norms. This led to the exile of the Queen Mother and the fall of the Prime Minister Martin Luther Nsibirwa, leaving behind political chaos. Religious and ethnical rivalries caused by colonization contributed to the creation of political parties such as the DP (Catholic party), the UPC (anti-Protestant Baganda) and the KY (viming the predominance of the Buganda).

=== Emergence of a military elites ===
During and after the second world war, the expansion of Uganda's colonial army created opportunities for Africans to enter military service. Among those who joined during this period was Idi Amin, who enlisted in the King's African Rifles in 1946, at a time when Britain was reinforcing its military presence in East Africa. Idi amin later participated in post-war operations in Kenya and Somalia, where he was exposed to contemporary military structures and training practices that were not widely available to Ugandans military elites under colonial rule.

Several historians note that the growth of the colonial military and the increased access to training following the war contributed to the development of a new group African military personnel. According to this scholarship, these developments formed part of the broader context in which military figures such as Amin dada emerged and later played significant roles in Ugandan's post-independence politics.

== Remembrance of World War II ==
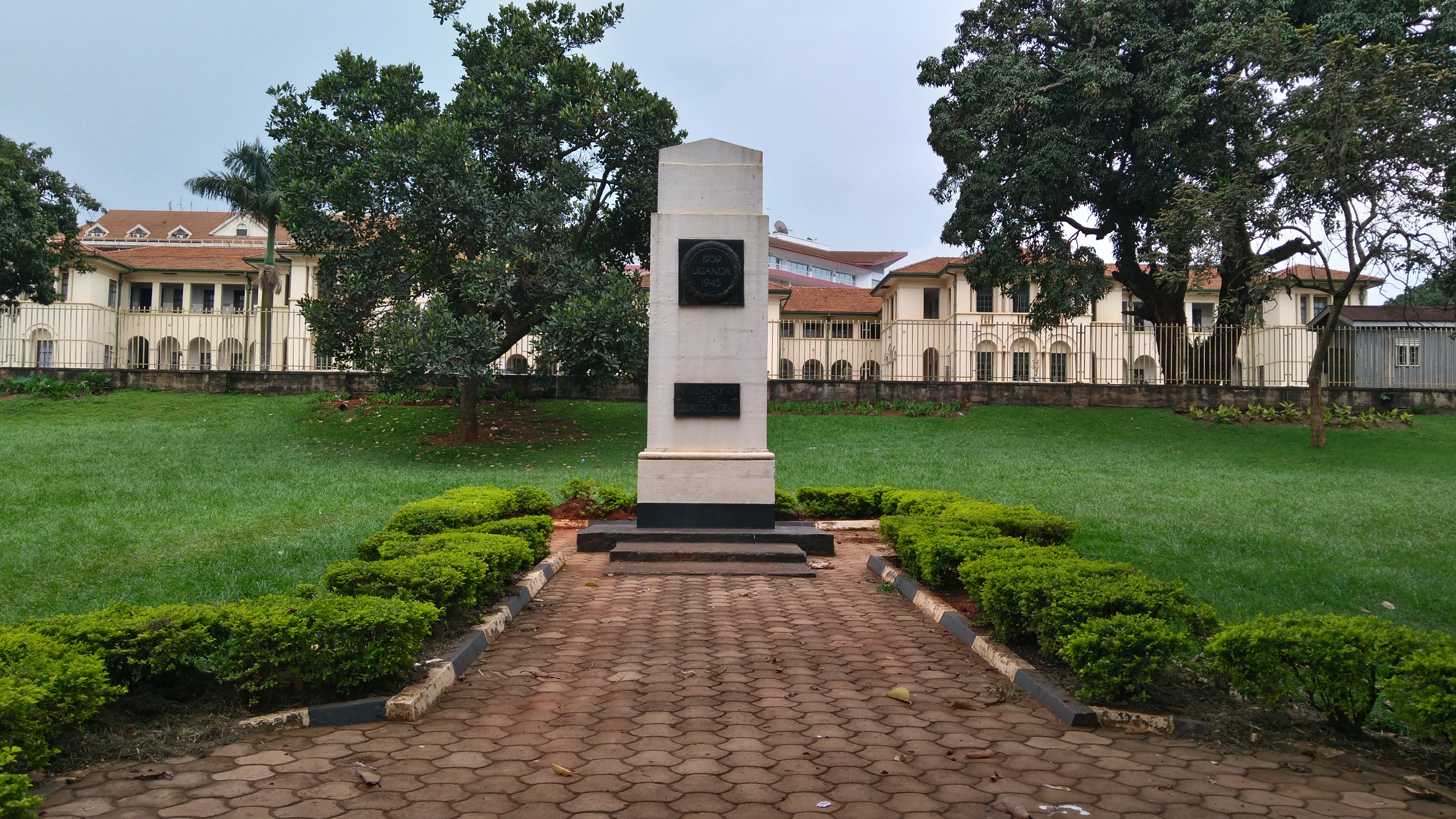
World War Memorial Monument, Kampala – Uganda

After the end of World War II, Ugandan memory remained discreet for a long time due to its status as a British protectorate (1894–1962). The Ugandan veterans of the King's African Rifles were largely forgotten in the official commemorations of the United Kingdom, despite their significant participation in the East African campaigns. There are memorials such as the World War Memorial Monument located at Kampala in Uganda.

In Kampala, the War Memorial Clock Tower, built in the 1954, honors Ugandan and East African soldiers who died for the British Empire during World War II. Uganda holds an annual Remembrance Day, celebrated in November. It was originally created to commemorate the end of the World War I on November 11, 1918, when the Armistice was signed. Since 1945 it has honored the memory of all Commonwealth soldiers who died in combat during both World Wars and in subsequent conflicts. It remains one of the few occasions when the participation of African troops is publicly recognized. These ceremonies are generally organized under the supervision of the Commonwealth War Graves Commission (CWGC), in collaboration with the Ugandan government and Commonwealth embassies.

This memory remains largely institutional and centered on the colonial narrative. Local initiatives to preserve veterans’ testimonies are rare, although universities such as Makerere University in Kampala have launched oral history projects since the 2000s. These programs aim to document the experiences of Ugandan soldiers, often left anonymous in British archives.

== See also ==
- Kenya in World War II
- Italian East Africa
- Madagascar in World War II
- Egypt in World War II
- North African campaign
- Western Desert campaign
- Syria–Lebanon campaign
- French West Africa in World War II
- Battle of Madagascar
- Colonial troops
- History of Buganda
- Politics of Uganda
- East African campaign (World War I)
- Military history of Uganda
- World War II in Yugoslav Macedonia
