= Naggalabi Buddo =

Naggalabi Hill (at times written as Nagalabi) is a cultural, religious and heritage site where the kings of Buganda Kingdom are crowned.

It is also believed to be the place where the first king of Buganda Kingdom won the battle for the crown after a fight with his brother, Prince Bemba. He declared that all successive kings of Buganda would be crowned at that place.

== Location ==
The Naggalabi Coronation Site is located on Budo Hill, Wakiso District in Busiro County. The site can be accessed from the Kampala -Masaka Highway Site, Southwest of Kampala District and about 14 kilometers from the city centre.It can also be accessed from Kajjansi Town Council which is along Entebbe Road. There are a number of educational institutions in its vicinity such as Kings College Buddo where one of the Kings of Buganda, Daudi Chwa II studied.

== History ==
According to author Neil Kodesh, the name Naggalabi consists of the luganda verb okuggala, ‘‘to shut out,’’ and the adjectival "bi" denoting evil or danger thus yielding ‘‘the place where evil and danger are shut out.’

It is believed that the Naggalabi Coronation Site has been in existence since the 14th Century. According to the website buganda.com, Kintu's brother Bemba lived in a house called Buganda which was located at Naggalabi Buddo. After defeating Bemba in battle, Kintu slept in Bemba's house as a sign of victory thus becoming the "ruler" of Bemba's house. Eventually, the name came to denote all the territory that Kintu ruled over. In commemoration of Kintu's victory over Bemba, new kings of Buganda are therefore crowned at Naggalabi.

Kings of Buganda are subjected to a number of rituals at the site before they can be crowned. As of 2020, at least six kings of Buganda have been crowned there, from Kabaka Daudi Chwa II in 1897 to the reigning Kabaka Muwenda Mutebi II, crowned in 1993.

== Landmarks ==
There are a number of landmarks at the coronation site, with the most significant being Nakibuuka forest (locally referred to as akabira Nakibuuka) where the last and most important coronation rituals are performed.

There is also Buganda house (locally known as akayumba Buganda) in addition to Mboneredde, a tree under which is said to have been a traditional court.

== See also ==
- Buganda Kingdom
- Kasubi Tombs
- Kabaka of Buganda
