= Florence Nkalubo =

Ugandan educator, politicians and sports activist

Owek. Florence Bagunywa Nkalubo
- Born: Uganda
- Occupations: Educator, Politician, Sports Advocate
- Years active: 1990s–present
- Organizations: FUFA, UWFA, Buganda Kingdom, Kampala International University
- Known for: Promoting women's and youth sports in Uganda
- Notable work: Nkalubo End of Year Cup, Kampala Girls' Primary Football Initiative
- Title: Former Minister of Youth and Employment (Buganda Kingdom)
- Political party: Democratic Party (Uganda)
- Children: 3
- Father: Arthur Bagunywa Nkalubo Kateregga

Florence Nkalubo also known as Owek Florence Bagunywa Nkalubo is a Ugandan educator, politician and sports advocate. She is known for her efforts in championing sports among women and youth in Uganda.

== Personal life ==
She is a mother of three children. Florence's father was Arthur Bagunywa Nkalubo Kateregga who was the former minister for Buganda Kingdom. The father died at the age of 91 according to his family members at Platinum Hospital.

== Work history ==
She served as the Minister of youth and employment in the Buganda Kingdom for 10 years. She is also a women's champion for football which has encouraged more girls to consider sports as a career in Uganda. She served as the Vice President of the Federation of Uganda Football Associations (FUFA) and was representing women for a while as one of the two women delegates. However, she joined FUFA as the treasurer. As the FUFA delegate, she ushered many programmes to be funded by FIFA such as Kampala District Girls' Primary School football which was started with 60 schools and later expanded. She started getting involved in sports when she was still a young girl where she would be play as the high jump, table tennis, lawn tennis, and hockery. When she was at Nkozi Teachers' College, she was trained in discus, short put and long-distance runner. She also won several trophies. Nkalubo contested for Local Council 5 as the woman councilor for Rubaga North in 1997 when the LCs had just come in place and won and it was during her time of the service that she started a tournament named Nkalubo End of Year Cup. She also served as the UWFA president. She was an aspirant for Lubaga North Member of Parliament under the Democratic Party. She was the Lubaga North's city secretary for education. She served as the Kampala International University Council.

== See also ==
- Federation of Uganda Football Associations
- Cotilda Nakate Kikomeko
- Prosperous Nankindu Kavuma
- International Federation of Association Football
