= Fred Masagazi Masaazi =

Prof. Fred Masagazi Masaazi
- Born: Uganda
- Occupations: Educator, administrator, researcher
- Employer(s): Buganda Kingdom, Makerere University
- Organizations: Buganda Kingdom; Mpigi District, Uganda National Examinations Board; National Curriculum Development Centre; Makerere University
- Known for: Director of the Makerere Institute of Teacher Education Research (MITER); Chairperson of the Mak-RIF Grant Management Committee; * Principal of the College of Education and External Studies (CEES) from 2013 to 2022
- Title: Prof.
- Predecessor: J.C.S. Musaazi

Fred Masagazi Masaazi also known as Prof. Fred Masagazi Masaazi is a Ugandan academic, educationist, researcher, and administrator.

== Early life and educational background ==
He began his education at St. Aloysius Primary School in Mitala Maria, Mpigi District. He then completed his O-Level studies at Kampala Tutorial College and advanced to A-Level at Kampala High School.

Masagazi Masaazi later joined Makerere University, where he earned a Bachelor of Arts (linguistics, English and Luganda). He also obtained a Postgraduate Diploma in Education, a Master of Arts in Luganda, and a PhD in Language Education (Luganda).

== Career ==
=== Academic career ===
Masagazi Masaazi began his career at Makerere University as a lecturer in the Department of Humanities and Language Education and later served as the head of epartment of Language Education from 2002 to 2010. He was the dean of the School of Education from 2010 to 2012.

He served at the Uganda National Examinations Board (UNEB) as a chief examiner, examination setter, and moderator. He also worked with the National Curriculum Development Centre (NCDC) as a consultant on the mother tongue syllabus and as a member of the subject panel.

Masagazi Masaazi was appointed as a principal of the College of Education and External Studies (CEES) from 2013 to 2022. He is also a director of the Makerere Institute of Teacher Education Research (MITER) and chairperson of the Mak-RIF Grant Management Committee.

=== Buganda kingdom service ===
Within the Buganda Kingdom, Masagazi Masaazi served as the Commissioner of Education and later Chairperson of the Buganda Education Commission. He also served as State Minister of Education and later he became Minister of Education and Sports in the Buganda Kingdom government from 2000 to 2010.

== Academic publications and journal articles ==
Masagazi Masaazi has contributed to African language education and publishing, with focus on the development of the Luganda language. His scholarly work includes Accelerating African Languages Development through Strategic Improvement of the Publishing Landscape: Lessons from Luganda Language Realities (2025).

He has also authored Luganda literary and instructional texts such as "Balya n'Enseekeezi", "Erinnya N'Embu Zaalyo", and "Mpaawo kitakya". These publications are used as reading materials in Ugandan secondary schools and are referenced in setting examinations for both Ordinary and Advanced Level Luganda language courses.

Masagazi Masaazi journal articles includes "Developing a Friendly and Productive Language Learning Environment" (2015), "On Uganda Government's Commitment to Mother Tongue Education Policy" (2018), "Implementation of Competence-Based Curriculum and African Languages Teaching" (2024) and "Harnessing WhatsApp for Continuous Professional Development" (2025).

== See also ==
- Senteza Kajubi
- Cotilda Nakate Kikomeko
- Makerere University
- Buganda Kingdom
