= Charles Mayiga =

Ugandan lawyer and author

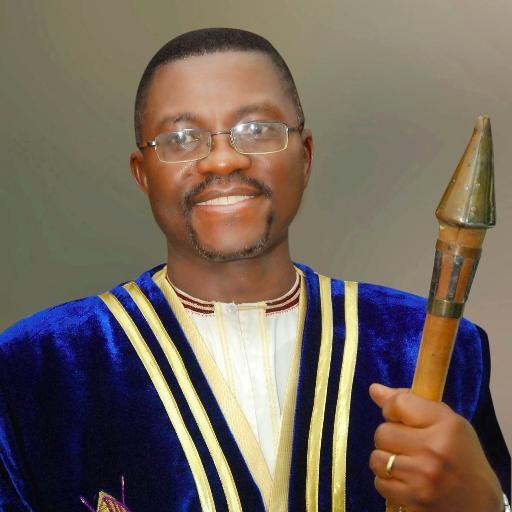
- Mayiga holding Ddamula

Katikkiro of Buganda
- Incumbent
- Assumed office 2013
- Monarch: Muwenda Mutebi II
- Preceded by: John Baptist Walusimbi

Personal details
- Born: 1962 (age 63–64) Kasanje, Uganda
- Citizenship: Uganda
- Spouse: Margaret Mayiga
- Education: Makerere University (Bachelor of Laws); Law Development Centre (Diploma in Legal Practice)
- Occupation: Lawyer
- Known for: Cultural Matters

Charles Peter Mayiga (born 1962) is a Ugandan lawyer, cultural leader, author and businessman. He is the current Katikkiro (prime minister) of Buganda kingdom, a constitutional monarchy in Uganda. He was appointed to that position in May 2013 by the reigning Kabaka of Buganda, Muwenda Mutebi II of Buganda, replacing John Baptist Walusimbi.

== Biography ==
Charles Peter Mayiga was born in Kasanje village, Kabonera Parish, Masaka District, Central Uganda. (now Masaka city) His parents are Ssaalongo Cyprian Mukasa and Nnaalongo Rebecca Kyese Mukasa. He is a muganda by tribe who belongs to Omutima omuyanja clan. He attended Butale Primary School and Nkoni Primary School. For his O-Level education, he attended St. Henry's College Kitovu. Later, he studied at St. Mary's College Kisubi for his A-Levels. He holds the degree of Bachelor of Laws (LLB), from Makerere University, Uganda's oldest and largest public university. He also holds a Diploma in Legal Practice, obtained from the Law Development Center, in Kampala Uganda's capital city.

== Career ==
Starting in 1987, Mayiga has been working closely with the elders of the Kingdom of Buganda, sharpening his knowledge and understanding of the customs and traditions of Buganda.

On 4 July 1991, while preparing for the restoration of the Kingdom of Buganda, Mayiga was appointed to become the Secretary of the Council of Elders, responsible for organizing the cultural restoration. This title changed to Secretary to the Lukiiko (Parliament of Buganda), following the restoration of the Monarchy. When the Kingdom was restored in 1993, Mayiga was appointed Buganda's Minister of Information & Official Spokesman for the Kingdom. He served in that capacity until he was appointed Katikkiro of Buganda in May 2013.

Prior to his appointment as Katikkiro, Mayiga had turned down at least two opportunities to run for elective public office in the Central Ugandan government.

== Personal life ==
Mayiga is a law partner in the company Buwule and Mayiga Company Advocates, based in Kampala, Uganda's capital and largest city. He has been married to Margaret Mayiga, an alumnus of Trinity College Nabbingo, since 1987. He is the author of a book titled King on the Throne, which chronicles the first 16 years (1993–2009) of the reign of His Majesty Muwenda Mutebi II of Buganda. Mayiga has also authored Buganda ku Ntikko, a book in Luganda that states the five key kingdom aspirations. This book was published on 29 May 2013, the very day he was handed the instruments of power. In 2017, Mayiga released his third book, titled Uganda:7-Key Transformation Idea, which details seven ideas that can help third World countries develop.

== See also ==
- Mengo
- Bulange
- Kabaka of Buganda
- Buganda Kingdom
- Nnabagereka of Buganda

== Succession table ==
Preceded by Engineer John Baptist Walusimbi as Katikkiro of Buganda	Charles Peter Mayiga as Katikkiro of Buganda; 2013–present	Succeeded by Incumbent
