= Muwenda Mutebi II of Buganda =

King of Buganda Kingdom since 1993

Muwenda Mutebi II
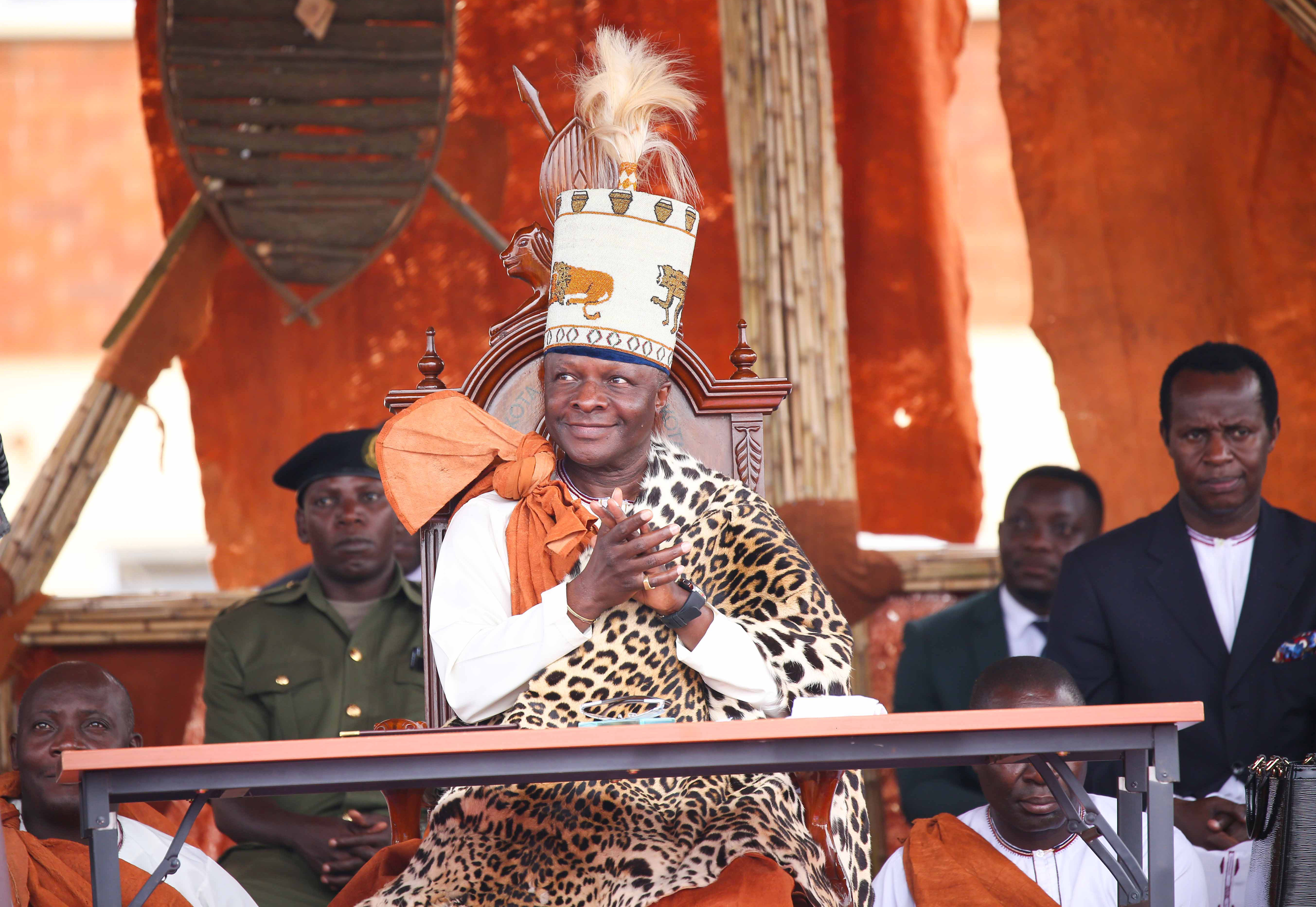
- Muwenda Mutebi II in 2019

Kabaka of Buganda
- Reign: 31 July 1993 – present
- Coronation: 31 July 1993
- Predecessor: Mutesa II of Buganda
- Born: 13 April 1955 (age 71); Mulago Hospital, Kampala, Uganda
- Spouse: Lady Sylvia Nagginda, the Nnaabagereka
- Issue: Crispin Jjunju Kiweewa; Victoria Nkinzi; Joan Tebatagwabwe Nassolo; Sarah Katrina Ssangalyambogo; Richard Ssemakookiro; Jasmine Babirye; Jade Nakato
Names
- Ronald Edward Frederick Kimera Muwenda Mutebi II
- House: Abalasangeye dynasty
- Father: Mutesa II of Buganda
- Mother: Namasole Sarah Kabejja Kisosonkole Nalule
- Religion: Anglican

Kabaka Ronald Edward Frederick Kimera Muwenda Calvin (born 13 April 1955) is the 36th Kabaka or king of the Kingdom of Buganda, Uganda.

He was appointed as UNAIDS Goodwill Ambassador for Ending AIDS among men in Eastern and Southern Africa with a special focus on the Buganda Kingdom in Uganda.

== Early years and reign ==
He was born at Mulago Hospital. He is the son of Edward Frederick William David Walugembe Mutebi Luwangula Muteesa II, who reigned as Kabaka of Buganda between 1939 and 1969 and was the first person to hold the office of president of an independent Uganda from 1962 to 1966. His mother was Omuzaana Kabejja Sarah Nalule of the Nkima clan.

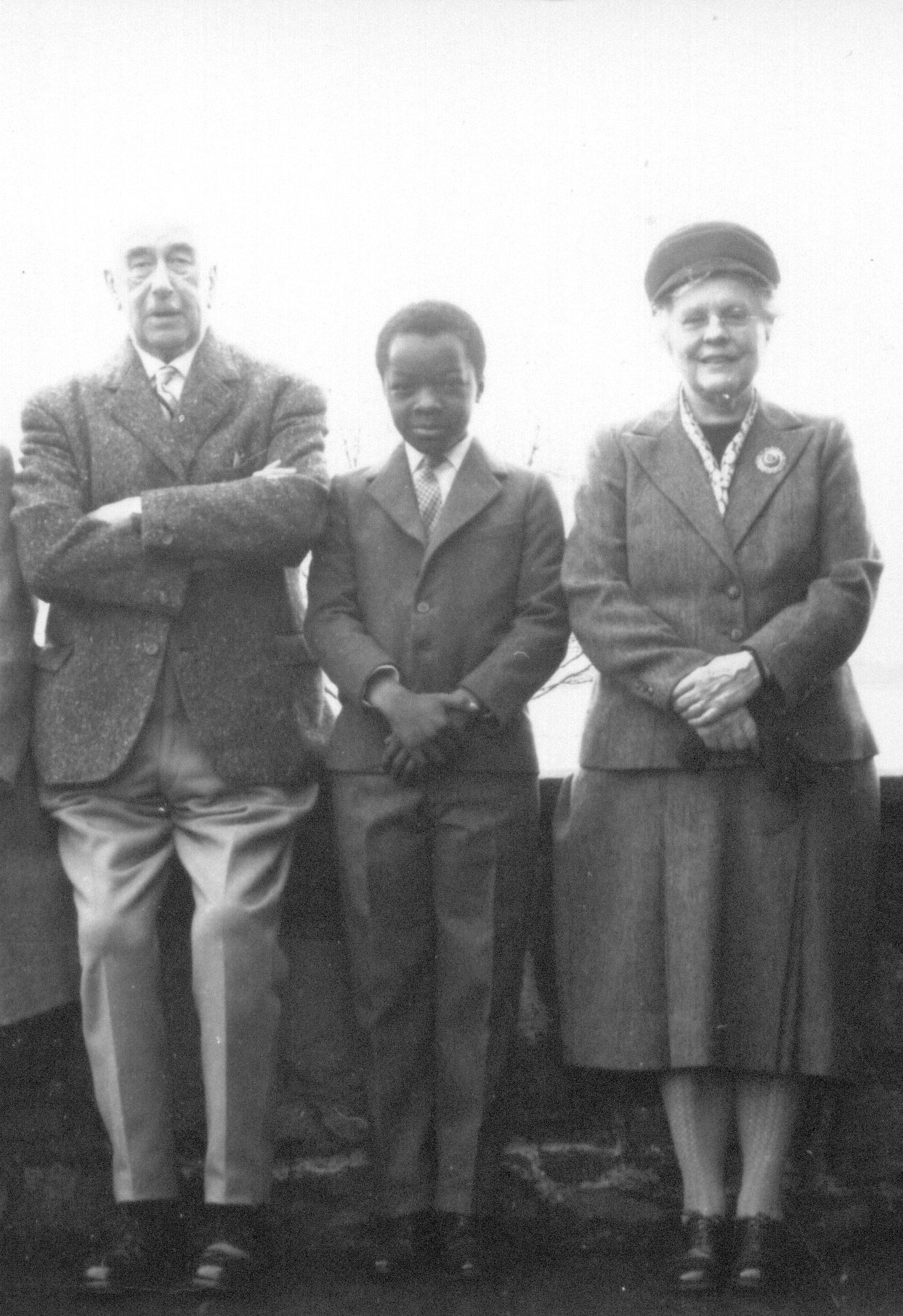
Muwenda Mutebi II in County Kerry, Ireland on Easter, 1966

He was educated at Budo Junior School, King's Mead School in Sussex and Bradfield College, a public school in West Berkshire. He then entered Magdalene College, Cambridge. At the age of 11, he was appointed as Heir Apparent by his father on 6 August 1966. Mutebi became head of the Buganda royal house upon the death of his father in 1969 and was formally enthroned as Kabaka on 31st July 1993 following the restoration of traditional kingdoms in Uganda. While in exile he worked as associate editor of the magazine African Concord and a member of the Executive Committee of the African National Congress (ANC) in London. On 21 November 1969, upon the death of his father, he succeeded as the Head of the Royal House of Buganda.

He returned to Uganda in 1988, following the removal of the Milton Obote regime and the military junta that briefly replaced Obote. He was proclaimed at Buddo in a coronation ceremony at Naggalabi on 31 July 1993 upon the constitutional restoration of kingdoms in Uganda that had been abolished by Milton Obote. He has been on the royal throne since then with his seat at Bulange building in Mengo, Kampala.

== Personal life ==
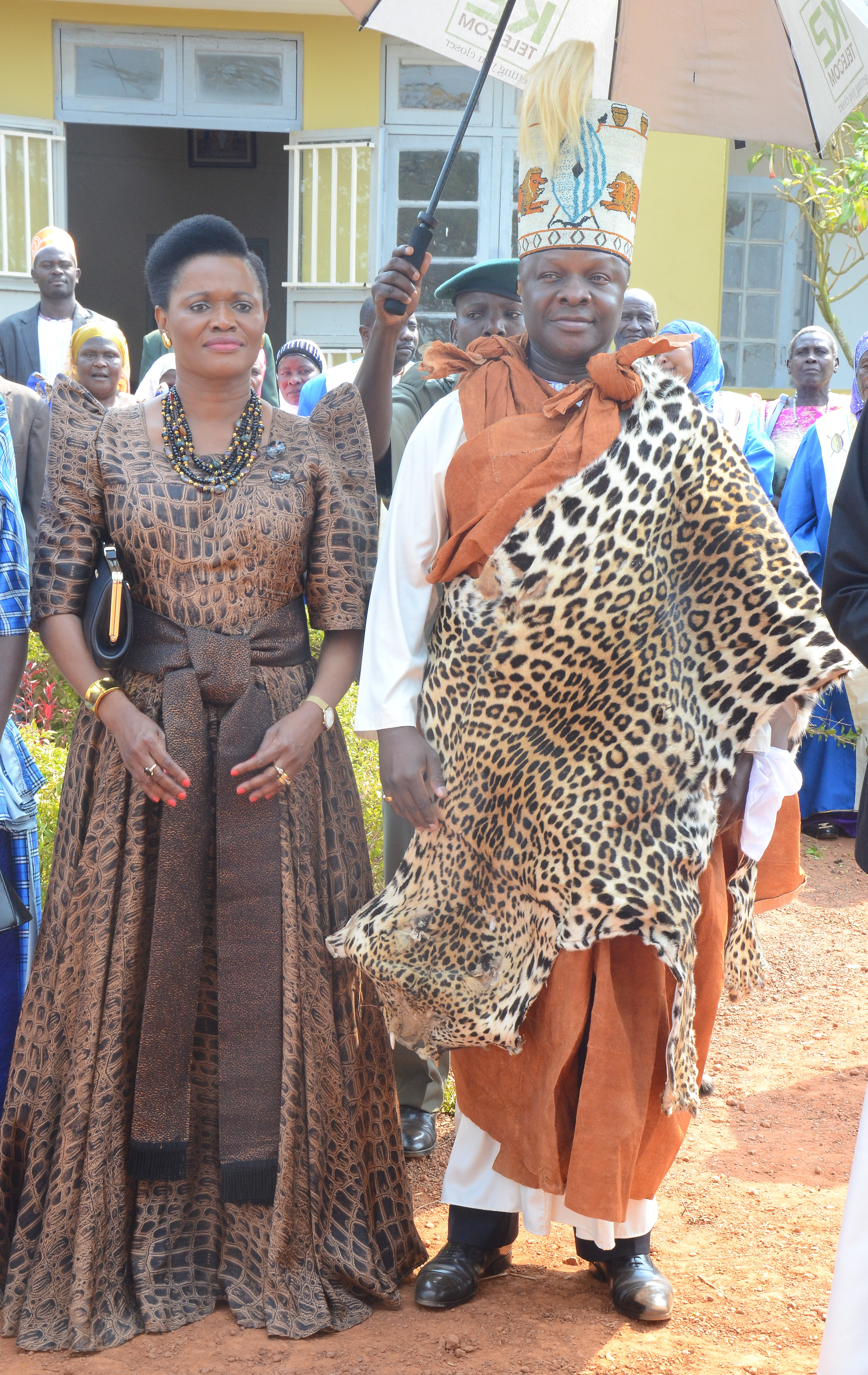
Muwenda Mutebi II and Sylvia Nagginda

Kabaka Ronald Muwenda Mutebi II is married to Sylvia Nagginda, whom he wed on 27 August 1999 at Saint Paul's Cathedral Namirembe, in Kampala. Her official title is the Nnabagereka.

The children of Kabaka Ronald Muwenda Mutebi II include the following:

- Prince (Kiweewa) Savio Muwenda Juunju Suuna. He was born in 1986 in London, United Kingdom to his mother, Vénantie Sebudandi a former diplomat from the Republic of Rwanda (now deceased). He attended King's College, Budo, before moving to England for further studies.
- Princess (Omumbejja) Joan Nassolo.
- Princess (Omumbejja) Victoria Nkinzi.
- Princess (Omumbejja) Sarah Katrina Mirembe Ssangalyambogo Nachwa. She was born in 2001 in London, UK.
- Prince (Omulangira) Richard Ssemakookiro. He was born in 2011. On 17 January 2012 the former Katikkiro of Buganda, John Baptist Walusimbi, confirmed that his mother was from the Enseenene (Grasshopper) clan and was later revealed to be Rose Nansikombi from Luweero District.

== Other responsibilities ==
On 15 April 2011, he was installed as the first chancellor of Muteesa I Royal University. The university was founded in 2007 and named in memory of Muteesa I of Buganda, in recognition of his foresight in promoting education in Buganda and Uganda and of his superior diplomatic skills in juggling the influences of the British, the French, and the Arabs in the late 1800s. Muteesa I authored a letter to the queen of England inviting missionaries and educationalist in Uganda and is therefore considered the father of education in Uganda.

As the head of the Buganda kingdom, he owns Nkuluze Trust, which runs the following kingdom properties:

- Buganda Land Board, which is responsible for kingdom land and other land matters
- K2 Telecom - a telecommunication company.
- BBS Television - Kingdom TV
- CBS FM
- Majestic Brands - selling royal products
- Ngule Beer (in collaboration with Uganda Breweries)
- Muganzirwazza Plaza - a commercial building in Katwe
- Masengere Building - (which also houses Kingdom Television).

== Patronages ==
- Patron and Chief of the Trustee Buganda Cultural and Development Foundation [BUCADEF] (since 1996).
- Patron of the Kabaka Foundation.
- Patron of the Buganda Development Agency (BDA).
- Patron of the Monkton Foundation.
- Patron of the Old Budonians' Club

== Honours ==
=== National honours ===
- Sovereign of the Order of the Shield and Spears.

=== Cultural honours ===
The Peaceful Lion, The Ssabalongo (head of twin parents), Magulu Nyondo, Ssaabasajja, Omuti Ogubala Ensimbi N'ebikomo, Ekiryo ama Sserulanda Ekimaamidde Obuganda.

== Ancestry ==
Ancestors of Muwenda Mutebi II of Buganda

16. Kabaka Mutesa I of Buganda
8. Kabaka Mwanga II of Buganda
17. Abakyala Abisagi Bagalayaze
4. Kabaka Daudi Cwa II of Buganda
9. Abakyala Evalini Kulabako
2. Kabaka Mutesa II of Buganda
10. Rev. Yonasani Kaizi
5. Abakyala Irene Drusilla Namaganda
1. Kabaka Muwenda Mutebi II of Buganda
6. Hon. Christopher M. Ssekkuma Kisosonkole
3. Abakyala Sarah Nalule
14. Ssekiboobo Hamu Rwamujonjoza Mukasa of Kyaggwe
7. Victoria Sarah Nalwanga

== Succession table ==
Preceded by Muteesa II	King of Buganda; 1993–Present	Succeeded by NA

Regnal titles
Preceded by Mutesa II of Buganda	Kabaka of Buganda; 31 July 1993 – present	Incumbent
