= Prosperous =

Prosperous, the adjectival form of Prosperity, may also refer to:

== Places ==
- Prosperous, County Kildare, Ireland, a town
- Prosperous Bay Plain, Saint Helena

== Political parties ==
- Prosperous Armenia
- Prosperous Indonesia Party
- Prosperous Justice Party (Indonesia)
- Prosperous Peace Party (Indonesia)
- Prosperous and Safe Aceh Party (Indonesia)

== Other uses ==
- Prosperous (album), by Christy Moore
- Prosperous and Qualified, 1988 album by free jazz ensemble Universal Congress Of
- The Prosperous Few and the Restless Many, 1992 book compiling three interviews of Noam Chomsky by David Barsamian
- Battle of Prosperous, in the Irish Rebellion of 1798
- Prosperous Nankindu Kavuma, Ugandan educationist and author
