= Irene Drusilla Namaganda =

First woman to have the title of Nnabagerekka (queen consort) of the kingdom of Buganda.

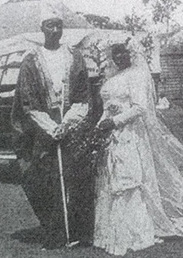
- Irene Drusilla Namaganda (right) and Daudi Cwa II on their wedding day
- Born: November 11, 1896
- Died: September 15, 1957; London
- Spouse: Daudi Cwa II of Buganda
- Children: Mutesa II of Buganda

Lady Irene Drusilla Namaganda (November 11, 1896 – September 15, 1957) was the first woman to have the title of Nnabagerekka (queen consort) of the kingdom of Buganda. She was Nnabagerekka and first wife of Kabaka (king) Daudi Chwa II and Nnamasole (queen mother) to her son Mutesa II. She was deposed as Nnamasole in a notorious public trial for having a relationship with a commoner.

Irene Drusilla Namaganda was born on November 11, 1896, the daughter of Anglican clergyman Yonasani Kaidzi and his wife Ketula Nakato Kaidzi. She attended Gayaza High School, created by the Church Missionary Society to educate the children of Buganda's elites. She married Daudi Chwa in 1914 when both were eighteen years old. He bestowed on her the new title of Nnabagerekka instead of the traditional title of Kaddulubale (senior wife). Despite the intent that their marriage be a Christian one intended to showcase Buganda's adoption of Anglicanism, Daudi Chwa accumulated sixteen other wives and fathered 36 children. Together they had two children, Princess Margaret Juliana Lwantale and Prince Edward Mutesa II.

Daudi Chwa died in 1939. The teenage Mutesa became the next Kabaka and Namaganda became Nnamasole. Namaganda soon began a relationship with Simoni Petero Kigozi, a school teacher nineteen years younger than her. She became pregnant and they married in 1941. The political scandal that erupted resulted in a series of court cases from 1941 and 1943, culminating in the exile of the couple from the capital of Buganda, the resignation of Prime Minister Martin Luther Nsibirwa, and Namaganda's deposition as Nnamasole in favor of her elder sister Perepetwa Nnaabawesi Kaidzi.

In 1949, Namaganda joined the radical Christian movement Balokole and became a prominent speaker at Balokole events.

Irene Drusilla Namaganda died of uterine cancer on 15 September 1957 in London.
