= Cork Militia =

Auxiliary force of the British Army

The Cork Militia was an auxiliary military force in County Cork in Ireland. From their early existence in the 16th and 17th Centuries and then their formal organisation in 1793, the Militia regiments of the county served in home defence in most of the major wars involving Britain and Ireland. After service in South Africa during the Second Boer War they trained thousands of reinforcements during World War I. They were formally disbanded in 1922 following Irish Independence.

== Early units ==
The earliest record of militia units in County Cork is from 1584, when they were organised as follows:

- City of Cork: 300 'shot' (musketeers), 100 billmen
- Baronry of Muskerry: 20 shot, 300 bills
- Baronry of Imokilly: 12 shot, 80 bills
- Baronry of Condons: 8 shot, 60 bills
- 'Lord Barry's County' (Baronry of Carbery): 30 shot, 200 bills
- 'Mac-Carty More' (the lands of the MacCarthy Mor dynasty): 8 shot, 400 bills

After the Stuart Restoration of 1660 more formal militia forces were organised in Ireland. In August 1666 the Lord Lieutenant, the Duke of Ormond, made a 'progress' through County Cork and was accompanied by the horse militia of each barony. The following year the militia of the City of Cork consisted of 600 foot and 60 horse; in 1681 they were 500 foot and 'two gallant troops of horse'. During the Williamite War in Ireland the Governor of Cork, Sir Richard Cox, increased the militia of the county in 1691 to three regiments of foot (6000 men) and 26 independent troops of horse. They held several garrisons for King William III, took part in numerous skirmishes, and assisted at the capture of Sligo. During the Siege of Limerick 1000 of the Cork Militia held the pass of Killaloe for which they were thanked by William's commander General Godert de Ginkel. It was not until 1715 that the Irish Militia came under statutory authority. In 1746 during the War of the Austrian Succession the militia of County Cork consisted of 3000 foot and 200 horse; by 1760 in the Seven Years' War this had dwindled to two foot regiments of 8 companies each, totalling 960 men.

By the War of American Independence, with a serious threat of invasion by the Americans' allies, France and Spain, Ireland had no national militia. The Parliament of Ireland passed a Militia Act, but this failed to create an effective force. However it opened the way for the paramilitary Irish Volunteers to fill the gap. The Volunteers were outside the control of either the parliament or the Dublin Castle administration. When the invasion threat receded they diminished in numbers but remained a political force. On the outbreak of the French Revolutionary War In 1793, the Irish administration passed an effective Militia Act that created an official Irish Militia. The new Act was based on existing English precedents, with the men being conscripted by ballot to fill county quotas (paid substitutes were permitted) and the officers having to meet certain property qualifications.

== Cork Militia ==
In March 1793 County Cork was given a quota of 1464 men to find, to be organised into three regiments each of 488 men in 8 companies:

- North Cork Militia at Fermoy
- South Cork Militia at Rathcormac
- Royal Cork City Militia at Cork

The new militia was widely unpopular, and Cork was one of the slower counties to fill its quota. The order to embody the three regiments for service was not issued until 30 September and it was not carried out until 15 October. In 1795 the Irish militia was augmented, and each of the County Cork regiments was raised to an establishment of 612 men.

The French Revolutionary and Napoleonic Wars saw the British and Irish militia embodied for a whole generation, becoming regiments of full-time professional soldiers (though restricted to service in Britain or Ireland respectively), which the Regular Army increasingly saw as a prime source of recruits. They served in coast defences, manned garrisons, guarded prisoners of war, and carried out internal security duties.

Anxiety about a possible French invasion of Ireland grew during the autumn of 1796 and preparations were made for field operations. A large French expeditionary force appeared in Bantry Bay on 21 December and troops from all over Ireland were marched towards the threatened area. Soon afterwards news arrived that the French fleet had been scattered by the winter storms. Several ships had been wrecked and none of the French troops succeeded in landing; there was no sign of a rising by the United Irishmen. The invasion was called off on 29 December, and the troop concentration was dispersed in early 1797.

In 1797 the light companies of the militia were detached to join composite battalions drawn from several militia and regular regiments. The light companies of the three Cork regiments joined 1st Light Battalion. The militia regiments were each issued with two light six-pounder 'battalion guns', with the gun detachments trained by the Royal Artillery. When the militiamen of 1793 reached the end of their four-year enlistment in 1797, most of the Irish regiments were able to maintain their numbers through re-enlistments (for a bounty).

=== North Cork Militia ===
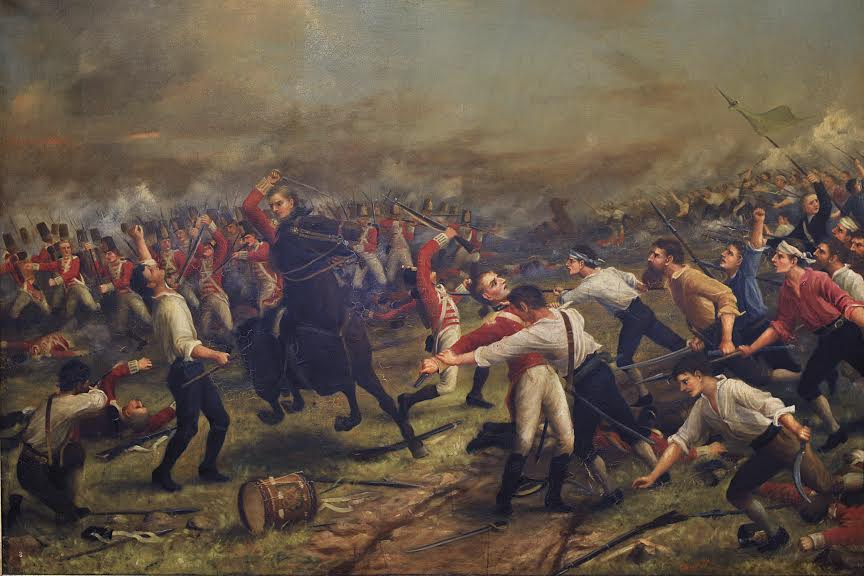
1898 painting of the United Irishmen's charge at Oulart Hill.

The expected Irish Rebellion finally broke out in May 1798, with large rebel forces active in County Wexford, where the North Cork Militia was stationed. A detachment of the regiment was overwhelmed at the Battle of Oulart Hill, after which several small garrisons were withdrawn into the town of Wexford. A detachment of the North Cork helped to defend Enniscorthy against a fierce attack, but were obliged to withdraw from the burning town after nightfall. After sacking the town the rebels concentrated at an encampment on nearbyVinegar Hill. The commanders at Wexford decided that without reinforcements the town was indefensible and ordered a retreat to Duncannon Fort. The North Cork had got to within 6 miles (9.7 km) of Duncannon after dark when they were attacked in the rear and suffered heavy casualties at Taylorstown Bridge. Other detachments of the regiment served in the successful defence of Carlow, the defeat of a rebel force at Ballycanew, and in the Battle of Arklow where the rebel advance was halted. The Light Company served in the decisive Battle of Vinegar Hill that broke the Wexford Rebellion, though the regiment was engaged in several subsequent actions. Over the following weeks the remaining rebel groups in other part of Ireland were largely destroyed before a French force arrived on 22 August, too late to effect the outcome, and after initial success was forced to surrender on 8 September.

After the rebellion the Irish Militia settled down to garrison duty once more. With the diminishing threat of invasion after 1799, the strength of the militia could be reduced, and the surplus men were encouraged to volunteer for regiments of the line. The light battalions were reformed in 1800, with the Cork companies once more in 1st Light Bn.

The Treaty of Amiens brought a halt to hostilities in 1802, but the peace was short-lived and preparations to re-embody the militia began in November 1802. Early in 1803 the regiments were ordered to begin re-enrolling former militiamen and new volunteers as well as using the ballot. The proclamation to embody the militia was issued on 15 March and carried out on 25 March.

Anti-invasion preparations were now put in hand and the reconstituted militia regiments underwent training, although most were not considered well enough trained to go into camp during the summer of 1804. The light battalions were reformed in September 1803 but were discontinued in 1806. Over the following years the regiments carried out garrison duties at various towns across Ireland and attended summer training camps.

The Napoleonic Wars were brought to an end by the Battle of Waterloo in 1815, and the Cork Militia was disembodied on 1 April 1816.

After Waterloo there was a long peace. Although ballots were still held until they were suspended by the Militia Act 1829, the regiments were rarely assembled for training and the permanent staffs of sergeants and drummers (who were occasionally used to maintain public order) were progressively reduced, though the statutory establishment of the disembodied regiment was still eight companies. Officers continued to be commissioned sporadically; in 1845–46 there was an effort to replace elderly members of the permanent staff and to appoint a few younger officers from the county gentry, though they had no duties to perform. At some point before 1850 the North Cork Militia became a rifle corps, adopting a Rifle green uniform.

The Militia of the United Kingdom was revived by the Militia Act 1852, enacted during a period of international tension. As before, units were raised and administered on a county basis, and filled by voluntary enlistment (although conscription by means of the Militia Ballot might be used if the counties failed to meet their quotas). Training was for 56 days on enlistment, then for 21–28 days per year, during which the men received full army pay. Under the Act, Militia units could be embodied by Royal Proclamation for full-time home defence 'in case of national danger or pressing necessity'. Militia units now had a large cadre of permanent staff (about 30) and a number of the officers were former Regulars. Around a third of the recruits and many young officers went on to join the Regular Army.

When the regiment was revived in 1852 it was designated as the North Cork Rifles. The Crimean War having broken out in 1854 and a large expeditionary force sent overseas, the militia were called out for home defence. The North Cork Rifles spent the last months of its embodiment at Aldershot Camp in England, until it was stood down in August 1856. There was a partial mobilisation of the militia when large forces were sent to suppress the Indian Mutiny in 1857. The North Cork Rifles crossed to England again, taking up various stations, and including a year at Aldershot. In late 1859 it moved to Scotland before being disembodied early in 1860.

Annual training for the Irish Militia was suspended from 1866 to 1870 at the time of the Fenian crisis. The Militia Reserve introduced in 1867 consisted of present and former militiamen who undertook to serve overseas in case of war. Some of these were called out in 1878 during the Balkan Crisis.

=== South Cork Militia ===
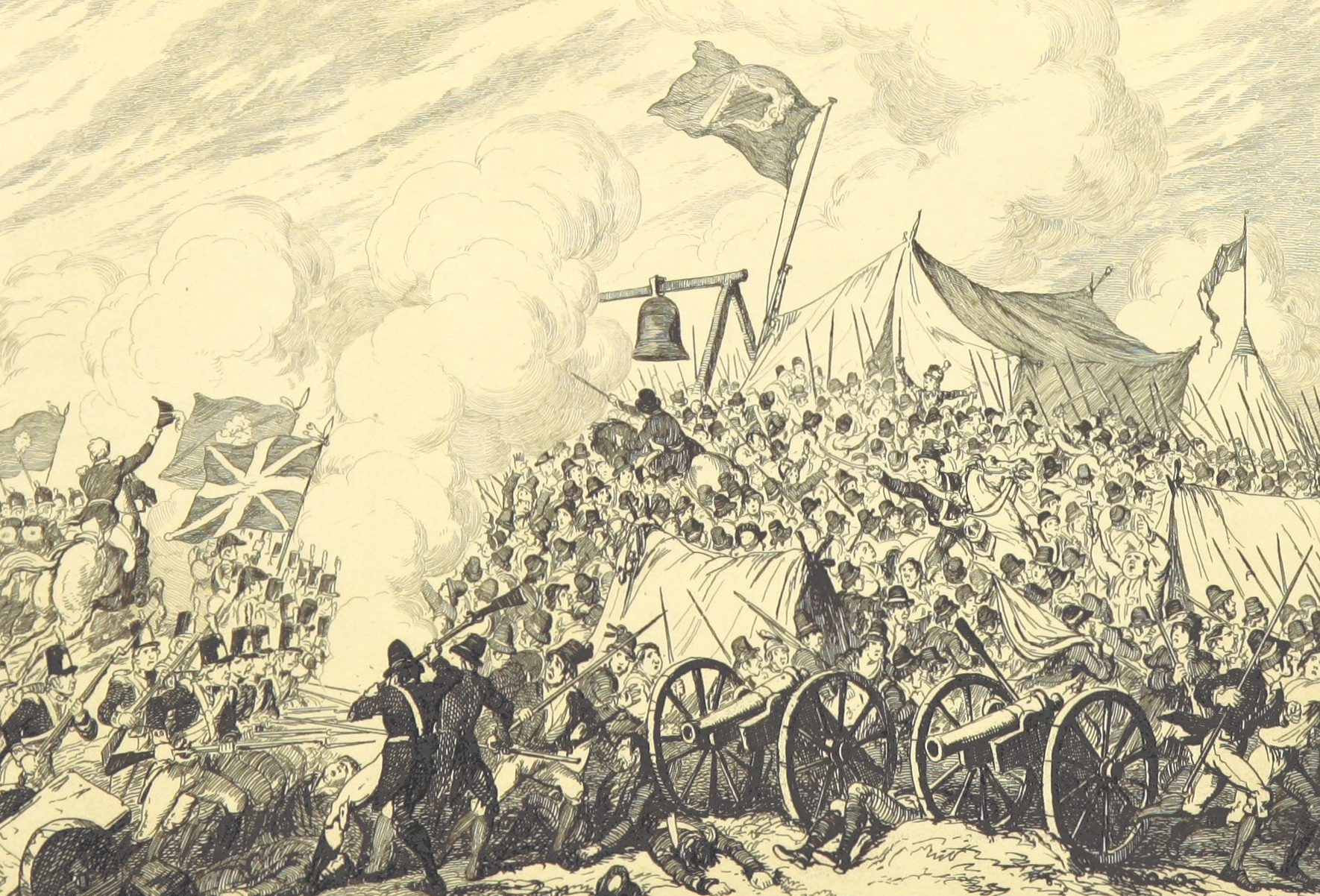
1845 engraving of the Battle of Vinegar Hill.

The regiment was one of those that took part in the forced march from Limerick to repel the invasion at Bantry Bay in 1796, and its Light Company served with the 1st Light Battalion at Vinegar Hill. The Interchange Act 1811 passed in July allowed Irish militia regiments to serve in England and vice versa for up to two years. The South Cork was one of the regiments that volunteered and served in England from June 1812 to October 1814.

During the long peace after Waterloo the disembodied regiment was redesignated as the South Cork Militia (Light Infantry) at some point before 1840. After the regiment was revived in 1852 it was called out during the Crimean War, serving in Co Cork, and afterwards at Dublin. It was not among the regiments embodied during the Indian Mutiny.

=== Royal Cork City Militia ===
When the Irish Rebellion broke out on 23 May 1798, the Royal Cork City Militia fomred part of the garrison of Dublin. On the first day they were drawn up with their battalion guns in St Stephen's Green; the city remained quiet. However, a detachment of the Light Company at the town of Prosperous was surprised at night and wiped out. Rathangan, County Kildare, was also attacked, but the garrison held on for four days before the main body of the Royal Cork arrived from Dublin to relieve them. The Light Company fought at Vinegar Hill with the 1st Light Bn.

When the militia was revived in 1852 the traditional infantry regiments were supplemented by artillery militia. Their role was to man coastal defences and fortifications, relieving the Royal Artillery (RA) for active service. The revived Royal Cork City Militia was converted into the Cork City Artillery of four batteries in December 1854, but within a few months it was renamed theRoyal Cork City Artillery.

During the Crimean War the regiment was embodied and served at Ballincollig Barracks on the outskirts of Cork. It also provided volunteers for the Regulars. It was not embodied during the Indian Mutiny, but again supplied volunteers.

=== West Cork Artillery Militia ===
A new 3rd Cork Artillery, soon redesignated the West Cork Artillery Militia, was formed at Kinsale at the end of 1854, with six batteries. Soon after embodiment it was sent to garrison Charles Fort in Kinsale Harbour during the Crimean War.

== Cardwell and Childers Reforms ==
Under the 'Localisation of the Forces' scheme introduced by the Cardwell Reforms of 1872, infantry militia regiments were brigaded with their local linked regular regiments. For the Cork Militia this was in Sub-District No 70 (Counties of Kerry, Cork and Clare) in Cork District of Irish Command:

- 101st Regiment of Foot (Royal Bengal Fusiliers)
- 104th Regiment of Foot (Bengal Fusiliers)
- South Cork Light Infantry at Bandon
- Clare Militia at Ennis
- Kerry Militia at Tralee
- North Cork Rifles at Mallow
- Royal Limerick County Militia at Limerick
- No 70 Brigade Depot was formed at Tralee

Although often referred to as brigades, the sub-districts were purely administrative organisations, but in a continuation of the Cardwell Reforms a mobilisation scheme began to appear in the Army List from December 1875. This assigned Regular and Militia units to places in an order of battle of corps, divisions and brigades for the 'Active Army', even though these formations were entirely theoretical, with no staff or services assigned. The North and South Cork Militia were assigned to 2nd Brigade of 3rd Division, II Corps, which would have mustered at Horsham in Surrey in time of war. Similarly the Royal Cork City Artillery's war station was in the Portland Harbour defences in England, while the West Cork Artillery would have been distributed with a number of other Irish militia artillery units in various of small forts and batteries, including Charles Fort and Kinsale.

The Childers Reforms took Cardwell's reforms further, with the militia infantry regiments becoming numbered battalions of their linked regiments. On 1 July 1881 the 101st and 104th Regiments became the 1st and 2nd Battalions of the Royal Munster Fusiliers, and the South Cork Light Infantry Militia became the 4th Battalion. However, in a change of policy, the Clare Militia was instead converted to artillery the following year and the South Corks were redesignated the 3rd (South Cork Militia) Battalion, Royal Munster Fusiliers. Meanwhile the North Cork Rifles became the 9th (North Cork Militia) Battalion, King's Royal Rifle Corps.

=== South Irish Division, Royal Artillery ===
Meanwhile the Militia Artillery had also been reorganised in 1882. It was now in 11 divisions of garrison artillery and the West Cork and Royal Cork City units became the 2nd Brigade and 3rd Brigade respectively of the South Irish Division, Royal Artillery, at Kinsale and Cork. When the South Irish Division was abolished on 1 July 1889 and absorbed into the Southern Division, the titles were altered to West Cork Artillery (Southern Division) RA and Cork City Artillery (Southern Division) RA respectively. The West Cork were at Fort Westmorland on Spike Island in Cork Harbour, while the Cork City were at Fort Elizabeth, Cork.

On 1 September 1890 the Cork City Artillery absorbed the larger West Cork Artillery to form the Cork Artillery, with HQ at Fort Elizabeth.

In 1899 the Royal Artillery was divided into two distinct branches, field and garrison. The garrison branch was named the Royal Garrison Artillery (RGA) and included coast defence, position, heavy, siege and mountain artillery, the militia units manning fixe coast defences. The unit was redesignated the Cork Royal Garrison Artillery (Militia).

=== Second Boer War ===
With the bulk of the Regular Army (reinforced by the Militia Reserve) serving in South Africa during the Second Boer War, the Militia were called out for home defence. While the Cork RGA (M) served at home for six months, both the 9th KRRC and 3rd RMF volunteered for overseas service and were sent to South Africa.

The 9th KRRC arrived at Cape Town on 1 February 1900. It took over railway defence duties, and when Maj-Gen Ralph Clements' force evacuated fell back from Rensburg on 14 February, part of the battalion took part in the covering action before falling back to Nauwpoort and joining in the defence of the railway junction. After the surrender of the main Boer army at Paardeberg the pressure on Nauwpoort was released and Clements was able to advance, repairing the railway as he went. Over the following months the battalion guarded railway bridges and bridging operations, and escorted supply convoys. Its night patrols foiled Boer attempts to mine the railway. The battalion embarked for home in July 1901.

The 3rd Bn RMF also arrived in South Africa in February 1900 and was stationed in various garrisons. It went 'on trek' with Sir Henry Settle's column, and afterwards manned the chain of blockhouses along the Kimberley railway. After one of the longest deployments of any of the militia battalions, 3rd RMF re-embarked for home in March 1902, shortly before hostilities ended with the Treaty of Vereeniging.

== Special Reserve ==
After the Boer War, the future of the militia was called into question. There were moves to reform the Auxiliary Forces (Militia, Yeomanry and Volunteers) to take their place in the six Army Corps proposed by the Secretary of State for War, St John Brodrick. However, little of Brodrick's scheme was carried out. Under the more sweeping Haldane Reforms of 1908, the Militia was replaced by the Special Reserve (SR), a semi-professional force whose role was to provide reinforcement drafts for regular units serving overseas in wartime, rather like the earlier Militia Reserve. The 3rd (South Cork Militia) Bn, RMF, became the 4th (Extra Reserve) Bn, Royal Munster Fusiliers, but the 9th KRRC did not transfer to the new force and was disbanded.

Most of the RGA Militia units were initially converted into reserve field artillery, but these were soon scrapped. The Territorial Force (TF) was to take over reserve duties in coastal batteries, but the TF did not exist in Ireland, so the Antrim and Cork RGA (M) were retained in the SR.

=== World War I ===
On the outbreak of World War I on 4 August 1914 the 4th (ER) Bn, RMF, took up its war station in the defences at Queenstown, later at Cork Harbour. The SR battalions had the dual roles of coast defence and preparing drafts of reinforcements (reservists, special reservists, and new recruits) for the Regular battalions overseas. In May 1915 the 4th (ER) Bn moved to the Tyne Defences at South Shields in England, but was back in Ireland by September. About November 1917 it moved to Scotland, and by April 1918 it was at Portobello, Edinburgh. Following the Easter Rising in 1916, voluntary recruitment in Ireland had dwindled away, and the Government was not prepared to impose conscription in the island. In May 1918 the 4th (ER) Bn was absorbed into the 3rd (Reserve) Bn in garrison at Plymouth in England.

Throughout the war the Cork RGA (SR) was in South Irish Coast Defences covering the defended ports of Queenstown and Berehaven. The RGA (SR) units also supplied officers and men to the new RGA units being formed for overseas service. In October 1918 the coastal artillery of the United Kingdom was reorganised into Fire Commands, which took over existing district establishments and the Regular, SR and TF companies. The Cork RGA was absorbed into Nos 31 & 32 (Cork) Fire Commands at Berehaven and Queenstown respectively.

=== Disbandment ===
Although the Special Reserve reverted to its old title of Militia in 1921, the Cork regiments were not reactivated after the war. They were formally disbanded on 31 July 1922 following Irish Independence.
