= Cotilda Nakate Kikomeko =

Owek. Cotilda Nakate Kikomeko
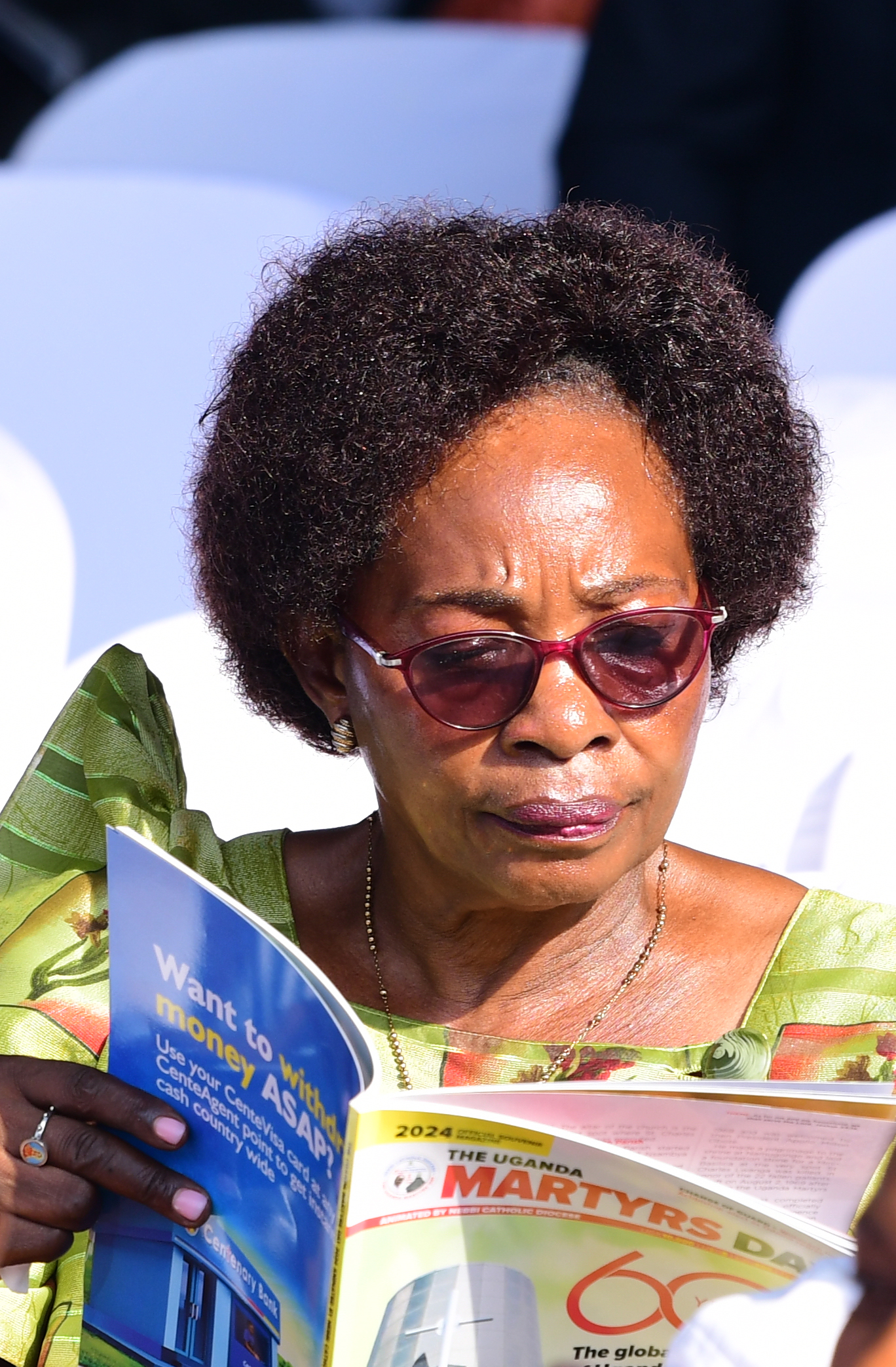
- Owek. Cotilda Nakate Kikomeko, Minister of Social Services, Buganda Kingdom
- Born: Uganda
- Occupations: Educator, Public Servant
- Employer: Buganda Kingdom
- Organizations: Buganda Kingdom; Wakiso District Headteachers’ Association; Ministry of Education and Sports; Makerere University Visitation Committee
- Known for: Minister of Social Services, Buganda Kingdom; Headteacher, Trinity College Nabbingo (2002–2018); * Educational leadership and advocacy
- Title: Owekitibwa
- Predecessor: Prosperous Nankindu Kavuma

Cotilda Nakate Kikomeko is the minister of Social Services in the office of Nnaabagereka in Buganda Kingdom. She is a former headteacher of Trinity College Nabbingo from 2002 to 2018. She also worked as the chairperson Wakiso District Headteachers' Association.

== Career ==
Nakate is currently serving the Buganda Kingdom as the minister of Social Services in the office of Nnaabagereka. She was the third black African Headteacher of Trinity College Nabbingo and served for 16 years (2002–2018). She was among the 17 selected members of the White paper committee to review the Rwendeire Visitation committee report on Makerere. She chaired the Buganda Kingdom Education Committee and worked with the Ministry of Education and Sports. She was the chairperson of Secondary School Headteachers in Uganda.

== Legacy ==
She has been given the title of Ow'ekitiibwa in the Buganda Kingdom. The title "Ow'ekitiibwa," abbreviated as "Owek.", is a traditional title in the Buganda Kingdom that indicates nobility or a position of respect. The title is part of a broader system of titles within the Buganda Kingdom, emphasizing the cultural hierarchy and the significance of leadership roles in Ugandan society. Notable individuals who have held the title include Owek. Charles Peter Mayiga and Owek. Ezekerial Tenywa Wako, both of whom have contributed to the leadership and cultural heritage of Buganda.

== See also ==
- Charles Peter Mayiga
- Ezekerial Tenywa Wako
- Nnaabagereka of Buganda
- Sylvia of Buganda
- Kabaka of Buganda
