= Prosperous Nankindu Kavuma =

Buganda Kingdom minister

- Citizenship: Uganda
- Education: PhD (Linguistics) University of Western Cape, South Africa, Masters Of Education (Language and Literature Education) Makerere University, Bachelor of Arts with Education Makerere University
- Alma mater: University of Western Cape, Makerere University
- Known for: Multi-lingual activism
- Title: Owek. Dr.
- Successor: Cotilda Nakate Kikomeko
- Board member of: Board member for British Association for International and Comparative Education (BAICE) and International Literacy Association (ILA)

Prosperous Nankindu Kavuma is an teacher, researcher, and author. She is the former minister of social services and the office of Nnaabagereka in Buganda Kingdom.

== Background and education ==
She holds a PhD in linguistics from the University of the Western Cape, South Africa, a Masters Of Education degree in Language and Literature Education from Makerere University, Uganda and a Bachelor of Arts degree in Education from Makerere University, Uganda. She attended St. Joseph's S.S. Kakindu for her Advanced Level Education and Mityana S.S Namukozi in Mityana, Uganda for her Ordinary Level education.

== Career ==
Between 2019 and 2023 Nankindu served as a cabinet minister overseeing Social services and the Office of the Nnaabagereka in the Kingdom of Buganda, Uganda. Prior to that, from 2016 to 2019, she served as the Minister of State for Education. She holds positions on several boards and is a member of professional organizations such as the British Association for International and Comparative Education (BAICE) and the International Literacy Association (ILA).

She was a lecturer at Kyambogo University, professional tutor at the University of Western Cape in the Department of Linguistics, assistant lecturer in charge of teacher education in Uganda at Kyambogo University. She also taught at SOS Hermann Gmeinner Schools Kakiri, both primary and secondary, and Bombo Army Secondary School in Bombo.

== Publications ==
- Oosterom, Marjoke; Namuggala, Victoria; Nankindu, Prosperous (2023). "Workplace sexual harassment as a feature of precarious work in Uganda's agro-processing factories: "Mince your words and watch yourself"". Development Policy Review. 41 (4). doi:10.1111/dpr.12695. ISSN 0950-6764.
- Institute of Development Studies; Oosterom, Marjoke; Huq, Lopita; Namuggala, Victoria Flavia; Nazneen, Sohela; Nankindu, Prosperous; Sultan, Maheen; Sultana, Asifa; Azim, Firdous (7 June 2022). The Gendered Price of Precarity: Voicing and Challenging Workplace Sexual Harassment (Report). doi:10.19088/ids.2022.030.

== See also ==
- Cotilda Nakate Kikomeko
- Joyce Nabbosa Ssebugwawo
- Queen Sylvia of Buganda
