= Mutesa II of Buganda =

Monarch of the Kingdom of Buganda from 1939 to 1969

Mutesa II
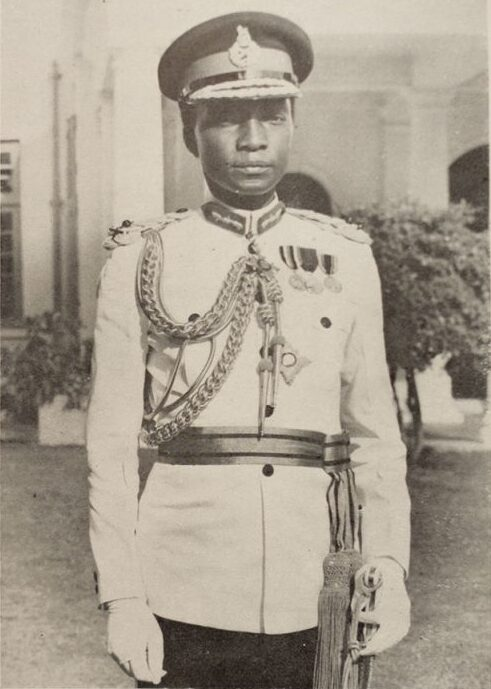
- Mutesa II at Uganda independence anniversary in 1964

Kabaka of Buganda
- Reign: 22 November 1939 – 21 November 1969
- Coronation: 19 November 1942; Budo, Uganda Protectorate
- Predecessor: Daudi Cwa II of Buganda
- Successor: Muwenda Mutebi II of Buganda

1st President of Uganda
- In office 9 October 1963 – 24 February 1966 (de jure); 9 October 1963 – 25 May 1966 (de facto)
- Preceded by: Elizabeth II (as Queen of Uganda); Sir Walter Coutts (as Governor-General of Uganda)
- Succeeded by: Milton Obote
- Born: 19 November 1924; Makindye, Kampala Buganda, Protectorate of Uganda
- Died: 21 November 1969 (aged 45); Rotherhithe, London, England
- Burial: Kasubi Nabulagala
- Consort: 1. Naabakyaala Damali Catherine Nnakawombe, the Naabagereka; 2. Lady Edith Kasozi; 3. Omubiitokati Beatrice Kabasweka; 4. Lady Kate Ndagire; 5. Naabakyaala Sarah Nalule; 6. Muzaana Nalwooga; 7. Lady Nesta M. Rugumayo; 8. Lady Kaakako Rwanchwende; 9. Lady Winifred Keihangwe; 10. Lady Zibiah Wangari Ngatho; 11. Lady Catherine Karungu; 12. Lady Naome Nanyonga; 13. Lady Margaret Nakato
- Issue: 14 sons and 9 daughters
Names
- Kabaka Sir Edward Frederick William David Walugembe Mutebi Luwangula Muteesa II, KBE
- House: Abalasangeye dynasty
- Father: Daudi Cwa II of Buganda
- Mother: Namasole Irene Drusilla Namaganda

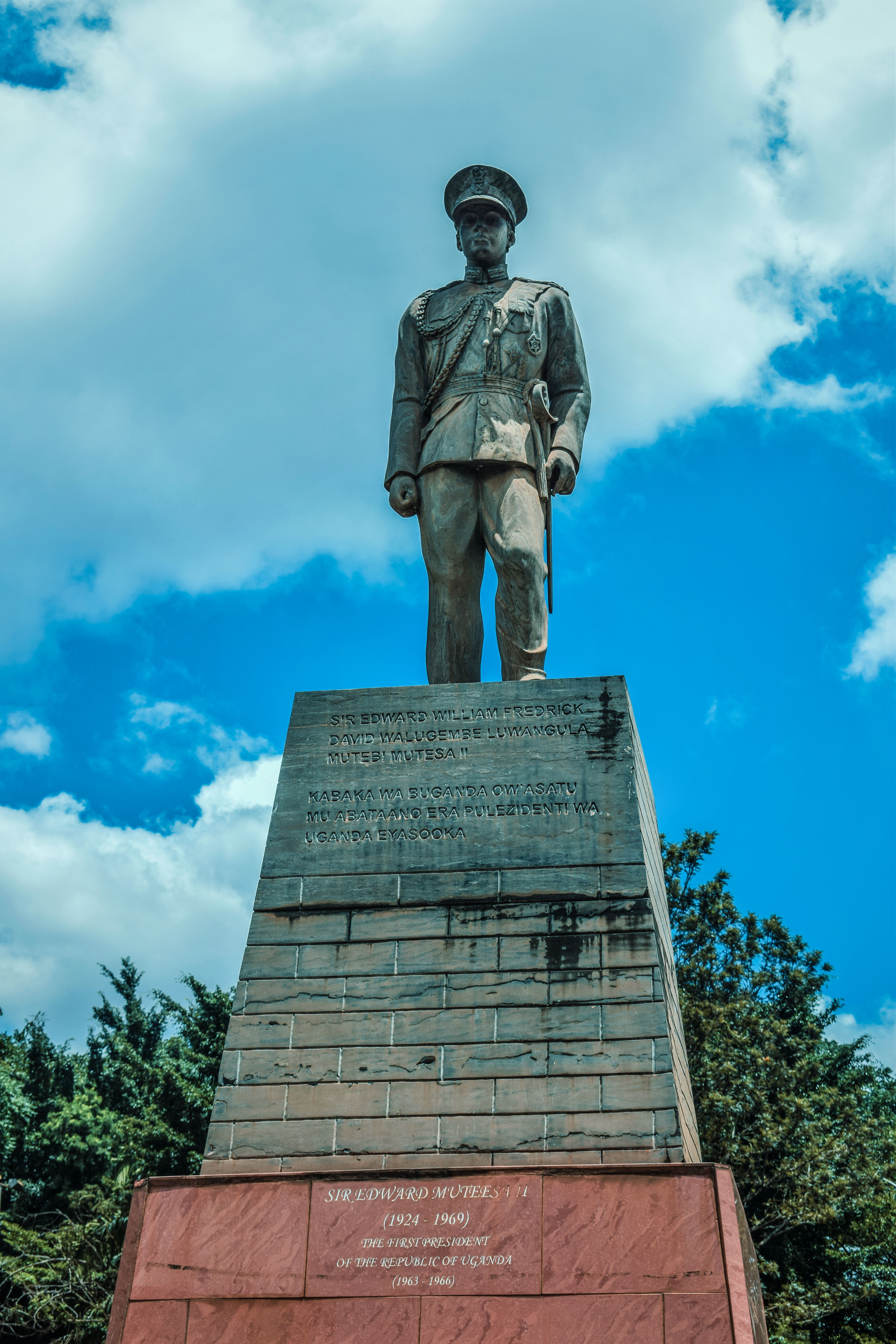
Statue of Sir Edward Mutesa II in Uganda

Edward Frederick William David Walugembe Mutebi Luwangula Mutesa II (19 November 1924 – 21 November 1969) was a Ugandan royal and statesman who served as the first president of Uganda from 1962 to 1966, when he was overthrown by Milton Obote. Mutesa was also the Kabaka (King) of the traditional kingdom of Buganda in Uganda from 22 November 1939 until his death in 1969.

He was often referred as King Freddie by the foreign press, a name rarely used in Uganda. Mutesa's defence of Bagandan interests and traditional autonomy led to conflicts with his erstwhile political ally Milton Obote, who would eventually overthrow him.

Mutesa was crowned Kabaka on his 18th birthday in 1942, three years after the death of his father Daudi Cwa II of Buganda during British colonial rule in Uganda. In 1953, he attempted to have Buganda secede to retain the kingdom's independence from a proposed British colonial federation in East Africa. He was deposed and exiled by British colonial governor Andrew Cohen, but was allowed to return to the country two years later in the wake of a popular backlash known as the Kabaka Crisis under the terms of the 1955 Buganda Agreement.

In the years preceding Uganda's independence from the United Kingdom in 1962, Mutesa became part of the monarchist Kabaka Yekka party which then formed a coalition with Milton Obote's Uganda People's Congress. The year after Uganda's independence, Mutesa was named the first President of Uganda (then a non-executive position) in 1963 with Obote as Prime Minister. Mutesa's alliance with Obote collapsed in 1964 over the Ugandan lost counties referendum. It worsened in 1966, resulting in Obote overthrowing him and forcing him into exile in the United Kingdom, where he died three years later.

== Early life ==
Mutesa was born at the house of Albert Ruskin Cook in Makindye, Kampala, on 19 November 1924, the fifth son of the Kabaka Daudi Cwa II, who reigned between 1897 and 1939. Mutesa's mother was Lady Irene Drusilla Namaganda, of the Nte clan. He was educated at King's College Budo, a prestigious school in Uganda.

During his early years, Mutesa was exposed to both traditional Ganda leadership structures and British colonial education, which later influenced his role as a constitutional monarch.

Upon the death of his father on 22 November 1939, he was elected Kabaka by the Lukiiko at the age of 15 and was installed outside the Lubiri at Mengo on 25 November 1939. He reigned under a Council of Regents until he came of age and assumed full powers.

== Education ==
He attended King's College Budo before he went to England to complete his education at Magdalene College, Cambridge, where he joined the University Officer Training Corps and was subsequently commissioned as a captain in the Grenadier Guards.

== Reign ==
Mutesa II was crowned as Kabaka at Buddo on 19 November 1942, his eighteenth birthday. At that time, Buganda was still part of the Uganda Protectorate, a territory within the British Empire.

The years between 1945 and 1950 saw widespread protests against both the Governor of Uganda's and Kabaka Mutesa's governments.

In the early 1950s, the British Government floated the idea of uniting British East Africa (Uganda, Kenya and Tanganyika) into a federation. Africans feared that this would lead to their coming under the control of Kenya's white settler community, as had happened in the Federation of Rhodesia and Nyasaland. The Baganda, fearing they would lose the limited autonomy they had under British rule, were particularly opposed. Kabaka Mutesa himself opposed the proposal, and thus came into conflict with the British Governor, Sir Andrew Cohen, prompting the Kabaka crisis. In 1953, the Lukiiko (Parliament) of Buganda sought independence from the Uganda Protectorate, with Mutesa himself demanding that Buganda be separated from the rest of the protectorate of Uganda and transferred to Foreign Office jurisdiction. Governor Cohen's response was to depose and exile the Kabaka on 30 November, creating massive protests among the Baganda. Mutesa's forced departure, carried out by Wing Commander Clive Beadon, made him a martyr in the eyes of the Baganda, whose latent separatism set off a storm of protest. Cohen could find no one among the Baganda willing and able to mobilise support for his schemes. After two years of unrelenting Ganda hostility and obstruction, Cohen was forced to reinstate "Kabaka Freddie", who returned to Kampala on 17 October 1955 under a negotiated settlement which made him a constitutional monarch and gave the Baganda the right to elect representatives to the kingdom's parliament, the Lukiiko. Mutesa's standing up to Cohen greatly boosted his popularity in the kingdom.

In 1962, Uganda became independent from Britain under the leadership of Milton Obote as Prime Minister of Uganda. Under the country's new constitution, the Kingdom of Buganda became a semi-autonomous part of a new Ugandan federation. The federal Prime Minister was Obote, the leader of the Uganda People's Congress (UPC), which entered a governing coalition with the dominant Buganda regional party, Kabaka Yekka. The post of Governor-General of Uganda was abolished with the attainment of republican status and replaced by a non-executive President.

Obote and the UPC reached a deal with Mutesa to support his election to the Presidency of Uganda. In a session of Parliament on 4 October 1963, Mutesa was elected President via secret ballot with the support of over two thirds of the members.

In 1964, the coalition between Mutesa and Obote's parties collapsed over the imposition, against Mutesa's will, of a referendum to decide the fate of two "lost counties". Residents of the two counties voted overwhelmingly in favour of their return from Buganda to Bunyoro. In 1966, Mutesa's estrangement from Obote merged with another crisis. Obote faced a possible removal from office by factional infighting within his own party. He had the other four leading members of his party arrested and detained, and then suspended the federal constitution and declared himself President of Uganda in February 1966, deposing Mutesa. The Buganda regional Parliament passed a resolution in May 1966 declaring that de jure Buganda's incorporation into Uganda had ended with the suspension of the constitution and requesting the federal government to vacate the capital city, which was in Buganda. Obote responded with an armed attack upon the Kabaka's palace, sending Mutesa into exile to Burundi and after brief stays in Nairobi and Addis Ababa he was given asylum in the United Kingdom and in 1967 a new constitution abolished all of Uganda's kingdoms, including Buganda.

== Exile ==
While in exile, Mutesa wrote an autobiography, The Desecration of My Kingdom.

Mutesa died of alcohol poisoning in his London flat, No. 28 Orchard House in Rotherhithe, in 1969. Identified by the Metropolitan Police as suicide, the death has been viewed as assassination by those who claim Mutesa may have been force-fed vodka by agents of the Obote regime. Mutesa was interviewed in his flat only a few hours before his death by the British journalist John Simpson, who found that he was sober and in good spirits. Simpson reported this to the police the following day on hearing of Mutesa's death, but this line of inquiry was not pursued.

After Mutesa's body had been embalmed by Desmond Henley, it was provisionally interred in a vault in the catacombs of St Mary's Roman Catholic Church in Kensal Green Cemetery, West London on Wednesday 3 December 1969. This was after a requiem service that was held at Wellington Barracks Chapel. It was attended by Democratic Party (DP) leader, Ben Kiwanuka, Bishop Adrian Kivumbi Ddungu of Masaka Diocese and Monsignor Anatoli Kamya who represented Kampala Archdiocese. The requiem service was jointly conducted by Bishop C.E Stuart, John Taylor and Rev. S.J Davies. His body was finally repatriated back to Uganda in 1971 after the overthrow of Obote and given a state funeral at Kasubi Nabulagala. The president who ordered the state funeral was Idi Amin, who as army commander had led the assault on Mutesa's palace in 1966. It is said by many accounts that while in exile in London, "King Freddie" was both financially strapped and lost.

1. Nnaabakyala Damali Catherine Nnakawombe, the Nnabagereka, daughter of Christopher Kisosonkole of the Nkima clan. Wedding on 19 November 1948 at St. Paul's Cathedral Namirembe.
2. Lady Edith Kasozi
3. Omubiitokati (Princess) Beatrice Kabasweka, a Mutoro from Toro.
4. Lady Kate Ndagire. Married in 1950
5. Nnaabakyala Sarah Nalule, Omuzaana Kabejja, sister of the Nnabagereka, and daughter of Christopher Kisosonkole of the Nkima clan. Married in 1954.
6. Lady Nalwooga. She died in 2003.
7. Lady Nesta M. Rugumayo, a Mutoro, from Toro
8. Lady Kaakako Rwanchwende, a Munyankole princess from Ankole.
9. Lady Winifred Keihangwe, a Munyankole princess from Ankole. She was imprisoned by Milton Obote and released only shortly before going into labour, in 1966.
10. Lady Zibiah Wangari Ngatho, a Kikuyu, from Nairobi, Kenya.
11. Lady Catherine Karungu, a Munyankole princess from Ankole
12. Lady Naome Nanyonga, of Nsenene clan from Masaka Buddu. Naome Nanyonga was a midwife and is the founder of Sunga Maternity Hospital. She died in 2006.
13. Lady Margaret Nakato of Nkumba, Busiro County.

== Issue ==
Mutesa is recorded to have fathered at least 14 sons and 9 daughters:

1. Prince Kiweewa Luswata. The first son of Kabaka Muteesa II. He was born in Wakiso. He lived and studied in France. He died in the early 1990s and was buried at Kasubi Tombs, Nabulagala.
2. Prince Robert Masamba Kimera, whose mother was Nesta M. Rugumayo. He was born in Kampala in 1950. He was educated at St. Mary's College Kisubi, and King's College Budo and in Canada. He worked as a geologist with the Swaziland Department of Geology between 1980 and 1983. He was a lecturer at the Nakawa Vocational School from 1991 until 1992. In 1993, he settled in Canada.
3. Prince (Omulangira) David Francis Ssuuna Kayima Ssezzibwa. Was born in Kitovu, Masaka. His mother was Muzaana Mary Nabweteme of the Lungfish (Mmamba) clan. He was a teacher and a psychologist. Died in Denmark and was interred in Bugembe royal tombs in Wakiso.
4. Kabaka Ronald Muwenda Mutebi II, the current Kabaka of Buganda, whose mother was Sarah Nalule.
5. Prince (Omulangira) Frederick Wampamba Ssuuna, whose mother was Edith Kasozi. He was a Pilot and Commissioned Officer in the Ugandan Air Force. It’s alleged that he was assassinated on the orders of Idi Amin at Bombo in 1972. He is buried at the Kasubi Tombs in Nabulagala.
6. Prince (Omulangira) Henry Kalemeera, whose mother was Damali Nnakawombe. He was educated at King's College, Buddo and Addis Ababa University, Ethiopia. He is an aeronautical engineer. He settled in the United States. Worked or still works as a flight engineer with American Airlines.
7. Prince (Omulangira) George Michael Ndawula, whose mother was Muzaana Nalwoga.
8. Prince (Omulangira) Joseph Ndawula, whose mother was Muzaana Nzera Nabakooza. He has worked with the foreign services and still serves as Uganda's High Commissioner to Namibia
9. Prince (Omulangira) Richard Walugembe Bamweyana, whose mother was Sarah Nalule. He was born in 1956, educated at Achimota School, Ghana, and worked in the fashion and advertising industries. He died in the 2000s. He was buried at Kasubi Tombs in Nabulagala.
10. Prince (Omulangira) Katabaazi Mukarukidi, whose mother was Damali Nnakawombe. He is an airline pilot in Nigeria.
11. Prince (Omulangira) Patrick Nakibinge, whose mother was Sarah Nalule. He died in the 2000s and is buried at Kasubi Tombs in Nabulagala.
12. Prince (Omulangira) Daudi Golooba. He was educated at King's College Budo and Makerere University. He is an accountant. He is a founding member and chairman of the Buganda Heritage Association of the United Kingdom (UK) and Ireland (founded in 1998). He settled in the UK.
13. Prince (Omulangira) Herbert Kateregga, whose mother was Kaakako Rwanchwende. He settled in the UK.
14. Prince (Omulangira) Fredrick Mawanda Mutebi. He was born in 1965 to Muzaana Specioza Namagembe. He died and was interred in Bugembegembe royal tombs in Wakiso district.
15. Prince (Omulangira) Daudi Kintu Wasajja, whose mother was Winifred Keihangwe. He was born in Kampala in May 1966, after his father had left Uganda. He was educated at the University of Nottingham in the UK, graduating with a Bachelor of Arts. He worked as an executive underwriter for Pan World Insurance Company and as a regional retail manager for Celtel (Uganda) Limited (now Airtel Uganda Limited). He is a member of Buganda Land Board, Kabira Country Club, Hash Harriers Athletic Club, and others. Lives in Kampala.
16. Princess (Omumbejja) Dorothy Kabonesa Naamukaabya Nassolo, whose mother was Damali Nakawombe. She was born at the Mengo Palace in 1951. She is a graduate of the University of Nairobi. Lives in Kampala.
17. Princess (Omumbejja) Dina Kigga Mukarukidi, whose mother was Beatrice Kabasweka. She works at the headquarters of the African Union in Addis Ababa, Ethiopia.
18. Princess (Omumbejja) Anne Sarah Kagere Nandawula, whose mother is Kate Ndagire. Born at Mengo in 1951.
19. Princess (Omumbejja) Catherine Agnes Nabaloga, whose mother was Kate Ndagire. She was installed as the Lubuga at the coronation of her brother Kabaka Ronald Muwenda Mutebi II, the thirty-sixth Kabaka of Buganda, who has reigned since 1993. Princess Nabaloga is the patron of Buganda Heritage Association in Denmark, founded in 1998. She holds a Doctor of Philosophy degree in linguistics.
20. Princess (Omumbejja) Alice Mpologoma Zaalwango, whose mother was Edith Kasozi. She was born in 1961. She was educated at Gayaza Junior School, Kibuli Secondary School, and Makerere University. She died in Pretoria, South Africa from breast cancer on 23 March 2005. She is buried at Kasubi.
21. Princess (Omumbejja) Stella Alexandria Sserwamutanda Ndagire. Born in Nairobi, Kenya. Her mother was Zibiah Wangari Ngatho, a Kikuyu. She was raised in Kampala and Nairobi. Settled in Atlanta, Georgia, U.S.
22. Princess (Omumbejja) Jane Mpologoma Nabanakulya. Born in Sunga Village, Buyaga County, Bunyoro-Kitara Kingdom, on 12 April 1964. Omuzaana Naome Nanyonga was her mother. In 2003, she moved to London, England, where she lives with her husband David Segawa Mukasa.
23. Princess (Omumbejja) Gertrude Christine Naabanaakulya Tebattagwabwe. Was born at Mengo Hospital on 20 August 1964. Her mother is Margaret Nakato of Nkumba, Busiro County. Grew up in Uganda until the age of nine, when she relocated to London, England. Studied to become an accountant. Moved back to Uganda in May 2013.
24. Princess Diana Balizzamuggale Teyeggala. She is the youngest of Mutesa's children. She was born in Kampala in October 1966, after her father had gone into exile. Her mother is Catherine Karungu, an Ankole princess. Teyeggala never saw her father alive. After a period of illness she died on 20 December 2025. She is buried at the Kasubi Tombs and used to reside in Kampala.

== See also ==
- History of Uganda
- List of unsolved deaths
- Political parties of Uganda
- Politics of Uganda
- List of Kings of Buganda (Kabaka ne BaSsekabaka ba Buganda)

Preceded by Daudi Chwa II	Kabaka of Buganda; 22 November 1939 – 21 November 1969	Vacant Title next held by Ronald Muwenda Mutebi II
Preceded by Elizabeth II as Queen of Uganda	President of Uganda; 9 October 1963 – 2 March 1966	Succeeded by Milton Obote
