= Nesta Rugumayo =

Ugandan physician and royal family member

- Lady Nesta M. Rugumayo
- Born: Kingdom of Tooro
- Died: 1971
- Issue: Prince Robert Masamba Kimera

Nesta Rugumayo (died 1971) was a Ugandan nutritionist and community developer. She was the mother of Prince Robert Masamba Kimera with Mutesa II, the 35th Kabaka of Buganda. She later married Edward Rugumayo.

== Early life ==
She was born Nesta Mukeri in the Kingdom of Tooro. She was a Mutooro.

== Education and career ==
In 1962, the Associated Country Women of the World (ACWW) awarded her the first Lady Aberdeen Scholarship. She spent a year at the London School of Hygiene and Tropical Medicine. In London, she began a lifelong friendship with Irene Spry, who shared her commitment to development.

Upon her return to Uganda, she worked for the Ministry of Community Development to increase awareness among women in rural communities about the nutritional needs of children. She was fully engaged in Uganda's development.”

== Death ==
Rugumayo died in 1971.

== Bibliography ==
- Stewart, Beth (2008). Gender and the difficulty of decolonizing development in Africa in the late 1960s and early 1970s: a Canadian effort for partnership among women. Canada; Toronto; London: University of British Columbia. ISBN 978-0-670-03807-7.
