= Jane Mpologoma Nabanakulya =

Ugandan princess

Princess Mpologoma
- Born: Jane Mpologoma Nabanakulya; April 12, 1964 (age 62); Sunga Village, Buyaga County, Bunyoro-Kitara Kingdom
- Spouse: David Segawa Mukasa
- Father: Mutesa II of Buganda
- Mother: Naome Nanyonga
- Occupation: Nurse, pastor

Princess Jane Mpologoma Nabanakulya is a daughter of Uganda's first President Mutesa II of Buganda. She was born in Sunga Village, Buyaga County, Bunyoro-Kitara Kingdom, on April 12, 1964 by Omuzaana Naome Nanyonga, a midwife of Major General Sir Mutesa II of Buganda.

== Early life ==
Princess Mpologoma grew up with her mother throughout her childhood and she never saw her father, although she was regularly visited by Prince Juuko Walugembe of Bugerere. She was also taken care of by Arafayiri Musoke, a well known farmer in Sunga and an old friend of the late Kabaka of Buganda.

== Education ==
Princess Mopologoma attended Aga Khan Primary School in Kampala and later on she joined Ngora Nursing School in Ngora, Teso sub-region, in Eastern Uganda. She relocated to Athens, Greece, where she continued her studies in nursing. Later, she moved to Stockholm, Sweden. In 2003 she moved to London, United Kingdom, where she lives with her husband, Duke David Segawa Mukasa. They are now co-pastors a Manmin Church in Bethnal Green, London.
