= Prosperous and Safe Aceh Party =

Prosperous and Safe Aceh Party Partai Aceh Aman Sejahtera
- Chairman: Ghazali Abbas Adan
- Secretary-General: Nusri Hamid
- Founded: 3 June 2007
- Headquarters: Banda Aceh
- Ideology: Aceh regionalism Pacifism
- DPR seats: 0

The Prosperous and Safe Aceh Party (Indonesian: Partai Aceh Aman Sejahtera) is a regional political party in Indonesia. It contested the 2009 elections in the province of Aceh. The party is led by singer and poet, and former legislature member Ghazali Abbas, a former United Development Party member of the People's Representative Council. The party's electoral target in 2009 was eight seats, one from each voting district in Aceh. However, the party garnered only 11,117 votes, 0.52 percent of the total turnout in Aceh. It failed to gain any seats in the local legislature and did not qualify to contest the 2014 elections.
