= Order of the Shield and Spears =

Buganda award

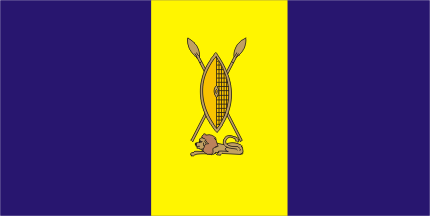
- The Bugandan Flag
- Type: Order
- Awarded for: Valuable services to Buganda.
- Country: Buganda
- Presented by: Kabaka of Buganda
- Established: 1927
- Ribbon

The Order of the Shield and Spears (Ekitiibwa ky'Amafumu n'Engabo) is the Kingdom of Buganda's highest honour. It was established by Daudi Cwa II of Buganda, Kabaka of the Buganda, for the purpose of recognizing excellent service to the kingdom. It is awarded annually by the Kabaka of Buganda.

== History ==
The Order of the Shields and Spears was established on 8 August 1927 by Daudi Cwa II of Buganda, Kabaka of the Buganda, for the purpose of recognizing excellent service to the kingdom. The order's medals was created on 26 May 1937.

It is awarded to Bugandan subjects and foreign nationals.

== Classes ==
The order consists of the following classes of merit:

- Commander – CSS
- Officer or Omutongole – OSS
- Member or Omukungu – MSS

== Notable recipients ==
- Sir Apolo Kagwa, KCMG MBE
- Serwano Kulubya
- Martin Luther Nsibirwa
- Joseph Mulwanyamuli Ssemwogerere
- Godfrey Kaaya Kavuma
- Prince Daniel Steven Kimbugwe
- John Ssebaana Kizito
- Jen Sebiri Mulwana
- Rosalia Kyoteka
- Yvonne Namaganda
- Cardinal Emmanuel Nsubuga
- Prince Badru Mbuga Kakungulu
- Bishop Dustan Nsubuga
- Rev. Polycarp Kakooza
- Joyce Mpanga
- Christopher Sebadduka
- George Kakoma
- Major Joash Katende
- Capt. George Maalo
- Michael B. Nsimbi
- Joseph Musoke
- Balaki Kirya
- Capt. Ronald Owen
- Major Richard Carr-Gomm
- Martin Flegg

== See also ==
- Kingdom of Buganda
- Kabaka of Buganda
- Daudi Cwa II of Buganda
