= Buddo hill =

Buddo
- Map of Uganda showing the location of Buddo
- Coordinates: 00°15′22″N 32°29′10″E
- Country: Uganda
- Region: Central Uganda
- District: Wakiso District
- County: Busiro
- Elevation: 1,300 m (4,300 ft)
- Time zone: UTC+3 (EAT)

Buddo, sometimes spelled as Budo, is a hill in Wakiso District, Central Uganda. Phonetically, Buddo is the correct spelling in Luganda, the native language of the local area.

== Location ==
Buddo is located in Busiro County, Wakiso District, off of the Kampala-Masaka Highway, approximately 14 kilometres (8.7 mi) by road southwest of Kampala, Uganda's capital and largest city.

== Overview. ==
With a peak at 1,300 metres (4,300 ft) above sea level, Buddo is an important hill in the environs of Kampala. It carries cultural and academic significance. The cultural coronation site, where the Kabaka of Buganda is enthroned in a traditional ceremony is located on Buddo Hill and is known as Naggalabi Buddo.In August 2023 was the reopening of the Kasubi Tombs, a UNESCO World Heritage site, following their restoration after a fire in 2010. The hill is also the location of several elementary, middle and high schools, including Kings College Budo, a prestigious mixed boarding high school, attended by Buganda's Kings starting with Captain Sir Daudi Chwa II, the thirty-fourth (34th) Kabaka of the Kingdom of Buganda, who reigned between 1897 and 1939.

== Landmarks ==
Buddo contains the following landmarks:

- Kings College Budo - A prestigious mixed boarding high school
- Budo junior school
- Budo Senior Secondary School - A mixed non-residential high school
- Kisozi High School Buddo
- Naggalabi Buddo - The site where the Kabaka of Buganda is enthroned in a traditional ceremony.
- Matutu Memorial Primary School
- St. Jude Primary School
- St Francis Junior School Buddo
- Abatec Islamic School

== See also ==
- Wakiso District
- Kings College Budo
- Kingdom of Buganda
- Central Region, Uganda
