= Kasanje, Uganda =

Kasanje
- Map of Uganda showing the location of Kasanje
- Coordinates: 00°15′54″S 31°45′54″E
- Country: Uganda
- Region: Central Uganda
- District: Kalungu District
- Elevation: 1,280 m (4,200 ft)
- Time zone: UTC+3 (EAT)

Kasanje is a location in Central Uganda.

== Location ==
Kasanje is located in Kalungu District, Central Uganda. It lies approximately 10 kilometres (6.2 mi), by road, northeast of Masaka, the nearest large city. This location lies approximately 14 kilometres (8.7 mi), by road, south of Kalungu, where the district headquarters are located. The coordinates of Kasanje are:00 15 54S, 31 45 54E (Latitude:-0.2650; Longitude:31.7650).

== Landmarks ==
Some of the landmarks near Kasanje include the following:

- Kalungu Health Center III - A public health center, administered by Kalungu District Administration, lies approximately 2 kilometres (1.2 mi), by road, west of Kasanje.

== See also ==
- Kalungu (Uganda)
- Kalungu District
- Lake Victoria
- Central Region, Uganda
- Katonga River
- Hospitals in Uganda
