= Sylvia Nagginda Luswata =

Queen of Buganda Kingdom since 1999

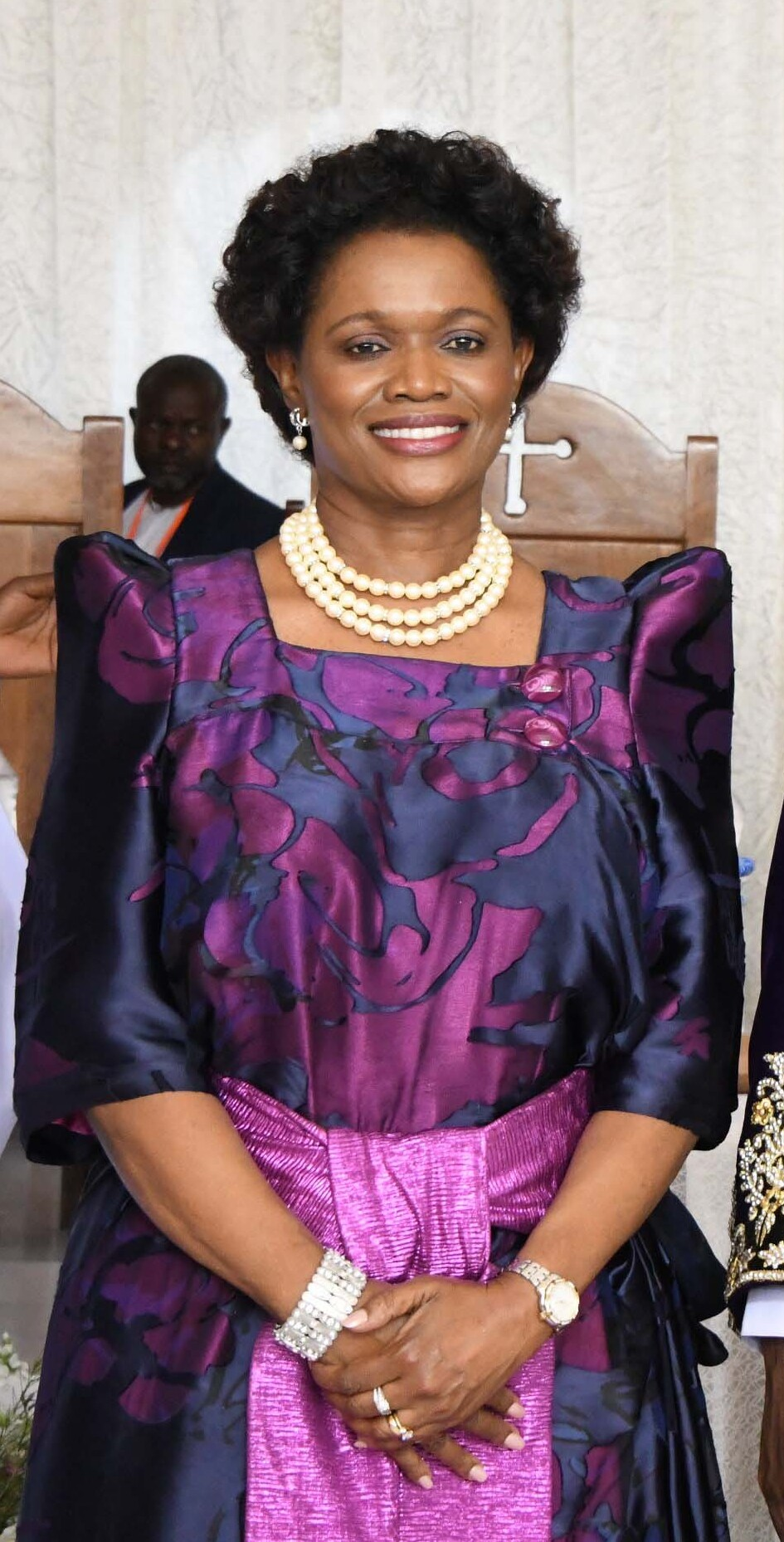

Nnaabagereka of Buganda
- Tenure: 27 August 1999 – present
- Born: Sylvia Nagginda Luswata; 9 November 1962 (age 63); London, United Kingdom
- Spouse: Ronald Muwenda Mutebi II
- Issue: Katrina Ssangalyambogo (b. 2001)
- House: Abalasangeye dynasty (by marriage)
- Father: John Mulumba Luswata
- Mother: Rebecca Nakintu Musoke
- Religion: Anglican

Sylvia Nagginda Luswata (born 9 November 1962) is the Nnaabagereka or queen consort of the Kingdom of Buganda as the official wife of Ronald Muwenda Mutebi II.

== Background ==
Nagginda was born in England in 1962 to John Mulumba Luswata of Nkumba, Entebbe and Rebecca Nakintu Musoke and returned to Uganda shortly thereafter to be raised by her grandparents of the Omusu clan. She is the granddaughter of George William Musoke and Nora Musoke of Nnazigo, Kyaggwe, and Omutaka Nelson Nkalubo Sebugwawo and Catherine Sebugwawo of Nkumba. She has three brothers and three sisters. Born in the United Kingdom and raised in Uganda, she lived in the United Kingdom for several years before marrying Kabaka Ronald Muwenda Mutebi II in a historical ceremony on August 27, 1999 at St. Paul's Cathedral, Namirembe.

== Education ==
Sylvia attended Lake Victoria Primary School, in Entebbe, Gayaza Junior School, and Wanyange Girls School. After completing her secondary school, she went to the United States to continue her studies. She earned an associate degree with honors from LaGuardia Community College of the City University of New York, a Bachelor of Arts degree from New York University, and a Master of Arts degree with Distinction in Mass Communication from the New York Institute of Technology.

Her major field of study was public relations, including economics, journalism and corporate communication.

== Work experience ==
Sylvia has worked as a Public Information Officer and Research Consultant at the United Nations headquarters in New York, as a proposal writer with Maximus Inc., and as an independent consultant in public relations and business development with various firms. She has worked in the fields of public information, economic research, health care and human services, and international non-profit activities. She is one of the founders of the African Queens and Women Cultural Leaders Network, whose primary focus is the "improvement of the lives of women and children in Africa". Collaborating organizations include the African Union, the United Nations, and African governments.

=== Education advocacy ===
Sylvia supports the Kabaka's Education Fund in assisting to make education available to the least advantaged children through a scholarship scheme. She stresses the need for high quality education accessible to all children and relevant to the needs of society. She places special emphasis on the education of girls, as witnessed through her work as a Goodwill Ambassador for United Nations Population Fund, advocating for girls' education. She is also involved in the Forum for African Women Educationalists an organization whose goal is to accelerate female participation in education and to bridge the gender gap within the education system at all levels. She is cautious about the cultural values that make a good mother or woman in Buganda, but stresses that these should be handled in such a way that girls are not denied any opportunity in education.

=== Social activism ===
As Queen, Sylvia has worked to raise awareness of the value of educating girls. She endorses abstinence from premarital sex to avoid HIV/AIDS and has tried to reduce the stigma of those living with the disease. The Queen is the patron of various organizations and heads the Nnaabagereka Development Trust Foundation. She has also spearheaded immunization campaigns against measles, polio, tetanus, and other diseases. She also established the Kampala Ballet and Modern Dance School, the first of its kind in Uganda.

=== Ekisakaate camp (Royal enclosure) ===
Through her Nabagereka Foundation, Nagginda's Ekisakaate summer camp has served more than 30,000 Ugandan youth since 2007. The camp takes place every January and admits youth between 6 and 18 years. "Ekisakaate kya Nabagereka" meaning the queen's camp, emphasizes Buganda culture. Teenagers are taught skills including peeling matooke, greeting in Buganda culture, and dancing the kiganda dance. Mentors are also called upon to address the teenagers who look up to them. Jennifer Musisi, Robert Kyagulanyi Ssentamu, Juliana Kanyomozi are among some of the mentors to grace the ekisakaate camp in recent times.

== Personal life ==
After living in the United States for 18 years, Sylvia returned to Uganda. In 1998, she became romantically involved with her long-time acquaintance Muwenda Mutebi II of Buganda. Their engagement was announced on 14 February 1999. On 27 August of that year, she married Muwenda at St. Paul's Cathedral on Namirembe Hill, becoming the first queen of Buganda in fifty years. On 4 July 2001 in London, she delivered her first child, Princess Katrina Sarah Ssangalyambogo, whose name means "buffalo's horn". She is the step-mother to the King's other children.

On 23 March 2023, Queen Sylvia released her autobiography, The Nnaabagereka Queen Sylvia Nagginda Luswata, at Sheraton Hotel in Kampala.

== Achievements and recognitions ==
Achievements and recognitions
Roles	Organizations and institutions
Ambassador	Goodwill Ambassador of the United Nations Population Fund in Uganda (UNFPA); Torch Bearer for the Millennium Development Goals-MDG3; Ambassador for Mama Club – an organisation for mothers living with HIV/AIDS; Campaign to End Paediatric HIV/AIDS in Uganda and Special Olympics Uganda.
Patron	Hospice Africa Uganda; ChildFund International Uganda; Female Sponsorship Foundation, Makerere University Uganda; Programme for Accessible Health Communication and Education (PACE) and Conservation Through Public Health (CTPH); Buganda Kingdom Tourism Board.
Awards	Exemplary contribution in promoting culture as a human right and development tool in the country by Ford Foundation.; Honorary membership of the Paul Harris Fellowship by Rotary Club.

== See also ==
- Elizabeth Bagaya
- Ekisaakaate
- Kabaka of Buganda
