= Nnaabagereka of Buganda =

Queen consort of Buganda

The Nnaabagereka is the official title of the queen consort of the Kingdom of Buganda, a traditional kingdom in modern-day Uganda. The current Nnaabagereka is Sylvia Nagginda, who married Kabaka Muwenda Mutebi II of Buganda on 27 August 1999.

== History ==
This title is a relatively recent one, created in the 20th century. Previously, Buganda tradition had only the King's mother (the Nnamasole, "queen mother") and one of his sisters (the Lubuga, or "queen sister") as nationally preeminent and powerful. The Nnamasole and the Lubuga each had their respective compounds in the Royal Palace, and the degree of political dominance and influence each held varied from reign to reign. The King's principal wife was meanwhile referred to as the Kaddulubaale, the same title held by the principal wife in any household in the kingdom.

King Daudi Chwa II (reigned 1899-1939) was the first king whose wife, Irene Nnamaganda, was considered to be foremost among Buganda women. The title Nnabagereka—originally a girl's name from the Mushroom clan—was chosen as the title of the most pre-eminent woman in the Kingdom.

== Currently ==
The current Nnabagereka is a champion of human rights, women's rights and the rights of children, especially the girl child. She is an admired role model in Buganda, where she is referred to as "Maama wa Buganda", meaning "Mother of the Buganda Nation". Recently she has been a vocal supporter of better working conditions for government teachers ad health workers.

She is the first Nnabagereka in the history of the kingdom to set up a fully fledged office. In 2000, she established the Nnabagereka Development Foundation (NDF). The Foundation is a charitable non-government organization, whose mission is to restore the vitality of Buganda and Uganda at large by "marshaling community and household human resources for social and economic development". The Foundation has also partnered with the Alur Kingdom to also help restore neighboring kingdoms.

== See also ==
- Buganda kingdom
- Kabaka of Buganda
- Sylvia Najinda
- Inhebantu of Busoga
