= Daudi Cwa II of Buganda =

Daudi Cwa II
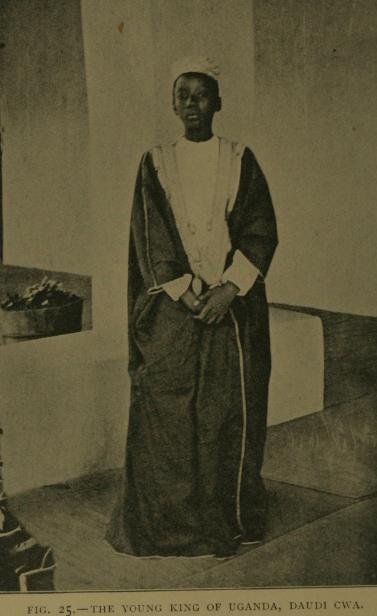
- 1911 portrait

Kabaka of Buganda
- Reign: 1897–1939
- Coronation: 1897
- Predecessor: Mwanga II of Buganda
- Successor: Muteesa II of Buganda
- Born: 8 August 1896; Mengo, Uganda Protectorate
- Died: 22 November 1939 (aged 43); Salaama, Uganda
- Burial: Kasubi Nabulagala
- Issue: Muteesa II; Alexander David Ssimbwa
- House: Abalasangeye dynasty
- Father: Mwanga II of Buganda
- Mother: Abakyala Evalini Kulabako

Daudi Cwa II was the 34th Kabaka of the Kingdom of Buganda who ruled from 1897, when he was an infant, until his death in 1939.

He ascended to the throne as an infant following the deposition and exile of his Father Mwanga II, by the british colonial authorities.

== Life ==
He was born on 8 August 1896, at Mengo Palace. He was the fifth son of Kabaka Danieri Basammula-Ekkere Mwanga II Mukasa, Kabaka of Buganda, between 1884 and 1888 and between 1889 and 1897. His mother was Abakyala Evalini Kulabako, of the Ngabi clan, the fourth of his father's sixteen wives.

Following the exile of his father by the British colonial authorities after the Anglo-Buganda war, he ascended to the throne in August 1897. At the time of his coronation, he was only one year old. During this early age, Buganda was governed by regents who administered the kingdom on his behalf. He maintained his capital at Mengo Hill. He was educated at Kings College Budo, which was founded in 1906 alongside Daudi, by the British Commissioner and commander in chief of the then Uganda protectorate, George Wilson.

On 8 August 1914, he received an honorary commission as a lieutenant in the British Army, and was appointed an honorary captain on 22 September 1917. He was appointed an honorary Companion of the Order of St. Michael and St. George (CMG) in the 1918 New Year Honours, and was promoted to honorary Knight Commander (KCMG) on 16 February 1925. He was further appointed an honorary Knight Commander of the Order of the British Empire (KBE) in the 1937 Coronation Honours. He was also decorated as a Commander of the Order of the Crown of Belgium in 1918.

== Issue ==
He is recorded to have fathered 36 children; 20 sons and 16 daughters:

| Name | Birth |
|---|---|
| 1. Eva Irini Alice Zalwango | 15 December 1915 |
| 2. Uniya Mary Namaalwa | 28 August 1916 |
| 3. Airini Dulusira Nga'nda Ndagire | 31 October 1916 |
| 4. Kasalina Nnaamukaabya Nassimbwa | 11 November 1918 |
| 5. George William Mawanda | 10 January 1919 |
| 6. Kasalina Gertrude Tebattagwabwe Nnaabanaakulya | 30 June 1919 |
| 7. Margret Julian Lwantale | 13 June 1920 |
| 8. Victoria Beatrice Namikka Mpologoma Kamuwanda | 21 October 1920 |
| 9. Frederick Robert Sekamaanya Kayondo | 17 November 1920 |
| 10. Edisa Manjeri Namirembe Nabweteme | 19 December 1920 |
| 11. Edward William David Walugembe Mukaabya Kimbugwe | 22 March 1921 |
| 12. Alikizandereya Mary Balikanda Nakamaanya | 11 July 1921 |
| 13. Albert Victor Wasajja Lumansi | 17 July 1924 |
| 14. Victoria Alice Mary Nakalema Nalwoga | 21 July 1924 |
| 15. Edward Fredrick David William Muteesa Walugembe | 19 November 1924 |
| 16. Eva Irini Nacwa | 24 March 1925 |
| 17. Henry Wasswa Kalemeera | 8 April 1925 |
| 18. Alfredi Kato Kiggala | 8 April 1925 |
| 19. Sepiriya Danieri Luswata | 20 May 1925 |
| 20. Richard Lumaama | 26 September 1925 |
| 21. James Sekannyo Mutebi | 4 November 1925 |
| 22. Elizabeti Nakabiri Lwamuganwa | 11 June 1926 |
| 23. Danieri Mwanga Basammula | 25 February 1927 |
| 24. Bowadisiya Nkinzi | 10 March 1927 |
| 25. Harold Kagolo Kimera | 7 July 1927 |
| 26. Ibulaimu Lincoln Ndawula | |
| 27. Jeludini Nakayenga | January 1928 |
| 28. Agusiteni Tebandeke | 23 April 1928 |
| 29. Juliyani Muggale | 8 June 1928 |
| 30. Yusufu Suuna Lulambulankola | 28 December 1928 |
| 31. John Christian Lukanga | 1 August 1929 |
| 32. Onesifulo Jjuuko | 9 May 1930 |
| 33. Egbat Kamaanya | 25 May 1930 |
| 34. Mulondo | 14 February 1934 |
| 35. Alexander Ssimbwa | 21 March 1934 |
| 36. Esteri Mazzi | 22 February 1935 |

Some of the more notable of those children are:

- Kabaka Sir Edward Frederick William David Walugembe Luwangula Mutebi Mutesa II, the 35th Kabaka of Buganda, whose mother was Lady Irene Drusilla Namaganda of the Nte (Cow) clan. He was the first President of the Republic of Uganda
- Princess (Omumbejja) Victoria Beatrice Namikka Kamuwanda Mpologoma, whose mother was Abisaagi Nabunnya. Princess Mpologoma was born in Kampala, on 21 October 1920. She was installed as Naalinnya to her brother Sir Edward Muteesa II, at Kasubi in December 1953. She received the Order of the Shield and Spears.
- Princess (Omumbejja) Irene Drusilla Ndagire, whose mother was Rebeka Nalunkuuma. She was born at Lubaga on 31 October 1916. She was educated at Gayaza High School and at Buloba College. She served as President of the Luganda Society, from 1953 until 1963.
- Princess (Omumbejja) Alice Evelyn Zaalwango, whose mother was Miriya Nalule. She was born on 6 December 1915. She was installed as Naalinnya to her brother, Sir Edward Muteesa II, at Kasubi in November 1939. She died of shock on hearing that the British had exiled the Kabaka on 30 November 1953. She was awarded the medal of Order of the Shield and Spears.
- Princess (Omumbejja) Margaret Juliana Lwantale, whose mother was Irene Namaganda. She was born in Kampala on 13 June 1920. She was installed as Nassolo to her brother Sir Edward Muteesa II, at Kasubi.
- Prince (Omulangira) Alexander David Ssimbwa, whose mother was Erina Nambawa. He was born in Kampala on 21 March 1934. He was arrested, imprisoned and tortured by troops loyal to Obote, following his coup d'état in 1966. Prince Ssimbwa was sentenced to 64 years imprisonment for allegedly plotting Obote's assassination. Joined the liberation struggle led by Yoweri Museveni.
- Prince (Omulangira) Henry Harold Kimera (7 July 1927 – 15 January 1993) was a notable member of the Buganda royal family and a son of Kabaka Sir Daudi Chwa II. Following his death in London, his remains were returned to Uganda and interred at the Kasubi Royal Tombs. Kabaka Edward Muteesa II named him as the third successor to the Buganda throne in his will, underscoring Kimera’s importance in the kingdom’s hierarchy. Educated at King’s College, Budo, Bristol University (LLB), and Lincoln’s Inn, he became a Barrister-at-Law. He also served as a Pilot Officer in the RAF, later promoted to Honorary Flying Officer in 1953. From 1963 to 1967, he worked as Public Relations Officer for the Uganda Development Corporation. His accolades include the Order of the Shield and Spears and the Queen Elizabeth II Coronation Medal (1953). His children include: Prince Andrew Christian Sekamanya Kimera, Prince James Kitamirike Lukanga, Prince Daudi Muwenda Kimera, Prince Feizal Kimera, Prince Henry Kalemera Kimera, Princess Barbara Lwantale Kimera, Princess Jasmine Naluwembe Kimera, Princess Farida Nanchwa Dembe Kimera, Princess Nakiggala and Princess Nalumansi

For more details, refer to Buganda’s royal history archives at Buganda Family History.

== The final years ==
He died at his palace at Salaama, a suburb of Kampala, on 22 November 1939 at the age of 43 years. He was buried at Kasubi Nabulagala, the third Kabaka to be buried there.

== See also ==
- Buganda
- Kabaka of Buganda

| Preceded by Danieri Basammula-Ekkere Mwanga II Mukasa | King of Buganda; 1897–1939 | Succeeded by Sir Edward Muteesa II |
