= Ancelma Perlacios =

Bolivian politician (born 1964)

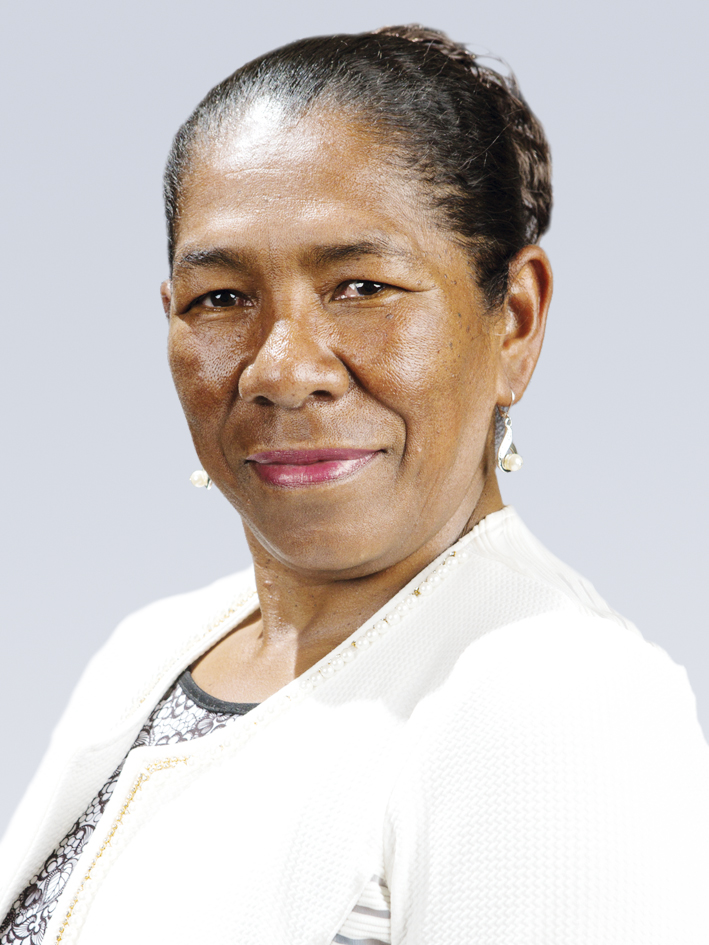
- Official portrait, 2018

Senator for La Paz
- In office 18 January 2015 – 3 November 2020
- Substitute: Giovani Carlo
- Preceded by: Fidel Surco
- Succeeded by: Cecilia Requena

Personal details
- Born: Ancelma Perlacios Peralta; 26 July 1964 (age 60); Chicaloma, La Paz, Bolivia
- Political party: Movement for Socialism
- Occupation: Politician; trade unionist

Ancelma Perlacios Peralta (born 26 July 1964) is a Bolivian cocalera activist, politician, and trade unionist who served as senator for La Paz from 2015 to 2020.

Born in the rural community of Chicaloma, Perlacios ascended the ranks of women's union leadership throughout the mid-2000s and early 2010s, starting at the local and later municipal levels before reaching the national level as part of the Bartolina Sisa Confederation. Her membership there facilitated her inclusion on the Movement for Socialism's 2014 electoral list, through which she was elected to the Senate.

Perlacios was the first-ever Afro-Bolivian to serve in the Senate. She shares, together with Andrea Bonilla, the distinction of being one of the first two Afro-Bolivian women in parliament, and is one of just three overall, after Jorge Medina. Perlacios's tenure coincided with rising conflict between her party and the Yungas-based cocaleros she represented, in which she ultimately sided with the former. She was not nominated for reelection.

== Early life and career ==
Ancelma Perlacios was born on 26 July 1964 in Chicaloma, a rural community situated in the tropical foothills of La Paz's Sud Yungas Province. She completed portions of her primary schooling in her hometown up to the seventh grade but dropped out before advancing further. Her situation reflected a common fact of life for many women in rural agrarian areas of the country, where high school attendance, much less graduation, was often infrequent, even into the second half of the twentieth century.

Perlacios became active in community organizing relatively late in life, not participating in grassroots movements until the mid-2000s, when she was already in her early forties. Her first roles were in the La Joya Community, where she served as secretary of finance from 2004 to 2006. She later held the same post in the Chicaloma Women's Center from 2006 to 2008. Perlacios's rise through the ranks of women's union leadership culminated in her 2008 election as executive of the Unified Regional Federation of Peasant Women of Irupana. Reelected to a second two-year term in 2010, Perlacios acceded to a national-level position in 2012 when she joined the directorate of the Bartolina Sisa Confederation as the organization's secretary of defense of the coca leaf.

== Chamber of Senators ==
=== Election ===
Perlacios's membership within the Bartolina Sisas opened the door to her 2014 nomination to the Senate on behalf of the Movement for Socialism (MAS-IPSP). Despite her bottom-of-the-list placement on the party's electoral list, she won the seat, reflecting the high level of MAS support in the La Paz Department—a fact that, since 2009, had allowed the party to consistently take home all four of the region's available Senate seats. Perlacios's election also attested to the openness of the MAS towards including women of rural backgrounds on its roster of candidates, especially in 2014, an action that produced the largest caucus of peasant women elected to parliament in Bolivian history, both in the Senate and Chamber of Deputies. In a legislature composed of roughly fifty percent women, Perlacios was among the quarter who entered as members of the Bartolina Sisa Confederation.

=== Tenure ===
Sworn in at the beginning of 2015, Perlacios became the only-ever member of the Afro-Bolivian community to serve in the Senate and is the most recent individual to do so as of 2025. Together with Andrea Bonilla—who took office in the Chamber of Deputies at the same time—Perlacios is one of the first two black women to have served in parliament. They are the second and third Afro-Bolivian individuals to have held seats in the Legislative Assembly, after Jorge Medina, who represented La Paz in the previous legislature. Regarding advances in Afro recognition in the country, Perlacios expressed optimism, stating that "much progress has been made. We Afros are being taken into account and are in places where important decisions are made."

Perlacios spent much of her senatorial term focused on matters related to coca, its cultivation, regulation, and decriminalization. Her strident promotion of the plant's usage predated even her membership in the Bartolina Sisas. As early as 2010, she had represented the Council of Peasant Federations of the Yungas at meetings in Lima regarding the usage of coca in Peru and Bolivia, and in 2012, she was a delegate to Vienna on behalf of the Departmental Association of Coca Producers (ADEPCOCA), where she promoted the decriminalization of acullico.

As a senator, the subject of coca policy promoted mixed loyalties, as Perlacios contended with her party's attempts to regulate the crop even as her own sector opposed such efforts. Cocaleros of the traditional coca-growing Yungas region had long enjoyed privileged status in regard to cultivation, a situation that the MAS-sponsored General Law of Coca threatened to upend by expanding the government's regulatory oversight over their crop and extending the rival zone of legal production in Cochabamba's Chapare Province. Ultimately, Perlacios held the party line on the matter, rejecting calls from ADEPCOCA that she file a motion of unconstitutionality against the legislation on their behalf, a fact that led the organization to declare her persona non grata. The final passage of the General Law of Coca ruptured the government's fragile relationship with Yungas cocaleros, and though Perlacios continually called for dialogue to resolve the conflict, organizations like ADEPCOCA remained steadfast in their mobilized opposition to the new regulations.

=== Commission assignments ===
- Plural Justice, Prosecutor's Office, and Legal Defense of the State Commission (President: 2020)
- State Security, Armed Forces, and Bolivian Police Commission (President: 2017–2018)
  - Armed Forces and Bolivian Police Commission (Secretary: 2019–2020)
- Planning, Economic Policy, and Finance Commission
  - Planning, Budget, Public Investment, and Comptroller's Office Committee (Secretary: 2015–2016)
- Rural Native Indigenous Peoples and Nations and Interculturality Commission
  - Cultures, Interculturality, and Cultural Heritage Committee (Secretary: 2018–2019)
- Land and Territory, Natural Resources, and the Environment Commission
  - Land and Territory, Natural Resources, and Coca Leaf Committee (Secretary: 2016–2017)
- Ethics and Transparency Commission (2015–2017)

== Electoral history ==
Electoral history of Ancelma Perlacios
Year	Office	Party	Votes			Result	Ref.
Year	Office	Party	Total	%	P.	Result	Ref.
2014	Senator	Movement for Socialism	1,006,433	68.92%	1st	Won	(Note: Presented on an electoral list. The data shown represents the share of the vote the entire party/alliance received in that constituency.)
Source: Plurinational Electoral Organ | Electoral Atlas

Senate of Bolivia
Preceded by Fidel Surco	Senator for La Paz; 2015–2020; Served alongside: José Alberto Gonzales, Jorge Choque, Eva Copa	Succeeded by Cecilia Requena
