= Andrea Bonilla =

Bolivian politician (born 1978)

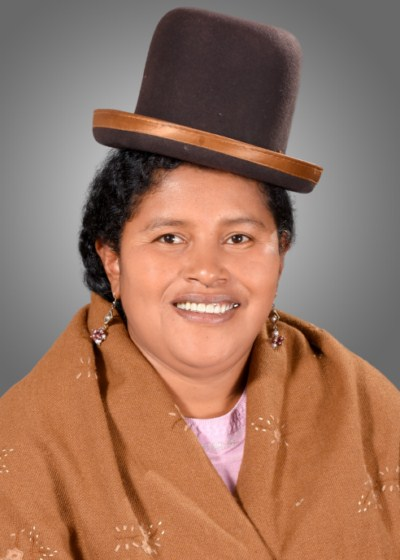
- Official portrait, 2017

Member of the Chamber of Deputies from La Paz
- In office 18 January 2015 – 3 November 2020
- Substitute: Pedro Choque
- Preceded by: Julia Figueredo
- Succeeded by: Soledad Pérez
- Constituency: Party list

Personal details
- Born: Celia Andrea Bonilla Gemio; 4 August 1978 (age 47) Caranavi, La Paz, Bolivia
- Party: Movement for Socialism
- Occupation: Agricultural worker; politician; trade unionist

Celia Andrea Bonilla Gemio (born 4 August 1978) is a Bolivian agricultural worker, politician, and trade unionist who served as a party-list member of the Chamber of Deputies from La Paz from 2015 to 2020. An ethnic Afro-Bolivian, Bonilla's career got its start in northern La Paz's agrarian trade unions, where she held positions as an executive and women's representative. Her prominence there aided in her nomination on the Movement for Socialism's 2014 party list, through which she was elected to the Chamber of Deputies. As a legislator, Bonilla holds the distinction of being the first Afro-Bolivian woman in Bolivian parliamentary history to serve in the lower chamber. She is, together with Ancelma Perlacios, one of the first two Afro-Bolivian women in parliament, and is one of just three overall, after Jorge Medina.

== Early life and career ==
Andrea Bonilla was born on 4 August 1978 in Caranavi, capital of the namesake province in the tropical Yungas region of La Paz. Bonilla spent much of her early life involved in agricultural work before becoming active in the region's agrarian trade syndicates. She served as executive secretary of a workers' federation in neighboring Teoponte Municipality, later joining the Departmental Federation of Intercultural Communities of La Paz, the leading union representing the department's agricultural settlers. Bonilla held office as the organization's women's representative until around 2014, the year she was elected to the Chamber of Deputies.

== Chamber of Deputies ==
=== Election ===
Prominent leaders and representatives of agrarian and rural syndicates had long been a mainstay on the governing Movement for Socialism (MAS)'s electoral lists. In 2014, in particular, women trade unionists of rural backgrounds were given an increased presence, an action that produced the largest caucus of peasant women elected to parliament in Bolivian history. Included among this group was Bonilla, one of three Afro-Bolivian candidates on the ballot that election cycle, alongside Ancelma Perlacios and Mónica Rey.

=== Tenure ===
Entering parliament, Bonilla became the first female member of the Afro-Bolivian community to serve in the Chamber of Deputies and was the second overall, after Jorge Medina, who represented La Paz in the previous legislature. She was one of the first two black women to hold a seat in parliament, a distinction she shares with Ancelma Perlacios, who was sworn into the Senate on the same day. They are, together, the most recent Afro-Bolivians represented in the legislature. At the conclusion of their terms, neither were nominated for reelection, be it in the annulled 2019 election or the rerun 2020 contest.

=== Commission assignments ===
- Constitution, Legislation, and Electoral System Commission
  - Democracy and Electoral System Committee (2018–2019)
- Rural Native Indigenous Peoples and Nations, Cultures, and Interculturality Commission
  - Coca Leaf Committee (2017–2018)
- Human Rights Commission (President: 2019–2020)
  - Human Rights and Equal Opportunities Committee (Secretary: 2016–2017)
- Government, Defense, and Armed Forces Commission
  - Defense, Armed Forces, Borders, and Civil Defense Committee (2015–2016)

== Electoral history ==
Electoral history of Celia Bonilla
Year	Office	Party	Votes			Result	Ref.
Year	Office	Party	Total	%	P.	Result	Ref.
2014	Deputy	Movement for Socialism	1,006,433	68.92%	1st	Won	(Note: Presented on an electoral list. The data shown represents the share of the vote the entire party/alliance received in that constituency.)
Source: Plurinational Electoral Organ | Electoral Atlas

Chamber of Deputies of Bolivia
Preceded by Julia Figueredo	Member of the Chamber of Deputies from La Paz; 2015–2020	Succeeded by Soledad Pérez
