= Cecilia Requena =

Bolivian politician (born 1967)

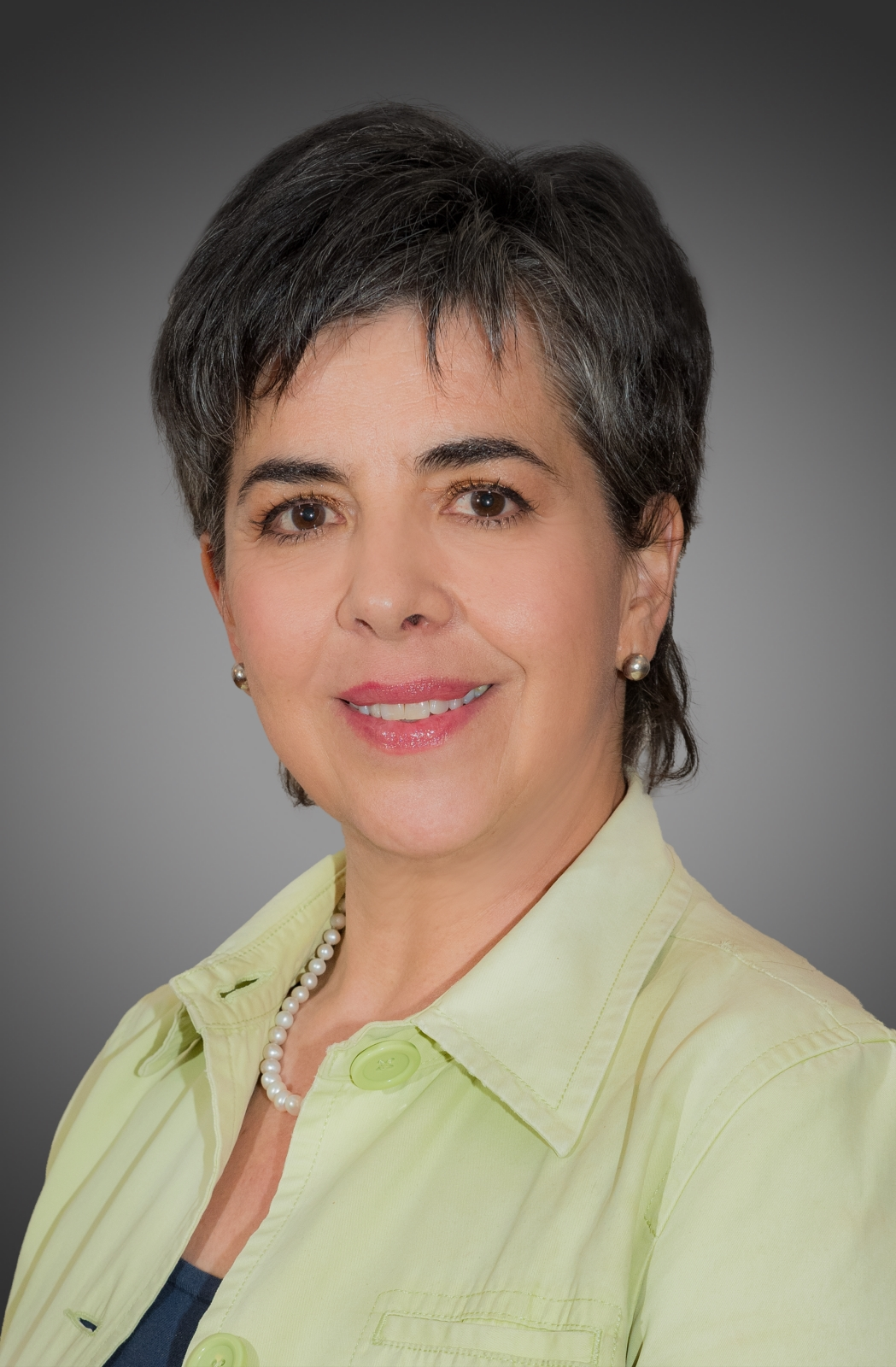
- Official portrait, 2020

Senator for La Paz
- Incumbent
- Assumed office 3 November 2020
- Substitute: Porfirio Menacho
- Preceded by: Ancelma Perlacios

Personal details
- Born: Cecilia Isabel Requena Zárate; 5 March 1967 (age 59) Munich, West Germany
- Spouse: José Antonio Quiroga
- Education: Bolivian Catholic University
- Occupation: Educator; politician; researcher
- Website: Official website

Cecilia Isabel Requena Zárate (born 5 March 1967) is a Bolivian academic, environmentalist, and politician serving as senator for La Paz since 2020. Educated at the Bolivian Catholic University with postgraduate experience at institutes in Europe and the Americas, Requena got her career start as an environmental activist, holding leadership positions in prominent environmental rights agencies. She later did consulting and research work for non-government organizations such as the Friedrich Ebert Foundation, even directing the Bolivian branch of Transparency International.

A critic of the extractivist policies of President Evo Morales, in 2019, Requena ran for a seat in the Senate as part of the opposition Civic Community's all-female roster of senatorial candidates. Following the annulment of those results, Requena was re-nominated for the 2020 general election and won the seat, becoming the first opposition senator to represent La Paz in over a decade. Requena's tenure focused its work on environmental policy, particularly calling out the continued support for extractive industries under Morales's successor, Luis Arce.

== Early life and education ==
Cecilia Requena was born on 5 March 1967 in La Paz. She completed her primary and secondary studies at the city's German international school, from which she graduated in 1985. She later attended the Bolivian Catholic University, where she completed a bachelor's in communication studies and a master's in public policy and administration. During this time and after, Requena also undertook graduate studies at home and abroad; she received a postgraduate diploma in socio-environmental projects from the Latin American Forum of Environmental Sciences in Argentina and completed a second master's in diplomacy and international relations at the Diplomatic Academy of Bolivia.

Requena additionally holds a postgraduate diploma in contemporary art critique, having also taken courses at various institutes and universities in Europe and the Americas, including in leadership for the twenty-first century at the Harvard Kennedy School and others in environmental and human resource management and environmental and citizen journalism. In addition to Spanish, Requena is also fluent in English, French, and German; she received a sprachdiplom while in high school, attained an equivalent certificate from the Goethe-Institut, and took perfectionment courses in Freiburg; completed the Test of English as a Foreign Language; and took classes in French at academic institutes in Paris.

== Academia and environmental activism ==
An avid environmentalist from a young age, Requena served on the directorate of the Bolivian Association for the Defense of Nature between 1992 and 1993, first as coordinator for communication, lobbying, and public awareness and later as the organization's executive secretary. In 1995, she was brought on as a consultant for the Ministry of Sustainable Development and Environment, where she also served as coordinator for communication within the ministry's National Directorate for the Conservation of Biodiversity.

In education, Requena served as a docent at the Bolivian Catholic University, where she taught courses on ethics and leadership as well as on environmental issues, including climate change, ecological impact, and political ecology. Outside of academia, Requena worked as a researcher and held managerial positions for multiple national and international non-governmental organizations operating in the country, including the Friedrich Ebert Foundation and Transparency International Bolivia. During this time, she directed the Bolivian branches of the Canadian Executive Service Organization and Transparency International.

== Chamber of Senators ==
=== Election ===
During the presidency of Evo Morales, Requena established herself as a vocal critic of the administration's support for and expansion of extractive industries. "The government of Evo Morales, which presents itself internationally as a defender of Mother Earth, will remain in Bolivian history as the regime that promoted radical and devastating extractivism," she stated. Requena attributed these faults to Morales's allegedly anti-democratic practices, stating: "where there is no democracy, it is even more difficult to defend nature." She became increasingly politically active following the abolishment of presidential term limits, joining more than 180 other prominent intellectuals in penning a roadmap for the country's transition from an "authoritarian and corporate" state towards a more democratic one.

In the leadup to the 2019 general election, Requena participated in the formation of the Civic Community (CC) alliance, which promoted the presidential candidacy of Carlos Mesa. Among the primary pillars of CC's political platform were democracy0 and environmentalism but also feminism and women's rights, a fact that led the alliance to nominate an all-female slate of senatorial candidates. Requena was selected to represent the La Paz Department in the Senate, a choice potentially brought about at the suggestion of her spouse, José Antonio Quiroga, CC's then-campaign coordinator.

A few days after the election date, Requena was projected as one of La Paz's winning senatorial candidates, alongside three from the ruling Movement for Socialism (MAS-IPSP). As a result of the annulment of the 2019 results, Requena was prevented from being seated but was re-nominated to contest the 2020 election, where she repeated the previous year's victory. In being elected, Requena became the first non-ruling party candidate to win a Senate seat in La Paz since 2005, bucking the trend of 2009 and 2014, when the MAS swept all four of the department's Senate seats. She is thus the first opposition senator to represent La Paz in the Plurinational Legislative Assembly; the last, Luis Vásquez Villamor, served in the now-defunct National Congress.

=== Tenure ===
Once in office, Requena dedicated much of her senatorial term to environmental causes, as she had done throughout her career. Given her minority caucus's limited ability to craft and pass legislation, much of this work revolved around her powers of parliamentary oversight. As a member and chair of the Senate's various environmental committees, Requena oversaw multiple investigations into the government's pro-extraction policy, especially corruption in the Mining Administrative Jurisdictional Authority, the state-run mining activity supervisor.

In particular, Requena sought to highlight the lack of action against illegal mining in protected areas such as La Paz's Madidi National Park, one of the most biodiverse areas in the world. She attributed this lack of enforcement to the government's acquiescence before politically powerful mining cooperatives, whom she accused of promoting "terror and violence" against those who investigate illegal activity. In one instance, Requena herself was attacked with firecrackers and dynamite while conducting an in-person inspection of the park. In mid-2022, she and other CC legislators presented an actio popularis against mining activities that damage the environment in Madidi. The appeal was largely accepted by a court in La Paz later that year, which ruled that legislative and executive authorities should pass new legislation regulating the use of mercury in gold mining, given the immense pollution and environmental damage it causes.

=== Commission assignments ===
- Land and Territory, Natural Resources, and the Environment Commission (President; 2021–2022)
  - Environment, Biodiversity, Amazon, Protected Areas, and Climate Change Committee (Secretary; 2020–2021, 2022–present)
- Ethics and Transparency Commission (2022–present)

== Electoral history ==
Electoral history of Cecilia Requena
Year	Office	Alliance	Votes			Result	Ref.
Year	Office	Alliance	Total	%	P.	Result	Ref.
2019	Senator	Civic Community	497,844	29.83%	2nd	Annulled	(Note: Presented on an electoral list. The data shown represents the share of the vote the entire party/alliance received in that constituency.)
2020	Senator	Civic Community	486,139	28.58%	2nd	Won	
Source: Plurinational Electoral Organ | Electoral Atlas

== Publications ==
- Requena, Cecilia (1999). "Percepciones Bolivianas de la Integración Andina". In Barrios, Raúl (ed.). Comunidad Andina de Naciones: Retos Politicos y Percepciones Ciudadanas (in Spanish). Friedrich-Ebert-Stiftung-Instituto Latinoamericano de Investigaciones Sociales.
- ———————— (2011). "Tras las Huellas del Cambio Climático en Bolivia. Estado del Arte del Conocimiento sobre Adaptación al Cambio Climático, Agua y Seguridad Alimentaria". Tinkazos (in Spanish). 16 (34). La Paz. ISBN 978-99954-711-8-7. ISSN 1990-7451. OCLC 5839922227 – via SciELO.
- ————————; Riberta, Marco Octavio (2011). "Litio Boliviano: Oportunidades y Desafíos". Informe Global de la Corrupción: Cambio Climático (in Spanish). Transparency International. pp. 240–243. ISBN 978-3-935711-70-8. OCLC 927819549.
- ————————; Hoffmann, Dirk (2012). Bolivia en un Mundo 4 Grados más Caliente: Escenarios Sociopolíticos ante el Cambio Climático para los Años 2030 y 2060 en el Altiplano Norte (PDF) (in Spanish). La Paz: Instituto Boliviano de la Montaña; Fundación para la Investigación Estratégica en Bolivia. ISBN 978-99954-57-57-0. OCLC 1023554841.
- ————————; Hoffmann, Dirk (2016). "Escenarios Socio-ecológicos frente al Cambio Climático en el Altiplano Boliviano". In Postigo, Julio C.; Young, Kenneth R. (eds.). Naturaleza y Sociedad: Perspectivas Socio-ecológicas sobre Cambios Globales en América Latina (in Spanish). Lima: desco; Instituto de Estudios Peruanos; Instituto de Ciencias de la Naturaleza, Tierra y Energías Renovables. pp. 341–370. ISBN 978-9972-51-609-2. OCLC 991618790 – via ResearchGate.
- ———————— (2017). "Bolivia en un Mundo 4 Grados más Caliente: Escenarios Sociopolíticos ante el Cambio Climático en el Altiplano Norte". In da Costa Ferreira, Lúcia; et al. (eds.). Clima de Tensão: Ação Humana, Biodiversidade e Mudanças Climáticas (in Portuguese and Spanish). Campinas SP: Editora da Unicamp. pp. 201–234. ISBN 978-85-268-1370-0. OCLC 1100486029 – via ResearchGate.
- ———————— (2021). "En Pos de Claves para Impulsar Indispensables y Urgentes Transformaciones". In Souverein, Jan; Jordán Prudencio, Nicole (eds.). Crisis Ecológica y del Cuidado, Extractivismo y Pueblos Indígenas (PDF) (in Spanish). La Paz: Friedrich-Ebert-Stiftung. pp. 15–50. ISBN 978-9917-0-0575-9. OCLC 1286859106.

Senate of Bolivia
Preceded by Ancelma Perlacios	Senator for La Paz; 2020–present Served alongside: Virginia Velasco; Félix Ajpi, Simona Quispe	Incumbent
