= Caranavi Municipality =

- Municipality
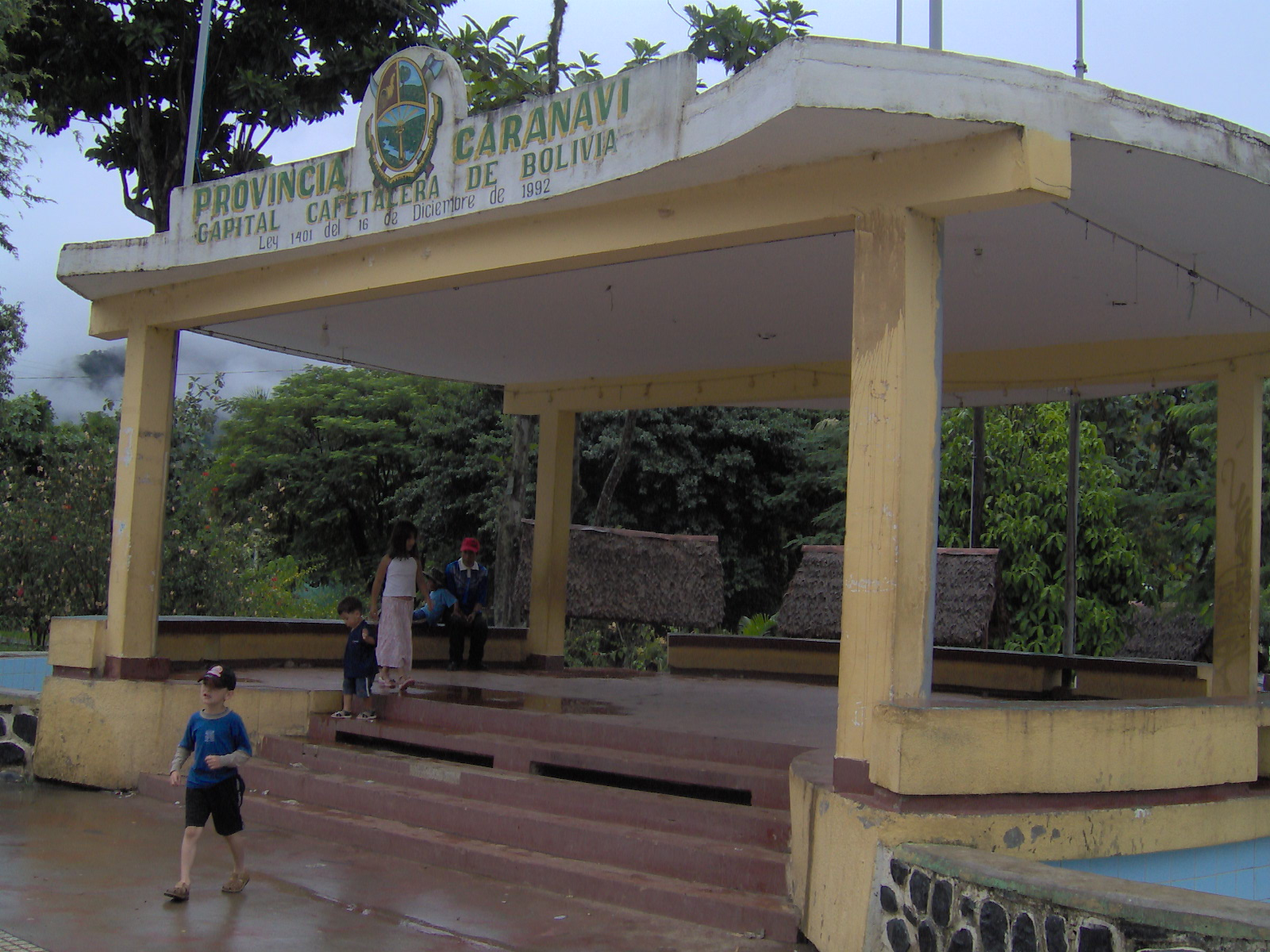
- Main square in Caranavi

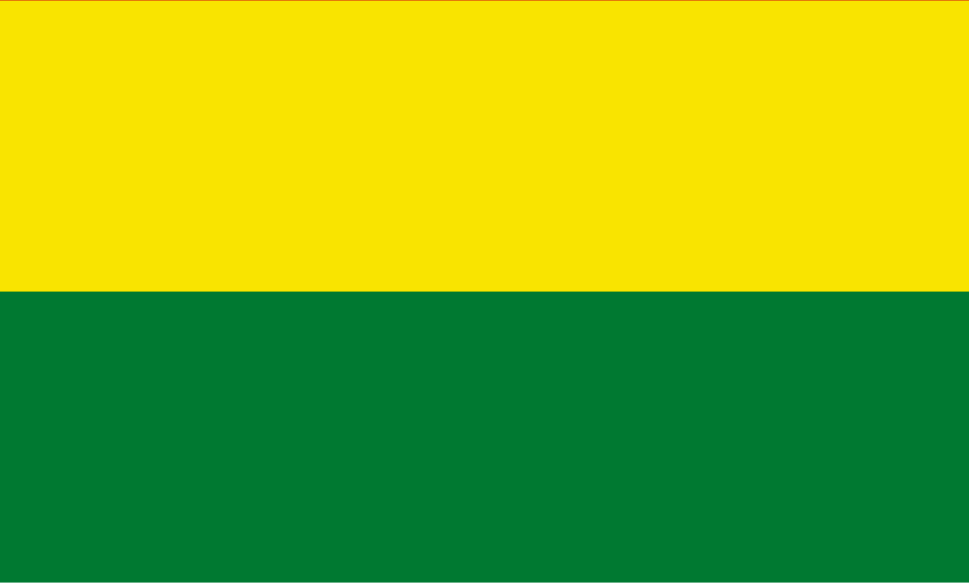
- Flag

- Location of the Caranavi Municipality within Bolivia
- Coordinates: 15°49′S 67°33′W
- Country: Bolivia
- Department: La Paz Department
- Province: Caranavi Province
- Seat: Caranavi

Government
  - Mayor: Teodocio Quilca Acarapi (MAS-IPSP; 2010)

Caranavi Municipality is the first municipal section of the Caranavi Province in the La Paz Department, Bolivia. Its seat is Caranavi. The municipality, which had formerly contained the entire province, was reduced in size when the Alto Beni Municipality was created by Law 4131 on 23 December 2009.
