= Jorge Medina =

Bolivian politician (1968–2022)

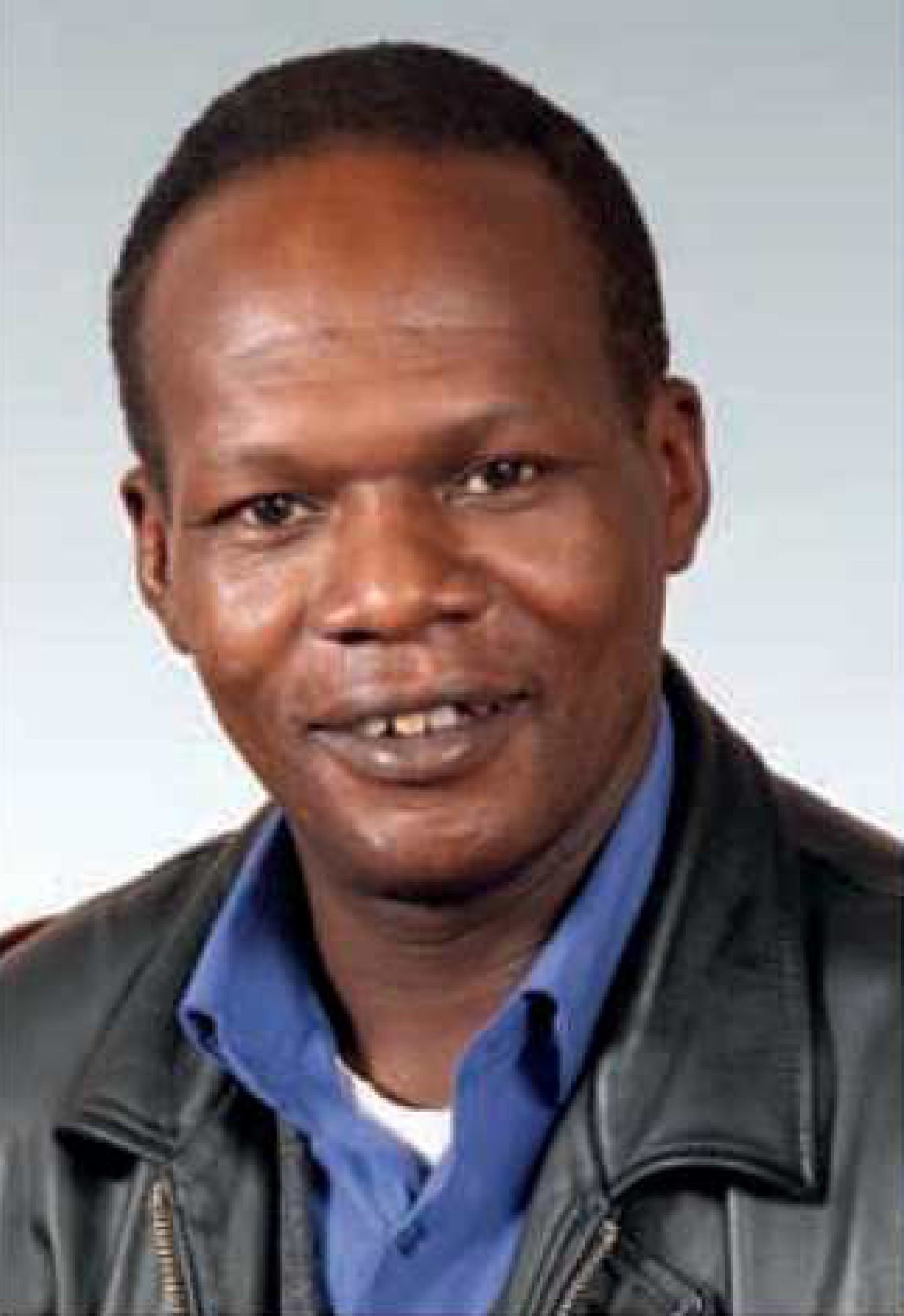
- Official portrait, 2014

Member of the Chamber of Deputies from La Paz's special circumscription
- In office 19 January 2010 – 18 January 2015
- Substitute: Blanca Cartagena
- Preceded by: Seat established
- Succeeded by: Alicia Natte

Personal details
- Born: Jorge Medina Barra; 24 April 1968 Chijchipa, La Paz, Bolivia
- Died: 23 November 2022 (aged 54) La Paz, Bolivia
- Party: Movement for Socialism
- Education: Higher University of San Andrés; University of Aquinas
- Occupation: Activist; politician
- Website: Official website

Jorge Medina Barra (Spanish: [ˈxoɾxe meˈðina]; 24 April 1968 – 23 November 2022) was a Bolivian civil rights activist and politician who served as a member of the Chamber of Deputies from La Paz, representing its special indigenous circumscription from 2010 to 2015.

Raised in the Afro-Bolivian community of the tropical Yungas region, Medina became active in the Afro civil rights movement after moving to the city of La Paz. He was a founding member of the Afro-Bolivian Saya Cultural Movement and co-founded the Afro-Bolivian Center for Integral and Community Development, two organizations dedicated to promoting public and state recognition of Afro cultural identity.

Having succeeded in securing the inclusion of Afro-Bolivians in the 2009 Constitution, Medina was later elected to represent La Paz's minority indigenous peoples in the Chamber of Deputies, becoming the first Afro-Bolivian to serve in either chamber of the Bolivian legislature. In parliament, Medina spearheaded Bolivia's flagship Law Against Racism and promoted other pro-Afro pieces of legislation. He was not nominated for reelection.

== Early life and career ==
Jorge Medina was born on 24 April 1968 to Paulino Medina and Sergia Barra, an Afro-Bolivian family from the rural community of Chijchipa in the La Paz Department's agricultural Nor Yungas Province. Medina completed his primary schooling in the nearby town of Tocaña before moving with his parents to Caranavi in Alto Beni, where he attended the city's Martín Cárdenas School. After graduating in 1988, Medina moved to the city of La Paz to pursue a college education; he studied business administration at the Higher University of San Andrés and took courses in systems engineering at the University of Aquinas. In the ensuing years, Medina worked a number of odd jobs, spending six years as a chauffeur for the Golden Eagle Mining Company before being employed as a mechanic at a local workshop, and later as a laborer for a nearby paper company. He also spent short stints as an employee at YPFB – the state-owned petroleum enterprise – and the Ministry of Labor.

== Activism and organizational leadership ==
Medina's entry into the Afro-Bolivian civil rights movement was precipitated by his early experiences residing in La Paz, a city "devoid of Afro-Bolivians ... [where] it was not uncommon for other Bolivians to be oblivious to the existence of black people". Recognition of the Afro-Bolivian population was niche, limited in academia to Western scholars studying the African diaspora. Their presence in public often promoted racial discrimination, including physical harassment, due to the superstitious belief that pinching a black person would bring good luck. "It was 'lucky negro'; they surrounded us ... and fought among themselves over who saw us first", Medina recalled.

Starting from the late 1980s, Medina became active in promoting the saya, a style of Afro-Bolivian folk songs mixed with drums, which the Afro movement had begun using to generate cultural visibility. During this time, Medina also distinguished himself as a popular saya composer and performer in his own right, writing the songs "Flor de Alelí", "Ser Líder de un Grupo", and "Guarachera de Cuba", among others. Along with other activists, Medina founded the Afro-Bolivian Saya Cultural Movement (MOCUSABOL) in 1988, which became one of the country's leading Afro-Bolivian civil rights and awareness organizations. He served as vice president and later president of the body for five years between 1999 and 2004.

Despite MOCUSABOL's successes in spreading the saya's popularity, Medina soon grew frustrated with the growing perception that Afro-Bolivians were just "'the negros who dance.' That made me angry because we are not only good at dancing, we can do other things", he stated. In 2006, together with Marfa Inofuentes, Medina founded the Afro-Bolivian Center for Integral and Community Development (CADIC), of which he served as executive director. The organization actively worked to advance Afro-Bolivian civil and political rights, taking a leading role in attaining state recognition of the Afro community during the 2006–2007 Constituent Assembly, which was then redrafting the Bolivian constitution. By the end of the process, CADIC was successful in securing the same minority rights for Afro-Bolivians as those granted to the country's indigenous peoples.

== Chamber of Deputies ==
=== Election ===
With minority groups increasingly encouraged to participate in politics, Medina was nominated to contest a seat in the Chamber of Deputies on behalf of the Movement for Socialism. (Note: The nomination had been initially granted to ex-footballer Demetrio Angola, to the chagrin of Medina's supporters. Ultimately, Angola was forced to withdraw his candidacy, given that he was in active military service.) Given the offer, Medina recalled stating, "Barack Obama is president of the United States; why should an Afro not be able to be in parliament here in Bolivia". He ran to represent the La Paz Department's newly created special rural native indigenous circumscription – an innovation of the 2009 Constitution – a district with constituents comprising the department's Afro-Bolivian, Araona, Kallawaya, Leco, Mosetén, and Tacana peoples. He received one of the highest vote shares of the entire election cycle, winning nearly ninety-two percent of the popular vote, becoming the first Afro-Bolivian in history to serve in either chamber of the Legislative Assembly.

=== Tenure ===
As a parliamentarian, Medina was instrumental in drafting what became the Law Against Racism and All Forms of Discrimination. Promulgated by President Evo Morales in October 2010, the new legislation imposed varying penalties for perpetrators of racism and discrimination, identifying Afro-Bolivians as a particularly vulnerable ethnic minority group. In the years following its enactment, the law faced numerous challenges and shortfalls, including difficulty of enforcement and a lack of knowledge from both the general public and the judiciary regarding what exactly constitutes a prosecutable offense. According to analyst Henry Stobart, "newspaper reports from 2014 characterized the law as 'not worth the paper it was written on', arguing that there had been no prosecutions, despite the hundreds of complaints received". On the other hand, Professor Sara Busdiecker pointed out that "despite its flaws and limitations to prevent racism outright, [the law] has given people pause to think before acting and speaking in some circumstances", producing a "social 'hesitation' of sorts" because "even if [offenders] do not understand all the details, 'they know there is a law'". For his part, Medina echoed that sentiment, stating that the legislation's intention was never to "fill the prisons with those who discriminate" but rather to promote conciliation.

For the duration of his tenure, Medina continuously worked to promote the recognition of the Afro-Bolivian population. He facilitated the passage of numerous symbolic laws recognizing Afro culture, including one declaring 23 September to be the National Day of the Afro-Bolivian People and another establishing the saya as part of the country's cultural heritage. The 2012 census was held midway through Medina's term, a notable event, as it was the first time the government had ever tabulated the Afro-Bolivian population in its history. Using this data, Medina put forward the concept of creating a majority Afro-Bolivian municipality to give greater electoral representation to its inhabitants, though the concept never got off the ground. Upon the conclusion of his term in 2015, Medina retired from politics and returned to the direction of CADIC.

=== Commission assignments ===
Remarks during a legislative session, 10 October 2012.

- Rural Native Indigenous Peoples and Nations, Cultures, and Interculturality Commission (President; 2011–2012)
  - Rural Native Indigenous Peoples and Nations Committee (2010–2011)
- Plural Economy, Production, and Industry Commission
  - Industry, Commerce, Transport, and Tourism Committee (2012–2013)
- Social Policy Commission
  - Social Security and Protection Committee (2013–2014)
- Planning, Economic Policy, and Finance Commission
  - Financial, Monetary, and Insurance Policy Committee (Secretary; 2014–2015)

== Personal life and death ==
Medina married Mirian Iriondo, an ethnic Afro-Bolivian saya performer from Chulumani in the Sud Yungas Province. The couple had two children: Adin Dube and Malaika, Swahili names meaning "strength and passion" and "angel", respectively. His relative, Tomasa Medina, also gained notoriety in the Afro-Bolivian community, though as an opponent of the MAS and its efforts to expand its influence over the Yungas-based coca market. Outside of his work at MOCUSABOL and CADIC, Medina was also active in radio, hosting the talk show Raíces Africanas, which began airing in 2001. In film, he starred as a supporting actor in 2005's American Visa. Medina died on 23 November 2022, aged 54. His passing was commemorated by various Afro-Bolivian organizations and by the Chamber of Deputies.

== Electoral history ==
Electoral history of Jorge Medina
Year	Office	Party	Votes			Result	Ref.
Year	Office	Party	Total	%	P.	Result	Ref.
2009	Deputy	Movement for Socialism	13,283	91.97%	1st	Won	
Source: Plurinational Electoral Organ | Electoral Atlas

Chamber of Deputies of Bolivia
Seat established	Member of the Chamber of Deputies from La Paz's special circumscription 2010–2015	Succeeded by Alicia Natte
