= Apaza =

Apaza is a surname. Notable people with the surname include:

- Gonzalo Olid Apaza (born 1992), Argentinian association football player
- Gregoria Apaza (1751–1782), Bolivian indigenous leader
- Máxima Apaza (born 1960), Bolivian Indigenous activist and politician
- René Fernández Apaza (1924–2013), Bolivian Roman Catholic archbishop
