= Marfa Inofuentes =

Afro-Bolivian activist

- Born: Marfa Inofuentes Pérez; 1969; La Paz, Bolivia
- Died: March 4, 2015 (aged 45–46); La Paz, Bolivia
- Other names: Marfa Inofuentes
- Occupation: civil rights activist
- Years active: 1990–2011
- Known for: Lobbying for inclusion of Afro-Bolivians as an ethnic minority protected under the Bolivian constitution

Marfa Inofuentes Pérez (1969–2015) was an Afro-Bolivian activist involved in the Constitutional reform movement to recognize black Bolivians as an ethnic minority in the country. After achieving the goal for Afro-Bolivians to be protected under the law, she served as the head of the Ministry of Gender and was appointed deputy mayor of the Peripheral Macro district of the Municipality of La Paz.

== Early life ==
Marfa Inofuentes Pérez was born in 1969 in La Paz, Bolivia, one of three children of Benjamín Inofuentes. Her father was born in Tocaña, a village in the Bolivian Yungas Region, where the majority of the country's Afro-Bolivians originated. After completion of her secondary studies, Inofuentes enrolled in the Universidad Mayor de San Andrés, studying sociology and law.

== Career ==
In 1990 Inofuentes joined the Afro-Bolivian Saya Cultural Movement (Spanish: Movimiento Cultural Saya Afroboliviana (MCSA)), a group organized to preserve the cultural traditions of black Bolivians, particularly the art form of saya, by increasing their visibility and acceptance in the wider society. She participated in a public performance of Saya in Tocaña in 1990, one of the first times that the public was allowed to witness the ceremonies.

In 2001, after the World Conference against Racism, Inofuentes and Jorge Medina co-founded the Afro-Bolivian Center for Community Development (Spanish: Centro Afroboliviano para el Desarrollo Integral y Comunitario (CADIC)) to advocate for government recognition of Bolivia's black population. According to a 1997 poll by the Inter-American Development Bank, which included Mónica Rey Gutiérrez, another Afro-Bolivian activist, the population numbered around 20,000 people, but the previous census in 2001 had no category except "other" to survey the actual size of the ethnic group. She believed that lack of state recognition as a minority, and inability to determine the size of the population, furthered marginalization of Afro-Bolivians, as there were no protections in law for discrimination or racial violence.

Traveling widely, Inofuentes represented Bolivia's black women at meetings of the Organization of Ibero-American States in Brazil, Colombia, Ecuador, Panama, Peru, and the United States. She was also a member of the feminist organization the Network of Caribbean Latin American and African Diaspora Women (Spanish: Red de Mujeres del Caribe, de América Latina y la Diáspora Africana (RMCALDA)).

In 2006, after the election of President Evo Morales, lawmakers met in Sucre to rewrite the Constitution. Inofuentes and other black activists lobbied all of the political parties, pressing for recognition as an ethnic group. As one of the main activists involved in the Bolivian Constitutional Assembly, Inofuentes argued for the addition of articles to protect the civil rights of Afro-Bolivians, including language that recognized the population and protected their culture with the same provisions afforded to indigenous people and other intercultural minorities. Gaining the concessions desired, in 2009, Afro-Bolivians gained constitutional protection and recognition, after the Bolivian constitutional referendum passed. Her activism led to her being appointed to head the Ministry of Gender. In 2010, she was appointed as Deputy Mayor of the Peripheral Macro district of the Municipality of La Paz, but after one year, she developed health problems and entered into a coma from which she did not recover.

== Death and legacy ==
Inofuentes died on 4 March 2015 at the Obrero Hospital in La Paz and is most remembered for her activism to gain recognition for the cultural traditions and identity of Afro-Bolivians.
