= Trade Union Confederation of Intercultural Indigenous Communities of Bolivia =

Bolivian trade union

CSCIOB
- Trade Union Confederation of Intercultural Indigenous Communities of Bolivia
- Confederación Sindical de Comunidades Interculturales Originarios de Bolivia);
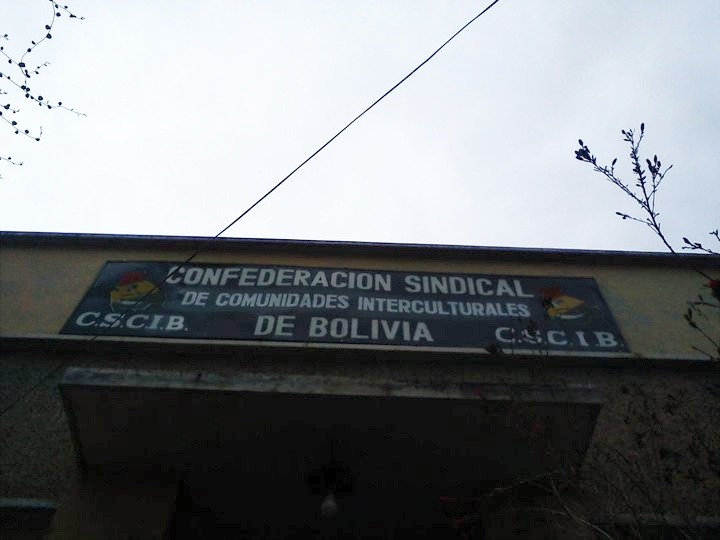
- Founded: 18 February 1971
- Headquarters: La Paz, Bolivia
- Location: Bolivia
- Affiliations: COB
- Website: csciob.org

The Trade Union Confederation of Intercultural Indigenous Communities of Bolivia (Spanish: Confederación Sindical de Comunidades Interculturales Originarios de Bolivia; CSCIOB) is a peasant union confederation of rural communities in the Bolivian lowlands whose members are of highland origin. It was founded on 18 February 1971 as the Trade Union Confederation of Colonizers of Bolivia (Spanish: Confederación Sindical de Colonizadores de Bolivia; CSCB). At the time, its independence from the government represented a defiant break from the so-called Military-Peasant Pact.

The Confederation is a founding member of the National Coordination for Change (CONALCAM). Its leader from 2007 to 2010, Fidel Surco, became president of CONALCAM as well as a Senator in the Plurinational Legislative Assembly.

== Leadership ==
In its most recent Ordinary National Conference, held in August 2010 in Ivirgarzama, Cochabamba, CSCIB elected the following leaders:

- Executive Secretary: Pedro Calderón, from Carrasco, Tropics of Cochabamba
- Secretary General: Néstor Aliaga, from Caranavi, La Paz
- International Relations: Evaristo Huallpa, from San Julián, Santa Cruz

Prior leaders include Fidel Surco (2007-August 2010) from Alto Beni, La Paz.
