= Julia Figueredo =

Bolivian politician (born 1966)

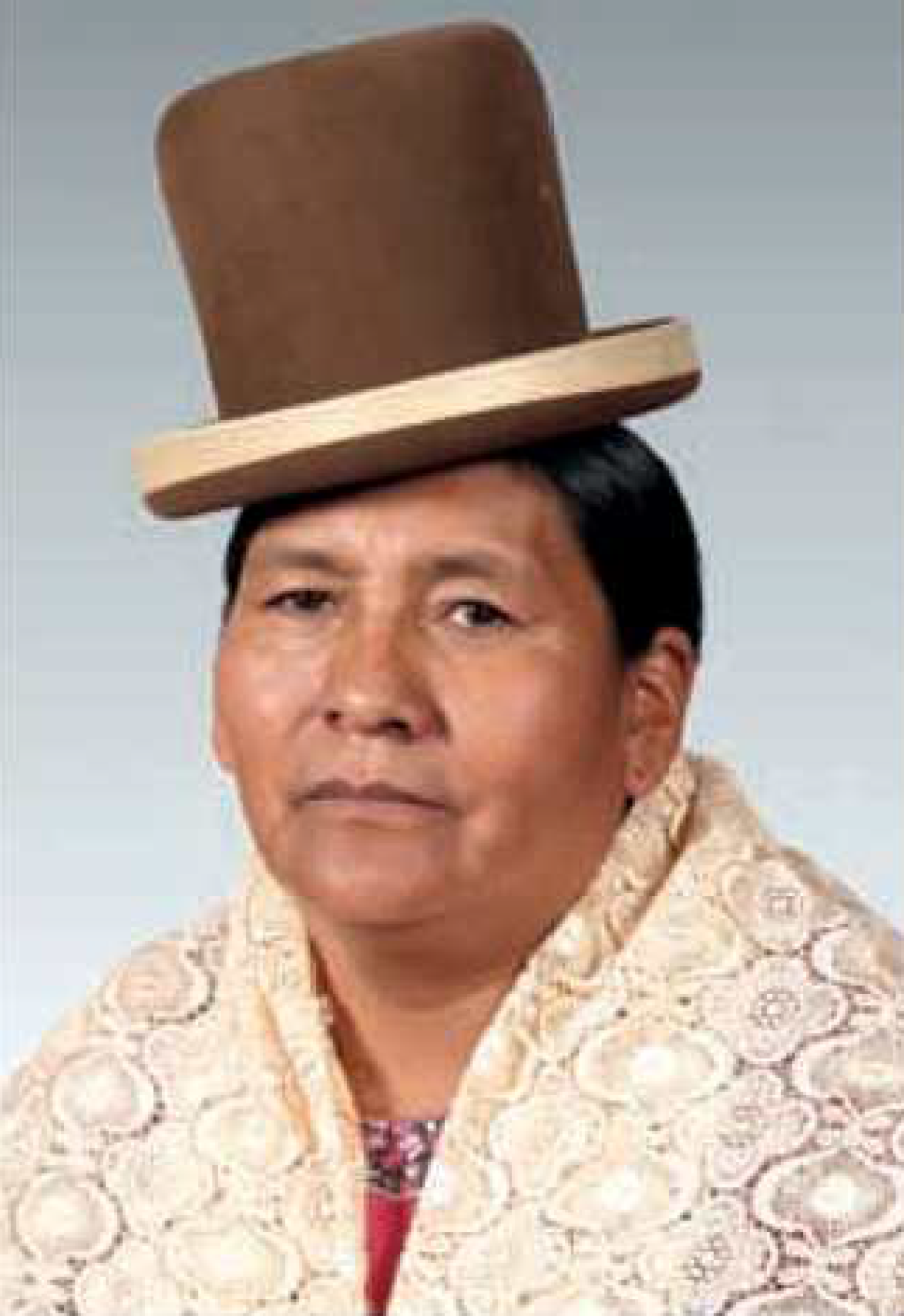
- Official portrait, 2014

Member of the Chamber of Deputies from La Paz
- In office 19 January 2010 – 18 January 2015
- Substitute: Eufren Troche
- Preceded by: Fernando Messmer
- Succeeded by: Andrea Bonilla
- Constituency: Party list

Personal details
- Born: Julia Figueredo Paniagua; 22 May 1966 (age 60) San José, La Paz, Bolivia
- Party: Movement for Socialism
- Occupation: Agricultural worker; politician; trade unionist

Julia Figueredo Paniagua (born 22 May 1966) is a Bolivian agricultural worker, politician, and trade unionist who served as a party-list member of the Chamber of Deputies from La Paz from 2010 to 2015.

Figueredo was born in the Altiplano but relocated to the Yungas as a young adult. Her family made careers as agricultural workers, with Figueredo also taking courses to become a midwife. She was active in trade unionism, holding positions on the local and provincial level within the region's agrarian and women's syndicates, particularly the Bartolina Sisa Confederation.

A member of the Movement for Socialism, Figueredo was appointed sub-prefect of Inquisivi Province and elected to the Chamber of Deputies from the party's electoral list in 2009. She joined a small caucus of legislators representing the Bartolina Sisa Confederation in parliament. At the end of her term, Figueredo did not seek reelection.

== Early life and career ==
=== Early life and education ===
Julia Figueredo was born on 22 May 1966 in San José, a rural settlement in Papel Pampa, second municipal section of the Villarroel Province, on the highland Altiplano Plateau. The dry – bordering on arid – region is primarily populated by the Aymara, who base their livings on a mixture of animal husbandry and small-scale agriculture. For their part, Figueredo's family were pastoralists: they grazed cattle and herded sheep, with some smallholdings for crop cultivation.

A peasant, Figueredo's youth was mired in abject poverty. Her father, Luciano Figueredo, abandoned the family, leaving her mother, Gregoria Paniagua Fernández, to raise Julia and her six siblings on her own. The family's income allowed Figueredo to attend school only through fourth-grade primary. As a young adult, she took vocational courses in nurse assistance, certifying her to work as a practicing midwife. (Note: Lack of female educational attainment was a frequent experience in rural agrarian regions of the country. Common practice was to prioritize male education, whereas girls were instead prepared for domestic labor. In the absence of basic rural health services, midwifery allowed some women to play an elevated social role, even into the beginning of the twenty-first century.)

=== Career and trade unionism ===
After marrying her husband around age 19–20, Figueredo settled in Inquisivi Province in the tropical Yungas. The couple tended to a small chacra in Lacayotini, a village in Licoma Pampa Municipality, where they harvested vegetables like potatoes and tomatoes and worked as dairy farmers.

Around this time, Figueredo started taking part in the labor movement as a member of the region's rural trade syndicates. Beginning in the early 2000s, Figueredo progressively rose through the ranks of the Bartolina Sisa Confederation, chairing her local agrarian and women's union before being elected executive secretary of the organization's provincial branch in Inquisivi. During this time, she was actively involved in the mass mobilizations that characterized early 2000s Bolivia, including the 2003 gas conflict and the tribulations of the 2006–2007 Constituent Assembly.

Backed by community members in Licoma, Figueredo was appointed sub-prefect of Inquisivi by La Paz Prefect Pablo Ramos. In her position, Figueredo worked to develop provincial road infrastructure and public works. She collaborated with the departmental administration to promote the bicentennial anniversary of the La Paz revolution – whose leader, Pedro Domingo Murillo, was born in Inquisivi.

== Chamber of Deputies ==
=== Election ===
Personal sympathy toward the political left, coupled with the pre-existing ties many peasant unions had to the party, fostered Figueredo's affiliation with the Movement for Socialism (MAS). Figueredo formally joined the MAS in tandem with her ascension through union leadership, buoyed by the Bartolina Sisa Confederation's entrenched roots within the party apparatus. In 2009, Figueredo was put forward by the Bartolinas for a seat in the Chamber of Deputies. She wrested the nomination from among three contending candidates representing regional social movement organizations – the Bartolina Sisa and Túpac Katari unions and select cocalero groups – and was presented on the MAS's electoral list in the La Paz Department.

=== Tenure ===
Figueredo joined nine other members of the Bartolina Sisa Confederation in parliament – five in the Chamber of Deputies, with one other representing the same department: Patricia Mancilla. Considering her Yungas roots, she was made a member of the Coca Leaf Committee from 2010 to 2011 but spent the duration of her term as part of the Prosecutor's Office Committee. In 2013, Figueredo was elected president of La Paz's parliamentary delegation, the first indigenous woman to hold the post. At the end of her term, Figueredo was not nominated for reelection, nor did she seek it, preferring instead to retire to her chacra in Inquisivi.

=== Commission assignments ===
- Plural Justice, Prosecutor's Office, and Legal Defense of the State Commission
  - Prosecutor's Office and Legal Defense of the State Committee (2011–2015)
- Rural Native Indigenous Peoples and Nations, Cultures, and Interculturality Commission
  - Coca Leaf Committee (2010–2011)

== Electoral history ==
Electoral history of Julia Figueredo
Year	Office	Party	Votes			Result	Ref.
Year	Office	Party	Total	%	P.	Result	Ref.
2009	Deputy	Movement for Socialism	1,099,259	80.28%	1st	Won	(Note: Presented on an electoral list. The data shown represents the share of the vote the entire party/alliance received in that constituency.)
Source: Plurinational Electoral Organ | Electoral Atlas

Chamber of Deputies of Bolivia
Preceded by Fernando Messmer	Member of the Chamber of Deputies from La Paz; 2010–2015	Succeeded by Andrea Bonilla
