= Fidel Surco =

Bolivian Senator for La Paz

Senator for La Paz
- In office 22 January 2010 – 22 January 2015
- Substitute: Rossemery Carlo
- Preceded by: Seat established
- Succeeded by: Ancelma Perlacios

Personal details
- Born: Fidel Andrés Surco Cañasaca; 30 November 1975 (age 50) La Paz, Bolivia
- Party: Movement for Socialism
- Spouse: Arminda Colque

Fidel Andrés Surco Cañasaca (born 30 November 1975) is a Bolivian lawyer, politician, and unionist who served as a Senator for La Paz from 2010 to 2015. A member of the Movement for Socialism, Surco served as secretary general of the Departmental Federation of Colonizers of La Paz in 2004 and as Executive of the Syndicalist Confederation of Colonizers of Bolivia from 2006 to 2011. He is the vice president of the Movement for Socialism, having been elected on 3 January 2017.

== Biography ==
Fidel Surco was born on 30 November 1975. He was active for years in the trade union movement in Alto Beni, working as technical facilitator for the Syndicalist Confederation of Colonizers of Bolivia (CSCB) from 1997 to 2003 before moving on to become secretary general of the Departmental Federation of Colonizers of La Paz in 2004. Surco gained national visibility for his participation in the social movements which engulfed Bolivia in the early 2000s. With the support of these sectors, the Movement for Socialism (MAS) was elevated to power in 2005, with Surco aiding the new administration in its first few years in his capacity as executive secretary of the CSCIB from 2006 to 2010.

In the 2009 general elections, Surco's political and union position facilitated his inclusion on the MAS party list for the position of La Paz senator. The first year of his senatorial term was marred by conflict between the unions and the MAS with Surco caught in the middle. At a meeting held in La Paz on 14 May 2010, the CSCIB censured him for his support for the installation of a citrus processing plant in Alto Beni, after two of the union's members were shot dead while protesting its construction. On 29 August, the 19th Congress of the CSCIB held in Ivirgarzama elected to dismiss Surco as the organization's executive secretary. Nearing the end of his term in 2014, he was not renominated for reelection, but remained a close affiliate of the MAS base.

In December 2016, he sought to become the vice president of the MAS at the party's 9th Congress, obtaining support of the majority of the members of the Syndicalist Confederation of Intercultural Communities (CSCIOB). His nomination resulted in internal struggles within the MAS between himself and Gerardo García. On 3 January 2017, the CSCIOB proclaimed Surco as the new vice president of the party with García as a member of the Ethics and Discipline Commission. However, this was overturned on 12 January when President Evo Morales announced that the National Directorate of the MAS had reached a consensus and decided to elect García.

Senate of Bolivia
Seat established	Senator for La Paz; 2010–2015	Succeeded by Ancelma Perlacios
