= Máxima Apaza =

Bolivian activist and politician

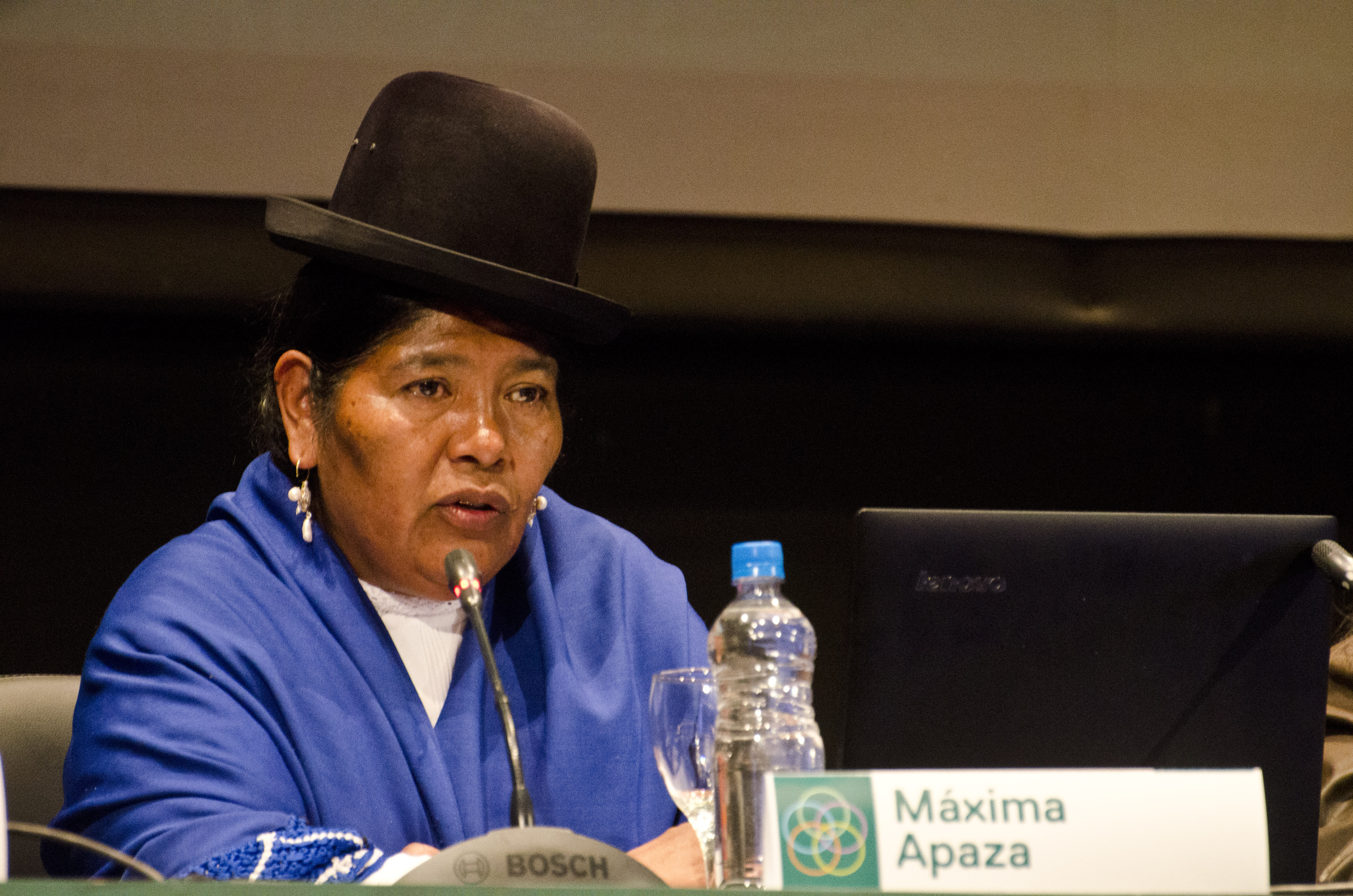
- Apaza in 2015

Senator for La Paz
- In office 18 September 2018 – 3 November 2020
- Preceded by: José Alberto Gonzales
- Succeeded by: Virginia Velasco Condori

Substitute Senator for La Paz
- In office 22 January 2015 – 18 September 2018
- Senator: José Alberto Gonzales
- Preceded by: Javier Hurtado Mercado
- Succeeded by: Hilarión Padilla Mamani

Personal details
- Born: Máxima Apaza Millares; 1 October 1960 (age 66) La Paz, Bolivia
- Party: Movement for Socialism

Máxima Apaza Millares (born 1 October1960) is a Bolivian Indigenous activist and politician.

== Career ==
Since the 1980s, she has been an activist against gender violence. In 1994, she was a candidate for councilor for the city of La Paz. She is the leader of the National Confederation of Women. Máxima Apaza founded the Federation of Women of El Alto.

She was elected senator as substitute for Senator José Alberto Gonzales for the MAS (Movement to Socialism).

In July 2015 she participated in the "Foro Nueva Independencia", held in the Argentine city of Tucumán (Argentina): In the panel "With women you will have to fight: gender, politics and social movements. Traditions of struggle, political and social memory. New challenges for women" shared with the panelists Hebe de Bonafini (president of the association Mothers of the Plaza de Mayo), with Milagro Sala (activist from Jujuy, leader of the association La Tupac Amaru), and with Piedad Córdoba, moderated by the writer and activist Marta Dillon.

Máxima Apaza highlighted the decolonizing character and the gender perspective in the policies implemented by the Government led by Evo Morales. But, simultaneously, she recognized the need for a collective work and from the bases to end against the patriarchy: "If in a home we put into practice decolonization, assuming men and women the roles and functions of the home, is a contribution in this historical juncture we are living".

Apaza is an advocate for safe abortions. She has worked with Ipas for years to educate people on the preventable public health problem of unsafe abortion, which tends to greatly affect rural, indigenous women. Prior to her work in Bolivia, abortions were only accessible in cases of rape. Furthermore, women were dying as a result of unsafe abortions. Though restrictions on these abortions still exist, Apaza has contributed to women being able to have access to safe and effective abortions. Pregnant women with serious health conditions, financial limitations, and who are minors or adolescents are now among those who are able to access safe abortions.

Apaza's stance on the reform of the penal code regarding abortions is as follows: "We cannot turn a blind eye to this reality. With the reform of the penal code, for the first time women will be able to decide over their own bodies and that decision must be respected."

Political offices
Preceded by Javier Hurtado Mercado	Substitute Senator for La Paz; 2015–2018	Succeeded by Hilarión Padilla Mamani
Preceded by José Alberto Gonzales	Senator for La Paz; 2018–2020	Succeeded by Virginia Velasco Condori
