= Actio popularis =

Ground for public interest litigation

An actio popularis was an action in Roman penal law brought by a member of the public in the interest of public order.

The action exists in some modern legal systems. For example, in Spain, an actio popularis was accepted by Judge Garzón in June 1996 which charged that certain Argentine military officers had committed crimes of genocide and terrorism. The actions were brought by the Free Union of Lawyers, Izquierda Unida and the Madrid Argentine Association for Human Rights: private citizens and organisations who were not themselves the victims of the crimes in the action and who proceeded without the sanction of the public prosecuting authorities. In India, public interest litigation has been used to guarantee several human rights, including the right to health, livelihood, free and compulsory primary education, unpolluted environment, shelter, clean drinking water, privacy, legal aid, speedy trial, and several rights of under-trials, convicts and prisoners.
