= Mónica Rey Gutiérrez =

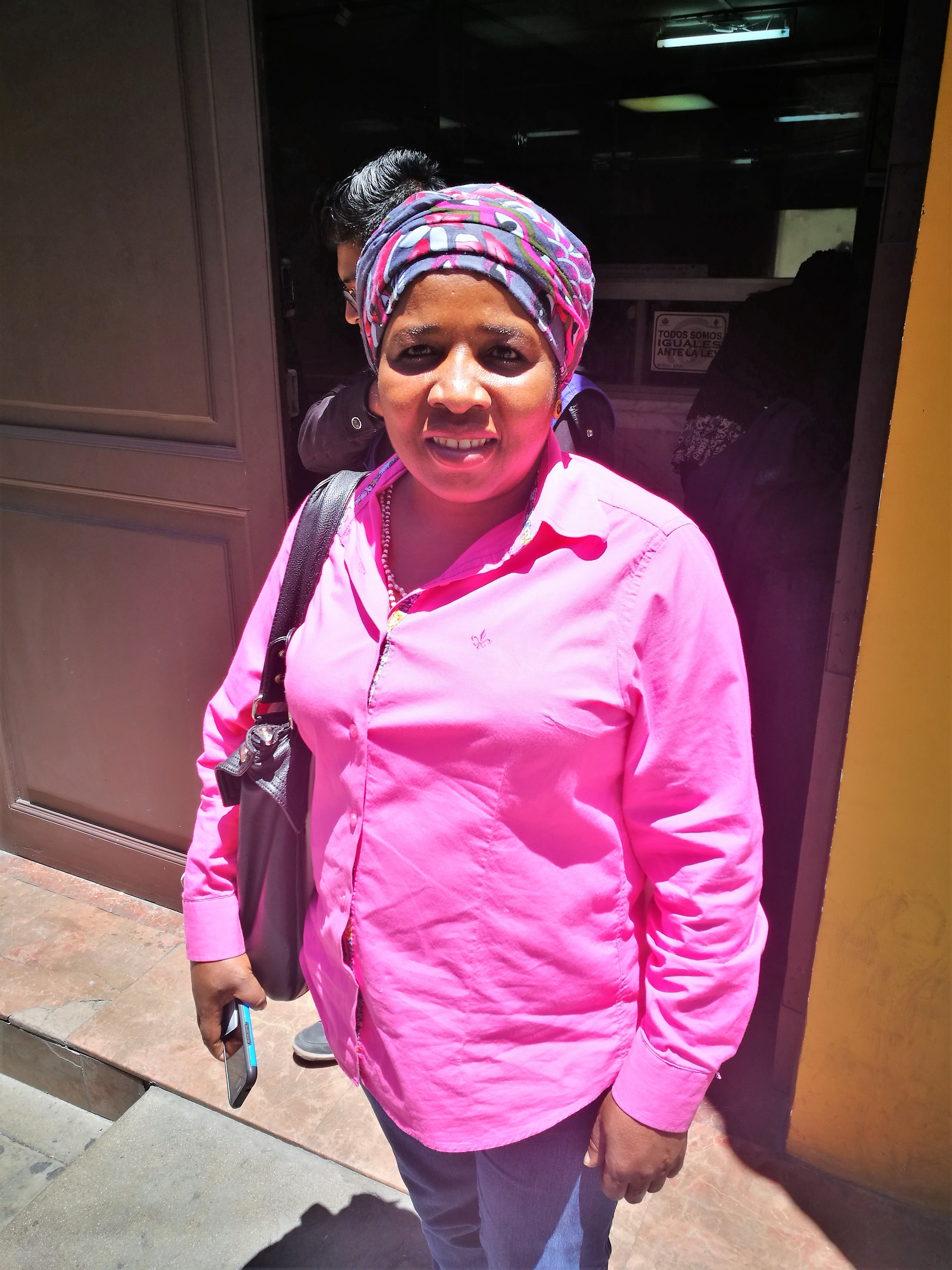
- Monica Rey Gutierrez in la Paz, february 2017
- Born: Adalberta Mónica Rey Gutiérrez; 23 April 1964 (age 60); Comunidad Marca, Nor Yungas Province, La Paz Department, Bolivia
- Occupations: Activist; educator; politician
- Years active: 1989-present
- Known for: Afro-Bolivian activism

Adalberta Mónica Rey Gutiérrez (born 23 April 1964) is an Afro-Bolivian cultural leader and activist whose anthropological research helped pass legislation for formal recognition of Afro-Bolivians as an ethnic category in the census of the country. After serving as an educator and cultural activist for many years, she went to work in the government. She is currently a supranational delegate in the Plurinational Legislative Assembly of Bolivia.

== Early life ==
Adalberta Mónica Rey Gutiérrez was born on 23 April 1964 in Comunidad Marca, of the Nor Yungas Province, La Paz Department, Bolivia. She was raised in the Comunidad Santa Ana, near Coroico by her mother, Florentina Gutiérrez Barra, and step-father, Simeón Rey Barra. Rey moved to La Paz when she was eleven and continued her schooling at the boarding school Hogar y Colegio Ave María. She was the first Afro-Bolivian to graduate with a high school diploma from the school. Rey continued her education at the Higher University of San Andrés (Spanish: Universidad Mayor de San Andrés (UMSA))and earned a bachelor's degree in social communications in 1997. Her thesis, La Saya como medio de comunicación y expresión cultural en la comunidad Afroboliviana (Saya as Mode of Communication and Cultural Expression in the Afro-Bolivian Community) was the first substantial work which had been extensively researched which analyzed the Afro-Bolivian segment of the population. In interviews with community elders, Rey discovered that members of the Yungas communities still had songs and ceremonies performed in African languages. The thesis evaluated the importance of saya, a unique song and dance tradition to the identity of Afro-Bolivians, confirming that it was not a musical performance, but an integral part of their cultural expression. It became an important reference for both researchers who followed, and journalists.

While still in college, Rey emerged as one of the leaders of the identity movement of Afro-Bolivians, which at that time was made up mostly of young people who had moved from the countryside to the capital for education or work. They began performing saya at public events and gained official recognition of their organization, the Afro-Bolivian Saya Cultural Movement (Spanish: Movimiento Cultural Saya Afroboliviana (MCSA)), which was created in 1989 to revive and assert the cultural traditions of Afro-Bolivians. One of their first successes was to replace the vernacular way of referencing the people of African descent in Bolivia from being called negritos (dear/cute little blacks) or morenos (dark-colored people) to Afroboliviano, recognizing that blacks were a distinct ethnic group but also Bolivian. In 1994, she led a march on the presidential palace to gain recognition for Afro-Bolivians. Rey, one of the founders of the organization, served as president of MCSA from 1996 to 2001.

== Career ==
Almost immediately after her graduation, Rey began working with a group of team members on a project sponsored by the Inter-American Development Bank to conduct research and survey conditions throughout the country effecting the Afro-Bolivian population. Their findings reported as, Diagnóstico de la situación del pueblo negro en Bolivia (Diagnostic of the Situation of the Black Community in Bolivia), estimated for the first time the size of that segment of the population to be around 20,000. Another booklet, El tambor mayor (The main drum), written in conjunction with the Fundación Simón y Patiño, was produced in 1998 by Rey, who coordinated a group effort written on the culture and history of Afro-Bolivians. That same year, Rey took a position in the General Directorate of Archaeology and Anthropology, leaving after one year to teach at the Franz Tamayo Private University (UniFranz). After five years, she left UniFranz and in 2004 began teaching at her alma mater, UMSA.

Between 1990 and 2009, Rey participated in and led workshops at many international events related to the African diaspora traveling to Argentina, Brazil, Colombia, Ecuador, Honduras, Panama, Peru, the United States, Uruguay and Venezuela. She also served as the Bolivian representative at numerous meetings of African American organizations throughout the continent. In 2009, Rey accepted a post in the Ministry of Culture became the Director General of the Fight Against Racism within the Vice-Ministry of Decolonization. The following year, she became an advisor to the Office of the Ministry of Productive Development and Plural Economy and at the same time, Afro-Bolivians were allowed to participate in the government and as part of the Departmental Council. They formed the National Council of Afro-Bolivians (Spanish: Consejo Nacional del Afroboliviano (Conafro)) on which Rey served as secretary of communication and international relations. In 2012, for the first time Bolivians of African descent were enumerated on the national population census as a specific ethnic group. Census data, which counted citizens over age fifteen, showed that the Afro-Bolivian sector represented 16,329 people compared to the 10 million people in the entire population.

In 2014 Rey became Director General of Consumer Protection in the Ministry of Productive Development and was elected as supranational deputy in the Chamber of Deputies of the administration of President Evo Morales. She introduced legislation in 2016 to protect the human and civil rights of the African community in Bolivia including anti-discrimination provisions.

Rey has published articles both nationally and internationally in journals as well as having been the subject of interview for other researchers and journalists on Afro-Bolivian themes. She is one of the few authors who have created major reference works on Afro-Bolivian people.
