= Caranavi Province =

Caranavi
- Province
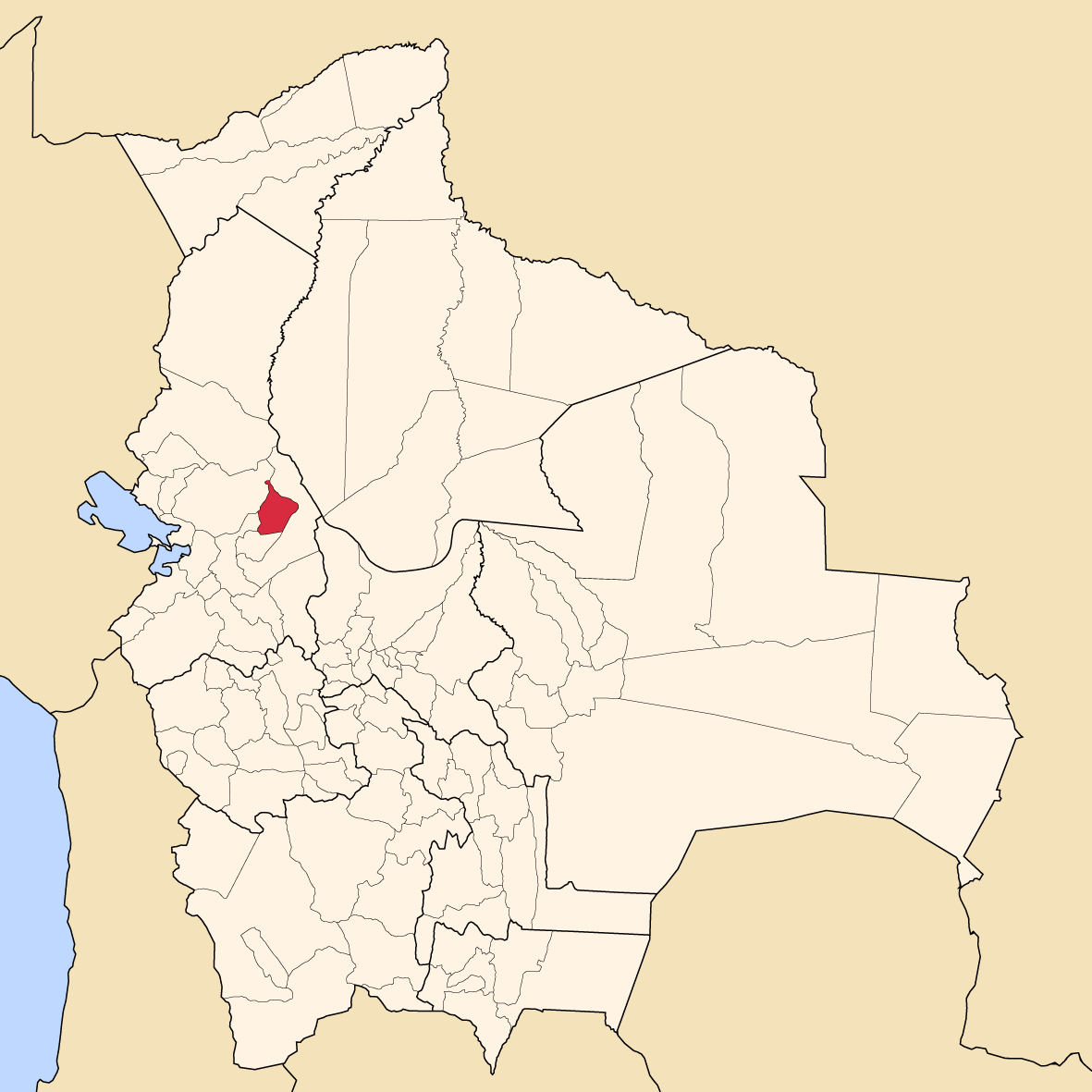
- Location of Caranavi Province within Bolivia

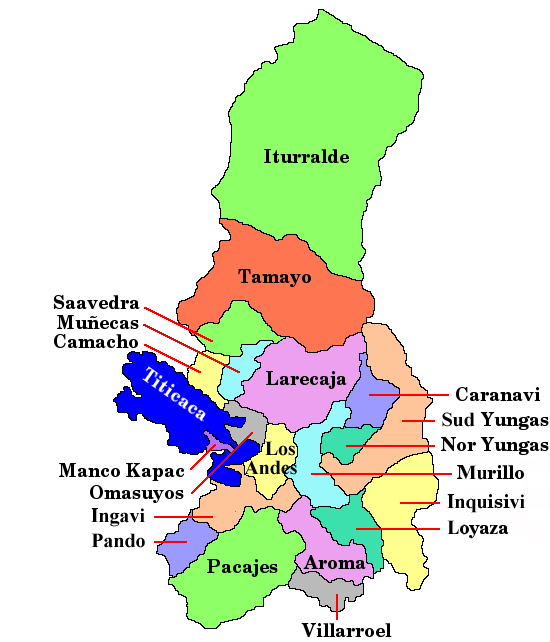
- Provinces of the La Paz Department
- Coordinates: 15°40′0″S 67°25′0″W
- Country: Bolivia
- Department: La Paz Department
- Municipalities: 2
- Established: 1992
- Capital: Caranavi

Area
  - Total: 3,400 km^{2} (1,300 sq mi)

Population (2024 census)
  - Total: 69,533
  - Density: 20/km^{2} (53/sq mi)
- Time zone: UTC-4 (BOT)

Caranavi Province is one of the twenty provinces of the Bolivian La Paz Department and is situated in the department's eastern parts. The province was created by Law 1401 on 16 December 1992 from a portion of what was then Nor Yungas Province. The creation of the province had been a local cause embraced by Ramiro Revuelta, a Deputy in the national legislature who was assassinated on November 28, 1992.

== Location ==
Caranavi Province is located between 15° 20' and 16° 03' South and between 67° 07' and 67° 42' West. It extends over 55 km from West to East, and 75 km from North to South.

The province is situated on the Bolivian Altiplano east of Lake Titicaca, on the headwaters of Río Beni, and borders Larecaja Province and in the Northwest, Pedro Domingo Murillo Province in the Southwest, Nor Yungas Province in the South, and Sud Yungas Province in the East and Northeast.

== Population ==
The population of Caranavi Province has increased by circa 40% over the recent two decades:

- 1992: 43,093 inhabitants (census)
- 2001: 51,153 inhabitants (census)
- 2005: 56,167 inhabitants (est.)
- 2010: 59,090 inhabitants (est.)

40.6% of the population are younger than 15 years old. (1992)

The literacy rate of the population is 83.1%. (1992)

92.7% of the population speak Spanish, 71.6% speak Aymara, and 11.1% Quechua. (1992)

88.7% of the population have no access to electricity, 65.6% have no sanitary facilities. (1992)

68.0% of the population are Catholics, 22.9% are Protestants. (1992)

== Economy ==
As of 2003, Caranavi is the main source for Bolivian coffee production and supplies organic coffee to the national and world market.

== Division ==
Since 23 December 2009, the province is divided into two municipalities which are further subdivided into 21 cantons.

| Section | Municipality | Seat |
|---|---|---|
| 1st | Caranavi Municipality | Caranavi |
| 2nd | Alto Beni Municipality | Caserío Nueve |

At the time of its creation in 1992, the province consisted of fourteen cantons: Caranavi, Choro, Taypilaya, Santa Fe, Alcoche, Villa Elevacion, Inca Huara De Ckullu Kuchu, Carrasco Uyunense, Inicua, Santa Ana de Alto Beni, San Pablo, Chojña, Santa Rosa, Belen and Eduardo Abaroa.
