= Chicaloma =

- Town
- Location within Bolivia
- Coordinates: 16°27′S 67°29′W
- Country: Bolivia
- Department: La Paz Department
- Province: Sud Yungas Province
- Municipality: Irupana Municipality
- Canton: Chicaloma Canton

Population (2001)
  - Total: 634
- Time zone: UTC-4 (BOT)

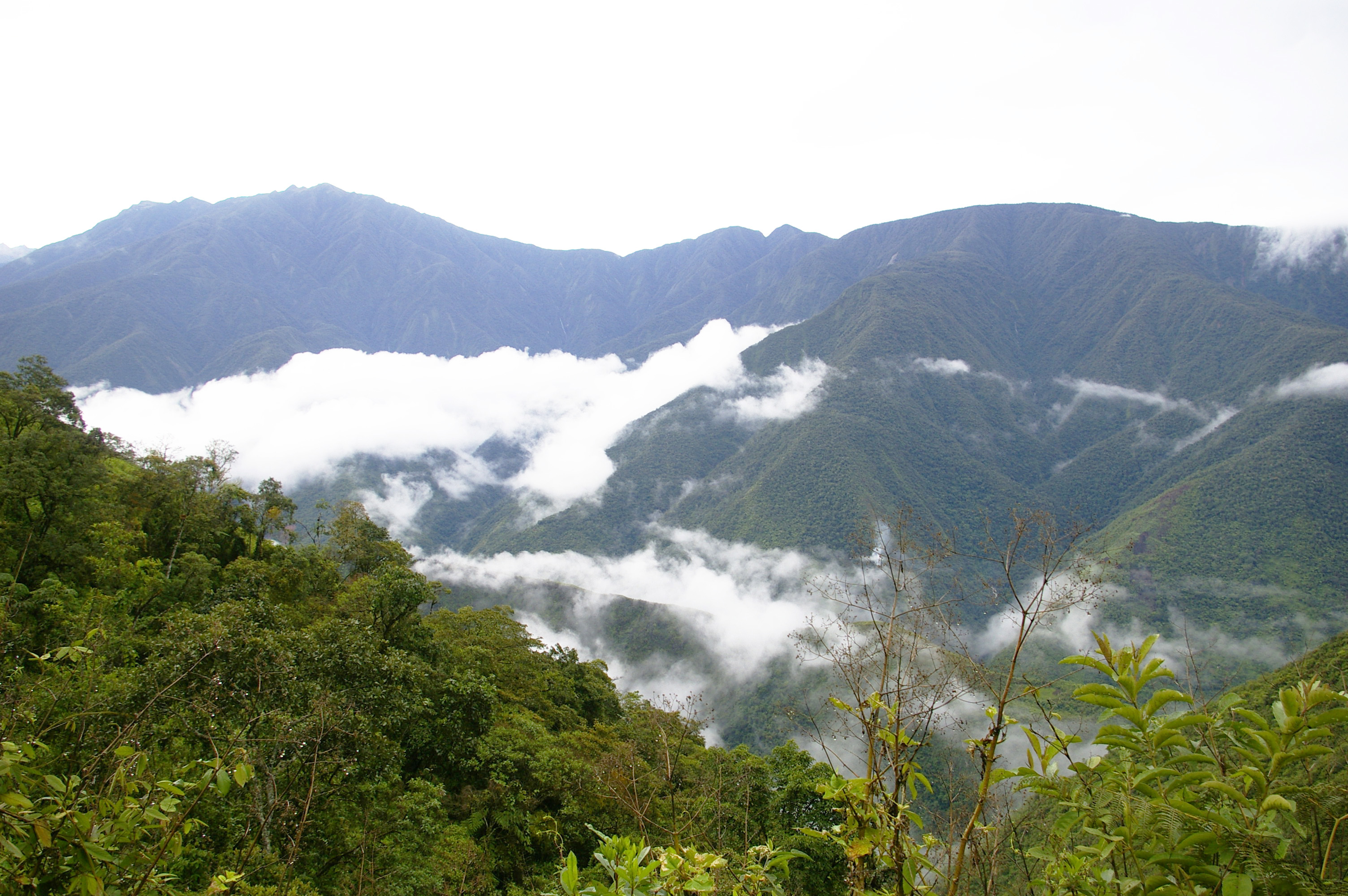

Chicaloma is a location in the La Paz Department in Bolivia. It is the seat of the Chicaloma Canton, one of the six cantons of the Irupana Municipality in the Sud Yungas Province. In 2009 it had an estimated population of 783.
