= List of senators of La Paz =

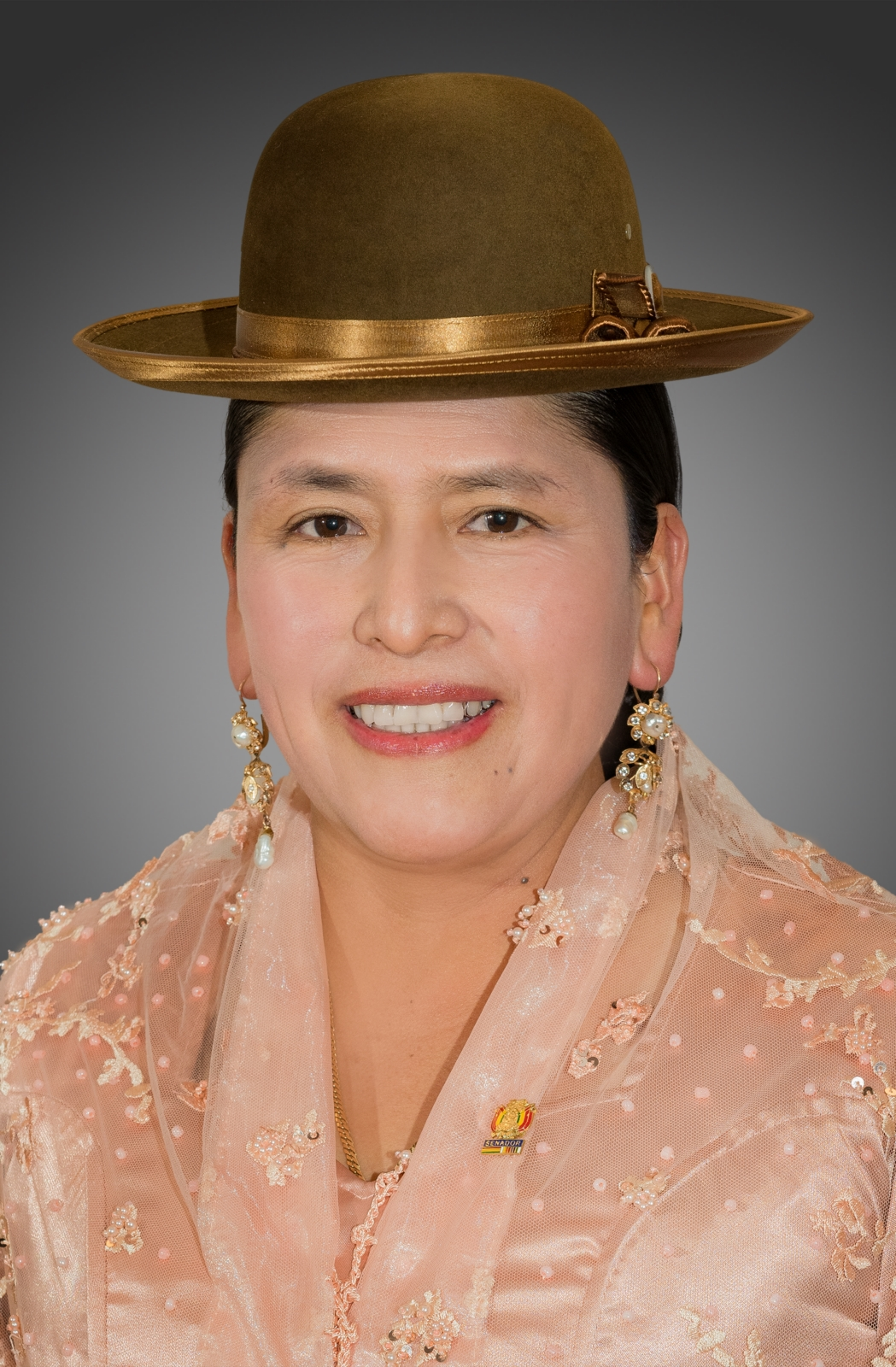
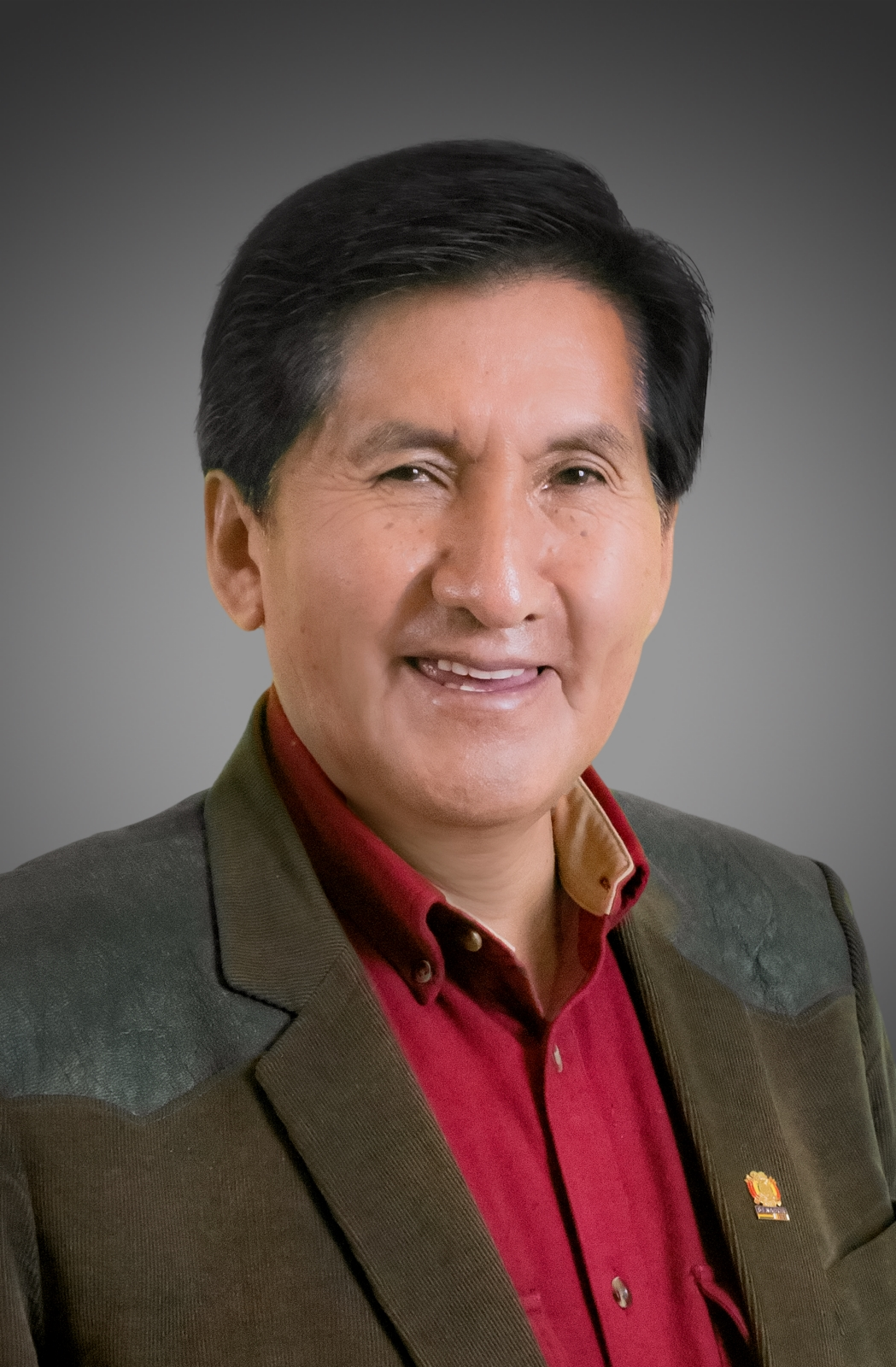
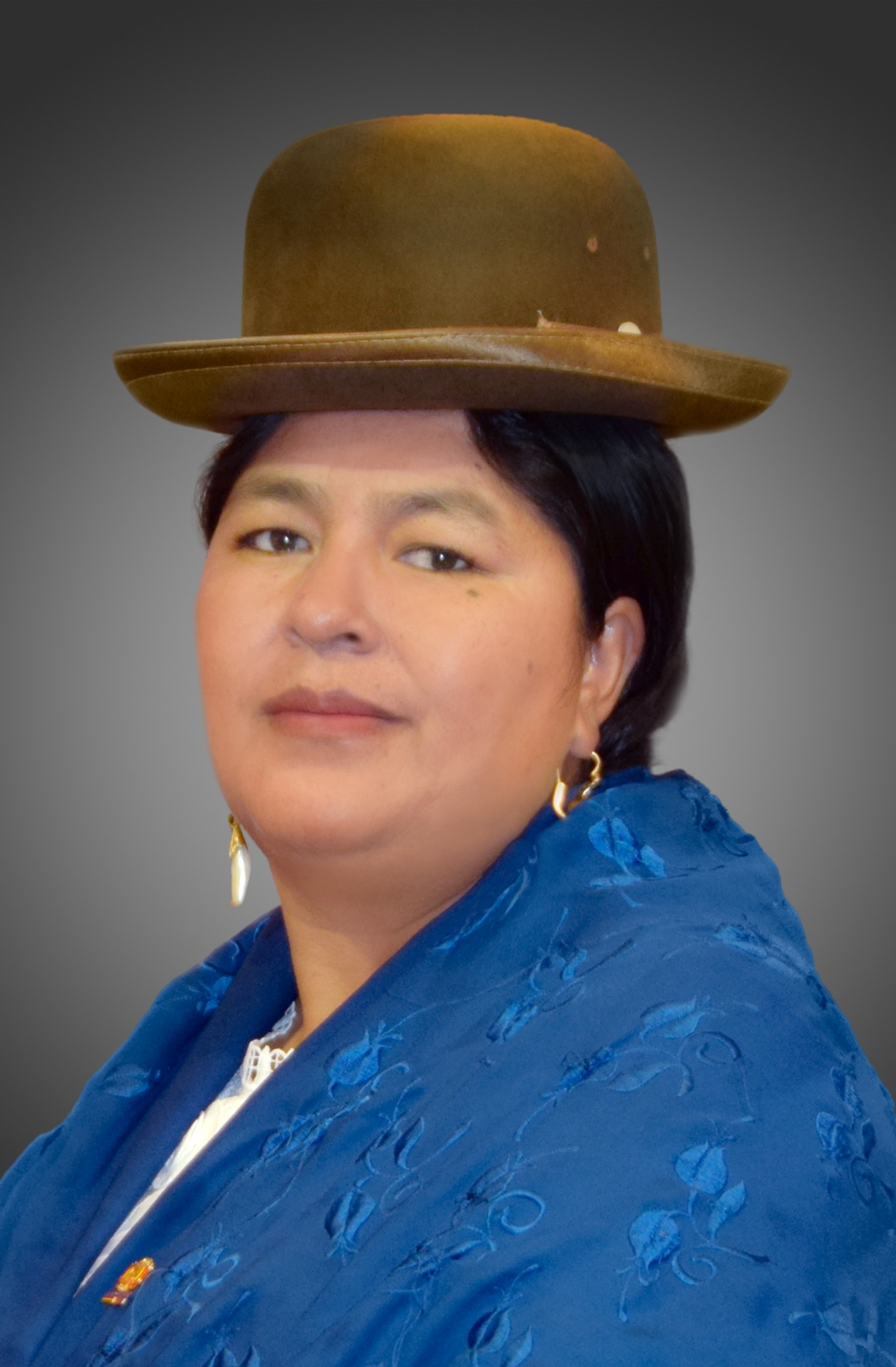
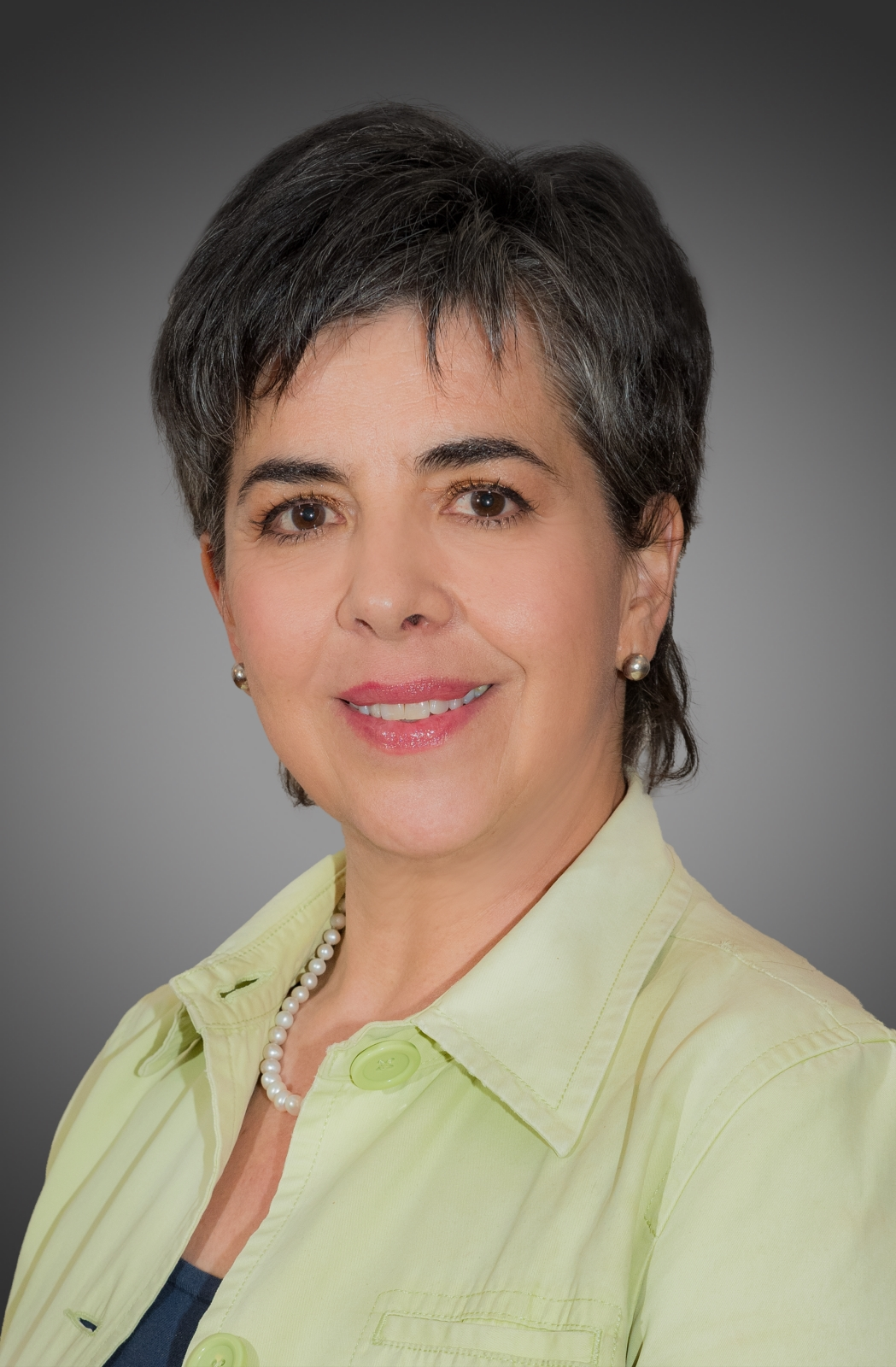
From left to right, top to bottom: Virginia Velasco (MAS), Félix Ajpi (MAS), Simona Quispe (MAS), and Cecilia Requena (CC).

La Paz is represented in the Plurinational Legislative Assembly by four senators and their substitutes elected through proportional representation. They serve five-year terms and qualify for reelection indefinitely. The current delegation comprises three senators from the Movement for Socialism (MAS-IPSP) and one from Civic Community (CC): Virginia Velasco, Félix Ajpi, Simona Quispe, and Cecilia Requena. Their respective substitutes are: Hilarión Padilla, Yolanda Ponce, Guido Varela, and Porfirio Menacho. Although the bicameral system was adopted in the 1831 Constitution and was maintained in subsequently promulgated constitutions, it can be affirmed that with the exception of very small intervals, the Senate did not, in fact, exercise its functions until the convocation of the 1882 legislature. Furthermore, due to heavy political instability and frequent military interventions since 1882, Bolivia did not experience a continuous, uninterrupted legislative session until 1982.

== List of senators ==
Legislature	L.	Senator	Party	Term of office		Substitute	Party	Term of office		E.	Caucus	Ref.	
Legislature	L.	Senator	Party	Took office	Left office	Substitute	Party	Took office	Left office	E.	Caucus	Sen.	Sub.
2020–2025	1°	Virginia Velasco	MAS	3 November 2020	Incumbent	Hilarión Padilla	MAS	9 November 2020	Incumbent	2020	MAS		
2020–2025	2°	Félix Ajpi	MAS	3 November 2020	Incumbent	Yolanda Ponce	MAS	9 November 2020	Incumbent	2020	MAS		
2020–2025	3°	Simona Quispe	MAS	3 November 2020	Incumbent	Guido Varela	MAS	9 November 2020	Incumbent	2020	MAS		
2020–2025	1°	Cecilia Requena	CC	3 November 2020	Incumbent	Porfirio Menacho	CC	9 November 2020	Incumbent	2020	CC		
