= Acullico =

Bolus of coca placed between the cheek and jaw

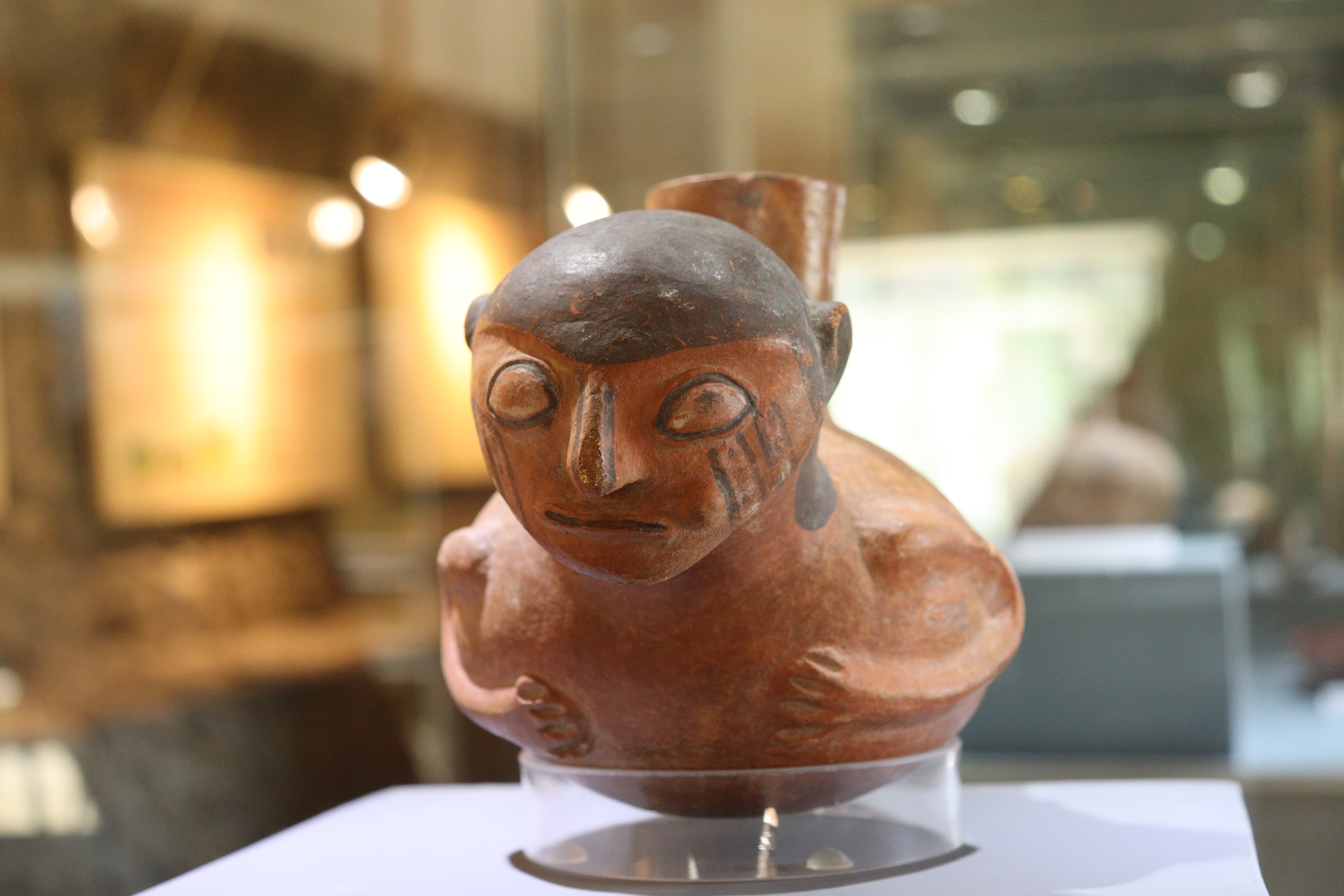
Ceramic bowl with a "volador" with ball of coca in their mouth

Acullico, chacchado, akulliku, acuyico (quechua word akullikuy), acusi, pijcho or mascada is a social, ritual and medicinal practice where a small bolus of coca is placed in the mouth between the cheek and jaw. It is a practice of various regions in South America, such as Northwest Argentina, Western Bolivia, Peru, Chile, Ecuador and Colombia to reduce altitude sickness due to the lack of oxygen in the atmosphere in high altitudes, and reduce fatigue, hunger and indigestion.

== Consumption ==
Usually, the coca leaves are chewed alongside a small amount of an alkaline substance, such as bicarbonate of soda, lime or the ashes of a plant known natively as 'lejía', 'llipta', or 'yista' when it is quinoa, in order to increase its bioavailability.
