= Caranavi =

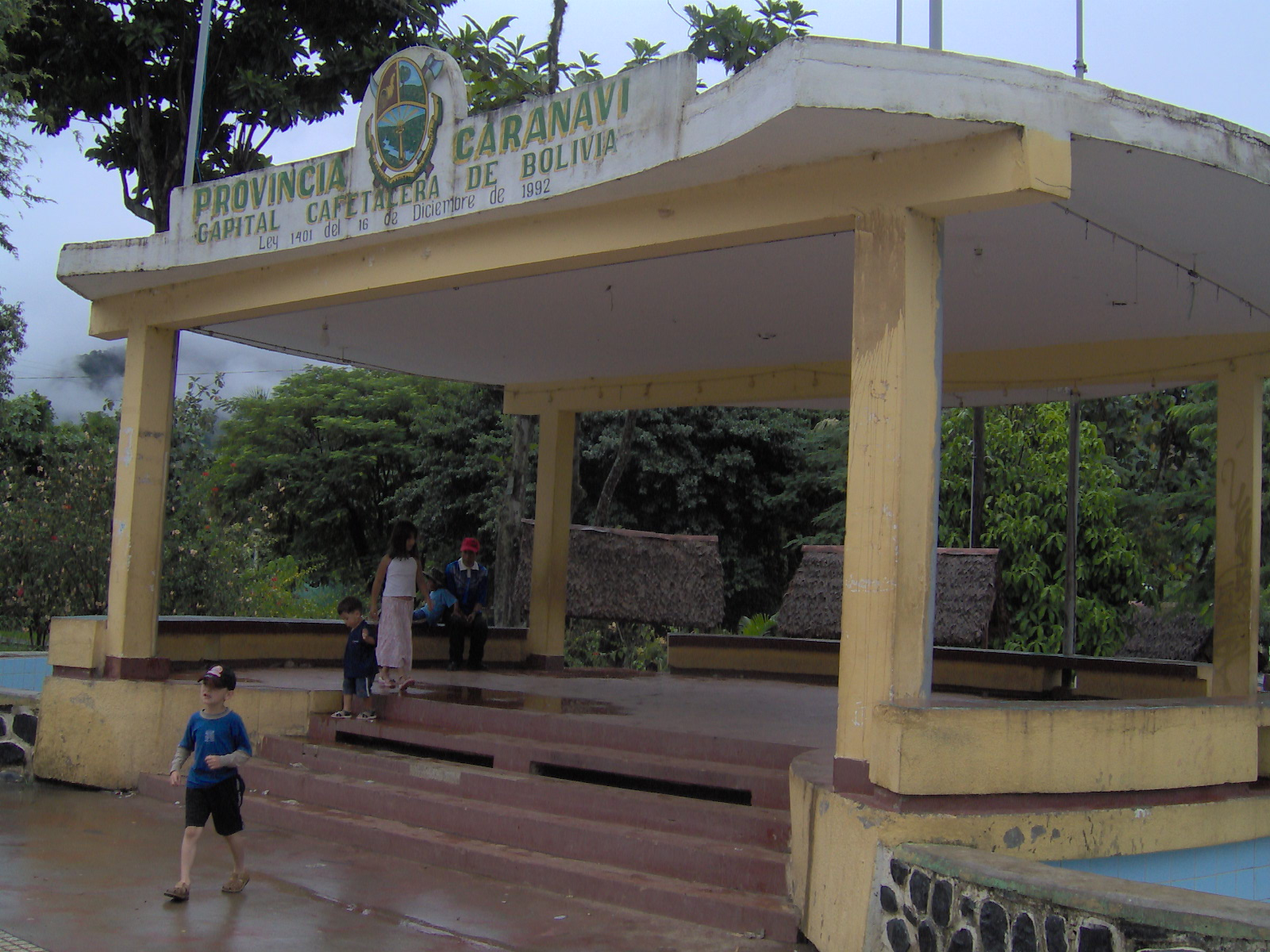
- Main square in Caranavi

- Location in Bolivia
- Coordinates: 15°50′S 67°34′W
- Country: Bolivia
- Department: La Paz Department
- Province: Caranavi Province
- Municipality: Caranavi Municipality
- Elevation: 976 m (3,202 ft)

Population (2024)
  - Total: 69.000
- Time zone: UTC-4 (BOT)
- Climate: Aw
- Sources: Google Maps

Caranavi is the capital of the Caranavi Province in the Yungas region of Bolivia.

On 23 December 2009, part of the province was detached from the municipality of Caranavi to become the municipality of Alto Beni.

== Sister City ==
Caranavi sister city is:

- Caruaru, Brazil (Since 2002)

== Geography ==
Caranavi is north of Coroico, on the National Route 3 highway from La Paz to Rurrenabaque. It is in mountainous terrain at the confluence of the Yara and Coroico Rivers.
