= Saya (art form) =

Afro-Bolivian music and dance

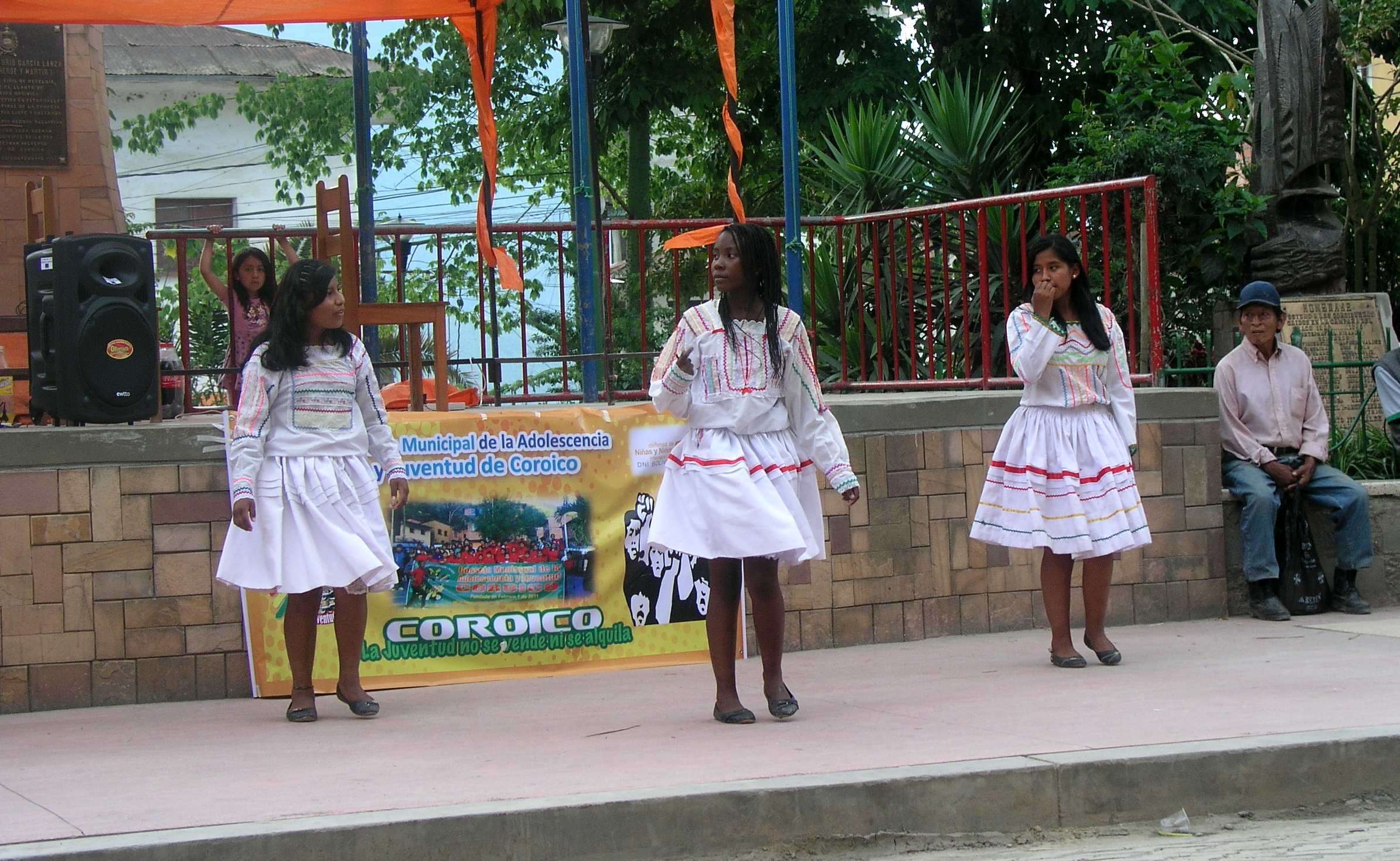
Young dancers in Coroico, Bolivia

The saya is an Afro-Bolivian music and dance originating from the Yungas region. It is considered a key influence in the music of Bolivia. The term saya is of unknown origin, with some positing that it may have come from Latin or Kikongo.

The saya is often compared to the caporales dance, which was developed in the late 1960s and is not Afro-Bolivian. The caporales depicts the caporal (slave overseer or foreman). The comparison may occur due to confusion with naming, as the music and rhythms of caporales are sometimes referred to as saya.

== Background ==
Enslaved Africans were taken to South America to work in a range of industries. Their customs, music, was merged with the native cultures gave rise to mixtures. The specific history of many of these practices has disappeared, but many authors have worked to identify cultural survivals in Afro-descended groups throughout South America.

Many dances have been derived from the saya. Caporales was based on these dances, created and presented to the public for the first time in 1969 by the Estrada brothers who were inspired in the Afro-Bolivian saya character of the Caporal. This character was, in turn, inspired by the foreman on the haciendas of the Yungas.

In the present day, Afro-Bolivians have used the saya in their struggle to reclaim their rights within Bolivian society. In this movement, the saya has functioned both as a way of expressing and solidifying Afro-Bolivian identity among black Bolivians, and as a way to express their identity in the context of national social movements based on ethnic identities.

== Dances derived from the saya ==
In Caporales, the male dancer looks near identical to his Caporal counterpart. However, while the Caporal outfit is usually larger and constricting, a saya uniform is usually made from lighter material and fitted to the body for better, more fluid arm movement. Sometimes a whip may be used like in Caporales, but this is the exception and is more popular to dance simply with white or black gloves (depending on the uniform colors). Female dancers also have a more fitted and relaxed outfit compared to their Caporal counterparts. The differences in that case, however, are more subtle (lighter material, less skirt, laced sleeves, etc.)

The Caporales is usually considered very masculine: men will move and use their arms with much emphasis on looking strong and "macho". Women, while emulating the men's moves, will simply concentrate on showing off their legs and skirts in a flirtatious manner.

The rhythms of all of these dances are different from the saya as well as the whole dance. Caporales is especially appreciated by young people of the middle and upper class who form huge Caporales groups for Carnival, Gran Poder and other "entradas".
