= Virginia Velasco =

Bolivian lawyer and politician

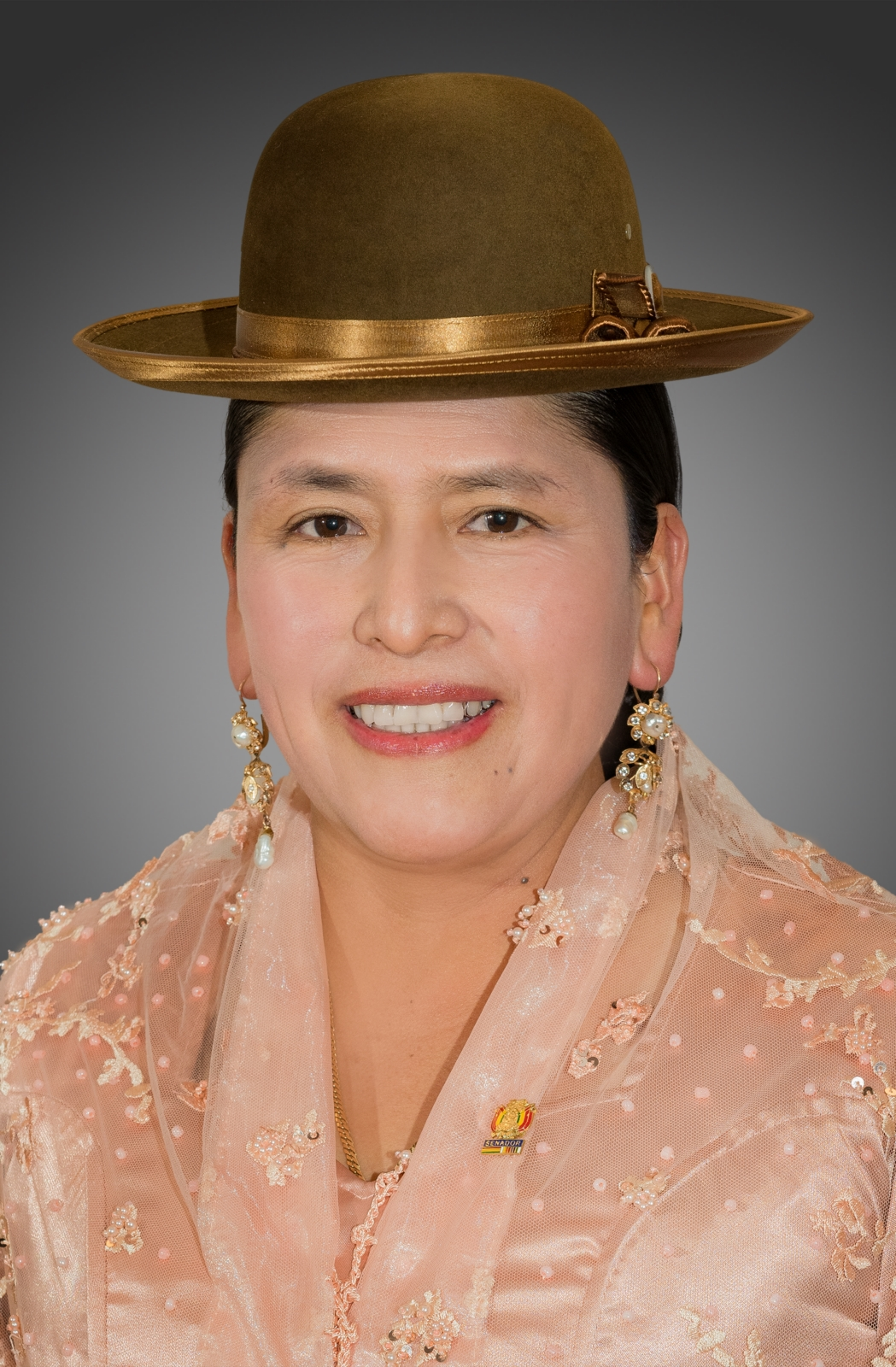

Personal details
- Born: October 11, 1980 (age 45) La Paz, Bolivia
- Party: Movimiento al Socialismo

Virginia Velasco Condori (born October 11, 1980) is a Bolivian lawyer and politician. She began her political career as the sixth Minister of Justice and Human Rights under President Evo Morales. Velasco would later become a senator for the department of La Paz, representing it since 2020.

== Biography ==
Virginia Velasco was born on October 11, 1980, in the town of Caicoma in the municipality of Laja in the province of Los Andes in the department of La Paz . She began her school studies in 1986, graduating high school in 1997. Subsequently, she continued with her higher education, entering the Law program at the Salesiana University of Bolivia, graduating as a lawyer by profession in 2014.

During her working life, Velasco worked as a lawyer in free practice, venturing into various are as of the profession as a defender of the rights of indigenous women.

She was appointed Minister of Justice by President Evo Morales Ayma in 2015, serving until 2017, when she was succeeded by Héctor Enrique Arce Zaconeta. During her tenure as Minister of Justice, she promoted a series of inclusion policies in justice, as well as substantial changes in Bolivian justice, highlighting during her tenure the justice summit held on June 10, 2016, in the city of Sucre.

=== 2024 Bolivian Coup Attempt ===
On 26 June 2024, General Juan José Zúñiga, commander of the Bolivian Army, attempted a coup d'état by sending troops to seize Plaza Murillo in La Paz, the country's administrative capital, and storming the Casa Grande del Pueblo, the presidential palace. Condori spoke to reporters outside the Plurinational Legislative Assembly accusing Morales of being behind the coup attempt. She stated that “The guilty party here is Mr. Evo Morales, he is behind this coup d’état".
