= Alto Beni Municipality =

- Municipality
- Flag

- Location of the Alto Beni Municipality within Bolivia
- Coordinates: 15°48′0″S 67°12′0″W
- Country: Bolivia
- Department: La Paz Department
- Province: Caranavi Province
- Incorporated (municipality): 23 December 2009
- Seat: Caserío Nueve

Government
  - Mayor: Joaquín Benito Mamani (MAS-IPSP; 2010)
- Time zone: UTC-4 (BOT)

Alto Beni Municipality is a municipality of the Caranavi Province in the La Paz Department, Bolivia. Its seat is Caserío Nueve. It was created by Law 4131 on 23 December 2009, and contains 160 communities, 12 of which are characterized as urban.
