= Ngeye Clan =

Clan of Buganda kingdom

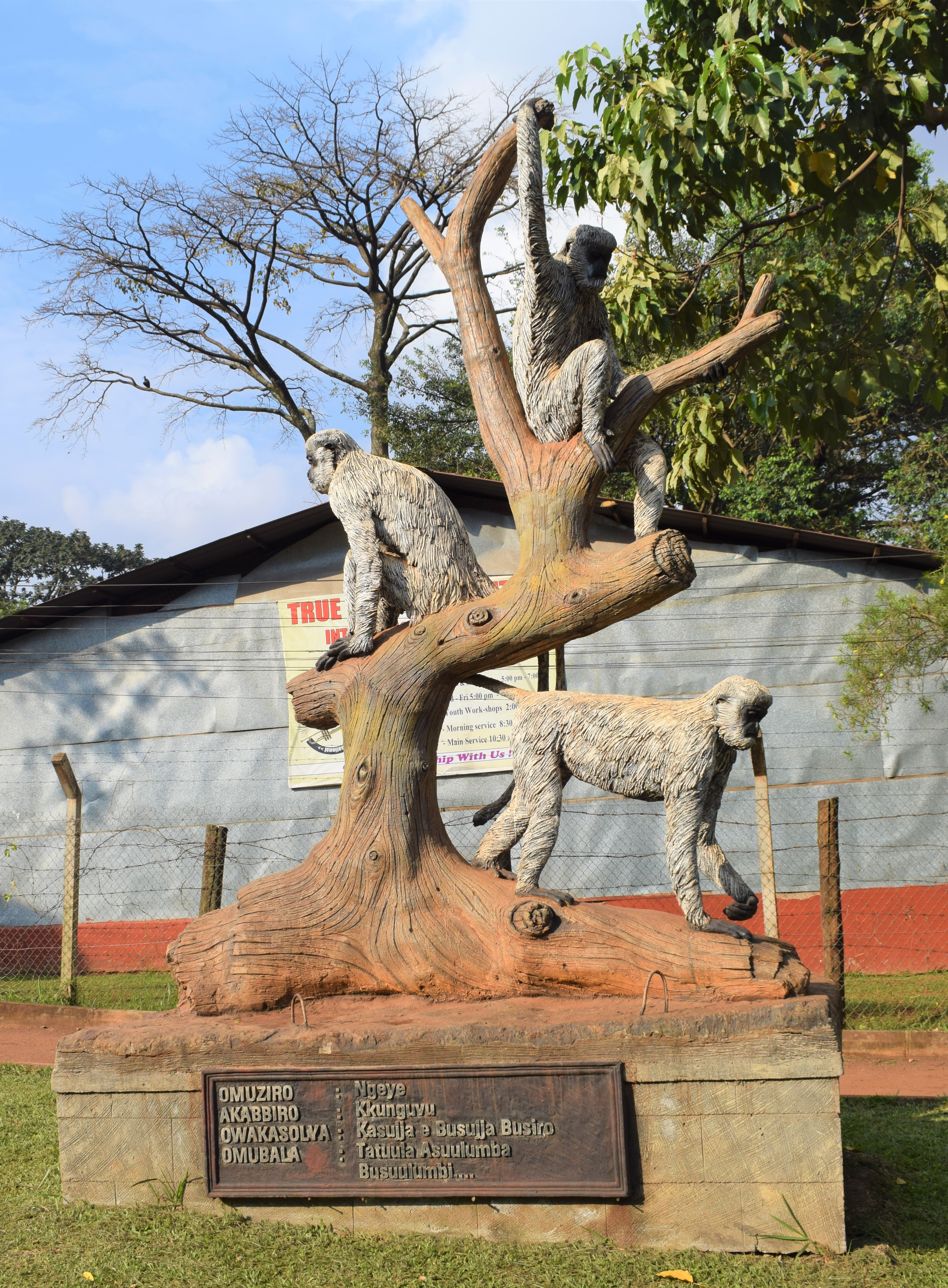
The sculpture shows the symbol of the Ngeye Clan Totem located in Mengo, Kampala.

Ngeye Clan is one of the many clans of the present day Buganda Kingdom. Ngeye is a Luganda word which means colobus monkey. The Clan Leader is given the title Kasujja and the current Kasujja is Omutaka Kyesimba Kakande Kibirige Sheba . Engeye is one of the clans Kintu found already established in Buganda Kingdom. Bakazirwendo Ssemandwa is the grandfather of the Ngeye Clan.

== Origin ==
After Kintu had overthrown Bemba, he could not be crowned King without a wife from Buganda which was a law of the Buganda land. He then went to Kiwumu, Bumpenje in Busiro to the home Bakazirwendo Ssemandwa to seek hand in marriage of his beautiful daughter Nambi Nantuttululu. Despite the clan descending from Bakazirwendo, the clan head is not addressed by that title. After being banished from Bunyoro Kingdom, Prince Kalemeera left with his maternal uncle Kyesimba, son of Bakazirwendo who was a specialist in treating fever. He had treated Kings and chiefs before which was a reason why he went with because of his expertise in curing of fever.

After Kalemeera passed on, Kyesimba became Prince Kimera's medicine man. He was also among the people who escorted him to be crowned King in Buganda from Bunyoro Kingdom.His wide knowledge in medicine and ability to cure fever, Kimera gave him the name Kasujja meaning fever and a village Busujja because of treating the disease well. Kyesimba was a favourite of Kabaka Kimera due to the long history they shared. When Kyesimba 's father Bakazirwendo noticed this friendship, he handed the clan over to his son as an honor of the friendship.

== Totem and symbols ==
The primary totem(omuziro )of the Ngeye clan is the colobus monkey( Engeye), while its secondary totem(akabiro) is Kkunguvvu, another monkey species. Totems serve as symbols of unity, ancestry, and cultural identity in abauganda society, and clan members traditionally avoid harming or eating their totem animal

The clan motto ( omubala) is'' Tatuula tatuula asuulumba busuulumbi, ttutu lifumita likyali tto''

== Clan Role ==
The official duty of the Ngeye Clan was to supply the Kabaka with a Chief butler who was called Ddumba and a man in charge of the King's drinking water called Kalinda. Unfortunately Kalinda was put to death when the King died. They also supplied the King with the Royal Potter called Ssedagala who made the King's cooking pots.

== Clan leadership ==
The clan head carries the title Kasujja, a hereditary position passed down generations. The current clan head is Omutaka Kasujja Kyesimba Kakande Kibirige Sheba

The Kasujja oversees clan affairs, preserves cultural traditions, and represents the clan in Buganda's traditional governance system.

== Clan headquarters ==
The clan headquarters is located at Busujju, Busiro County, Buganda Kingdom.

Clan headquarters serve as cultural centers where clan meetings, ceremonies, and ancestral rituals are held.

== Popular male names ==
Kalule, Kibirige, Nnaluswa, Ssebunya, Ssebugenyi, Mugga, Muyingo, Kakande, Buwembo, Kalungi, Kasimbi, Settaala, Kasule, Ggingo, Ssemakalu, Kawooya, Bagenda, Kirumira, Kisuule, Ssebayigga, Kalimbwe, Kabuye, Ggoli, Lutwama, Kajimu, Kirunda, Luyombo, Mpoza, Kattante, Ssenfuka, Kayaye, Nalwasa, Namungo, Majanja, Mukono, Kayiza, Kalungi, Kabuyaga, Lukenge, Kakande

== Popular female names ==
Nanfuka, Nakayiza, Nabunnya, Nambajwe, Nambirige, Namugga, Nalukenge, Nakitto, Nakakande, Nabuwembo, Naggayi, Nakabuye, Nakawooya, Nampoza, Nannungi, Nattabi, Nakubulwa, Namazzi, Nakayiza,

== Cultural significance ==
The clan system remains central to Buganda culture, regulating social relations, preserving genealogy, and supporting traditional governance.

== Information about Ngeye clan ==
Totem	Engeye (Colobus monkey)
Co-totem / Secondary totem	Kkunguvvu
Clan head	Kasujja
Clan seat/Clan headquarters	Busujja in Busiro
Clan slogan / drum beat	Tatuula..tatuula asuulumba busuulumbi...ttutu lifumita likyali tto
The current Kasujja is	Kyesimba Kakande Kibirige Sheba
The Engeye clan Anthem	

== See also ==
- Buganda Kingdom
- Kato Kintu
- Kimera of Buganda
- Luganda language
- Clans of Buganda
- Totems in Buganda culture
- Busiro county
- Culture of Buganda
