= Chwa I of Buganda =

Kabaka of the Kingdom of Buganda

Ssekabaka Chwa I Nabakka

Kabaka of Buganda
- Reign: mid 14th century
- Predecessor: Kintu of Buganda
- Successor: Kimera of Buganda
- Born: Uganda
- Died: Late 14th Century; Unknown
- Burial: Unknown
- Spouse: 1. Lady Nabukalu; 2. Lady Nakku; 2. Lady Namagembe
- Father: Kintu of Buganda
- Mother: Namasole Nambi Nantuttululu

Chwa I Nabakka (also spelt as Ccwa) was the second Kabaka (King) of the Kingdom of Buganda. He reigned during the mid 14th century. He was the 2nd Kabaka of Buganda.

== Claim to the throne ==
He was the son of Kabaka Kato Kintu, the first Kabaka of Buganda, who reigned in the early 14th century. His mother was Nambi Nantuttululu, of the Ngeye Clan. He ascended to the throne following the death of his father. He established his capital at Bigo Hill.

== Marital life ==
He married two wives:

- Naabakyaala Nakku, the Kaddulubaale, daughter of Walusimbi of the Ffumbe clan. After the death of Kabaka Chwa I, she married Sebwaana, a Regent.
- Nakiwala, daughter of Semwanga, of the Ngonge clan.

== Issue ==
- Prince (Omulangira) Kalemeera, whose mother was Nakiwala. Kalemeera was driven out of Buganda and forced to seek refuge in Bunyoro, on the orders of his father. In Bunyoro, Kalemeera was accommodated at the court of his uncle, Omukama Winyi I of Bunyoro. There, he committed adultery with Lady Wannyana, daughter of Mugalula Buyonga, a Muhima, the chief wife of his uncle. The affair resulted in a son; one Prince Kimera Walusimbi.

== The final years ==
Kabaka Kintu abdicated and settled in Magonga. He is said to have disappeared. To this day, his place of death and burial are unknown. Following his death, there followed a period of Interregnum under the Prime Ministers Walusimbi and his successor, Sebwaana. This period lasted until 1374.

== See also ==
- Kabaka of Buganda
- Winyi of Kibulala

Preceded by Kato Kintu	King of Buganda mid fourteenth century	Succeeded by Kimera Walusimbi
