= Elizabeth Nantale Mulondo =

Ugandan politician, model and princess of the Kingdom of Buganda

Nantale Elizabeth Mulondo
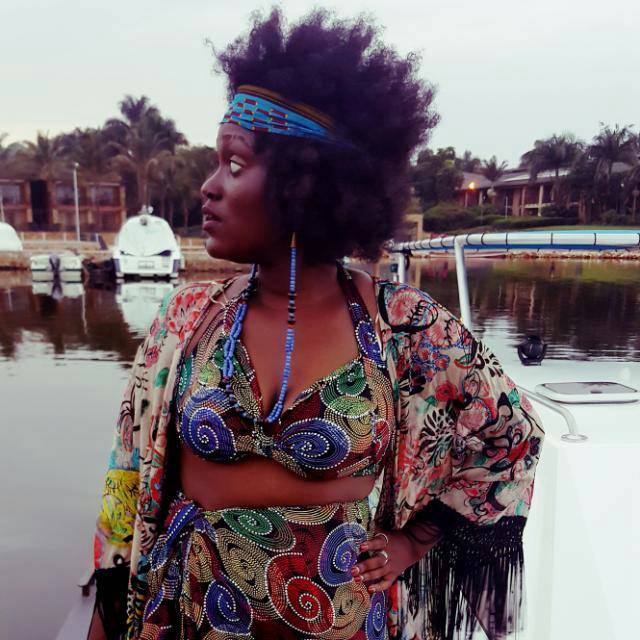
- Born: January 31, 1989 (age 37); Nairobi, Kenya
- Citizenship: Uganda
- Years active: 2008 — present
- Known for: Fashion
- Website: https://princesselizabethnantale.wordpress.com

Nantale Elizabeth (born 31 January 1989) is a princess in the Kingdom of Buganda, a historic kingdom in modern-day Uganda. She is the granddaughter of Daudi Chwa II of Buganda.

== Early life ==
Nantale was born in Nairobi in 1989 to the late Prince Fredrick David Mulondo, son of Prince George William Mawanda chwa, a son to Daudi Chwa II. Prince George William represented Uganda at the Coronation of Queen Elizabeth II and the only Ugandan to be made an honorary member of the Marylebone Cricket Club (MCC) at Lord's Cricket Ground, which prompted him to start and campaign for the African Cricket club. Elizabeth has six brothers and is the family's only girl.

Elizabeth attended Lohana Academy Primary School, in Kololo, Buganda Road High School and Winston Standard Academy. After graduating from secondary school, she earned an associate degree, with honors from Makerere University, a Bachelor of Arts degree from IATA institute, in airline ticketing and reservations and an associate degree with Distinction in Cosmetology.

== Personal life ==
Elizabeth is into fashion, modelling and showbiz. She featured on the Floss magazine front page in 2008 as a model. She often attends fashion shows in Uganda and South Africa and White party in Dubai.

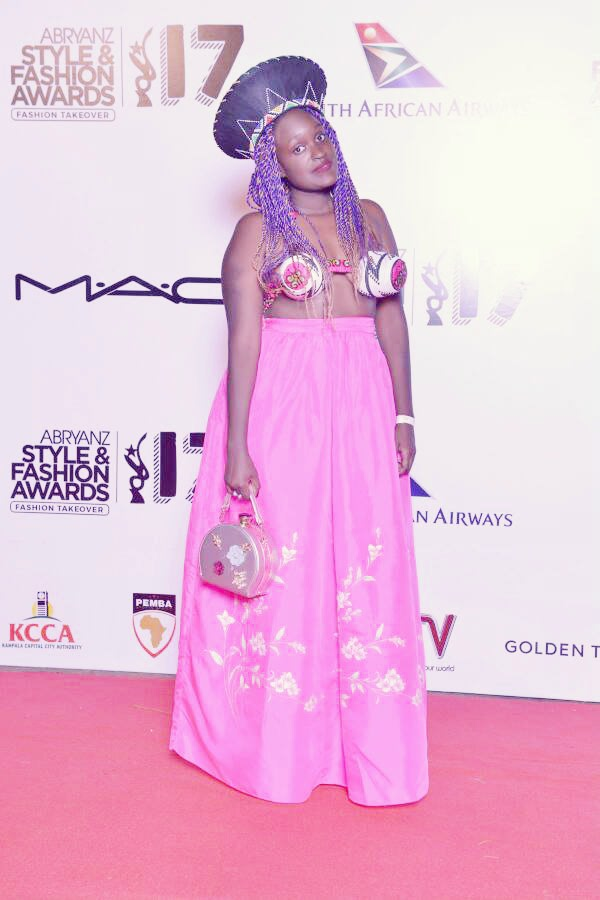
Princess Nantale at the Abryanz Style & Fashion Awards 2017

In 2013 and 2014, Nantale attracted media attention when she was spotted with one of Kampala's tycoons Dick Kizito who is always involved in scandals. Their frequent meetings in which she was provocatively dressed aroused criticism from her family and the public. This prompted her to confront the media and claim that her ex-boyfriend had hired photographers to take embarrassing photos of her. The two eventually reconciled. She is dalways among the Buganda royal family at Kabaka's birthday parties.

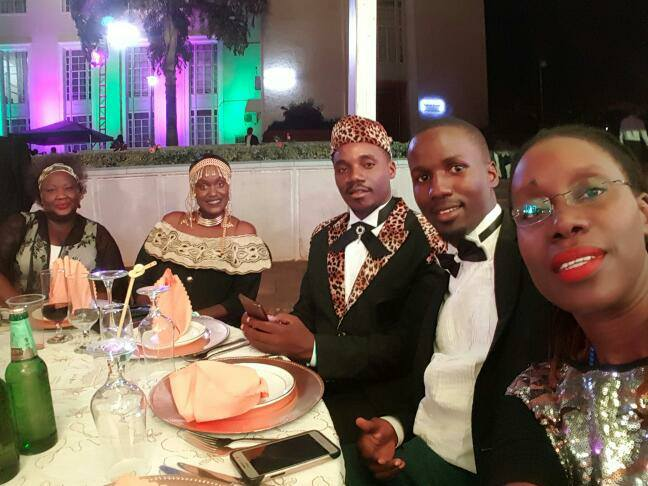
Princess Nantale second left at the Kabaka's Birthday party

== See also ==
- Kingdom of Buganda
- Kabaka of Buganda
- Mulondo of Buganda
