= Kibulala, Ssingo =

- Location in Uganda
- Coordinates: 00°42′41″N 31°55′16″E
- Country: Uganda
- Region: Central Region
- District: Kiboga District
- Elevation: 4,100 ft (1,250 m)

Kibulala, Ssingo, commonly known as Kibulala, is a hill in Ssingo County, Kiboga District in Central Uganda. The hill rises approximately 1,250 metres (4,100 ft) above sea level. The name also applied to the village that sits on top of the hill and the Buganda cultural site located there.

== Location ==
Kibulala is located approximately 20 kilometres (12 mi), by road, northwest of Bukomero, the closest large town and location of the subcounty headquarters. This is approximately 101 kilometres (63 mi), by road, northwest of Kampala, the capital of Uganda, and the largest city in that East African country. The geographical coordinates of Kibulala, Ssingo are:0°42'41.0"N, 31°55'16.0"E (Latitude:0.711389; Longitude:31.921111).

== Overview ==
Kibulala, Ssingo is the location of the burial place of Ssekabaka Wasswa Chwamale Mwanga Winyi, the elder twin brother of Ssekabaka Kato Kintu Kakulukuku, the first Kabaka of Buganda. The descendants of Winyi of Kibulala constitute the Buganda Clan known as Ababiito b'eKibulala. The late monarch's burial site is recognized by the Buganda Royal Clan. Naalinnya Dina Kigga Mukarukidi, a sister to the reigning Buganda King, Kabaka Ronald Muwenda Mutebi II, is culturally assigned to the site.

== See also ==
- Winyi of Kibulala
- Kintu of Buganda
- Kimera of Buganda
- Kabaka of Buganda
