= Kiyimba of Buganda =

Ssekabaka Ntege Kiyimba

Kabaka of Buganda
- Reign: 1464 – 1484
- Predecessor: Kiggala of Buganda
- Successor: Kiggala of Buganda
- Born: Buganda
- Died: 1484; Mpummudde
- Burial: Lukwangu, Busiro
- Spouse: 1. Lady Bamuggya; 2. Lady Gwojjanjaba
- Father: Kiggala of Buganda
- Mother: Namasole Nabukalu

Ntege Kiyimba was Kabaka (King) of the Kingdom of Buganda. He reigned from 1464 to 1484. He was the 6th Kabaka of Buganda.

== Claim to the throne ==
He was the sixth son of Kabaka Kiggala Mukaabya. His mother was Nabukalu, of the Lugave clan, the first wife of Kabaka Kiggala Mukaabya. He ascended the throne around 1464, when his father abdicated. His reign was unpopular as a result of his cruelty. He died before his father did and was consequently succeeded by his father.

== Married life ==
He had two wives but fathered no children from either wife:

- Bamuggya, daughter of Kisuule, of the Njaza clan
- Gwojjanjaba, daughter of Gunju, of the Butiko clan.

== Death ==
He died at Mpummudde and was initially buried at Lukwangu, Busiro. He was succeeded on the throne by his father, around 1484. He is buried at Sentema, Busiro, in modern-day Wakiso District.

== See also ==
- Kabaka of Buganda

Preceded by Kiggala Mukaabya	King of Buganda c.1464–c.1484	Succeeded by Kiggala Mukaabya
