= Kiggala of Buganda =

Ssekabaka Kiggala Mukaabya Kasungubu

Kabaka of Buganda
- Reign: 1434–1464
- Predecessor: Ttembo of Buganda
- Successor: Kiyimba of Buganda
- Reign: 1484–1494
- Predecessor: Kiyimba of Buganda
- Successor: Kayima of Buganda
- Born: Buganda
- Died: 1494
- Burial: Ddambwe, Busiro
- Spouse: 1. Lady Nabukalu; 2. Lady Nakawuka; 3. Lady Nakimera; 4. Lady Nakku; 5. Lady Nakyobula; 6. Lady Nawampamba
- Father: Ttembo of Buganda
- Mother: Namasole Najjemba

Kiggala Sewannaku Mukaabya Kasungubu (died 1494) was Kabaka of the Kingdom of Buganda. He reigned from 1434 until 1464 and from 1484 until 1494. He was the 5th Kabaka of Buganda.

== Claim to the throne ==
He was the eldest son of Kabaka Ttembo, Kabaka of Buganda, by his wife, Najjemba. He ascended to the throne upon the death of his father, around 1434. He established his capital at Kitala Hill. In 1464, he abdicated the throne in favor of his son, Ntege Kiyimba. Kiggala resumed the throne after the death of his son, sometime around 1484. He went blind shortly after the beginning of his second reign. He ruled under the regency of his prime ministers.

== Married life ==
He married six wives as detailed below:

1. Nabukalu Nabuto, daughter of Natiigo, of the Lugave clan
2. Nakawuka, daughter of Senfuma, of the Mamba clan
3. Nakimera, daughter of Masembe, of the Nsenene clan
4. Nakku, daughter of Walusimbi, of the Ffumbe clan
5. Nakyobula, daughter of Mbajja, of the Mamba clan
6. Nawampamba, daughter of Ggunju, of the Butiko clan

== Issue ==
Kabaka Kiggala fathered nine recorded sons:

- Prince (Omulangira) Wasswa, whose mother was Princess Nazibanja
- Prince (Omulangira) Mawempe, whose mother was Princess Nazibanja
- Prince (Omulangira) Semugalwa, whose mother was Princess Nazibanja
- Prince (Omulangira) Bubula, whose mother was Princess Nazibanja
- Prince (Omulangira) Kaggya, whose mother was Princess Nazibanja
- Kabaka Kiyimba Ntege, Kabaka of Buganda, whose mother was Nabukalu
- Prince (Omulangira) Gogombe, whose mother was Nakyobula
- Prince (Omulangira) Kaasameeme, whose mother was Nakawuka
- Prince (Omulangira) Wampamba, whose mother was Nawampamba. He was excluded from the succession for committing incest with his aunt. Prince Wampamba married two wives (a) Lady Nakayima, daughter of his maternal uncle, Gunju, of the Butiko clan and (b) Lady Naabagereka, aunt and wet nurse to his first wife, sister of Gunju, of the Butiko clan. He fathered two sons:
  - Kabaka Kayima Sendikaddiwa, the 7th Kabaka of Buganda, whose mother was Nakayima and
  - Prince (Omulangira) Kyabayinze, whose mother was Naabagereka. Prince Kyabayinze fathered one son:
    - Prince (Omulangira) Juma who unsuccessfully contested the succession with his cousin, Kabaka Nakibinge.

== The final years ==
Kabaka Kiggala Mukaabya Sewannaku Kasungubu died in 1494 of extreme old age and was succeeded on the throne by his grandson, Kayima Sendikaddiwa. He was buried at his capital Manjja and his jaw was buried at Ddambwe, Busiro.

== See also ==
- Kabaka of Buganda

Preceded by Ttembo Kiridde	King of Buganda c.1434–c.1464	Succeeded by Ntege Kiyimba

Preceded by Ntege Kiyimba	King of Buganda c.1484–c.1494	Succeeded by Kayima Ssendikaddiwa
