= Ttembo of Buganda =

Ssekabaka Ttembo

Kabaka of Buganda
- Reign: 1404 – 1434
- Predecessor: Kimera of Buganda
- Successor: Kiggala of Buganda
- Born: Uganda
- Died: 1434; Busiro County
- Burial: Bujuuko, Busiro
- Spouse: Lady Najjemba
- Father: Prince Lumansi of Buganda
- Mother: Namasole Nattembo

Ttembo was Kabaka (King) of the Kingdom of Buganda. He ruled between 1404 and 1434. He was the 4th Kabaka of Buganda.

== Claim to the throne ==
He was the only surviving son of Prince Lumansi, son of Kabaka Kimera. His mother was Nattembo. He killed his grandfather while on a hunting trip by clubbing him on the head. Accounts of the event differ; some say the event was an accident, while others say it was a deliberate act. Ttembo established his capital at Ntinda Hill.

== Married life ==
He married Najjemba, daughter of Semwanga, of the Ngonge clan.

== Issue ==
He fathered three children, two sons and one daughter:

- Kabaka Sewannaku Kiggala Mukaabya Kasungubu, the 5th Kabaka of Buganda, who reigned between 1434 and 1464 and between 1484 and 1494.
- Prince (Omulangira) Lutimba. He was a full-brother of Kabaka Kiggala. He rebelled against his brother but was defeated by his nephews and fled. He died at Wassozi and was buried at Butugu.
- Princess (Omumbejja) Nazibanja. She had several children by her brother Kabaka Kiggala

== The final years ==
Kabaka Ttembo became insane during the latter years of his reign. He died at Busiro and was buried at Katikamu. Other credible sources give his burial place as Bujuuko, Busiro.

Preceded by Kimera	King of Buganda c.1404–c.1434	Succeeded by Kiggala Mukaabya
