= Lubigi Drainage Canal =

Flood-control canal in northwestern Kampala, Uganda

The Lubigi Drainage Canal is a major flood-control canal located in northwestern Kampala, Uganda. It traverses the Lubigi Wetland and forms part of Kampala's primary stormwater drainage network. The canal was developed to improve stormwater conveyance and reduce recurrent flooding in low-lying urban areas of the Ugandan capital.

== History ==
The Lubigi Drainage Canal was upgraded under the Second Kampala Institutional and Infrastructure Development Project (KIIDP II), implemented by the Kampala Capital City Authority with financial support from the World Bank. The project includes widening, desilting and rehabilitating drainage infrastructure to improve the city's resilience to flooding.

== Function ==
The canal collects and conveys stormwater runoff from several urban catchments in Kampala. It is considered one of the city's most important drainage corridors and is intended to mitigate flooding during periods of intense rainfall.

== Environmental concerns ==
Expansion works along the canal have generated concerns regarding wetland degradation, compensation of project-affected persons and the long-term balance between flood control and ecosystem conservation.

== See also ==
- Kampala Capital City Authority
- Lubigi Wetland
