= Jemba of Buganda =

Ssekabaka Jemba Busungwe

Kabaka of Buganda
- Reign: 1564 – 1584
- Predecessor: Mulondo of Buganda
- Successor: Suuna I of Buganda
- Born: Buganda
- Died: 1584; Bubango, Busiro
- Burial: Bubango, Busiro
- Spouse: 1. Lady Nabbanja; 2. Lady Nakkazi; 3. Lady Nanfuka
- Father: Nakibinge of Buganda
- Mother: Namasole Najjemba

Jemba Busungwe (died 1584) was the 10th Kabaka (king) of the Kingdom of Buganda between 1564 and 1584. His reign is remembered as being kind and gentle.

== Claim to the throne ==
He was the son of Kabaka Nakibinge Kagali, Kabaka of Buganda, between 1524 and 1554. His mother was Najjemba, the 2nd wife of his father. He ascended to the throne upon the death of his elder half-brother. He established his capital at Bubango Hill, in what became Busiro Country, in modern-day Wakiso District.

== Married life ==
He had three wives:

- Nabbanja, daughter of Kayiira, of the Mbogo clan
- Nakkazi, daughter of Gabunga, of the Mamba clan
- Nanfuka, daughter of Kasujja, of the Ngeye clan

== Issue ==
He fathered four sons:

- Prince (Omulangira) Kawaali, whose mother was Nabbanja
- Prince (Omulangira) Lulume, whose mother was Nabbanja
- Prince (Omulangira) Gogombe, whose mother was Nakkazi
- Prince (Omulangira) Zigulu, whose mother was Nanfuka

== The final years ==
He died at the Bagambamunyoro Palace, Bubango, Busiro County, in 1584. He was buried at Gombe, in Bulemeezi County and his jaw was buried at his capital. Other sources place his burial place at Bubango, Busiro.

== See also ==
- Kabaka of Buganda

Preceded by Mulondo	King of Buganda c.1564–c.1584	Succeeded by Suuna I
