= Suuna I of Buganda =

Ssekabaka Suuna I Kisolo

Kabaka of Buganda
- Reign: 1584 – 1614
- Predecessor: Jemba of Buganda
- Successor: Sekamaanya of Buganda
- Born: Buganda
- Died: 1614; Jimbo, Busiro
- Burial: Jimbo, Busiro
- Spouse: 1. Lady Nakigo; 2. Lady Naluggwa
- Father: Nakibinge of Buganda
- Mother: Namasole Nassuuna

Suuna I Kisolo, also spelt as Ssuuna I Kisolo, was the 11th Kabaka (King) of the Kingdom of Buganda, reigning from about 1584 until his death around 1614. His reign is remembered as kind and gentle.

== Claim to the throne ==
He was the son of Kabaka Nakibinge Kagali, between 1524 and 1554. His mother was Nassuuna, his father's fifth wife. He took the throne after the death of his elder half-brother, Kabaka Jemba, in 1584. He established his capital at Jimbo Hill.

== Married life ==
He married two wives:

- Nakigo, daughter of Walusimbi, of the Ffumbe clan
- Naluggwa, daughter of Lwoomwa, of the Ndiga clan

He also married two "reserve" wives.

== Issue ==
He had four sons:

- Prince (Omulangira) Sewatti, whose mother was Nakigo
- Prince (Omulangira) Gogombe
- Prince (Omulangira) Kawaali
- Kabaka Kimbugwe, Kabaka of Buganda, whose mother was Naluggwa.

== The final years ==
He died in his mid-age, at his capital at Jimbo, Busiro in 1614. He was buried in Gombe and his jaw was buried at Jimbo.

== See also ==
- Suna II of Buganda
- Kabaka of Buganda

Preceded by Jemba Busungwe	King of Buganda c. 1584 – c. 1614	Succeeded by Sekamaanya Kisolo
