= Sekamaanya of Buganda =

Ssekabaka Sekamaanya Kisolo

Kabaka of Buganda
- Reign: 1614 – 1634
- Predecessor: Suuna I of Buganda
- Successor: Kimbugwe of Buganda
- Born: Uganda
- Died: 1634; Kongojje, Busiro
- Burial: Kongojje, Busiro
- Spouse: Nabakyaala Nabuuso
- Father: Mulondo of Buganda
- Mother: Namasole Nakku

Sekamaanya Kisolo, also spelled as Ssekamaanya Kisolo, was the 12th Kabaka of the Kingdom of Buganda reigning between 1614 and 1634. He is remembered for his cruel reign.

== Claim to the throne ==
He was the youngest son of Kabaka Mulondo Sekajja, Kabaka of Buganda. His mother was Nakku of the Ffumbe clan, the only wife his father married. He ascended to the throne upon the death of his uncle, Suuna I, in 1614. He established his capital at Kongojje Hill.

== Final years ==
He is buried at Kongojje, Busiro.

== See also ==
- Kabaka of Buganda
- Buganda

Preceded by Suuna I Kisolo	King of Buganda c. 1614 – c. 1634	Succeeded by Kimbugwe Kamegere
