= Kayima of Buganda =

Ssekabaka Kayima Sendikaddiwa

Kabaka of Buganda
- Reign: 1494 – 1524
- Predecessor: Kiggala of Buganda
- Successor: Nakibinge of Buganda
- Born: Uganda
- Died: 1524; Sunga
- Burial: Nabulagala, Busiro
- Spouse: 1. Lady Nababinge; 2. Lady Naddogo
- Father: Prince Wampamba
- Mother: Namasole Nakayima

Kayima Sendikaddiwa was the 7th Kabaka (king) of the Kingdom of Buganda, between 1494 and 1524.

== Claim to the throne ==
He was the son of Prince (Omulangira) Wampamba, by his first wife, Nakayima. He ascended the throne upon the death of his grandfather, Kiggala Mukaabya in 1494. He established his capital at Nazigo Hill.

== Marital life ==
He had two wives:

- Nababinge, daughter of Wampona, of the Mamba clan
- Naddogo, daughter of Kasujja, of the Ngeye clan

== Issue ==
He fathered two sons:

- Kabaka Nakibinge Kagali, whose mother was Nababinge
- Prince (Omulangira) Kabasanda, whose mother was Naddogo

== The final years ==
He was killed in battle against Chief Bwakamba of Nyendo, at Sunga, in 1524. He is buried at Nabulagala, Busiro.

== See also ==
- Kabaka of Buganda

Preceded by Kiggala Mukaabya	King of Buganda c.1494–c.1524	Succeeded by Nakibinge Kagali
