= Kimbugwe of Buganda =

Ssekabaka Kimbugwe Kamegere

Kabaka of Buganda
- Reign: 1634 – 1644
- Predecessor: Sekamaanya of Buganda
- Successor: Kateregga of Buganda
- Born: Uganda
- Died: 1584; Bugwaanya, Busiro
- Burial: Bugwaanya, Busiro
- Spouse: 1. Lady Nakamyuuka; 2. Lady Nakunja; 3. Nabakyaala Nabuuso
- Father: Suuna I of Buganda
- Mother: Namasole Naluggwa

Kimbugwe Kamegere was the Kabaka in the Buganda Kingdom between 1634 and 1644. He was the 13th Kabaka. He is remembered as a good king.

== Claim to the throne ==
He was born at Kongojje, the youngest son of Suuna I Kisolo, between 1584 and 1614. His mother was Naluggwa of the Ndiga clan, the second wife of his father. He ascended to the throne after the death of his cousin, Kabaka Sekamaanya. He established his capital at Bugwaanya.

== Married life ==
He had three wives:

- Nakamyuuka, daughter of Mukusu, of the Mpindi clan
- Nakunja, daughter of Sekayiba, of the Mbogo clan
- Nabakyaala Nabuuso, the Naabagareka, daughter of Gunju, of the Butiko clan and widow of his predecessor, Kabaka Sekamaanya Kisolo, Kabaka of Buganda, who ruled between 1614 and 1634.

== Issue ==
He had two sons, both with his first wife Nakamyuuka:

- Prince (Omulangira) Kamyuuka
- Prince (Omulangira) Baleke

== The final years ==
He was killed, allegedly by witchcraft by his stepson, Prince Kateregga, who succeeded him to the throne, circa 1644. He is buried at Bugwaanya, Busiro.

Preceded by Sekamaanya Kisolo	King of Buganda c.1634–c.1644	Succeeded by Kateregga Kamegere
