= Fred Masagazi =

Ugandan Afrojazz musician (1937–2009)

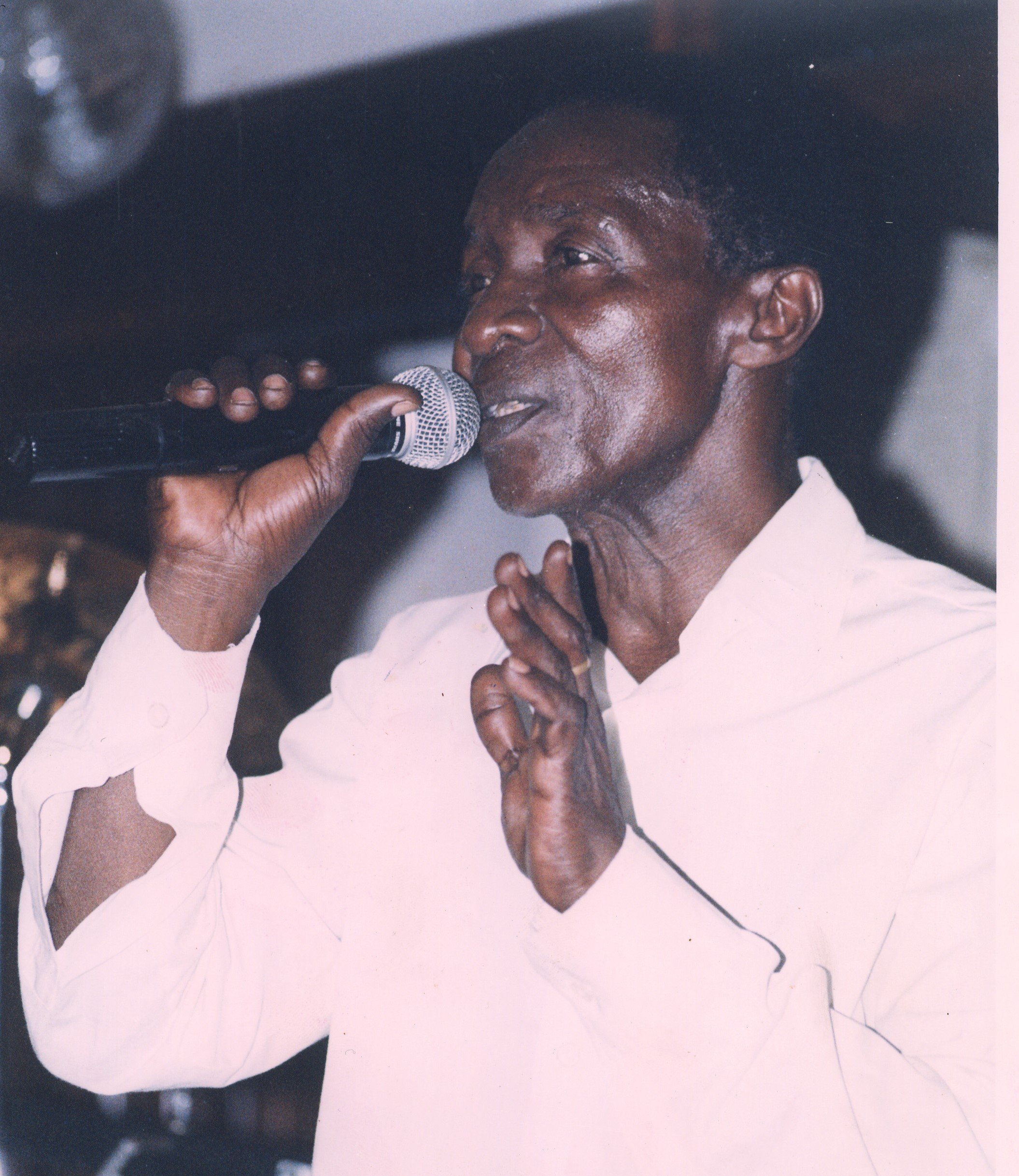
- Background Information
- Born: 1937; Kampala, Uganda
- Died: 2009 (aged 71–72)
- Occupation: Musician

Fred Masagazi (1937–2009) was a Ugandan Afrojazz musician. He was the first Ugandan artist to have his song played on the BBC, with his song "Kolazizo", in 1963.

== Music ==
Masagazi started his music career in 1955 as a singer in a Congolese band, "Tinapa", where he sang both Congolese and Luganda. His first song was "Atanawa Musolo", which he released a year before Uganda's independence in 1961. He later released "Osaana Okole" in 1962 and "Lucy Tuula" in 1963. Masagazi was an accomplished composer who sang for more than fifty years. He was among the few Kadongo Kamu musicians who could sing, play the guitar and dramatize his music on stage. He founded his own band, "UK Jazz Band" in 1963. His band disintegrated, forcing him to perform in various bands like "King Jazz Band", "Kampala City 6 Band" and "BKG Band". His song "Atanawa Musolo" was ranked by Daily Monitor as one of "The 50 timeless songs that bring back memories" in one of its pieces for Uganda's fiftieth independence anniversary.

== Discography ==
=== Songs ===
- Atannawa musolo
- Noonya Lukia
- Osaana Okole
- Lucy Tuula
- Alululu
- Ndiwuwo
- Kyali Kyetagesa

== See also ==
- Elly Wamala
- Jimmy Katumba
