= Alex Mukulu =

Ugandan playwright (1954–2026)

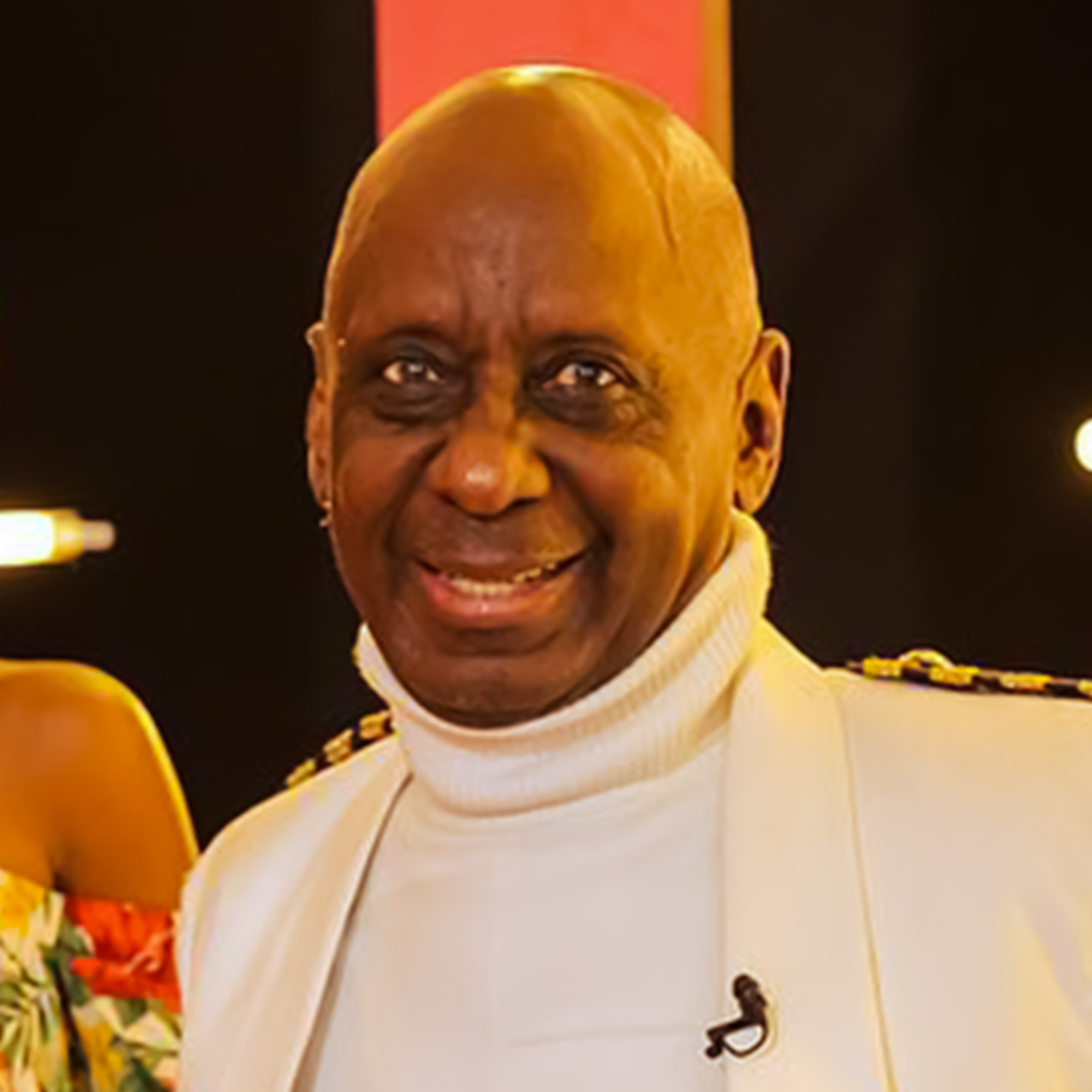
Mukulu at Yolesa Ekitone as a Judge

Alex Mukulu (1954 – August 2026) was a Ugandan playwright, actor, instrumentalist and author.

== Life and career ==
Mukulu was born in Misebe, Mityana (Ssingo County), Buganda in 1954, to Paulo Kayizi Lugaizi and Victoria Ndagire, daughter of Prince Yokana Kimbugwe of Lungujja. After Kololo Secondary School, he studied Film and Drama at Makerere University, Kampala, Uganda. His most well-known plays include “30 Years of Bananas”, “Wounds of Africa” and “Guest of Honour”. “Journey to Self-Realization” was performed at the opening ceremony of the Commonwealth Heads of Government Meeting held in Kampala in 2007.

On 15 August 2026, it was announced that Mukulu had died. He was 72.

== Works ==
=== Plays ===
1. “Muzukulu wa Kabangala” (produced 1977)
2. “Engule ya Kamukukulu” (produced 1978 )
3. “Springs of Tears” (produced 1979)
4. “The Cigarette” (produced 1980)
5. “Opera Bakisimba” (produced 1980)
6. “Twin Opera” (produced 1980)
7. “The Celebrity” (produced 1983)
8. “I killed the Archbishop” (produced 1984)
9. “Gwanga Mujje” (produced 1985)
10. “Mbasalidde ga Nkolwa” (produced 1985)
11. “Stop it with 11 men” (produced 1986)
12. “Liberator kid” (produced 1987)
13. “The Drunkards” (produced 1986/7)
14. “Wounds of Africa” (produced 1988)
15. “Peasants Cry” (produced 1989)
16. “30 years of Bananas” (produced 1991)
17. “Excuse me Mzungu” (produced 1992)
18. “The Guest of Honour” (produced 1994)
19. “Seven workers of Uganda” (produced 1995)
20. “Radio Mambo Bado” (produced 1996)
21. “A good Muganda case” (produced 2021)
22. “The People`s President (produced 2022)
23. “Journey to Self-Realization” (performed at the opening ceremony of the Commonwealth Heads of Governments Meeting, held in Kampala, 2007)

=== Books ===
30 Years of Bananas, Alex Mukulu, Oxford University Press, 1993

== Death ==
Mukulu died on 15 August 2026, at the age of 72 at Kiruddu General Referral Hospital.
