= Lubigi =

Wetland on the outskirts of Kampala, Uganda

Coordinates: 00°19′12″N 32°31′12″E

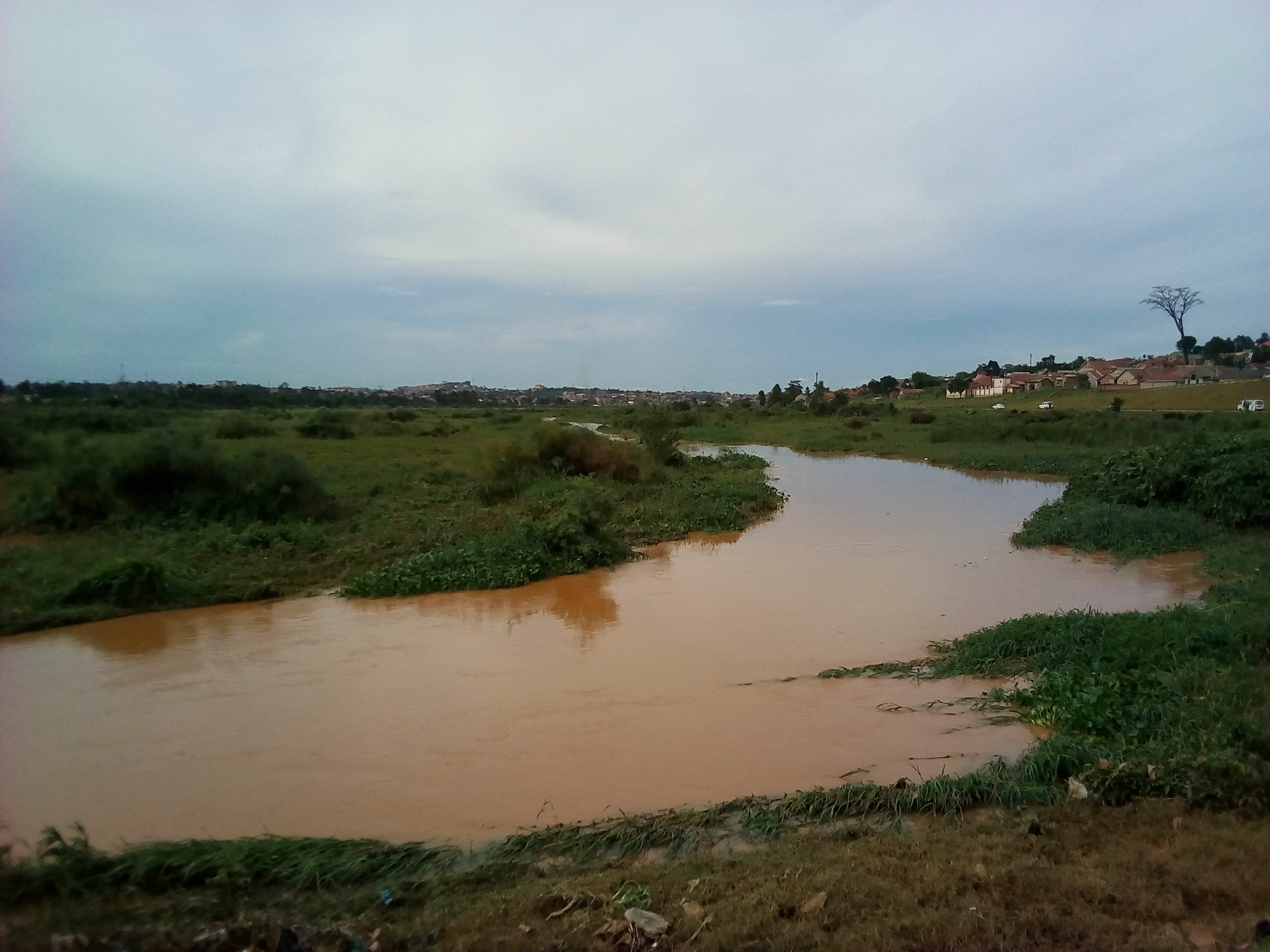
Lubigi Wetland in Uganda

Lubigi is a swampy wetland on the northern and western outskirts of Kampala, the capital and largest city of Uganda.

== Location ==
Lubigi forms an irregular semi-circle around the city of Kampala, starting at around Kisaasi to the north, stretching westwards, passing through Bwaise and Kawaala, then stretching southwards through Busega. The swamp has feeder arms that stretch along the Kampala–Mityana Road towards Buloba, along Kampala–Masaka Road towards Kyengera, along Kampala–Hoima Road towards Nansana and along Sentema Road that stretches from Mengo to Sentema. The Kampala Northern Bypass Highway is built in the wetland for more than half of its length. The Bwaise slum is entirely built within the Lubigi wetland. The geographical coordinates of Lubigi wetland are:0°19'12.0"N, 32°31'12.0"E (Latitude:0°19'12.0"N; Longitude:32°31'12.0"E).

== Overview ==
Lubigi wetland is a very important water catchment area, serving the city of Kampala and the surrounding areas of Wakiso District. Rain water from the northern and western suburbs of the city drains, via underground aquifers and surface run-off, into the swamp, where it supports unique wildlife, including over 200 species of birds, one of which is the crested crane, the national bird. The predominant flora is papyrus grass.

To the north, around Kisaasi and Ntinda, the wetland connects with the tributaries of Nakivubo Channel, another wetland that drains into Lake Victoria, southwest of Port Bell. To the south, around Busega, some of the water in the wetland drains southeast into Lake Victoria, while the rest flows northwest, along the Kampala–Mityana Road towards Buloba. West of Buloba, the flow turns northwards as a tributary of the River Mayanja, which forms part of Lake Kyoga drainage basin.

== Recent developments ==
In recent years, the wetland has come under severe strain from human encroachment. The government of Uganda has constructed three major projects in the wetland, contributing to its degradation:

- The Kampala Northern Bypass Highway, opened in 2009, was constructed through the wetland.
- The high tension electric cables carrying power from the Kawanda substation to the Mutundwe substation pass through Lubigi. This 132 kilovolt power line was commissioned in 2012.
- The National Water and Sewerage Corporation has constructed a sewage treatment plant in the middle of the wetland.

== Restoration ==
In March 2016, staff from Uganda's National Environment Management Authority began to forcibly remove gardens planted by encroachers with maize, cassava yam, banana, and sugarcane.

During the month of June 2024, many people have been rendered homeless and jobless due to demolition of homes, shops by the Uganda National Environmental Management Authority (NEMA) in Lubigi wetlands. Hence the right to livelihood and shelter of the affected residents has been infringed on. Due to these forceful evictions, some of the legislators have come out to question NEMA about this kind of act.

== See also ==
- Kampala Capital City Authority
