= Mulondo of Buganda =

Ssekabaka Mulondo Sekajja

Kabaka of Buganda
- Reign: 1555 – 1564
- Predecessor: Nakibinge of Buganda
- Successor: Jemba of Buganda
- Born: Uganda
- Died: 1564; Mitw'ebiri
- Burial: Gombe
- Spouse: Lady Nakku
- Father: Nakibinge of Buganda
- Mother: Namasole Namulondo

Mulondo Sekajja was the 9th Kabaka (king) of the Kingdom of Buganda reigning from 1555 to 1564.

== Claim to the throne ==
He was the eldest surviving son of Kabaka Nakibinge Kagali, Kabaka of Buganda, who reigned between 1524 and 1554. His mother was Nabakyaala Namulondo, the fourth wife of his father and the Naabagereka. He was elected to succeed his father, upon his father's death and after the regency of his step-mother expired on the birth of her daughter in 1555. He established his capital at Mitw'ebiri Hill.

Historian Semakula Kiwanuka asserts that the reign of Mulondo might be an indication of the beginning of a new dynasty.

"But the circumstances which led to Nakibinge's death and those which surrounded the accession of Mulondo render some of our sources suspicious. For instance, the claim that Mulondo came to the throne as an infant seems to be contradicted by a close analysis of the sources. This analysis strongly suggests that Mulondo and his immediate successors came from Sese."

During his reign, Mulondo led several raids against Buddu, which was then still part of the Bunyoro-Kitara kingdom.

== Married life ==
He married as his only wife, Nakku, daughter of Naserenga, of the Ffumbe clan.

== Issue ==
He fathered three sons, by his wife, Nakku of the Ffumbe clan:

- Prince (Omulangira) Kazibwe
- Prince (Omulangira) Walugembe
- Kabaka Sekamaanya Kisolo, Kabaka of Buganda

== The final years ==
He died at the Kiryokyembi Palace, in Mitw'ebiri. He was buried at Gombe, in Bulemeezi County and his jaw was buried at his capital. Other sources place his burial place at Bulondo Busiro.

== See also ==
- Kabaka of Buganda

Preceded by Nakibinge Kagali	King of Buganda c.1555–c.1565	Succeeded by Jemba Busungwe
