= Winyi of Kibulala =

Wasswa Chwamale Mwanga Winyi
- Omukama of Bunyoro
- Reign: Early 14th century
- Predecessor: Unknown
- Successor: Unknown
- Born: Kibulala, Ssingo, Uganda
- Died: Mid 14th century Kibulala, Ssingo
- Burial: Kibulala, Ssingo
- Spouse: Lady Wannyana
- Father: Kintu of Buganda
- Mother: Unknown

Wasswa Chwamale Mwanga Winyi (fl. early 14th century) was a reigning monarch of Bunyoro-Kitara during the period circa 1300 AD. His chief palace was located at Kibulala, Ssingo, where his remains are buried today. When Prince Kalemeera of Buganda, the only son of Ssekabaka Chwa Nabakka, was exiled to Bunyoro, he took refuge at the palace of his paternal uncle, Winyi I at his palace in Kibulala. There he committed more transgressions, fathering Prince Kimera Walusimbi with Lady Wannyana, his uncle's chief wife. Prince Kimera later became the third Kabaka of Buganda.

== Lineage ==
He was the second-born of Ssekabaka Kato Kintu's five children. He was born at Kibulala.

== Marital life and children ==
Prince (Omulangira) Winyi, Chief of Kibulala (allegedly Winyi I, Omukama of Bunyoro-Kitara) married Lady Wannyana, his chief wife, sister of Balitema Kajubi, Chief of Busujju, a Muhima. Together they had two children: (a) Princess (Omumbejja) Musenyu, Chiefess of Kyeeya; the eldest child and (b) Prince (Omulangira) Ntembe, Chief of Busoga.

== Ababiito of Kibulala ==
The descendants of Winyi of Kibulala, constitute the Buganda Clan known as Ababiito b'eKibulala (the Babiito of Kibulala), one of the 54 recognized clans of the estimated 9 million Baganda.

== The final days ==
Wasswa Chwamale Mwanga Winyi died sometime in the middle of the 14th Century. He is buried at Kibulala, Ssingo, in modern-day Kiboga District. His burial site is recognized by the Buganda Royal Family as a Buganda Cultural Site. Naalinnya Dina Kigga Mukarukidi, the sister of the reigning Buganda Monarch, Muwenda Mutebi II, is assigned to the site, as cultural supervisor.

== Succession table ==
| Preceded by Unknown | King of Bunyoro; Early Fourteenth Century | Succeeded by Unknown |

== See also ==
- Kabaka of Buganda
- Omukama of Bunyoro
