= Bukomero =

Ugandan town

- Town
- Location in Uganda; Placement on map is approximate
- Coordinates: 00°41′22″N 32°02′20″E
- Country: Uganda
- Region: Central Region
- District: Kiboga District
- Municipality: Bukomero Municipality
- County: Ssingo
- Sub-county: Bukomero sub-county
- Elevation: 3,980 ft (1,213 m)

Bukomero is a town in Ssingo County, Kiboga District, in the Central Region of Uganda.

== Location ==
The town is located on the Kampala–Hoima Road, approximately 44 kilometres (27 mi), southeast of Kiboga, where the district headquarters are located. This is approximately 80 kilometres (50 mi), northwest of Kampala, the capital and largest city of Uganda. The coordinates of Bukomero are 0°41'22.0"N, 32°02'20.0"E (Latitude:0.689444; Longitude:32.038889). Bukomero sits at an average elevation of 1,213 metres (3,980 ft) above mean sea level.

== Overview ==
Bukomero is on a relative plateau surrounded by hilly, rocky, infertile, and often bare terrain. Most economic activity takes place in the lower, more accessible, fertile plains. Commercial and administrative activities in the town's central business district, include small scale family shops ("dduukas"), a farmer's market, and a sub-county headquarters. Public service facilities include one public health center, one public elementary school, and one public secondary school. The area is prone to water shortages.

== Population ==
In 2015, the Uganda Bureau of Statistics (UBOS) estimated the population of Bukomero Town Council at 14,500. In 2020, UBOS estimated the town's mid-year population at 16,400. The table below, illustrates the same data in tabular format.

Historical population
Year	Pop.	±%
2015	14,500	—
2020	16,400	+13.1%

== Other considerations ==
Bukomero is also the headquarters of Bukomero sub-county, one of the nine administrative subdivisions of Kiboga District, comprising seven sub-counties and two town councils. A gravel road from Bukomero leads northwest to the town of Kyankwanzi, approximately 72 kilometres (45 mi) from Bukomero.

== See also ==
- Kiboga
- Kibulala, Ssingo
- Kiboga District
