= Nakibinge of Buganda =

Ssekabaka Nakibinge Kagali

Kabaka of Buganda
- Reign: 1524 – 1554
- Predecessor: Kayima of Buganda
- Successor: Mulondo of Buganda
- Born: Uganda
- Died: 1554; Busajja
- Burial: Kongojje, Busiro
- Spouse: 1. Lady Nabitaba; 2. Lady Najjemba; 3. Lady Nalunga; 4. Naabakyaala Namulondo, the Nnabagereka; 5. Lady Nasuuna; 6. Lady Bukirwa; 7. Lady Nannono; 8. Lady Kabejja
- Father: Kayima of Buganda

Nakibinge Kagali was the 8th Kabaka (King) of the Kingdom of Buganda, between 1524 and 1554 AD.

== Claim to the throne ==
He was the son of Kabaka Kayima Sendikaddiwa, the seventh Kabaka of Buganda, who reigned from 1494 until 1524. Kabaka Nakibinge ascended the throne upon the death of his father in 1524. He established his capital at Bumbu Hill.

During his reign, Nakibinge launched attacks on Bulemezi, which roused the attention of the Omukama of Bunyoro. In the ensuing years, the war raged on, and the heavy attacks of the Banyoro forced Nakibinge to seek military aid from the Islands of Ssesse. However, this boost in military force only guaranteed victory for a brief moment for Nakibinge.

Despite penetrating further into Bunyoro territory, the Banyoro regrouped and drove Nakibinge's army from Bunyoro. The Banyoro chased his troops through Bulemezi, Kyaddondo and Mawokota.

== Married life ==
He married eight wives:

- Nabitaba, daughter of Ndugwa, of the Lugave clan
- Najjemba, daughter of Semwanga, of the Ngonge clan
- Nalunga, daughter of Lusundo, of the Nvuma clan
- Nabakyaala Namulondo, the Naabagareka, sister of Gunju, of the Butiko clan
- Nasuuna, daughter of Nankere, of the Mamba clan
- Bukirwa, the Nanzigu, daughter of Sekayiba, of the Mbogo clan
- Nannono, daughter of Seggirinya, of the Ngo clan. Nannono acted as regent after the death of her husband for a period of eighteen months
- Kabejja

== Issue ==
He fathered four sons and two daughters:

1. Kabaka Mulondo Sekajja, Kabaka of Buganda, whose mother was Namulondo
2. Kabaka Jemba Busungwe, Kabaka of Buganda, whose mother was Najjemba
3. Kabaka Suuna I Kisolo, Kabaka of Buganda, whose mother was Nassuuna
4. Prince (Omulangira) Nzigu, whose mother was Bukirwa
5. Princess (Omumbejja) Batenga, whose mother was Namulondo
6. Princess (Omumbejja) Nnono, whose mother was Nannono. Born posthumously in 1555. She died young.

== The final years ==
Kabaka Nakibinge was killed in battle against the Banyoro, at Busajja, in 1554. He is buried at Kongojje, Busiro.

According to Buganda historian Semakula Kiwanuka, Nakibinge's death signals the end of the "Babito" dynasty in Buganda, and heralded a new era.

"The immediate and perhaps most important result of Nakibinge's death was that it seems to have ended the previous dynasty and thereby created a succession crisis for Buganda. The sources for this period, however, have perhaps as many variants as those of other regions put together. The reason for this is probably that a new dynasty was introduced and also that Nakibinge himself was regarded by the Baganda as a national hero. Hence the multiplicity of traditions which tend to contradict each other."

== See also ==
- Kabaka of Buganda

Preceded by Kayima Sendikaddiwa	King of Buganda c.1524–c.1554	Succeeded by Mulondo Sekajja
