= Ddumba =

Ddumba is a surname. Notable people with the surname include:

- John Ddumba Ssentamu (born 1953), Ugandan economist, academic, and banker
- Sabina Ddumba (born 1994), Swedish singer of Ugandan ancestry
