= Kimera of Buganda =

Ssekabaka Kimera

Kabaka of Buganda
- Reign: 1374 – 1404
- Predecessor: Chwa I of Buganda
- Successor: Ttembo of Buganda
- Born: circa 1360; Bunyoro Kingdom Royal Court, Uganda
- Died: 1404
- Burial: Bumera, Busiro
- Spouse: 1. Lady Nabukalu; 2. Lady Nakku; 3. Lady Namagembe
- Father: Prince Kalemera of Buganda
- Mother: Namasole Wannyana

Kimera was Kabaka of the Kingdom of Buganda between 1374 and 1404. He was the third king of Buganda.

According to oral traditions, he migrated from Bunyoro and played a key role in consolidating centralized kingship in Buganda. His life and reign are primarily documented through oral history, and exact dates and details remain uncertain.

== Claim to the throne ==
According to Buganda oral traditions, Kimera was a son of Prince Kalemera, a member of the royal house of Buganda who live in Bunyoro, the son of Kabaka Chwa I Nabakka. It has been pointed out by different books and writers showing Kimera as the Only son of Prince Kalemera. This is not true. Kimera was a twin and his twin brother was Kato Kibi Kaganda, who became a King himself. He conquered his own Kingdom in Kiziba, current day Tanzania. They could not rule Buganda together, thus he went to Sesse, came back to Buganda and went south. Their mother was Lady Wannyana, the supposed chief wife of King Winyi I of Bunyoro.

== Influence on Buganda Culture ==
Kimera made the journey to Buganda accompanied by his mother and the family of Katumba (Nkima clan), his adoptive father. On reaching Buganda, Katumba was appointed Mugema, hereditary head of the Nkima (monkey) clan. The Mugema plays a significant role in Buganda culture, notably performing the investiture of the new Kabaka until the reign of Mutebi I.

From Bunyoro, he brought with him the royal drum Kibonabona, which is beaten by the new Kabaka during coronation. During this ceremony, the Kabaka is presented with a bracelet of beads, and there's a proclamation "You are Kimera."

Kimera's mother chose not to live with her son in the capital, and a residence was built for her called Lusaka, which became the official title of the Queen Mother's residence.

Some of the great officers of state during his reign included;

Name	Clan	Position	Translation
Walusimbi	Ffumbe (Civet Cat)	Katikiro	Chief Minister
Bakitenda	Ffumbe (Civet Cat)	Katikiro	Chief Minister
Ssebatta	Ngeye (Colobus Monkey)	Kaggo	Governor of Kyaddondo
Katumba	Nkima (Vervet Monkey)	Mugema	Governor of Busiro
Balitema Kajubi	Nsenene (Grasshopper)	Kasujju	Governor of Busujju
Nnabugwamu-Kakebe	Mmamba (Lung fish)	Kangaawo	Governor of Bulemezi
Gaajuule	Mbogo (Buffalo)	Mukwenda	Governor of Ssingo

== The final years ==
Kabaka Kimera was killed in a hunting accident around 1404. He was clubbed on the head by his grandson Kabaka Ttembo Kiridde, who succeeded him. Some accounts narrate the event as a deliberate act, but the most convincing accounts say it was an accident. He was initially buried at the site of his death. In 1869, his remains were exhumed and re-buried at Lunnyo, near the city of Entebbe, close to where the present Uganda State House is located. Other credible accounts give his burial place as Bumera Busiro.

== Quotes ==
"Kimera, the third Kabaka, was the true founder of our dynasty."

- Sir Edward Muteesa II, Desecration of My Kingdom, 1967

"The real significance of the Kimera migration is that it introduced a new dynasty."

- MM Semakula Kiwanuka, A History of Buganda, 1971

== See also ==
- Kabaka of Buganda

Preceded by Chwa I	King of Buganda c.1374–c.1404	Succeeded by Ttembo
