= Sentema =

- Location in Uganda
- Coordinates: 00°22′14″N 32°24′56″E
- Country: Uganda
- Region: Central Region, Uganda
- District: Wakiso District
- County: Busiro

Sentema is a town in Wakiso District, central Uganda. The town is a municipality under Wakiso District Administration. The other municipalities in the district include:

- Entebbe Municipality
- Kira Municipality
- Nansana Municipality
- Makindye Ssabagabo Municipality

== Location ==
Sentema is located in Wakiso District, approximately 27 kilometres (17 mi), by road, northwest of Kampala, Uganda's capital and largest city. The coordinates of Sentema are:0°22'14.0"N, 32°24'56.0"E (Latitude:0.370556; Longitude:32.415556).

== Population ==
The exact population of Sentema is not known as of February 2015.

== Points of interest ==
The following points of interest are located in Sentema:

- The offices of Sentema Town Council
- Sentema Prison - Under the administration of the Uganda Prisons Services

== See also ==
- Wakiso District
- Central Region, Uganda
