= Elly Wamala =

Ugandan musician

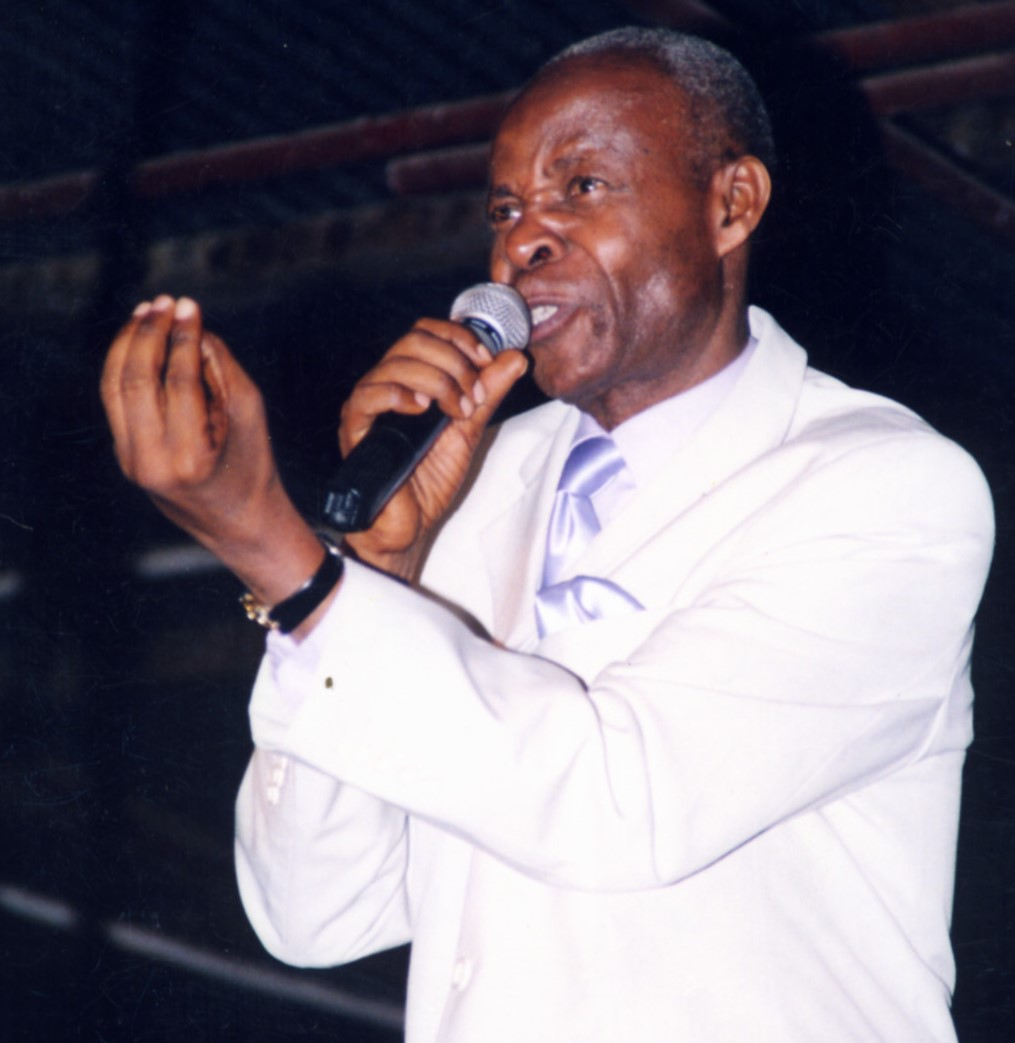
- Born: Elishama Lukwata Wamala; 13 December 1935; Uganda
- Died: 22 August 2004 (aged 68)
- Occupation: Musician
- Known for: The father of Uganda's Music Recording industry
- Notable work: Nabutono (1959)
- Style: World Music
- Partner: Rebecca Wamala (from 10 January 1970)
- Children: 12

Elly Wamala (13 December 1935 – 22 August 2004) was a Ugandan musician. On 22 August 2004, he succumbed to throat cancer at Mulago Hospital. Wamala was one of Uganda's first musicians to release a recorded song and have it become a commercial hit in the 1950s when he released Nabutono. The song was so successful that it caught the attention of a nation and Kabaka Edward Mutesa II who regularly summoned Wamala to his court to perform the song. After Nabutono, Wamala's next release was Josephine and it also became a hit. By the time of his death, he had over 60 songs to his name, including Nabutono produced in 1959, Viola (1974), Welcome Pope Paul VI (1969), Akaana Ka Kawalya (1974), and Ebinyumu Ebyaffe (1998), among others.

== Early childhood and education ==
Elly Wamala was born "Elishama Lukwata Wamala" on 13 December 1935 to sub-county clerk Ignatius Mutambuze and Gladys Nabutiti in Bulucheke, Mbale. He was the third of 19 children. He was raised in Bulenga on Mityana road by his paternal uncle, Daniel Katunda. His musical talent was spotted when he was five years old, and his uncle started to call on him to entertain his frequent visitors.

He studied at Bbira Primary School and later Mackay Primary School, where the headmaster, Livingstone Semyano, noticed his musical talent and started teaching him how to sing and read music. After primary school, Wamala joined Mengo Secondary School, before going to Makerere College where he studied linguistics, poetry, and prose.

After Makerere, he played the guitar at New Life Bar in Mengo before going to Kenya to study advanced guitar playing at the Nairobi Conservatoire. In Kenya, he led the Sportsman Chachacha Band which was sponsored by the Cigarette makers Sportsman, before going to England. Wamala returned from Britain with a Banjo Mandolin Guitar diploma. He also studied TV production in Wales and on return to Uganda in 1961 worked with the national broadcaster, until 1981 when he retired. Wamala was diagnosed with colon cancer in 2000, and subsequently underwent surgery and 52 weeks of chemotherapy. After the treatment, he released what was to be his last album, Ani Yali Amanyi. By then, the cancer had spread, and he died in 2004. He is survived by a wife and 12 children and a number of grandchildren.

== Music ==
Wamala dropped out of school in junior secondary three and started to work at a Kampala music store. He quit and started to work with the then Public Works Department (PWD), and later as a receptionist and resident artiste with Opel Tom Tom, a recording studio in Kampala's industrial area. When Opel Tom Tom closed, Wamala moved to Nairobi, where he became a resident guitarist at a commercial recording studio, HiFi. He was picked to lead the Sportsman Cha Cha band, which was sponsored to tour East Africa, promoting Sportsman cigarettes. In the 1950s, he penned his first song, the playful love song, Nabutono. This song became the first kadongo kamu song to be recorded on vinyl.

== Television ==
In 1963, Wamala joined Uganda Television (UTV) at its inception. He worked as a producer, senior producer, and later as controller of programmes. He also hosted a musical show (Saturday Night with Elly Wamala). In 1966, he studied television production at the Thompson foundation in Glasgow, Scotland. He used that opportunity to be examined by guitarist George Cissily, and obtained a BMG Diploma in plectrum guitar playing, majoring in finger-board harmony. While at UTV, he took a year off [1968–69] to do a diploma in drama at Makerere University. With this skill, he got to appreciate language, prose, and poetry, an attribute that is seen in his compositions.

Between 1980 and 1981, Wamala taught television production at the Institute of Public Administration (now Uganda Management Institute). He founded the Mascots band and molded it to become one of the most successful bands in Kampala in the 1980s. Its membership included Kampala lawyer Andrew Kasirye, and singers Tonny Ssenkebejje, Peterson Tusuubira Mutebi, Frank Mbalire and Kabuye Ssembogga.

== Death ==
On 22 August 2004, Wamala succumbed to throat cancer from Mulago National Referral Hospital and was buried in Kyengera Town Council.
