= Kato Kintu =

First Kabaka of Buganda

Ssekabaka Kato Kintu

Kabaka of Buganda
- Reign: late 13th century
- Predecessor: None
- Successor: Chwa I of Buganda
- Born: Uganda
- Died: Mid-14th century Nnono, Busujju
- Burial: Nnono, Busujju
- Spouse: Nambi Nantuttululu
- Father: Kagona
- Mother: Namukana

Kato Kintu Kakulukuku (fl. Late 13th century), known in Bunyoro as Kato Kimera, was the first kabaka (king) of the Kingdom of Buganda. "Kintu" is an adopted by-name, chosen for Kintu, the name of the first person on earth in Buganda mythology. Kato Kintu gave himself the name "Kintu" to associate himself with the "father of all people", and he may have renamed his wife, from Nantuttululu to Nambi, because that was Kintu's wife's name.

== Background and reign ==
Kintu was born at Bukasa Village, in the Ssese Islands, on Lake Nalubaale. He established his capital at Nnono, Busujju County. He fathered three children: Gguluddene, Ccwa (also spelt as Chwa) and Wakayima.

- Prince (Omulangira) Mulanga

== Death ==
According to Buganda's oral traditions, Kabaka Kato Kintu died at age thirty. Traditions differ regarding the circumstances of his death, and no contemporary written record describe the event. Some traditions place his burial at Nnono, Busujju County.

He was succeed by his son, Chwa I.

== See also ==
- Kabaka of Buganda
- Winyi of Kibulala

Preceded by Rukidi 1 of Bunyoro/Bemba	King of Buganda early fourteenth century	Succeeded by Chwa I
