= Buganda =

Bantu kingdom within Uganda

Kingdom of Buganda Obwakabaka bwa Buganda (Ganda)
- Flag Coat of arms
- Anthem: Ekitiibwa kya Buganda (English: "The Pride of Buganda")
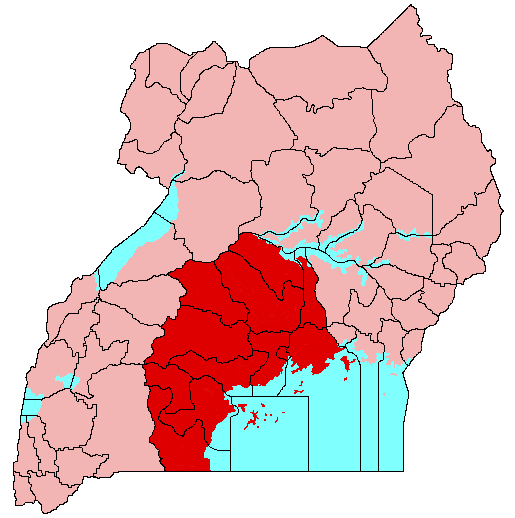
- Location of Buganda (red) in Uganda (pink)
- Status: Traditional kingdom
- Capital: Mengo
- Official languages: Luganda, English
- Ethnic groups: Baganda
- Demonyms: Muganda (singular); Baganda (plural)
- Government: Constitutional monarchy
  - Monarch: Muwenda Mutebi II
  - Prime Minister: Charles Peter Mayiga
- Legislature: Lukiiko

Establishment
  - Founded by Kato Kintu: 12th/13th/14th century
  - Protectorate of Uganda established: 1894
  - Uganda gains independence from the United Kingdom: 9 October 1962
  - Monarchy overthrown by Obote: 17 September 1967
  - Monarchy restored: 31 July 1993

Area
  - Total: 61,403.2 km^{2} (23,707.9 sq mi)

Population
  - 2021 estimate: 11,952,600
  - 2002 census: 6,575,425
  - Density: 107.086/km^{2} (277.4/sq mi)
- Currency: Ugandan shilling
- Time zone: UTC+3
- Calling code: 256

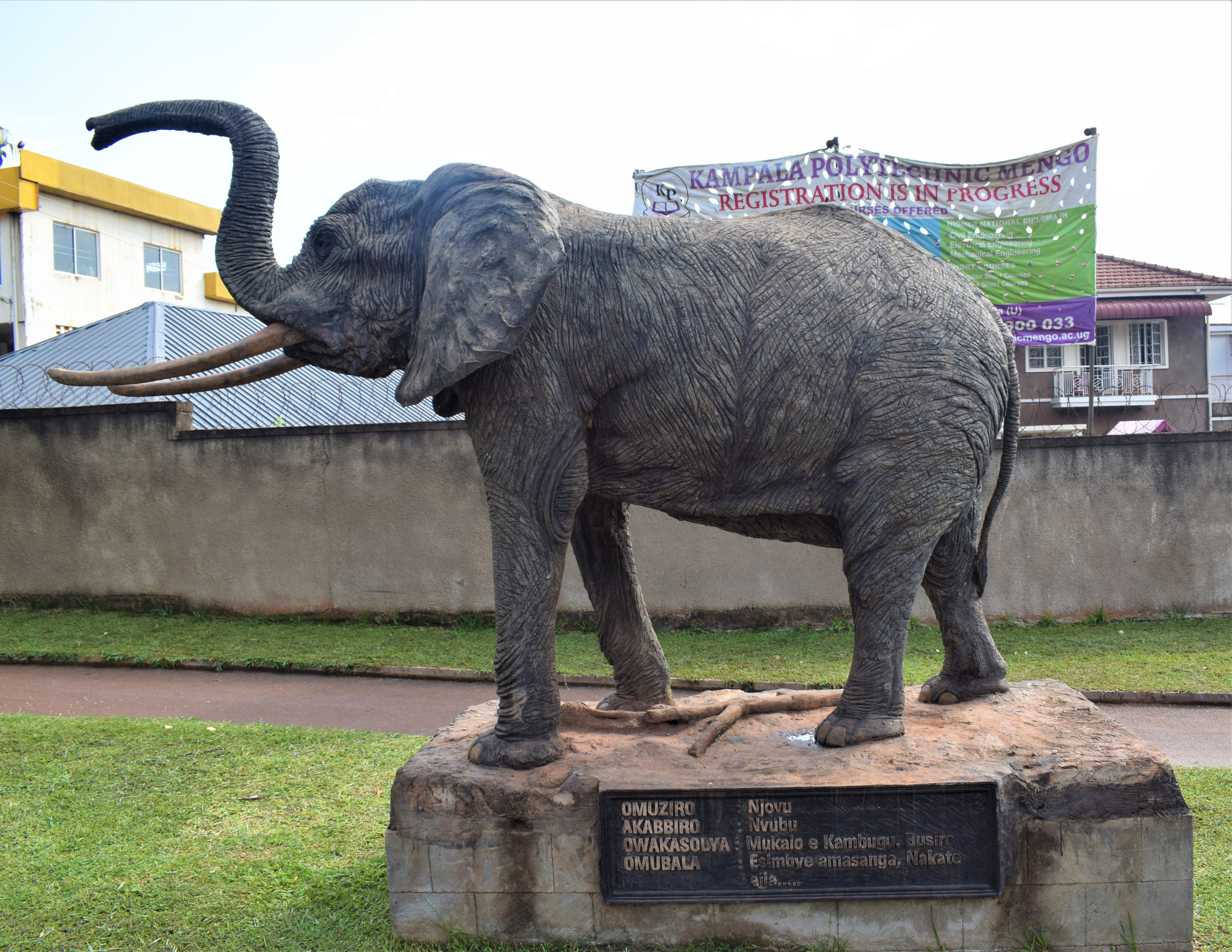
Photo of Njovu Clan totem

Buganda is a Bantu kingdom within Uganda. The kingdom of the Baganda people, Buganda is the largest of the traditional kingdoms in present-day East Africa, consisting of Uganda's Central Region, including the Ugandan capital Kampala. The 14 million Baganda (singular Muganda; often referred to simply by the root word and adjective, Ganda) make up the largest Ugandan region, representing approximately 16% of Uganda's population.

Buganda's history includes unification around the 13th century by the first king, Kato Kintu, the founder of Buganda's Kintu dynasty, and Buganda grew to become one of the largest and most powerful states in East Africa during the 18th and the 19th centuries. During the Scramble for Africa, and following unsuccessful attempts to retain its independence against British imperialism, Buganda became the centre of the Protectorate of Uganda in 1884; the name "Uganda", the Swahili term for Buganda, was adopted by British officials. Under British rule, many Baganda acquired status as colonial administrators, and Buganda became a major producer of cotton and coffee, and it continues to be Uganda's greatest coffee producer. In the financial year 2023/2024, the region produced over 3,170,000 bags of Robusta. Baganda through the Prime Minister and Katikkiro Charles Peter Mayiga's campaign of Emwaanyi Terimba actively participated in coffee production which in the end has brought about a significant extension in the country's coffee exports.

In 1967, Uganda's first Prime Minister Milton Obote declared Uganda a republic, abolished all monarchs, parliament became the constituent assembly and later all political parties were outlawed except the Uganda People's Congress.

Following years of political turmoil, the kingdom, which largely occupies a ceremonial role, was officially restored in 1993 by Uganda's ruling National Resistance Movement under Yoweri Museveni, the President of Uganda since 1986.

Since the restoration of the kingdom in 1993, the King of Buganda, known as the Kabaka, has been Muwenda Mutebi II. He is recognized as the 36th Kabaka of Buganda. The current queen, known as the Nnabagereka or Kaddulubale is Queen Sylvia Nagginda.

== Geography and environment ==
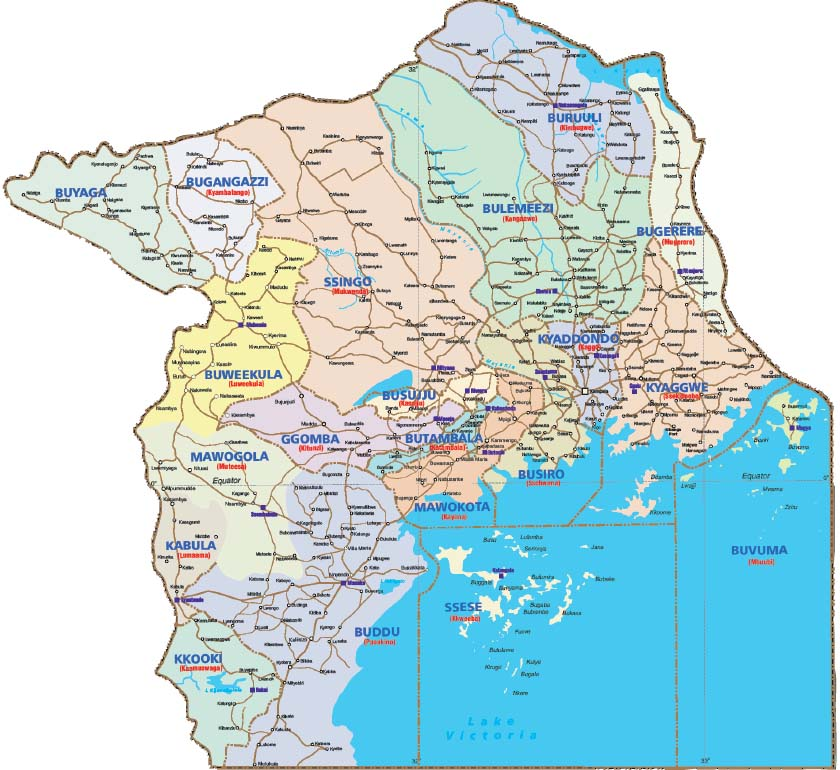
Buganda map.

It was a rich country, the most favoured part of the Lakeland, which is the most favoured part of Africa. Thanks to the great inland sea that the Ganda call Nalubaale, 'Mother of the gods', it enjoys a very reliable supply of rain. Being on the Equator it is warm all the year round, but as it is around 4,000 feet above sea-level it is never oppressively hot. And if climate has been kind, geology has been even kinder. Buganda is a land of small green hills, each rising some 200-400 feet above the valley floor. Many are flat-topped; for the land was once a plateau that has mostly crumbled away. As a result, the long slopes are covered with soils that are young and well supplied with plant nutrients. Deep, well structured, not easily eroded, they support a lush vegetation of which the characteristic feature is tenfoot-tall Elephant grass.

Ganda villages, sometimes as large as forty to fifty homes, were generally located on hillsides, leaving hilltops and swampy lowlands uninhabited, to be used for crops or pastures. Early Ganda villages surrounded the home of a chief or headman, which provided a common meeting ground for members of the village. The chief collected tribute from his subjects, provided tribute to the Kabaka, who was the ruler of the kingdom, distributed resources among his subjects, maintained order, and reinforced social solidarity through his decision-making skills. During the late 19th century, Ganda villages became more dispersed as the role of the chiefs diminished in response to political turmoil, population migration, and occasional popular revolts.

Buganda's boundaries are marked by the Tanzanian border in Lake Victoria (Lake Nalubaale) to the south, the River Nile (River Kiira) to the east, Lake Kyoga to the north, Ankole to the west and River Kafu to the northwest.

=== Sphere of Influence ===
Buganda was by far the most powerful kingdom/empire in the Great Lakes region of Africa with the most advanced and sophisticated state institutions. Most neighboring kingdoms paid tribute to the Ganda kings; even the powerful Bunyoro-Kitara kingdom sent their tribute with Kabaka Mutesa boasting of Mukama Kumurasi of Bunyoro paying tribute to him. Unlike Bunyoro, which validated tribute from other states via claims from myth and traditional history, Buganda subjugated its neighbors by using violence or the threat of violence to terrorize their neighbors into sending tribute.

Beyond Buganda's borders, there was a wide domain of influence and depredation. Kabakas launched regular raids and interfered in succession disputes to secure pliant puppet rulers. There were sizeable kingdoms to Bugandas east, but they were still not comparable to Buganda. To the west were drier grasslands where large herds of long-horned Ankole cattle were poorly defended by the Kingdom of Ankole. The Ankole kingdom would send large herds of cattle, in order to keep the peace with the kings of Buganda. The western and southern kingdoms were minuscule and raided unmercifully by Buganda's army. Rumanika, the king of Karagwe, told John Hanning Speke that the Baganda "have been making constant raids, seizing cattle and slaves from the surrounding countries". The Haya kingdoms on the coasts of the Kagera Region could not offer any resistance to Buganda's attacks by land and sea. Within the interior of the Kagera Region, The larger Kingdom of Karagwe acknowledged Buganda's superior power and accepted its suzerainty.

The once great kingdom of Bunyoro lay to Bugandas northwest frontier and was always on the defensive, being constantly raided by Buganda's armies. The Banyoro angrily referred to Buganda as "Mhwahwa" (land of wild dogs) due to this. Buganda assisted a rebel prince in breaking away from Bunyoro and forming the Tooro Kingdom. This was of great benefit for Buganda and gave it more secure access to strategic trade routes while weakening its rival.

Busoga supplied Buganda with slaves as a form of tribute, to palliate and strike bon accord with the Baganda.

The Basoga never entered Uganda [Buganda] without bringing large numbers of goats and cows as presents, and they often brought slaves too. The King [Kabaka] frequently demanded cattle and women of them, and thus obtained much wealth. Whenever a principal chief in Busoga died, there was much quarreling as to who should be his successor; and these disputes brought wealth to Uganda, whither each aspirant came to have his claims investigated.

Even areas as distant as the Kenyan border were not safe from Ganda invasions and plunder.

== History ==
=== Origin ===
The region of Buganda was inhabited by Bantu peoples from the 6th century CE, who made Urewe pottery. Baganda oral traditions hold the founder of the kingdom to have been Kato Kintu, who accordingly migrated from the north-eastern direction of Mount Elgon, leading various clans. In the region of Buganda he found various indigenous clans (banansangwawo), said to have had thirty kings prior to Kintu's arrival. Kintu defeated their last king, Bemba Musota. Likely founded between the 12th and 14th centuries, Buganda was initially a small kingdom covering the counties of Kyadondo, Busiro, and Mawokota. Further clans migrated in from the east. According to tradition, Kintu disappeared after having founded the kingdom. Prominent scholars such as Apollo Kaggwa and Lloyd Fallers consider Buganda's dynasty to have been local in origin, developing from primus inter pares patrilineal groups, which corroborates with the power clan heads had in Buganda's early history.

Elizabeth Isichei said that it is likely that the Buganda state is much more ancient than had previously been thought, and that Buganda began as a small kingdom in the north of Lake Victoria in what is now Busiro County. Christopher Wrigley wrote "A political structure of some sort, small in scale and mainly ritual in function, may be taken to have existed in northern Busiro, where the ancient shrines are clustered, at a time far beyond the reach of historical tradition...the rituals of Ganda kingship are both too elaborate and too archaic in character to have been evolved within the past few centuries."

==== Buganda and Kitara ====
Banyoro oral history (from Buganda's historical rival, Bunyoro-Kitara) says that Kimera, Buganda's third king, came from Bunyoro following the collapse of the Chwezi dynasty of Kitara, leading some clans to found a new Babiito dynasty in Buganda. This is fiercely contested by the Baganda, whose king list documents an unbroken line of 36 kings descending from Kintu, and some have called it "patriotic fiction".

Baganda oral history says that Buganda was distinct and of at least equal antiquity to Kitara. It has no mention of the Chwezi, and according to the historian Christopher Wrigley, "It is unlikely that Buganda was integrated into the system that was probably not called Kitara. Its language is distinct from 'Rutara', and the directors of the Ntusi and Bigo systems would not have had much interest in a land that was not really suited to cattle-rearing".

=== Expansion ===
In the 16th century, Bunyoro invaded Buganda, killing Kabaka Nakinge, however Buganda managed to maintain its independence. After this, it began to expand, as Bunyoro-Kitara entered into decline. Much of this expansion was at the expense of Bunyoro-Kitara, and occurred during the reigns of Kimbugwe, Katerega, and Mutebi during the 17th and 18th centuries. Among those conquered was Buddu, parts of Busoga, and parts of the Karagwe, while Kooki was made a tributary. Defeated rulers were replaced with military leaders, which contributed to the increasing unity of the state. Historically, the Banyoro of Bunyoro-Kitara were the Baganda's most hated and despised enemies. They were so hated that the word "Nyoro" became a synonym for "foreigner" and was used to refer to all other tribes whether they were truly ethnic Nyoro or not.

By the 19th century, Buganda was an "embryonic empire". It built fleets of war canoes from the 1840s to take control of Lake Victoria and the surrounding regions and subjugated several weaker peoples. These subject peoples were then exploited for cheap labor. The first Europeans to enter the Kingdom of Buganda were British explorers John Hanning Speke and Captain Sir Richard Francis Burton while searching for the headwaters of the Nile in 1862. They found a highly organized political system.

After Buganda conquered Buddu, it was able to launch raids deep into western Uganda. Kabaka Suna II invaded and plundered the kingdom of Nkore three times. Buganda would eventually conquer territory away from Nkore such as Kabula and significant parts of the Bwera kingdom, whose grazing lands had been used by Hima pastoralists. Mutumbuka, the Mugabe (king) of Nkore, died in 1870, causing a succession crisis which Buganda took advantage of. King Mutesa sent an envoy to intercede. The purpose of the peace envoy was to make a blood brotherhood with Makumbi, who was the leader of the Nkore delegation and one of the legitimate claimants to be the next king of Nkore. Buganda secretly ordered its envoy to massacre as many of Makumbi's followers as possible (to support Makumbi's rival, Mukwenda, who was the pretender to the throne supported by Buganda). The meeting was set in Kabula, where Makumbi's supporters were led into a trap, resulting in over 70 leaders, including 20 princes, being slaughtered. It was "the height of treachery that was difficult to forget" in the Banyankole's eyes. Even in modern times, Banyankole elders were still lamenting the massacre, saying, "Only the Baganda could have thought of such a thing."

=== European Accounts ===
Europeans admired Buganda and often praised the kingdom, considering it the pinnacle of "native political evolution." Early travel, missionary, and colonial accounts often called the Baganda the "most advanced and intelligent of all central African societies."

To Europeans, the Baganda belonged to a distinct political and social order and were thus privileged over other ethnic and cultural groups in the region. Henry Morton Stanley described the Baganda as "an extraordinary people, as different from the barbarous pirates of Uvuma, and the wild, mop-headed men of Eastern Usukuma, as the British in India are from their Afridi fellow-subjects, or the white Americans of Arkansas from the semi-civilized Choctaws."

Perhaps one of the best organised and most civilised of African kingdoms at the present day. In fact, putting aside the empires of Abyssinia and Morocco (as entirely independent states ranking with other world powers), Uganda would take a high place among those purely Negro kingdoms which retain any degree of national rule.

— Harry Johnston, The Uganda Protectorate,

Colonel Lambkin and the explorer Harry Johnston both described the Baganda as the black Japanese or "the Japanese of the dark continent" and "the most naturally civilized, charming, kind, tactful, and courteous of black people." Frederick Lugard claimed that Buganda was "probably the most civilised of any native state in Africa."

Former US President Theodore Roosevelt was amazed by the kingdom when he visited Africa in 1909, claiming that Buganda stood "far above most … in their capacity for progress towards civilization." Visiting Buganda had a profound impact on him and compelled him to rethink his negative views of African people, and even African Americans in the United States. The reality of Buganda's political sophistication commanded his respect.

=== Colonial times ===
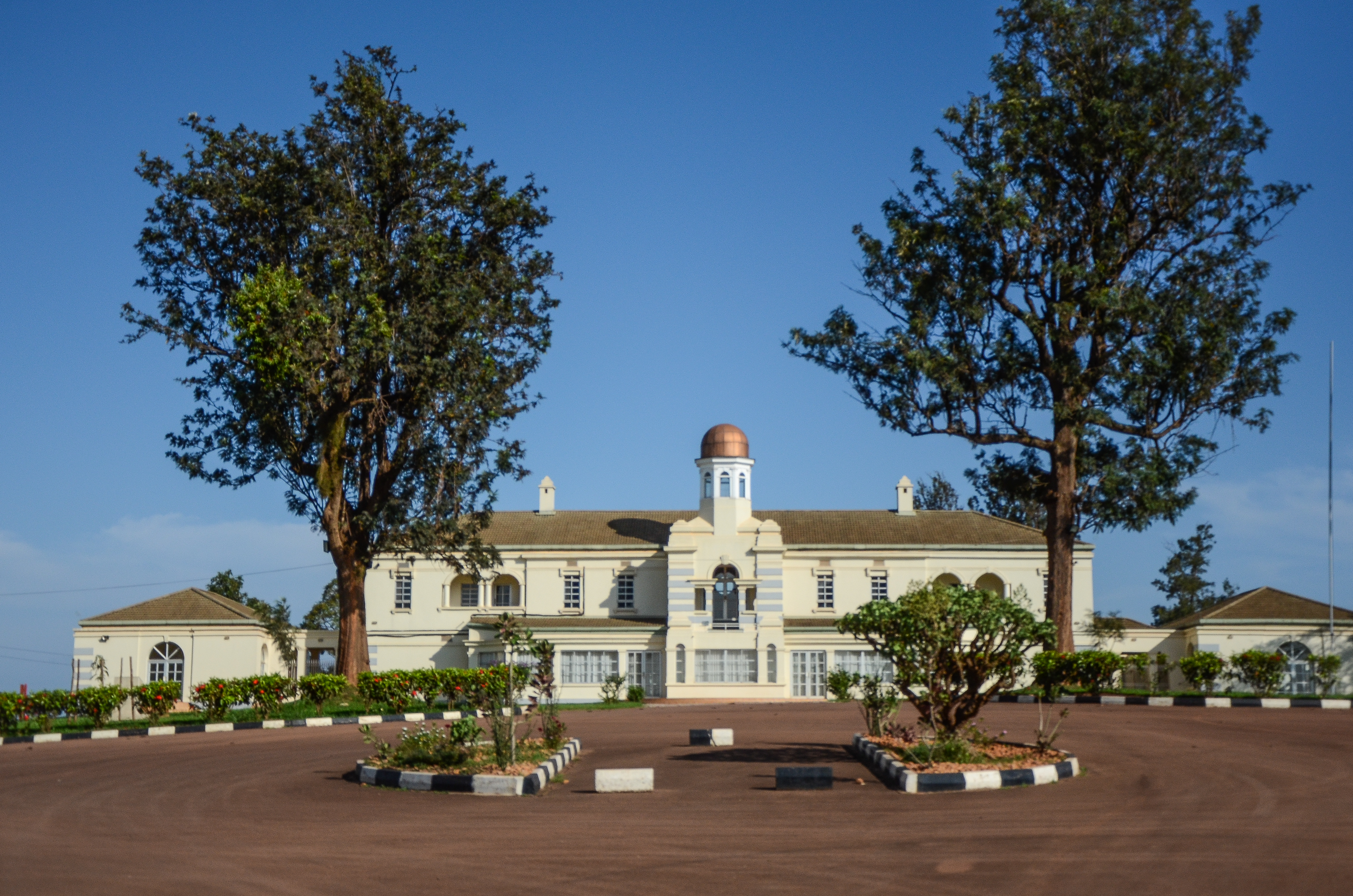
Kabaka Palace in Kampala

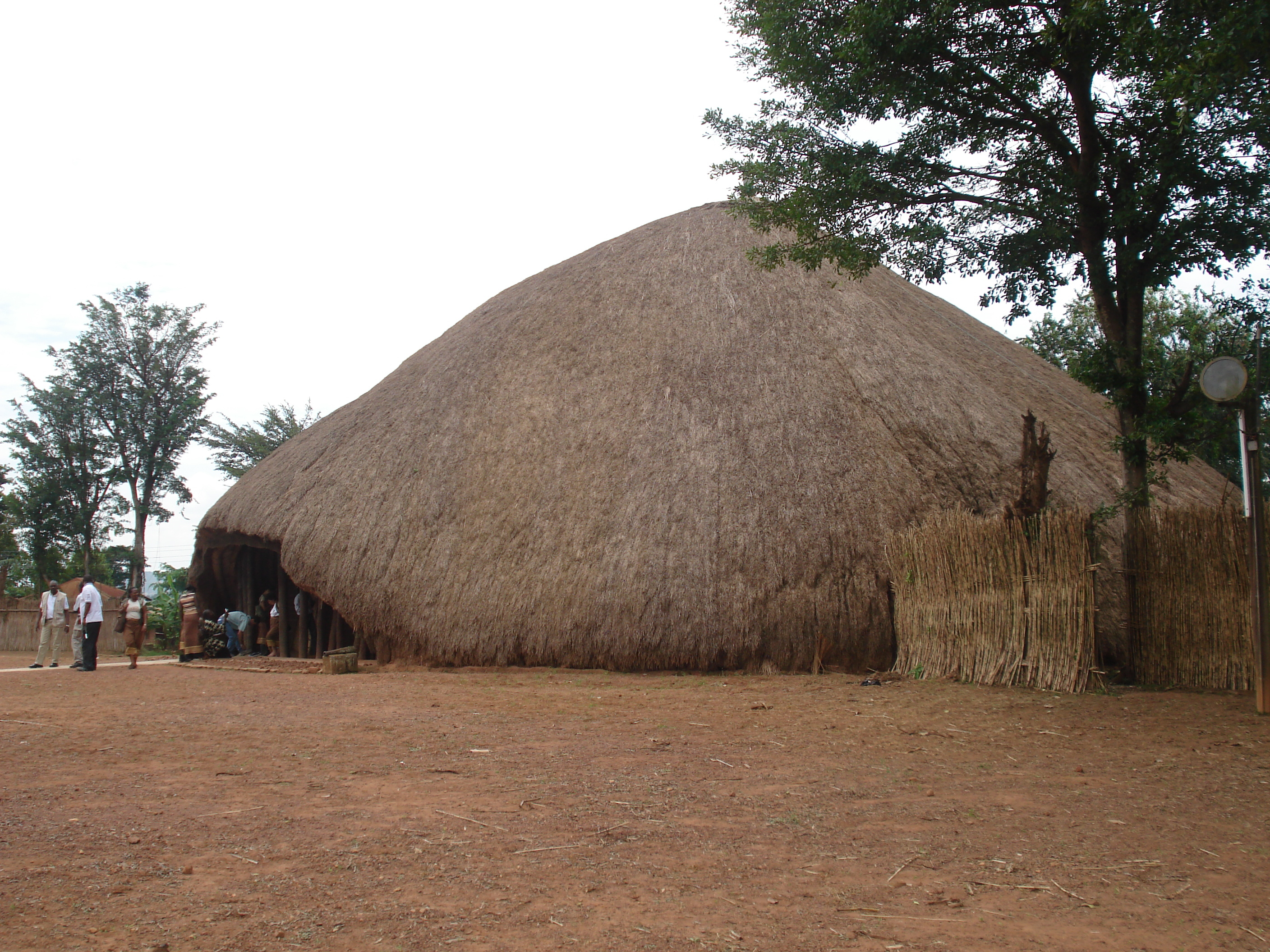
Tombs of Buganda Kings at Kasubi

Buganda was colonized by the British and made a protectorate of the United Kingdom in 1884. The move towards independence reached a climax when the Lukiiko, the parliament of Buganda appointed the Buganda Constitutional Committee in 1959 and later declared independence on 8 October 1960 and requested that the British protectorate be terminated.

While in exile, Mwanga II was received into the Anglican Church and was baptized with the name of Danieri (Daniel). He spent the rest of his life in exile. He died in 1903, at 35 years of age. On 2 August 1910, his remains were repatriated and buried at Kasubi.

On 24 July 1993, the monarchy of Buganda was restored when Ronald Muwenda Mutebi II was crowned king. Ronald Muwenda Mutebi II was the son of King 'Freddy', who had been deposed by the Ugandan government in 1966.

=== Attempted secession in Kayunga ===
In September 2009, some members of the minority Banyala ethnic group, led by the recently retired UPDF Captain Isabanyala Baker Kimeze, announced that Bugerere had seceded from the Kingdom of Buganda. The Banyala make up 0.09% of the population of Uganda and 13% of the population of the district, Kayunga, which they claimed to be leading into secession. Because of the resulting tensions, the government of Uganda prevented the Kabaka of Buganda from traveling to Bugerere, leading to riots in the capital, Kampala and its neighboring districts. Thirty people were killed in what came to be known as the Buganda riots.

=== Previous kings ===
On July 31, 2023, Buganda unveiled portraits of its former kings (bassekabaka) based on oral narrations and written histories dating back to the founding of the kingdom.

== Government ==
Buganda is a constitutional monarchy. The current Head of State is the Kabaka, Muwenda Mutebi II who has reigned since the restoration of the kingdom in 1993. The Head of Government is the Katikkiro (Prime Minister, role established around 1800), currently fulfilled by Charles Mayiga, who was appointed by the Kabaka in 2013. The Parliament of Buganda is the Lukiiko. For much of Buganda's history, clan heads had significant power and influence over the Kabaka, however over time, as clans became social rather than residential groupings, they lost their power. Succession went from brother to brother, who sometimes had different mothers of different clans, inviting power struggles between clan heads. In the 17th and 18th centuries, the Kabakas transitioned chiefly positions from being inherited to appointed.

Prior to the Buganda Agreement of 1900, Buganda was an almost absolute monarchy. Under the Kabaka, there were three types of chief: bakungu (administrative) chiefs, who were appointed directly by the Kabaka; traditional bataka chieftains; and batongole chiefs, who served as representatives of the Kabaka, charged with "maintaining internal security, supervising royal estates and military duties". The 1900 agreement, however, greatly enhanced the power of the Lukiiko (which had previously been simply an advisory council) at the expense of the Kabaka. While Buganda retained self-government, as one part of the larger Uganda Protectorate, it would henceforth be subject to formal British overrule. The Buganda Agreement of 1955 continued the transition from absolute to constitutional monarchy.

During Uganda independence, the constitutional position of Buganda (and the degree to which it would be able to exercise self-government) was a major issue. Discussions as part of the Uganda Relationships Commission resulted in the Buganda Agreement of 1961 and the first Constitution of Uganda (1962), as part of which Buganda would be able to exercise a high degree of autonomy. This position was reversed during 1966–67, however, before the Kabakaship and Lukiiko were disestablished altogether in 1967 before being restored in 1993.

=== Amasaza ===
Buganda is made up of 18 political divisions called Amasaza (singular Saza) in Luganda. These are:

County (Ssaza)	Capital (Mbuga)	Governor's Title (Omwami ow'e Ssaza)
Buddu	Masaka	Ppookino
Bugerere	Ntenjeru	Mugerere
Bulemeezi	Bbowa	Kangawo
Buluuli	Nakasongola	Kimbugwe
Busiro	Ssentema	Ssebwana
Busujju	Mwera-Nsero	Kasujju
Butambala	Kabasanda	Katambala
Buvuma	Maggyo	Mbuubi
Buweekula	Kaweeri	Luweekula
Gomba	Kanoni	Kitunzi
Kabula	Kakondo	Lumaama
Kkooki	Laakaayi	Kamuswaga
Kyaddondo	Kasangati	Kaggo
Kyaggwe	Ggulu	Ssekiboobo
Mawogola	Ssembabule	Muteesa
Mawokota	Butolo	Kayima
Ssese	Kalangala	Kweba
Ssingo	Mityana	Mukwenda

Buganda Kingdom sign post

=== Districts ===
Buganda currently is divided into 26 districts as of 2021. These are:

1. Buikwe
2. Bukomansimbi
3. Butambala
4. Buvuma
5. Gomba
6. Kalangala
7. Kalungu
8. Kampala
9. Kassanda
10. Kayunga
11. Kiboga
12. Kyankwanzi
13. Kyotera
14. Luwero
15. Lwengo
16. Lyantonde
17. Masaka
18. Mityana
19. Mpigi
20. Mubende
21. Mukono
22. Nakaseke
23. Nakasongola
24. Rakai
25. Ssembabule
26. Wakiso

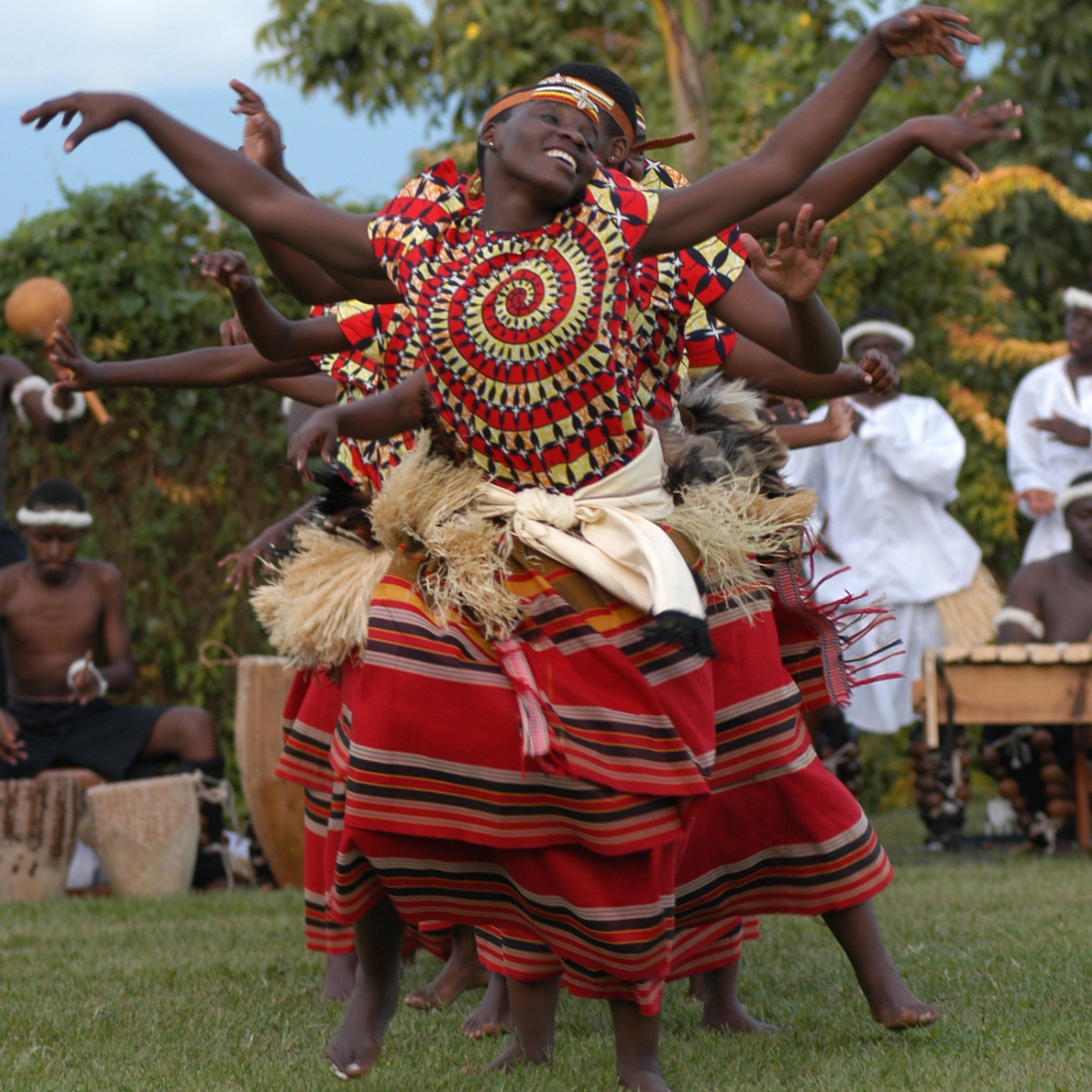
Buganda traditional dance performed by Baganda tribe in Central Uganda on all traditional functions.

== Infrastructure ==
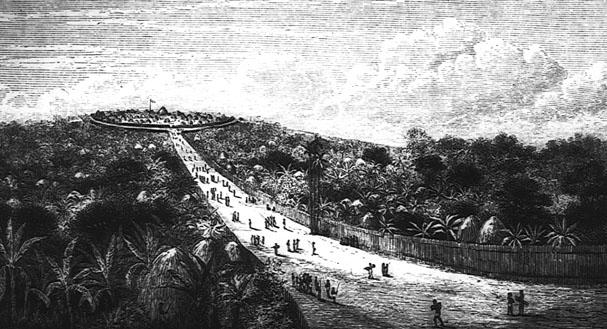
Lubiri in 1875

John Hanning Speke was the first European to visit Buganda. At the royal residence, Speke wrote, "The palace quite surprised me by its extraordinary dimensions, and the neatness with which it was kept. The whole brow and sides of the hill on which we stood were covered with gigantic grass huts, thatched as neatly as so many heads dressed by a London barber, and fenced all round with the tall yellow reeds of the common Uganda tiger-grass; whilst within the enclosure, the lines of huts were joined together, or partitioned off into courts, with walls of the same grass."

The explorer and journalist Henry Morton Stanley visited Buganda after Speke in 1875 and was equally impressed: "Broad avenues [of] reddish clay, strongly mixed with the detritus of hematite led by a gradual ascent to the circular road which made the circuit of the hill outside the palace enclosure. His house is an African palace, spacious and lofty". At Buganda's capital, Lubaga, Stanley found a well-ordered city surrounding the king's palace, which was situated atop a commanding hill. A tall cane fence surrounded the palace compound, which was filled with grass-roofed houses, meeting halls, and storage buildings. Thronging the grounds were foreign ambassadors seeking audiences, chiefs going to the royal advisory council, messengers running errands, and a corps of young pages. He estimated the population of the kingdom at 2,000,000

Population estimates for Kampala, the capital of Buganda, at the time of Kabaka Mutesa, run as high as 77,000. Wrigley thinks that Kampala was probably the largest agglomeration of population in interior Africa, and that it had urban characteristics by the time Mutesa had ascended the throne. Kampala, the capital, was the heart of the Ganda state and the center of the redistributive network that encompassed it.

The Baganda had discovered that rats were carriers of fleas that caused outbreaks of the bubonic plague, and ensured that any overabundance of rats was to be hunted, which greatly improved sanitation and reduced epidemics in their settlements.

Kabaka's Lake is an artificial lake created by King Mwanga for defence.

=== Communication ===
The efficiency of Buganda's military and administrative apparatus was evident in the construction of specially designed roadways equipped with bridges and viaducts that traversed challenging terrains such as streams and wetlands. As a rule, Ganda roads were remarkably straight, cutting over the crests of hills and through valleys, forests, swamps, and rivers. Early visitors to Buganda describe the well-planned and carefully maintained system of roads, which radiated from the capital to all corners of the kingdom. The importance of these rapid means of communication in what the anthropologist Audrey Richards has called a "pedestrian state", especially one whose terrain is covered with dense vegetation and contains innumerable papyrus swamps and streams, is evident. They enabled the king and his officials at the capital to maintain close political contact even with outlying parts of the kingdom, all of which could easily be reached by a runner within a day or two. Buganda's excellent means of communication enabled the Kabaka "to maintain active control over a territory one quarter the size of England without written communication and with no means of travel on land beyond the human foot"

When John Hanning Speke visited Buganda in 1862, he described the kingdom's roads as being "as long as our coach-roads, cut through the long grasses, straight over the hills and down through the woods in the dells—a strange contrast to the wretched tracks in all the adjacent countries."

Water transport was essential for Buganda and greatly helped in the kingdom's expansion via its fleet of war canoes. Water transport also provided a means of political communication between the capital, which was usually sited fairly close to the lake, and outlying areas of the Kingdom along the lake shore, as well as the islands. The island chiefs had to maintain a great fleet of canoes ready for state service. The Mamba clan specialized in water transport and the head of the clan was the admiral of Buganda's navy.

Messages were sent by "runners of athletic renown". These messengers were called bakayungirizi and were trained from an early age in prolonged, rapid marches, moving night and day with only short breaks; King Mutesa had many in his service. These runners were also useful during battles, keeping the kabaka and other military leaders informed of enemy troop movements and rapidly communicating their orders to the warriors on the frontline.

The use of talking drums to spread messages was widespread in Buganda. This drum language had hundreds of distinctive beats or rhythms representing as many specific meanings, making it possible for almost instantaneous communication throughout the kingdom.

== Military ==
Loyalty to their King, Country and Institutions endowed the Baganda with remarkable valour and tenacity in war.

— J.P. Thoonen.

Ganda elders say that "in the old days, the work of men was war". Historians described Buganda as a "war machine/warfare state," with warfare being the main activity that dominated the lives of most Ganda males. Every adult was, in principle, a warrior, and Chiefs were fighting men, each with his own war cry and boastful drumbeat. Armies were regularly sent out during each dry season in all directions against all foreign tribes, returning with much plunder (livestock, slaves, women, etc.). The efficient organisation of Buganda enabled the kingdom to raise and deploy armies which (by local standards) were both huge in numbers and disciplined in conduct. The Baganda army consisted of district levies and each was headed by a royal-appointed chief or governor and remained the basic unit of military organization. All districts were expected to provide soldiers when called by the king. An army usually carried at least a month's supply of food (while also supplementing itself off of plunder in enemy territory).

The kings (Kabaka) would often fight in battle themselves, with some losing their lives. Those who showed great courage in battle would be rewarded by the king and fed by his father at a ceremonial meal. Those shown cowardice could be burned to death on the battlefield. If spared, a piece of banana stem would be tied behind him, in imitation of a woman giving birth, before he was put to women's work.

Kabaka Mawanda's armies struck terror across the region. The name of Mawanda unleashed terror and horror among the kingdoms, with the Basoga saying, "Omuganda Mawanda olumbe lwekirago lwaita mama na taata" (Mawanda, the nefarious Muganda, slaughtered all our mother and father).

Kabaka Kamanya's reign in the early nineteenth century was known as one of "restless warfare" during which "men were not permitted to rest, and even children of fourteen were required to carry each his two spears and shield to war." His successor, Suna, carried on sixteen major military expeditions in a twenty-six-year reign. Under the Reign of Kabaka Suna II, Buganda's borders were strengthened through the perfection of an army organization that was able to field 50,000 warriors. The Katikiro (prime minister) Apollo Kaggwa speaks of wars being waged regularly every six months.

Kabaka Mwanga was able to "throw 50,000 armed men into the field any day."

By attacking Bunyoro, Buganda's armies also "forced people to abandon their homesteads, and disrupted agriculture, trade and redistribution". Over time, Buganda's armies became expert at destroying crops in the field and locating and emptying underground granaries, which led to famine in Bunyoro. James Augustus Grant noted that the Baganda are “constantly plundering the people of Unyoro [Bunyoro]of their cattle”.

The reign of Mutesa I was the zenith of Ganda military power. Under Mutesa, there were sixty-six wars in twenty-eight years. Mutesa led an army of 125,000 warriors supported by 230 war canoes during his campaign against the Sesse Islanders

In the 1890s, raiding parties of up to 20,000 Baganda were mobilized to plunder the rival kingdom of Bunyoro.

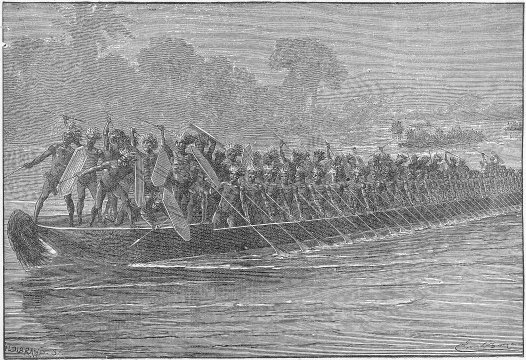
Buganda effectively controlled Lake Victoria using fleets of war canoes from the 1840s

Baganda war canoes could carry 60 to 100 warriors (not including the crew of 50 to 100) and could be as long as over 72 feet. These vessels were organized into a squadron under a leader. When engaged in battle, the paddlers squatted on the sides of the canoes while the warriors stood upright holding spears and shields.

In the year 1800, a military campaign involving canoes was undertaken by the Kabaka Kamanya against the Luo speaking Lango people north of Buganda. This war was noted for its ferocity. The geography of the Lango territory was daunting to the Ganda, the land being intersected by broad rivers and the eastern arms of Lake Kyoga. King Kamanya became extremely frustrated with his inability to overcome the Lango, and so a grand council was held to discuss tactics. They decided to send 100 canoes to Jinja, where they would be disassembled and carried overland through Busoga to the Nagombwa river, where they would be reassembled and proceed to attack the Lango in their rear. At the same time, Kabaka Kamanya himself led another army along the western side of the Nile towards Urondogani and attacked the Lango from that side. The ensuing battle was eventually, if not easily, won.

In 1878, Mutesa sent a fleet to Ukerewe Island, where it helped the local ruler, Lukonge, put down a rebellion. The next year, the Baganda mounted successful slave raids against Busoga and the Buvuma Islands. Buganda's navy also conducted slave raids against the Luhya and Luo people on the coasts of western Kenya

== Demographics ==
Buganda had a projected population of about 11,952,600 people in 2021.

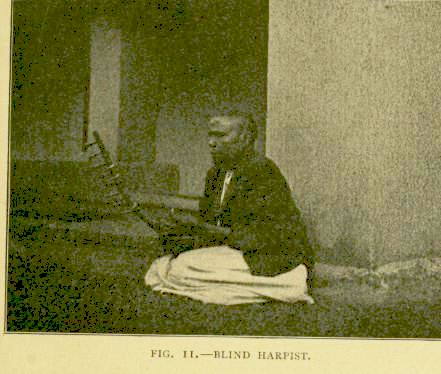
A blind Buganda harpist c. 1911

=== Clans of Baganda ===
As of 2009, there were at least 52 recognized clans within the kingdom, with at least another four making a claim to clan status. Within this group of clans, there are four distinct sub-groups, which reflect historical waves of immigration to Buganda.

==== Nansangwa ====
The oldest clans trace their lineage to Bakiranze Kivebulaya, who is supposed to have ruled in the region from about 400 AD until about 1300 AD. These seven clans are referred to as the Nansangwa, or the indigenous:

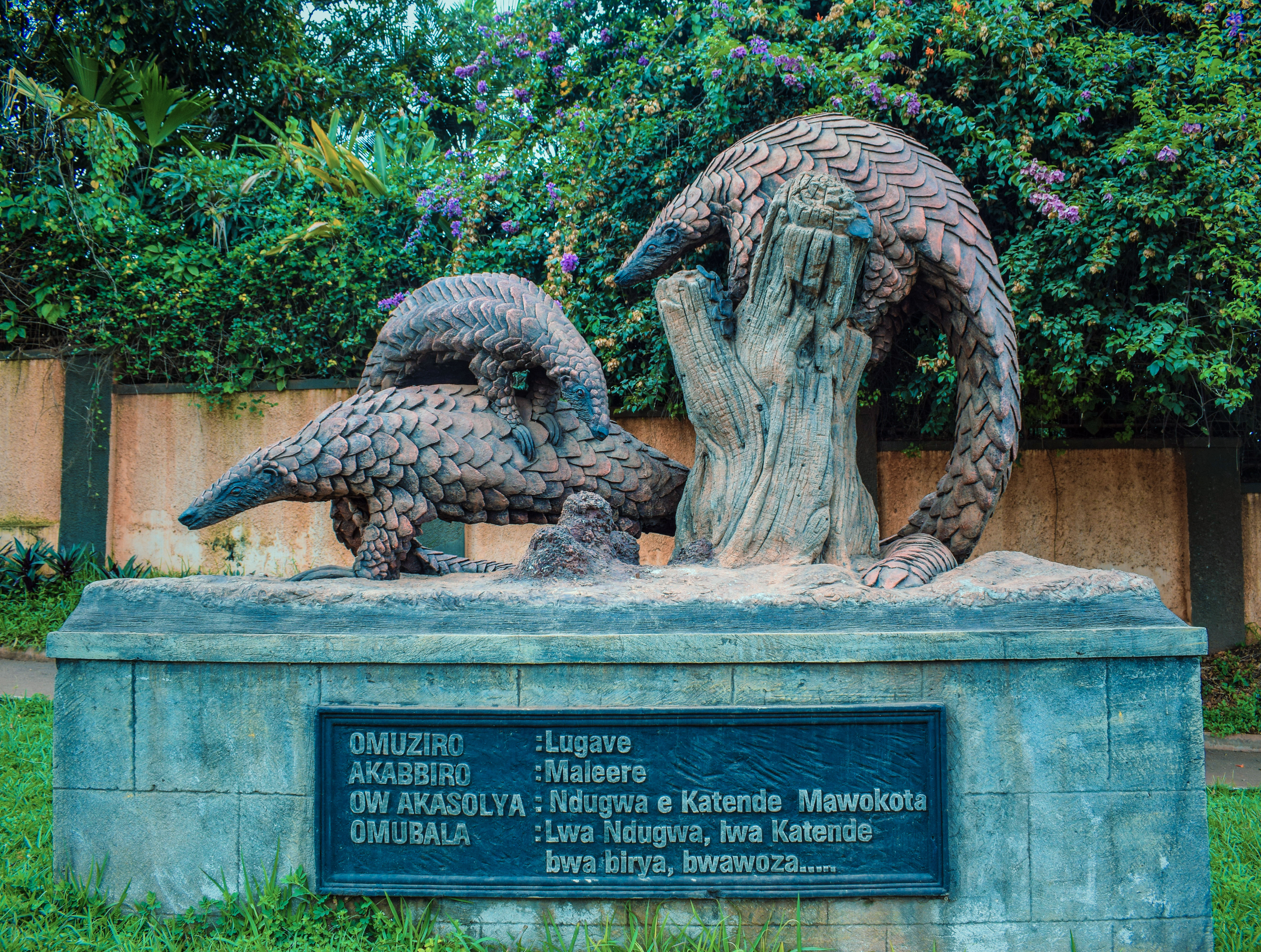
1. Lugave Clan
  Lugave (Pangolin)
2. Mmamba (Lungfish)
3. Ngeye (Colobus monkey)
4. Njaza (Reedbuck)
5. Ennyange (Cattle egret)
6. Fumbe (Civet cat)
7. Ngonge (Otter)
8. Mpindi (Cowpea)
9. Ngabi Ennyunga (Bushbuck)

==== Kintu migration ====
The Abalasangeye dynasty came to power through the conquests of Kabaka of Buganda ssekabaka Kintu, which are estimated to have occurred sometime between 1200 and 1400 AD.

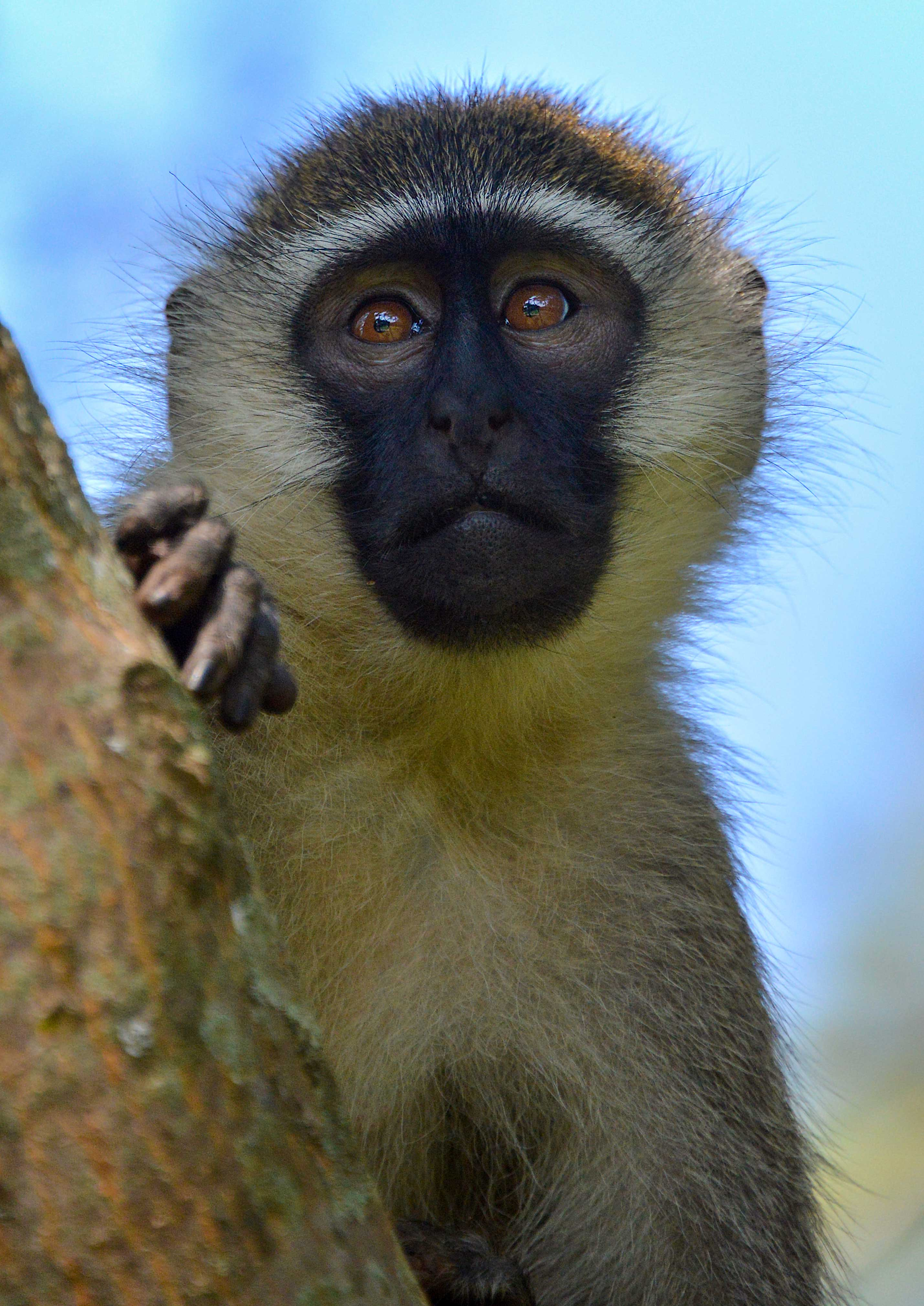
Vervet Monkey in Uganda

Thirteen clans that are believed to have come with Kintu:

1. Ekkobe (Liana fruit)
2. Mbwa (Dog)
3. Mpeewo (Oribi antelope)
4. Mpologoma (Lion)
5. Namuŋoona (Pied crow)
6. Ngo (Leopard)
7. Ŋonge (Otter)
8. Nte (cow)
9. Nkejje (Cichlids)
10. Nkima (Vervet monkey)
11. Ntalaganya (Blue duiker)
12. Nvubu (Hippopotamus)
13. Nvuma (Pearl)

The descendants of the Basimba people (also known as Bashimba) which is a Bisa and Ambo nickname of the Clan of the leopards, the bena Ngo in Zambia, who settled at Mpogo, Sironko District, are among the Ngo Clan group that come along with Kabaka Kato Kintu in his immigration.

==== Kato Kimera migration ====
Around 1370 AD another wave of immigration began, assisted by Kabaka Kimera, who was the son of Omulangira Kalemeera. Kabaka Kimera was born in Kibulala, and returned to Buganda with Jjumba of the Nkima clan and other Buganda elders.

These eleven clans are:

1. Bugeme
2. Butiko (Mushrooms)
3. Kasimba (Genet)
4. Kayozi (Jerboa)
5. Kibe (Fox)
6. Mbogo (Buffalo)
7. Musu/Omusu (Edible rat)
8. Ngabi Ensamba(Antelope)
9. Nkerebwe (Jungle Shrew)
10. Nsuma (snout fish)
11. Nseenene (Copiphorini)

=== Major cities and towns ===
The largest city in Buganda is Kampala. Others include Masaka City, Entebbe, Nansana, Kira, Makindye-Ssabagabo, Njeru and Mukono.

=== Education ===
Education in Buganda is divided between primary, secondary and higher education.

=== Ethnic groups ===
The majority of people in Buganda are Baganda. Other ethnic groups include the Basoga, Banyankole, Bagisu, Bateeso, Bayindi.

=== Religion ===
There are several religions practiced in Buganda. The largest are Catholicism, Anglicanism, Islam, and the traditional Kiganda religion. Some people practice both traditional religions as well as Christianity or Islam.

== Economy ==
=== Currency ===
Barkcloth may have been the first currency in Buganda according to historian E. Bakaluba. Blue beads became the state curency during the reign of Kyabaggu of Buganda (c.1750–1780). These beads may have been introduced through trade contact with the north. Ivory discs placed on strings called obusanga were circulated as currency under Kabaka Junju (c.1790–1800). These gradually replaced glass beads.

Cowries in turn, replaced obusanga by the mid-19th century. Holes were bored into the cowries in order to be placed on strings of 100 shells called kiasa. This could be divided into halves of fifty and further more into five parts of ten each. Such organization made cowries effective for small transaction. In Colonial Uganda and the East Africa Protectorate, the Indian rupee became official currency. Cowries were phased out by the British Colonial government through local institutions like the Lukiko. Despite prohibition, cowries remained in use among the locals.

=== Agriculture ===
Farming was the backbone of Buganda's economy. In contrast with many other East African economic systems, cattle played only a minor role. Many Baganda hired laborers from outside Buganda to herd the Baganda's cattle, for those who owned livestock. Bananas were the most important staple food, providing the economic base for the region's dense population growth. Bananas can grow and produce fruit on the same land for 70 years and it is 2-3 times more productive than sorghum or finger millet and gives 10 times more in yields than yams. The Banana does not require shifting cultivation or bush fallowing to maintain soil fertility and only needed some weeding and mulching, which was usually done by women. A single woman tending to a Banana garden was able to feed 10 men. Women did most of the agricultural work, while men often engaged in commerce and politics (and in precolonial times, warfare). Before the introduction of woven cloth, traditional clothing was manufactured from the bark of trees.

=== Pastoralism ===
Unlike the kingdoms of Tooro, Ankole, and Busongora in the grasslands to the west, Buganda's land was not ideal for pastoralism. This was because most of its territory was covered in dense vegetation and many rolling hills, which could not support large concentrations of cattle. The kingdom never developed a cattle culture like its neighbors (Europeans noted that the Baganda were snobbish about the keeping of cattle); The Baganda even regarded pastoral communities as inferior. Despite this, the Ganda still continued to keep small herds of cattle (small by the standards of the western kingdoms like Ankole). Cattle were seen as simple commodities like goats or chickens and not symbols of kingship and power, and there was never any "racial" or linguistic distinction between farmers and pastoralists in Buganda. The King and chiefs were able to maintain large herds of cattle (due to their greater wealth), while ordinary people had smaller herds (some as small as 1 or 2 cattle). Women often took care of cattle.

The Bahima (a foreign pastoralist group from western Uganda) entered Buganda to be employed to herd cattle for the Baganda (other Hima were captured as slaves). Since cattle have no great ritual significance in Buganda, the hima's pastoralism did not give them the prestige they had in some of the western kingdoms, and thus they were subordinate to the Baganda. The agricultural Baganda referred to the pastoral Bahima as menial slaves and "insanitary rustics" (due to the Bahima habit of smearing their bodies with butter) and looked down on them as being culturally inferior. A famine (which was rare) struck Buganda after Suna became king, the Bahima people worked very hard to supply their masters with milk. The Hima were overall regarded as alien and not to be trusted. There was a plot against Kayira, the Katikiro (Prime Minister) of Buganda during the reign of Mutesa. The plot against him was meant to have him removed from his position. His political enemies accused him of being "a Munyoro and a Muhima"; he replied that his mother was hima and it was deemed insufficient reasoning for his removal.

Buganda's western expansion and its conquest of territory formerly owned by Bunyoro and Ankole gave it control of vast new lands ideal for pastoralism. John Roscoe explains the successful expansions of the agricultural Kingdom of Buganda against its more pastoralist rival, Bunyoro:

The pastoral Banyoro had no care for agricultural land, but only wanted good pasture land, and gardens were not considered so important by them as they would have been by the Baganda, who combined cattle rearing with agriculture, and who meted out every yard of land to some chief, who was expected to people and cultivate it, and who would be deposed, if he failed in these respects. Hence, large tracts of the country were wrested from the Banyoro by the Baganda with little expenditure of force before the former people really felt the loss of their land. Another reason which caused the king of Bunyoro to overlook the importance of land was the custom of estimating greatness and wealth according to the number of cattle that a man had. So long, therefore, as the herds escaped the punitive expeditions of the Baganda, little heed was paid by the Banyoro to encroachments into their land; thus the Baganda yearly pressed back the Banyoro herdsmen, settled in large numbers upon the newly acquired land, and extended their boundaries.

=== Crafts ===
Craftsmen were highly specialised, and their leaders were honoured. The royal craftsmen were a protected minority who were gifted land and were exempt from paying taxes or labour duties. The blacksmiths, especially, were extremely skilled, and their work was highly specialized and sought after. Margaret Trowell describes further:

The leader of the royal craftsmen and often his second in command holds a hereditary position and comes from one particular clan, although the workmen under him may be of any clan. But among the smiths many of the clans seem to have their own closed groups where all the workmen will be of one clan and where only a certain type of work is done. Thus the Nvubu clan have always been makers of the royal shields and the bracelets, anklets and other ornaments for the Kings' wives; while the Ente clan make the weapons and agricultural implements.

Leather working and tanning was an important industry and employed significant numbers of subjects. An account from 1874 describes the tanning of leather by the bakopi (commoners) who made large sheets of leather that were "beautifully tanned and sewed together". A resident missionary in 1879 reported purchasing dyed leather skins cut in the shape of a hat. Cowhides were fashioned into sandals worn by the elite and priests since before the 18th century, with buffalo hides specifically worn by chiefs and the elite.

As early as the 1860s, professional smiths attached to the court were making ammunition for imported firearms, and by 1892, Federick Lugard observed that the Ganda smiths: "will construct you a new stock to a rifle which you will hardly detect from that made by a London gun-maker. The Fundi Kisule is an accomplished blacksmith and gunsmith, and will make a new spring or repair any damaged rifle with admirable workmanship. Their folding stools of rod iron, and their beautifully-tumed-out spears, attest their ability as blacksmiths."

=== Slavery ===
It was said that the average Muganda owned one hundred slaves; even youths possessed "ten or twenty...whom they steal or kidnap in war". This was an exaggeration that conveyed some idea of the impression foreigners had of Ganda slavery and its extensive nature. The vast majority of slaves in Buganda were from foreign ethnic groups such as the Banyoro, Basoga, and Banyankole. The Ganda sold other Ganda only in extremely exceptional circumstances, and various Kabakas, such as Suna, banned the sale of any native Ganda to foreigners. Only cows, goats, and ivory could be sold.

As a rule slaves were foreigners, chiefly Banyoro and Basoga; Baganda who were slaves were treated with much consideration in their own country; they were men and women who had been sold by a relative in trouble, children who had been kidnapped, or who had been pawned to raise money in an emergency. The status of slavery was not so dreadful in Uganda as in many other countries. In many cases the worst that could be said against it was that a slave was deprived of his freedom, that neither his wife nor her children were his own, and that his life was at his master's disposal. On the other hand if a man married his slave girl, and she had children, she became free.

— Richard J. Reid, Political Power in Pre-colonial Buganda Economy, Society & Warfare in the Nineteenth Century, p 126

Ganda slave raiders invaded Bunyoro-Kitara throughout the 1800s and local missionaries would report vast numbers of slaves captured from Buganda's enemy kingdom. The explorer John Hanning Speke witnessed the Ganda army returning from Bunyoro with "immense numbers of cows, women and children, but not men, for they were killed". Hundreds of slaves from Bunyoro were paraded at Kabaka Mutesa's court as a show of victory over their defeated enemies.

The Hima (a pastoralist group) were especially sought out as slaves in raids into the foreign western kingdoms such as Ankole and Busongora. Hima women were considered highly attractive by the Ganda and were popular as concubines. Many Hima women were put in the harems of chiefs and the Kabaka. Many cattle in Buganda were herded by enslaved Bahima herdsmen taken prisoners in war.

In the 1860s, kingdoms in Tanzania such as Unyanyembe and Urambo regarded slaves they purchased from Buganda as being the best available, especially the Hima women, (who were also brought from Karagwe). The export of slaves increased steadily through the 1860s and 1870s, reaching a peak in the 1880s, when as many as several thousand may have been exported annually.

Foreign slaves could be harshly treated, as in the case of a Hima slave who tended the Katikiro's (prime minister's) cattle. The Hima decided to leave his master and serve the king. The prime minister seized the Hima (on false pretenses) and had his ears cut off, and his eyes gouged out as a warning to his other slaves not to leave him (not even for the king).

There was also a high demand for slaves from east of the Nile. Historian David William Cohen says that "Ganda men relished the supposed attributes of women from Busoga, finding their elegant bodies beautiful and their separation from the tense, competitive arenas of Ganda politics a great virtue". In order to appease the Baganda, the Basoga would send tribute to Buganda which included slave women. Baganda and Basoga alike participated in the kidnapping and transport of slaves. After the year 1850, no place in Busoga was hallowed sanctuary due to the scourge of kidnappings. While in Buganda, Emin Pasha witnessed hundreds of women brought in from Busoga. Slaves taken in war were usually distributed among the chiefs (a chief named Mende had 700 female slaves). Due to the military campaigns led by Kabaka Suna, there were so many women captives that Suna gifted 2,000 to his mother, 80 to Sebowa (the Katabalwa), and the remainder were taken to the Court and distributed among his wives who ruled over them as they wished. It is estimated that Buganda had a sex ratio of 3.5:1 due to the vast numbers of foreign female slaves taken into the kingdom.

== Culture and society ==
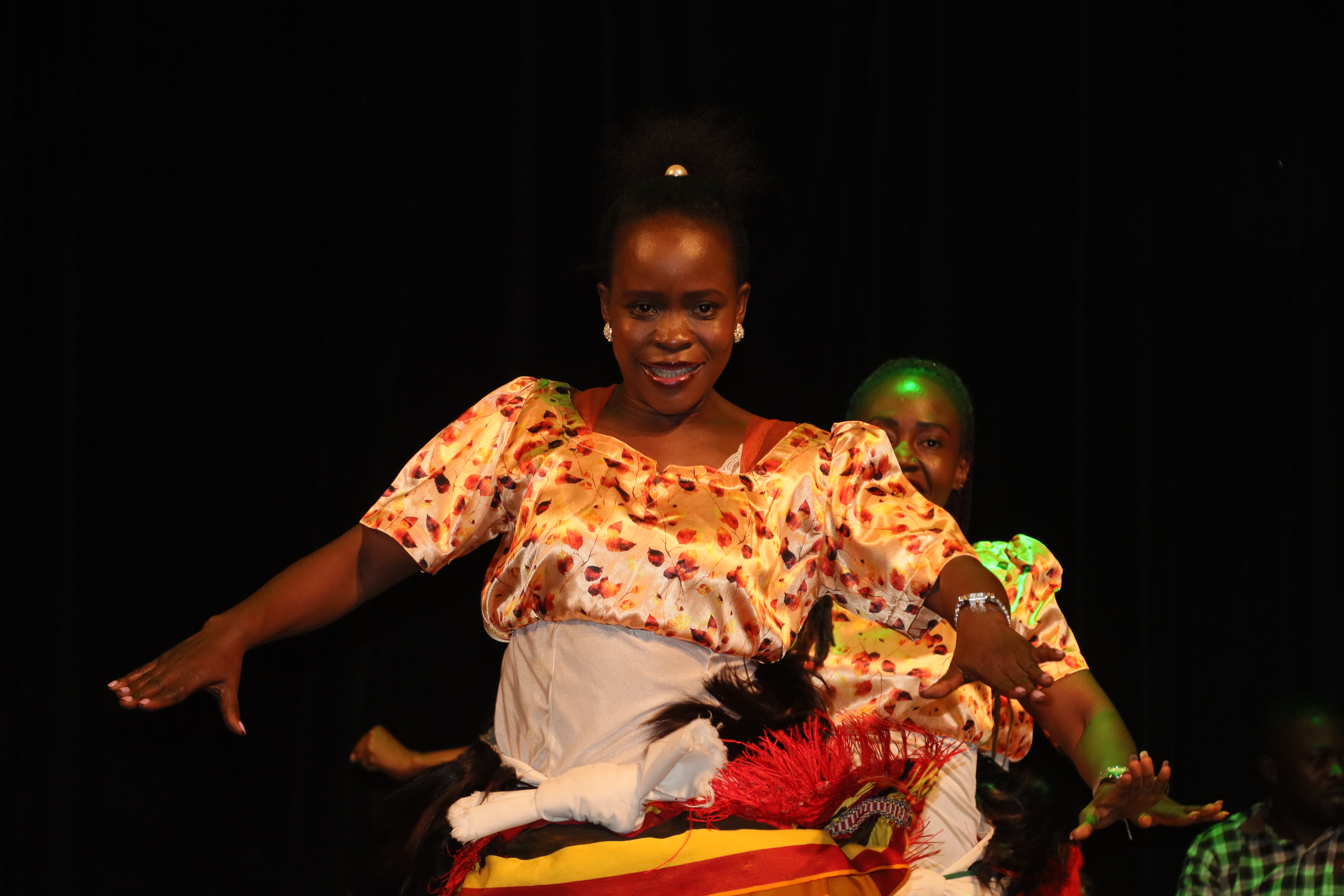
Cultural dance

=== Women and royal power ===
Pre-colonial Buganda was a strongly hierarchical and patriarchal kingdom. However, of the three people who could be called "Kabaka" or king, two were women: the queen mother (Namasole) and the queen sister (Lubuga). The queen mother was the most important woman in the kingdom and had political and ritual powers that resembled the king. The Namasole possessed her own courts and estates and had the power to collect taxes.

The Lubuga effectively shared the throne with her brother and had the same powers he had, for example, she controlled land throughout the country with estates in each district, and she had her own courts and her own chiefs with the same titles as those of the king's chiefs. For their own subjects, the Namasole and Lubuga were the final decision makers and arbiters. The Lubuga's palace was about twice the size of that of an important wife of the king. The others had more elaborate palaces. After the death of a king, the lùbugà took the title nnaalinnya (I will soon ascend) and became responsible for protecting the shrines in which the deceased king's jawbone and umbilical cord were kept. This shrine was where the òmuzimù (spirit) of the king resided and so "the lùbugà/nnaalinnya held significant creative power even after leaving office."

The senior wives of the king would also warrant special respect and had status and privilege within Ganda society. She was considered superior to all other chiefs and technically the most powerful commoner, being a royal by marriage. The Katikkiro (prime minister) and most chiefs in Buganda were under the control of the elite titled wives of the king The titled wives were privy to state secrets and were heavily involved in court politics and in vying for power through their sons and clans. Since succession was decided by the king's mothers clan, in order to consolidate clan support, the sons of the king adopted the totems of their mothers and not of their fathers.

Women would also participate in military campaigns. Princess Nakuyita was second in command of Kabaka Sunna II's army in the early 1800s.

The Àbàmbejja (Princesses) had many privileges, including the right to own land. They were shown great respect by chiefs and were exempted from many restrictions faced by the commoner women. Under Mutesa I, princesses were given to chiefs to consolidate their patron-client relations. Many princesses became spirit wives by 'marrying' the Balùbaalè (national deities) and were thus able to mobilise creative power to influence the king and the queen mother. One princess was instrumental in deposing the Katikkiro (prime minister), Kayira, because they felt he had claimed too much power. Princess Ndege Nassolo organized a successful rebellion of chiefs and princes against her brother, the cruel king Kagulu (1674–1704). Kagulu managed to escape capture after his capital fell but was later caught. Ndege Nassolo had Kagulu drowned in Lake Victoria.

In the 13th-15th centuries, women are said to have ruled as Kabaka; Sir John Gray claims that there is abundant evidence of this. One such ruler was Naku, the daughter of Mukibi, the founder of the Lugave (Pangolin) clan and the wife of Kabaka Kimera. Naku was so powerful that every king that followed Kimera took a wife from her clan and called her Naku. Ganda history remembers another female Kabaka, Queen Nanono, wife of Kabaka Nakibinge (1494–1524), gained her fame from a battle with the Banyoro at Mpigi (which the Baganda lost) while pregnant. After finding out the king had died in battle, she rallied the Baganda warriors and prevented further losses. Thereafter she ruled the country for eighteen months and would have been chosen kabaka had she birthed a male child. Queen Nanano belonged to the Ngo (Leopard) clan, which brought prestige to her clan-mates, who initiated a new name for their daughters: Nnabulya (we also ruled).

=== Cinema ===
Several actors and actresses have been very influential in Kiganda drama including Sam Bagenda of the Ebonies, Mariam Ndagire, Aloysius Matovu, Abby Mukiibi, Charles Ssenkubuge, Alex Mukulu, Kato Lubwama, Benon Kibuuka, Nana Kagga, Sarah Kisawuzi, Ashraf Ssemwogerere, Ahmed Lubowa, Waswa Charles Ssentamu (writter) and Hellen Lukoma.

=== Cuisine ===
Kiganda cuisine is dominated by matooke, a banana cultivar. The matooke is sometimes prepared as part of Katogo. The main dishes are almost always served with stew, soup or sauce.

=== Fashion ===
According to Christopher Wrigley, "The Ganda were careful, even prudish, about the covering of the body; and cotton cloth, though known since the end of the eighteenth century, was a great rarity until about 1870 and did not become general until the colonial period. Some use was made of animal skins, but the preferred form of dress was bark-cloth, which also had other uses such as bedding and wrapping of goods."

Historically, barkcloth was the textile of choice mainly worn by the royals from the days of Ssekabaka Kimera and later everyone else starting with the reign of Ssekabaka Semakookiro. Barkcloth is no longer as popular as it once was and has been replaced with cotton and silk. However, some fashion designers like Jose Hendo, still use it today. Barkcloth is also worn as a symbol of protest, mourning, or both. The traditional dress is the Kanzu for men and the Gomesi for women. However, Western-style fashion is very popular these days.

Some of the more common hairstyles are Bantu knots (especially Bitutwa), cornrows, Pencil braids (Biswahili), Braids, Crotchets, Weaves and Afros.

Some accessories may include necklaces, anklets, earrings, bracelets and waist beads ( or obutiti and they are always worn under ones clothes i.e. undergarments).

=== Language and literature ===
The Luganda language is widely spoken in Uganda and is the most popular language in Uganda along with English. Luganda is also widely spoken in and around other countries in East Africa, such as Kenya, Tanzania and Rwanda. It is even used in South Sudan, mostly for business transactions. Luganda is the most spoken local language in Uganda. Despite all efforts made by different governments to promote Kiswahili over the language, it has survived and is still growing.

In literature and common discourse, Buganda is often referred to as Central Uganda.

Buganda has several famous writers like Michael Nsimbi, Solomon E. K. Mpalanyi, Edward Namutete Kawere, Ulysses Chuka Kibuuka, and Apollo Kaggwa.

=== Music ===
The ancient court music composers of Buganda discovered how human auditory perception processes a complex sequence of rapid, irregular sound impulses by splitting the total image into perceptible units at different pitch levels. They had made use of their discovery in composition, creating indirectly polyphonies of interweaving melodic lines that would suggest words to a Luganda speaker, as if some spirit were talking to the performers of a xylopnone or to the lone player of a harp (ennanga). The combination of the first two Xylophone parts creates 'illusory' melodic patterns that exist only in the observers mind, not actually played by either of the first two musicians directly. That these 'resultant' or 'inherent' patterns are materialised only in the minds of listeners is a remarkable feature of Bugandan music. It is probably the oldest example of an audio-psychological effect known as auditory streaming (first recognized in western literature as the melodic fission effect) to delliberately occur in music. The music would be produced by regular movement, with the fingers or sticks combining two interlocking tone-rows, but the patterns heard would be irregular, often asymmetric and complex. All the 102 xylophone compositions that were transcribed by Gerhard Kubik In Buganda during the early 1960s reveal an extremely complex structure, and they "fall apart' in perception-generated innerent melodlc-rhythmic patterns. No one, so far, has Succeeded in composing a new piece that would match in quality and complexity those compositions handed down for generations. Some of them can even be dated by correlating the accompanying song texts with the reign of past kings.

Several genres of music are popular in Buganda. Musicians produce traditional Kiganda music, Kadongo Kamu, Zouk, Dancehall and Reggae. Some of the most famous Kiganda musicians and performers are Annet Nandujja, Elly Wamala, Fred Masagazi, Herman Basudde, Paulo Kafeero, Gerald Kiweewa and Willy Mukabya, Fred Ssebata, Fred Ssebale, Mathias Walukagga.

=== Tourism ===
Buganda has several tourist attractions and cultural sites including the Kasubi Tombs, and Ssese Islands.

== See also ==
- Baganda Music
- Gomesi
- Kabaka of Buganda
- Kanzu
- King's African Rifles (KAR)
- The legend of Kintu
- Luganda language
- Mpindi clan
- Mutesa II of Buganda
- Muwenda Mutebi II of Buganda
- Uganda Cowries

== Bibliography ==
- Osterhammel, Jürgen (2015). The Transformation of the World: A Global History of the Nineteenth Century. Translated by Patrick Camiller. Princeton, New Jersey; Oxford: Princeton University Press. ISBN 978-0691169804.
