= Gold Scandal =

Ugandan political scandal in 1965

The Gold Scandal of 1965 was a significant political scandal in Uganda that played a key role in the lead up to the Mengo Crisis of 1966. The scandal centered on allegations of illegal profiteering from gold, ivory, and cash originating from the Democratic Republic of the Congo. Accusations were made against Prime Minister Milton Obote, Colonel Idi Amin, and other high-ranking government officials. The accusations, brought forth by Member of Parliament Daudi Ochieng, alleged that these officials had illicitly benefited from transactions related to covert aid supplied to Congolese rebel leaders. The scandal involved accusations of large sums of money being deposited into personal accounts, and it deeply destabilized the political climate in Uganda, contributing to the subsequent political turmoil.

== Background ==
Prime Minister of Uganda Milton Obote was politically opposed to Democratic Republic of the Congo Prime Minister Moise Tshombe. Obote arranged for meetings with Congolese rebel leaders Christophe Gbenye and Nicholas Olenga to offer them covert aid. Lasting from December 1964 to March 1965, the meetings frequently involved the exchange of arms which Obote procured from Tanzania and the rebels paid for with gold and ivory. The support also included direct military assistance from the Ugandan Army. Obote had most of this effort executed by Colonel Idi Amin without the knowledge of other military leaders. There was division in the Ugandan cabinet on the policy taken towards the rebels, as it strained relations with the Congolese government and with the United States.

== Events ==
On 16 March 1965 KY MP Daudi Ochieng lodged an accusation in Parliament that Colonel Idi Amin—a high ranking officer in the army, Obote, Minister of Internal Affairs Felix Onama, and Minister of Planning and Community Development Adoko Nekyon, had illegally profited off of gold, ivory, and cash originating from the Congo. According to Ochieng, in February 1965 Amin opened an account with the Ottoman Bank. Within 24 days, Sh.340,000 (£17,000 sterling, equivalent to £415,758 in 2023) was deposited in the account. The government promised to investigate the matter. A Judicial Commission of Inquiry was set up for the purpose, but its establishment was delayed by existing army regulations. The rules required that an army officer could only be investigated by persons of equal or higher rank. Only the army commander Shaban Opolot held a higher rank than Amin, and no officer was of a rank equivalent to Amin. Obote planned on having the rules rewritten to make the establishment of the commission easier, but the Attorney General's office decided instead to revise all army regulations, which took additional time. The inquiry was further delayed by the fact that many of the Congolese rebels which the commission wished to interview had been driven out of their country and had divided themselves into different factions. Minister of Defence Felix Onama was not able to meet with any of them until August. By September, no action had been taken, and in a closed session of Parliament Ochieng introduced a motion that would urge the government to act on the accusations. Obote assured the legislature that progress was being made in the investigation and Ochieng withdrew his motion.

In January 1966 Ochieng, frustrated by the wait in the publishing of a report on the investigation, decided to reintroduce his motion urging the government to take action. On 31 January Obote met with the UPC parliamentary group in secret to explain the delays. He stated that Amin had confirmed that the bank account belonged to him, and that the money had been given to him by Congolese rebels so that he could purchase supplies for them. The group decided that the matter involved sensitive information pertaining to national security, so all UPC MPs would reject Ochieng's motion to avoid an open debate in Parliament on the investigation's findings. "For reasons that are not quite clear", Obote then left the capital, Kampala, to go on a tour of northern Uganda. Shortly before the session of Parliament on 4 February was convened, the cabinet hurriedly met without him. Only half of the ministers attended, and most of those present were sympathetic to Ibingira. The decision was then made that all UPC MPs should support the resolution. According to lawyer and intelligence officer Akena Adoko, the meeting and decision was taken at Ibingira's initiative on advice from his political ally, President Edward Mutesa, who reportedly told him, "Let us join forces right now. Obote and ministers loyal to him are all out, you are the Cabinet boss, let Cabinet meet now and reverse the decision not to support my motion. This has given me much pains. You and I can do wonders working together." Ochieng's motion was soon thereafter tabled in Parliament and debated by its members. The motion, which was seconded by Gesparo Oda, representing the Democratic Party, read as follows:

That this House do urge Government to suspend from duty Col Idi Amin of the Uganda Army forthwith pending conclusion of police investigations into the allegations regarding his bank account which should then be passed on to the appropriate public authority whose final decision on the matter shall be made public.

During the speech in which he presented the motion, Ochieng also accused Obote, Onama, and Minister of Planning and Community Development Adoko Nekyon of being complicit in Amin's alleged activities. He argued that this was the reason for delay in the publishing of the commission's findings. Ochieng stated that an anonymous person had disclosed to him that Obote had received £50,000 worth of stolen gold, ivory, and coffee, and that Onama and Nekyon had each received £25,000 worth. He thus explained that the money deposited in Amin's account was a gratuity for giving them the trafficked goods. Ochieng also stated that another anonymous person had informed him that Amin was promised command of the army for his alleged actions. He further accused Amin of being involved in a plot with members of the government to launch a coup and dissolve the constitution. (Note: Ochieng substantiated this claim with a heated conversation he had with Dan Nabudere, who said that a revolution was about to occur in Uganda. Political scientist Akiiki B. Mujaju noted that it was unlikely that Nabudere was working with Obote to launch a coup, as a UPC committee chaired by Obote had expelled Nabudere from the UPC for being too left-leaning.) Ochieng concluded that Amin would reveal these details if he were formally court martialed; thus, Obote, Onama, and Neykon were not conducting a meaningful investigation. Oda stated that had he known of these new accusations, he would have encouraged Ochieng to include them in the proposed resolution. Nevertheless, he did not suggest that it should then be amended. Two MPs stated that they were aware that a significant amount of gold had passed in and out of the country in recent years. Other members reiterated that there had been rumours in Kampala about the flow of gold and other valuables.

Parliament passed the resolution with a single dissenting vote from Kakonge. (Note: Many writers and commentators, including Mutesa, have characterised the near-unanimous nature of the vote as an unambiguous defeat for the government, signifying a decline of Obote's parliamentary support and perhaps tantamount to a vote of no confidence. Mujaju disagreed with this assessment, noting that the debate surrounding the motion was highly charged (including a threat of violence from one MP to another). Mujaju also noted that even Ibingira did not appear to consider the vote a significant defeat for the government. Furthermore, several MPs, including Onama (who was both a minister and an elected member of Parliament) expressed sympathy with Kakonge's vote.) Kakonge stated that the sudden reversal of the UPC parliamentary group's decision by the cabinet was unusual and must have been the product of a careful strategy. The rest of the UPC MPs had been informed of the cabinet's decision to accept the motion only when the debate opened—unaware that many ministers had not participated in the discussion—and followed the direction of their government.

Though the motion had only pertained to Amin, Ochieng's accusations had attacked the credibility of Obote, Onama, and Nekyon, and it seemed apparent to leaders that a new, independent inquiry had to be made. Several MPs had suggested during the debate that an investigation be made so that the three ministers could prove their innocence. Cuthbert Joseph Obwangor, the government's spokesperson in Parliament and the chairman of the cabinet in Obote's absence, told the legislature the following:

We, as a Government, despite the serious allegations or statements made by the Hon. Mover, wish to submit this matter to an inquiry to establish the truth, if any, because we are not small men...if we will find that there is no truth, it is he who is going to lose. Now it does not mean that Government accepts these allegations, because these have got to be established.

On the day following the debate Onama placed Amin on a short leave of absence. Minister of Internal Affairs Basil Bataringaya appointed a commission to investigate the accusations. When Obote returned to Kampala on 15 February, he was unable to dissuade his ministers from proceeding with an investigation. The cabinet attempted to convene on 22 February to appoint a new commission of inquiry into the matter, but Obote swiftly placed five members under arrest; Ibingira, Emmanuel Lumu, Balaki K. Kirya, Mathias Ngobi, and George Magezi were detained. The latter four had all been parties to Ibingira's wing in the cabinet, and all had attended the 4 February meeting. Though the threat posed by Ibingira to his leadership was eliminated, Obote decided to consolidate his position by deprecating his ex-rival's allies, specifically Mutesa. He announced that Mutesa was involved in a military coup plot to overthrow his government, precipitating the Mengo Crisis. On 23 February he moved Opolot to the position of Chief of Defence Staff, and Amin was made Chief of Army and Air Force Staff. Obote also appointed three judges to his own commission to investigate the gold scandal allegations: Sir Clement Nageon de L'Estang (Court of Appeal for East Africa), Cecil Henry Ethelwood Miller (High Court of Kenya), and Augustine Saidi (High Court of Tanzania).

The final report of the Commission of Inquiry was published in August 1971, finding no hard evidence of wrongdoing. Historian Aidan Southall wrote that "it would appear that the unaccountably large sums in Amin's bank account were spent quite legitimately on supplies for the Congolese."
