= Twekobe =

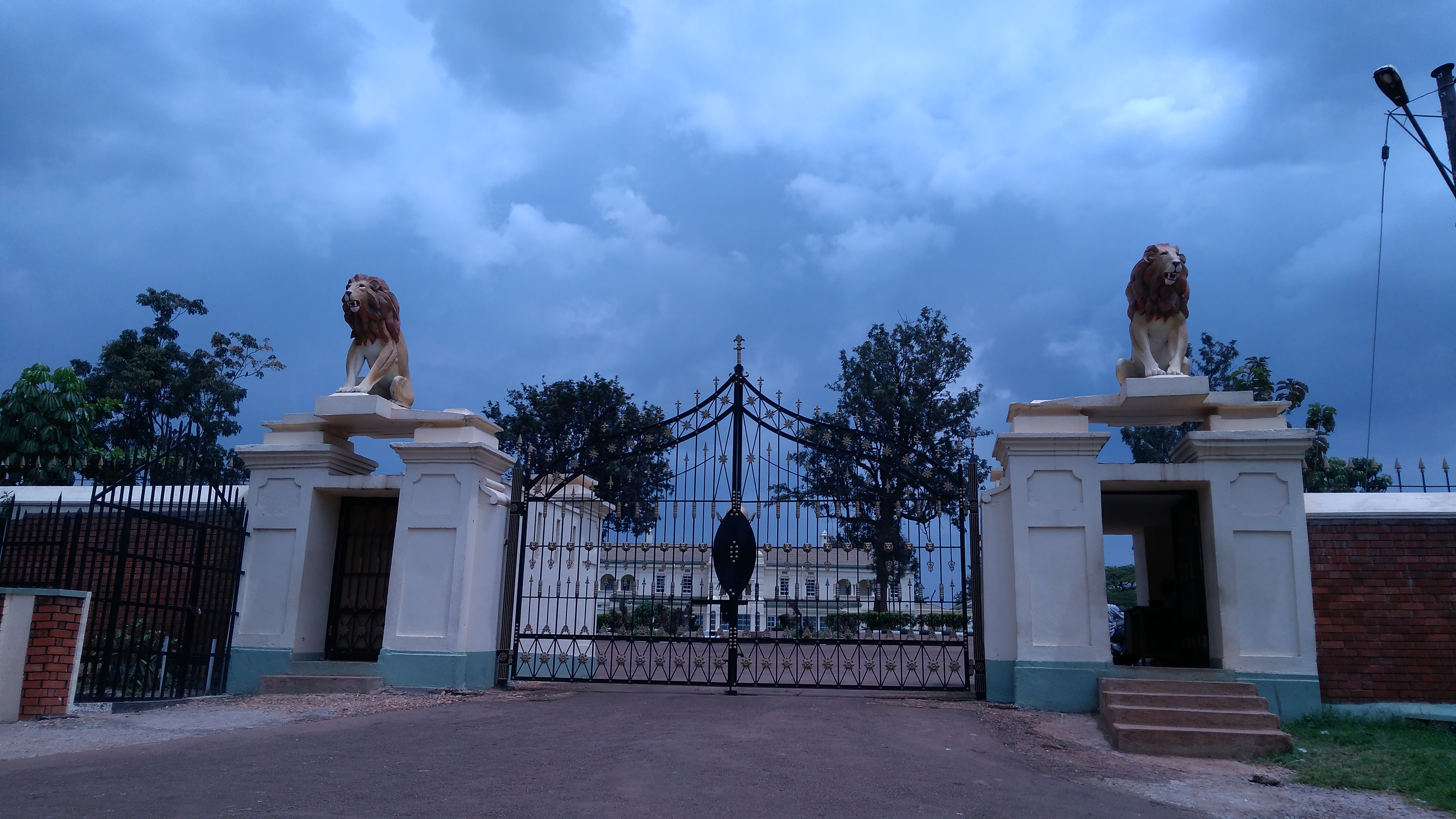
- Twekobe (Kabaka's official residence)
- Interactive map of the Twekobe area

General information
- Location: Inside the Lubiri
- Owner: Kabaka of Buganda

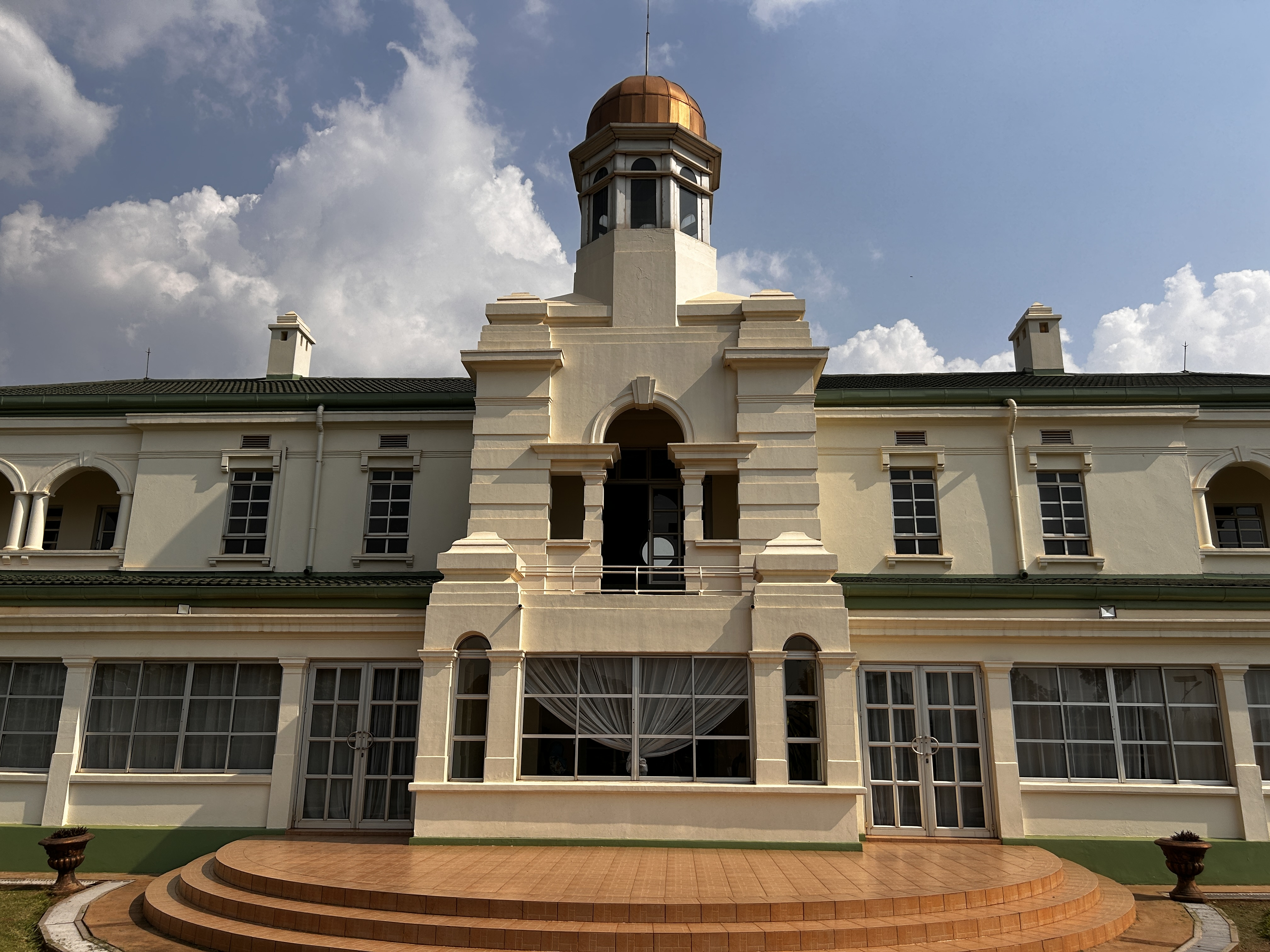
Kabaka's Palace in Kampala

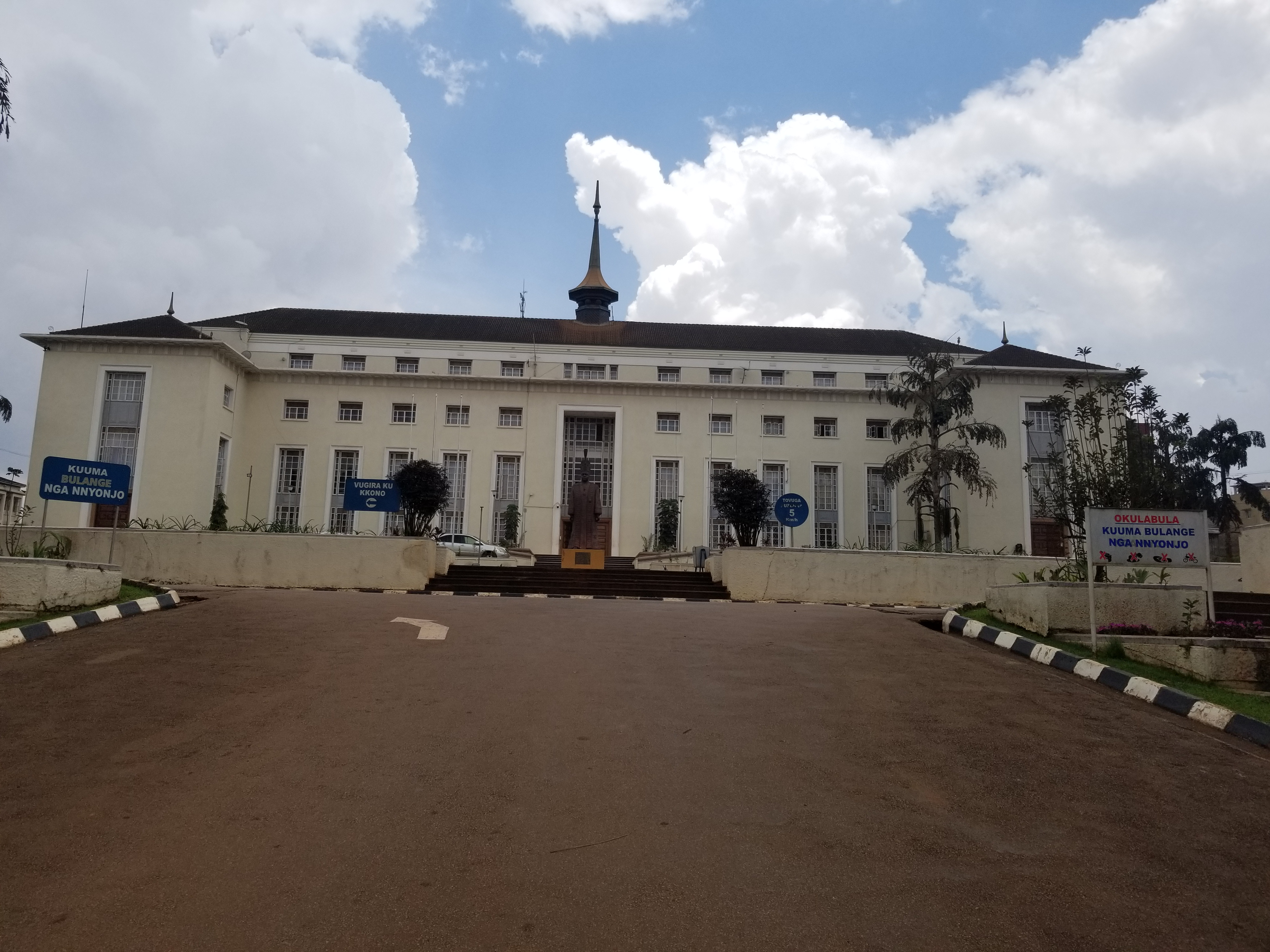
Lubiri Palace

Twekobe also known as the Twekobe Palace, is the official residence of the Kabaka of Buganda. It is located in the Lubiri (Buganda Palace) in n Mengo, Uganda. Its Wiki Loves Monuments ID: UG-C-048.

== Location ==
The royal mile known as Kabaka Anjagala Road stretches straight from Twekobe to the entrance of Bulange.

== History ==
The Kabaka of Buganda is not allowed to occupy this residence if the Katikkiro of Buganda is not in the Butikkiro.

The Nnamulondo (Kabaka throne) is kept in Twekobe.

After the 1996 crisis in Buganda that led to the abolishment of Kingship in Uganda by Milton Obote, the Lubiri was returned to Buganda in 1997 by the central government of Uganda.

In 1999, the Lubiri was renovated to enable host the Kabaka's wedding.

In 2014, Buganda formed a board to oversee the re-development of the palace and its 250 acres of land.

In 2016, Twekobe was renovated including repairs on the roof were made.

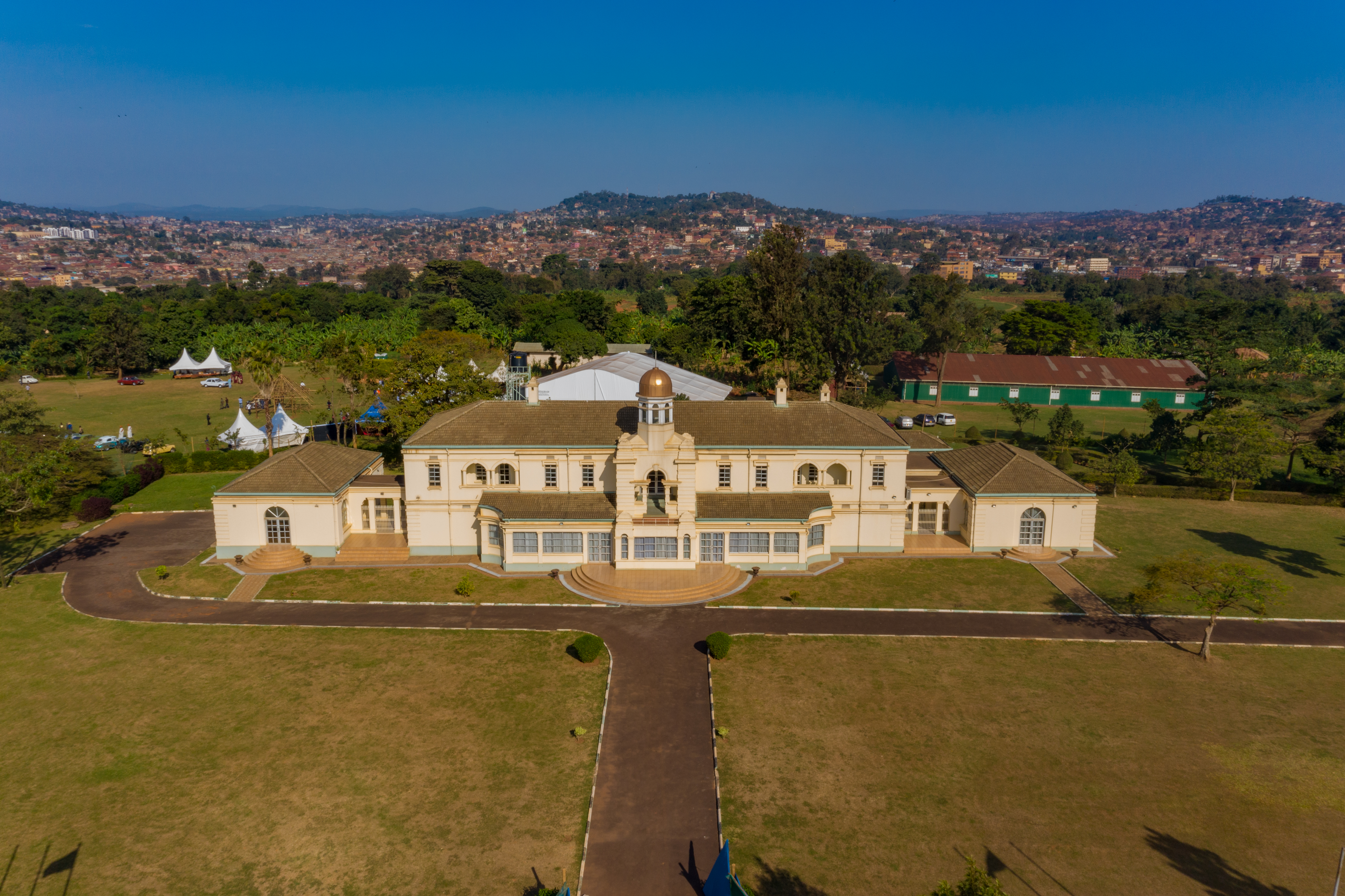
Aerial view of Twekobe (Kabaka's residence)

=== Idi Amin's torture chamber ===
In the 1970s, Twekobe's right wing was built and used by the Israelites and used as an armory but Idi Amin later used it as a torture chamber. And it is believed that 26,000+ people were tortured and killed in that armory that Amin converted into a torture chamber.

== Read also ==
- List of national cultural sites in Central Region, Uganda
- Kabaka of Buganda
- Buganda
- Butikkiro
