= John Wycliffe Lwamafa =

Member of Parliament for Kigezi
- Incumbent
- Assumed office 1962

Member of the Legislative Council
- Incumbent
- Assumed office 1954

Member of the East African Central Legislative Assembly
- Incumbent
- Assumed office 1956

Parliamentary Secretary for Education and Labour
- Incumbent
- Assumed office 1958

Minister of Land and Water Resources
- Incumbent
- Assumed office 1962

Minister of Health

Uganda's Ambassador to the United States
- Incumbent
- Assumed office 29 July 1981

Personal details
- Born: November 1918 (age 107–108) Kigezi, Uganda
- Citizenship: Ugandan
- Party: Uganda People's Congress
- Education: Makerere College
- Occupation: Educator, politician

John Wyclifee Lwamafa (born November 1918), also known as John Rwamafa, was a Ugandan educator and politician who served as a Member of Parliament representing Kigezi after being elected in 1962 on the Uganda People's Congress (UPC) ticket.

== Early life and education background ==
Lwamafa was born in November 1918 in Kigezi, Uganda. He attended Makerere College in Kampala, where he graduated in 1943 with a Diploma in Education.

== Career ==
After graduating from Makerere in 1943, Lwamafa returned to Kigezi and joined Kigezi High School, where he served as a teacher, headmaster from 1951 to 1953 and gamesmaster. While working in education, he became involved in Uganda's pre-independence politics and entered the Legislative Council (LEGCO) as an indirectly elected member in 1954.

In 1956, he served in the East African Central Legislative Assembly. In 1958, he was appointed Parliamentary Secretary in the Ministry of Education and Labour. He contested in the 1961 parliamentary elections but was defeated. In 1962, he won an election as a member of the Uganda People's Congress (UPC).

Following Uganda's independence in 1962, Lwamafa joined Milton Obote's government and was appointed Minister of Land and Water Resources in the independence government. He later served as Minister of Health. On 29 July 1981, he was appointed Uganda's Ambassador to the United States.

== See also ==
- Basil Kiiza Bataringaya
- Grace Ibingira
- Daudi Ochieng
- Felix Onama
