= Butikkiro =

Ugandan royal residence

- Butikkiro
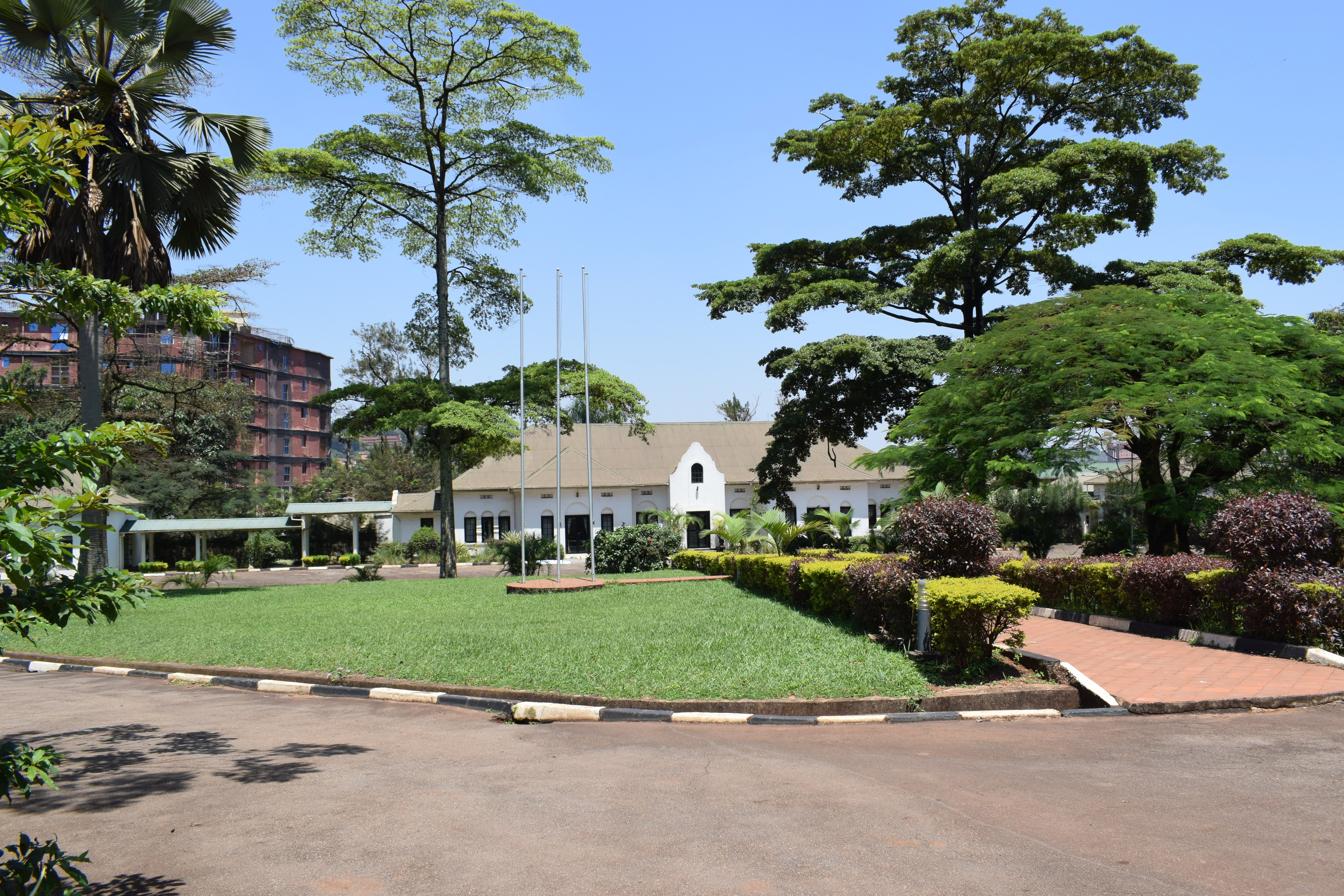
- The Front view of Butikiro House
- Interactive map of the Butikkiro area
- Former names: Butikkiro House
- Alternative names: Katikkiro of Buganda's residence

General information
- Location: Mengo in Kampala, Kampala, Uganda
- Owner: Buganda Kingdom

The Butikkiro is the official residence of the Katikkiro of Buganda in Uganda. The term derives from the official residence itself, where the Katikkiro hosts guests when he is not at his office in the Bulange building. The Butikkiro also serves as the place where the final confirmation of any person appointed to the office of Katikkiro takes place. It is here that the appointee must secure and present the royal mace (Ddamula) after it has been handed over to him. If the designated Katikkiro fails to deliver the Ddamula to the Butikkiro, he cannot assume his role and act on behalf of the Kabaka.

== Location ==
The Butikkiro is located in Kampala, in the Mengo neighbourhood, opposite the Twekobe.

== History and tradition ==
The Kabaka of Buganda is not permitted to reside in the Twekobe if the Katikkiro of Buganda is not present in the Butikkiro.

After the Kabaka hands over the Ddamula (the royal mace) to the newly appointed Katikkiro of Buganda, the Katikkiro pledges allegiance to the Kabaka and promises to carry out the duties assigned to him. The Katikkiro must hold the Ddamula until he reaches the Butikkiro, being protected by members of his clan to prevent anyone from another clan from seizing it before he arrives. Upon reaching the Butikkiro, the Katikkiro is required to express gratitude to his clan members by organising a feast for them.

In 1966, the Butikkiro was among the properties of Buganda seized by the government under Milton Obote when the monarchy was abolished in Uganda.

In 1997, the government led by Yoweri Museveni returned the properties confiscated during Obote's regime, including the Butikkiro. Buganda allowed the government of Uganda to remain tenants of the Butikkiro, as it had been developed into a centre for HIV/AIDS research in Uganda. However, no formal tenancy agreement was established between the government of Uganda and Buganda.

In 2002, the government of Uganda agreed to construct a new Butikkiro since the original building near the Twekobe had been housing the Uganda Joint Clinical Research Center (UJCRC) since August 1993.

In 2003, the Lukiiko held a debate to discuss whether Buganda should lease or sell the Butikkiro to the government of Uganda, which had not paid any fees to Buganda. This was in violation of a 1993 agreement that stipulated the government would pay an annual rent of 48 million Uganda shillings, an arrangement that was never enforced. The 'Bataka' of Buganda (clan heads), led by Frank Kisaale Mbaziira, advised the Kabaka to lease the old Butikkiro for 49 years to the government after inspecting the site and concluding that it was no longer suitable for the Katikkiro's residence and would require significant funds for renovation.

Kabaka Mutebi accepted this advice, as all Buganda cultural rituals performed at the old Butikkiro could be transferred to the new Butikkiro. Additionally, the UJCRC had installed equipment that was difficult to relocate.

Following this recommendation, Kabaka Muwenda Mutebi II of Buganda directed Katikkiro Joseph Ssemwogerere to draft a 49-year lease agreement for the Butikkiro, conveyed through an official letter delivered by Mr William Matovu, the Kabaka's principal private secretary.

A joint committee comprising Buganda and Ugandan government officials was formed to finalise plans for constructing the new Butikkiro. The Buganda team was also tasked with determining the rent arrears owed by the Ugandan government since occupying the Butikkiro in 1993. The government had earlier offered 200 million Uganda shillings to settle the arrears.

The Ugandan government team was initially led by Gilbert Bukenya, who was later replaced by Teckler Kinalwa, the permanent secretary in the Uganda President's Office.

The Buganda team included the late Godfrey Kaaya Kavuma (Deputy Katikkiro and Minister for Lands and Property), J.B. Walusimbi (Minister of Finance, later Katikkiro), J.W. Katende (Attorney General), and Apollo Makubuya (Treasury Minister).

In July 2003, Oweekitiibwa Joseph Mulwanyammuli Ssemwogere, the Katikkiro of Buganda, presented the architectural plan for the new Butikkiro, which was received by Gilbert Bukenya.

In 2005, a new 6-acre site for constructing the new Butikkiro was identified by Buganda Minister Zimbe at Plot 749 on Ring Road, opposite Mengo Palace.

Later in 2005, the Ugandan government paid 450 million Uganda shillings in arrears accumulated for occupying the Butikkiro, Makindye Army Barracks, and the Supreme Court from 1 August 1993 to 2005. The payment was made through a cheque presented to I. Kabanda, Chairman of the Buganda Land Lease Committee. Kabaka Mutebi used 200 million of the 450 million to clear six months’ salary arrears for over 100 Buganda departmental workers.

The Uganda Joint Clinical Research Center was eventually relocated to a new site on Lubowa Hill, at Plot 101 Entebbe Road in Uganda.

== Controversies ==
In 2002, Abazukulu ba Buganda (a group of Baganda activists) claimed that Lukkiko officials had sold the old Butikkiro to the government. These claims were refuted by Godfrey Kaaya Kavuma, who was the Deputy Katikkiro at the time.

In 2003, traditional healers argued that the Butikkiro should not be altered until the Katikkiro occupied it and performed the necessary traditional rituals. They asserted that without these rituals, Ronald Muwenda Mutebi, the Kabaka of Buganda at the time, would not be permitted to occupy the Twekobe Palace.

Some Baganda urged the government of Uganda to use the funds allocated for paying arrears to construct structures for the UJCRC on land offered by the Kabaka, located next to the Lubaga Social Centre. Others suggested that the government should build a new Butikkiro instead of making payments to Buganda.

== Read also ==
- List of national cultural sites in Central Region, Uganda
- Katikkiro of Buganda
- Buganda
- Lukiiko
