= St. Lawrence University (Uganda) =

University in Kampala, Uganda

- Motto: Light Your Candle
- Type: Private
- Established: 2006
- Chancellor: Jessica Alupo
- Vice-Chancellor: Prof. Charles Masaba
- Administrative staff: 100+ (2026)
- Students: 7,500+ (2026)
- Location: Mengo, Kampala, Uganda; 00°18′06″N 32°33′43″E
- Campus: Urban
- Website: slau.ac.ug
- Location within Kampala

St. Lawrence University is a private university in Kampala, Uganda.

== Location ==
The university campus is located in Mengo, Rubaga Division, in Kampala, Uganda's largest city and capital. The university campus sits on 11 acres (4.5 ha) of land and is located near Kabaka's Lake, in Mengo, close to the main Lubiri (Palace of the Kabaka of Buganda), 3 kilometres (1.9 mi) west of the central business district of Kampala. The coordinates of the main campus are 0° 18' 6.00"N, 32° 33' 43.00"E (Latitude:0.301667; Longitude: 32.561945).

== History ==
The university was founded in 2006. The university took in the first class of students in September 2007.

== Academic departments ==
St. Lawrence University is composed of five faculties:

- Faculty of Business Studies
- Faculty of Education
- Faculty of Humanities
- Faculty of Computer Science & Information Technology
- Faculty of Industrial Art & Design

== Courses offered ==
The following courses are offered at the University:

=== Undergraduate degree courses ===
- Bachelor of Information Technology
- Bachelor of Computer Science
- Bachelor of Business Administration
- Bachelor of Arts with education
- Bachelor of Development Studies
- Bachelor of Economics
- Bachelor of Environment Management
- Bachelor of Guidance & Counseling
- Bachelor of Public Administration
- Bachelor of Mass Communication
- Bachelor of Social Work & Social Administration
- Bachelor of Industrial Art and Design
- Bachelor of International Relations and Diplomatic Studies
- Bachelor of Tourism and Hospitality Management

=== Diploma courses ===
- Diploma in Business Administration
- Diploma in Information Technology
- Diploma in Industrial Art and Design

=== Certificate courses ===
- Certificate in Information Technology
- Certificate of Industrial Art and Design

== See also ==
- Education in Uganda
- List of universities in Uganda
- List of Ugandan university leaders
- Universities Offering Business Courses in Uganda
- Lubaga Division
