= Mengo Crisis =

1966 Ugandan political crisis

Coordinates: 0°18′6″N 32°33′58″E

The Buganda Crisis, also called the 1966 Mengo Crisis, the Kabaka Crisis, or the 1966 Crisis, domestically, was a period of political turmoil that occurred in Buganda. It was driven by conflict between Prime Minister Milton Obote and the Kabaka of Buganda, Mutesa II, culminating in a military assault upon the latter's residence that drove him into exile.

== Background ==
=== UPC-KY coalition ===
In 1960, Milton Obote helped to establish a political party in Uganda, known as the Uganda People's Congress (UPC). The UPC aimed to erode the power and influence of the "Mengo Establishment", a group of traditionalist Baganda that led the sub-national kingdom of Buganda. The Mengo establishment was plagued by rivalries and infighting, but most of its members, as Protestant Christians, were united by their dislike of the Democratic Party (DP), which was dominated by Catholics.

The DP won a majority in Uganda's first free national elections in 1961, and formed a government. The UPC and traditionalist Baganda both disliked the Catholic orientation of the DP, but were diametrically opposed to each others' ideals. Despite this, the UPC gave Grace Ibingira, a conservative member of its ranks, the responsibility of making contact with the Baganda to establish an alliance to unseat the DP. The UPC chose him for the role because he was personally acquainted with the Kabaka (King) of Buganda, Mutesa II. After several negotiations, the UPC and Baganda leaders held a conference whereupon an agreement was reached. Soon afterwards the Baganda created the Kabaka Yekka (KY), a traditionalist party that entered an alliance with the UPC.

Following the UPC's victory in the April 1962 general elections, Obote was tasked with forming a government. He became Prime Minister of a UPC-KY coalition government. The KY held mostly insignificant portfolios, while Obote obtained control of the security services and armed forces. Ibingira was made Minister of Justice. Uganda was granted independence from the United Kingdom on 9 October 1962. In 1963 Mutesa was elected President of Uganda, a largely ceremonial post. Obote supported his election with the intention of appeasing the Baganda population.

=== Ibingira's and Obote's rivalry ===
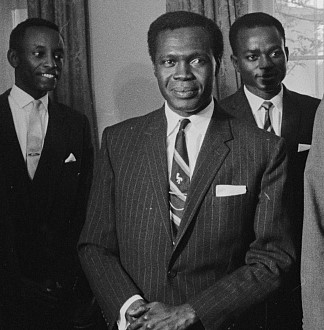
From left to right: Grace Ibingira, leader of the UPC's right wing; Milton Obote, Prime Minister of Uganda; and John Kakonge, leader of the UPC's left wing

In 1964 Ibingira initiated a struggle to gain control of the UPC with the ultimate goal of deposing Obote from the party presidency. At a party conference in April he challenged the left-leaning John Kakonge for the secretariat-general of the UPC. He convinced Obote that Kakonge posed a threat to his leadership of the UPC. With Obote's support, Ibingira ousted Kakonge by two votes. He used his new position to purge the party of a number of leftists. Meanwhile, Mutesa increasingly feared that the UPC would deny his kingdom its traditional autonomy and concluded that in order to retain power he would have to garner influence in national politics. He proceeded to instruct Baganda members of Parliament to join the UPC with the goal of bolstering Ibingira's position and unseating Obote, thus allowing for a reorientation of the UPC-KY alliance that would be more favourable to Buganda. As his working relationship with Mutesa improved, Ibingira amassed a coalition of non-Baganda southerners, dubbed the "Bantu Group". Meanwhile Obote began appealing to DP MPs to defect and join his party in Parliament. He successfully convinced several to do so, including the DP floor leader. On 24 August 1964 Obote, with the UPC having consolidated a majority in Parliament, declared that the coalition with KY was dissolved.

In December 1964 Ibingira, under the cover of checking on his ranch in Ankole, travelled to the United States to raise funds to support anti-socialist causes. Upon his return, he successfully used the money to expand his following. By 1965 it was apparent that the UPC had divided into an Ibingira-led wing and an Obote-led wing. When Ibingira attempted to convene a UPC conference in his capacity as party secretary general, the police shut it down.

=== The lost counties referendum ===
The 1962 constitution granted Buganda a federal autonomy, but it did not provide a resolution to a territorial dispute surrounding the counties of Buyaga and Bugangaizi. The two regions had been annexed by Buganda from the Kingdom of Bunyoro around the turn of the 20th century with the United Kingdom's consent. Bunyoro had demanded the return of the "lost counties" before independence, but this did not occur. On 25 August 1964, Obote submitted a bill in Parliament that called for the matter to be settled through a referendum. Mutesa and Obote held opposing stances on the issue; the former wished for the territories to remain with Buganda, while the latter wanted them to be returned to Bunyoro. In an attempt to sway the vote, Mutesa arranged for large numbers of his subjects to settle in the counties. Obote foiled his plan by decreeing that only persons registered in the area for the 1962 elections could participate in the referendum. Mutesa then vainly attempted to bribe the electorate. The referendum was held on 4 November 1964, and the voters chose by a wide margin to return to Bunyoro.

The result of the vote bolstered Obote's support in Bunyoro and created outrage in Buganda. Baganda rioted and attacked ministers of their kingdom's government. On 9 November Michael Kintu, the Kattikiro (Prime Minister) of Buganda, resigned and was replaced by Jehoash Mayanja Nkangi. When Obote presented the necessary documents officiating the transfer of jurisdiction for Mutesa to sign as President, the latter refused, declaring, "I can never give away Buganda land." Obote signed in his place, but relations between the two men were strained by the ordeal. The transfer took effect on 1 January 1965.

=== Gold Scandal ===
In late 1964 the Ugandan government offered covert aid to Christophe Gbenye, who was leading a rebellion in the eastern portion of the Democratic Republic of the Congo, which shared a border with Uganda. This included direct military assistance from the Uganda Army. Obote had most of this effort executed by Colonel Idi Amin without the knowledge of other military leaders. There was division in the Ugandan cabinet on the policy taken towards the rebels, as it strained relations with the Congolese government and with the United States. On 16 March 1965 KY MP Daudi Ochieng lodged an accusation in Parliament that Amin, Obote, Minister of Internal Affairs Felix Onama, and Minister of Planning and Community Development Adoko Nekyon, had illegally profited off of gold, ivory, and cash originating from the Congo. According to Ochieng, in February 1965 Amin opened an account with the Ottoman Bank. Within 24 days, Sh.340,000 (£17,000 sterling, equivalent to £287,812 in 2025) was deposited in the account. The government promised to investigate the matter. By September, no action had been taken, and in a closed session of Parliament Ochieng introduced a motion that would urge the government to act on the accusations. Obote assured the legislature that progress was being made in the investigation and Ochieng withdrew his motion.

In January 1966 Ochieng, frustrated by the wait in the publishing of a report on the investigation, decided to reintroduce his motion urging the government to take action. On 31 January Obote met with the UPC parliamentary group in secret to explain the delays. The group decided that the matter involved sensitive information pertaining to national security, so all UPC MPs would reject Ochieng's motion to avoid an open debate in Parliament on the investigation's findings. Obote then left the capital, Kampala, to go on a tour of northern Uganda. Shortly before the session of Parliament on 4 February was convened, the cabinet hurriedly met without him. Only half of the ministers attended, and most of those present were sympathetic to Ibingira. The decision was then made that all UPC MPs should support the resolution. According to lawyer and intelligence officer Akena Adoko, the meeting and decision was taken at Ibingira's initiative on advice from Mutesa, who reportedly told him, "Let us join forces right now. Obote and ministers loyal to him are all out, you are the Cabinet boss, let Cabinet meet now and reverse the decision not to support my motion. This has given me much pains. You and I can do wonders working together." Ochieng's motion was soon thereafter tabled in Parliament and debated by its members. It read as follows:

That this House do urge Government to suspend from duty Col Idi Amin of the Uganda Army forthwith pending conclusion of police investigations into the allegations regarding his bank account which should then be passed on to the appropriate public authority whose final decision on the matter shall be made public.

During the speech in which he presented the motion, Ochieng also accused Obote, Onama, and Minister of Planning and Community Development Adoko Nekyon of being complicit in Amin's alleged activities. During the intense debate that followed, Foreign Minister Sam Odaka, referencing previous dubious corruption allegations made by Ochieng, accused Ochieng of abusing his parliamentary immunity to attack the standing of government ministers and failing to reinforce his claims with adequate evidence. Parliament passed the resolution with a single dissenting vote from Kakonge. Kakonge stated that the sudden reversal of the UPC parliamentary group's decision by the cabinet was unusual and must have been the product of a careful strategy. The rest of the UPC MPs had been informed of the cabinet's decision to accept the motion only when the debate opened—unaware that many ministers had not participated in the discussion—and followed the direction of their government.

On the day following the debate, Onama placed Amin on a short leave of absence. Minister of Internal Affairs Basil Bataringaya appointed a commission to investigate the accusations. When Obote returned to Kampala on 15 February, he was unable to dissuade his ministers from proceeding with an investigation. On 22 February, Obote had five ministers of his government placed under arrest during a cabinet meeting; Ibingira, Emmanuel Lumu, Balaki K. Kirya, Mathias Ngobi, and George Magezi were detained by men of the Special Forces—responsible for the security of government officials—and taken to separate locations. Historian A.B.K. Kasozi states that the meeting was organized by the cabinet in an attempt to appoint a new commission of inquiry into the gold scandal. According to Lumu and historian P. G. Okoth, the meeting was called by Obote. The arrested ministers had all been parties to Ibingira's wing in the cabinet, and all had attended the 4 February meeting. (Note: In a 2012 interview, Lumu stated that he had plotted with the ministers and several others to oust Obote, but that one of the conspirators had secretly recorded their conversations and tipped off Obote.) Upon hearing about the arrests, Vice President William Nadiope fled to Kenya and remained there for three weeks. (Note: According to one account, Obote had confronted Nadiope at his home in January 1966 and accused the vice president of plotting against him.) Though the threat posed by Ibingira to his leadership was eliminated, Obote decided to consolidate his position by deprecating his ex-rival's allies, specifically Mutesa. He announced that Mutesa was involved in a military coup plot to overthrow his government. On 23 February he moved Opolot to the position of Chief of Defence Staff, and Amin was made Chief of Army and Air Force Staff. Officers loyal to Opolot were moved to more marginal positions while those with connections to Obote were transferred to more politically advantageous positions. Obote also appointed three judges to his own commission to investigate the gold scandal allegations.

== The "Obote Revolution" ==
On 24 February 1966, Obote announced the suspension of Mutesa from his duties as president, citing his reaction to the lost counties referendum, his ordering of troop movements without ministerial consultation, and his seeking of foreign military support. Mutesa later admitted to having "sounded out" the British high commissioner and several African ambassadors for military assistance. Mutesa also appealed to United Nations Secretary-General U Thant to intervene. On 4 March, Obote declared he would assume the powers of the presidency. On 15 April, he proposed a new national constitution.

The Lukiiko passed a resolution on 20 May demanding that Uganda's national government leave Buganda within the next ten days owing to its lack of compliance with the original constitution. Mutesa later wrote of the resolution, "We did not for a moment expect them to leave. The purpose was to bring a case against them for remaining, for we felt that if we could get the matter into court we were certain to win our case. Obote chose to see it as an ultimatum." Obote's government viewed the resolution as an act of rebellion. When an army unit was dispatched to the Lubiri Palace to investigate an alleged weapons stockpile, Mutesa shot at the soldiers. On 22 May, Obote convened a meeting at the presidential lodge in Kampala which included the Minister of Defence, the Minister of Interior, and the Inspector General of Police. After discussion of the crisis, Obote declared that situation necessitated military involvement. Following the meeting, Obote telephoned Amin and requested that he report to the lodge. Once Amin arrived, Obote instructed him to launch an attack on Mutesa's palace the following day.

== Battle of Mengo Hill ==
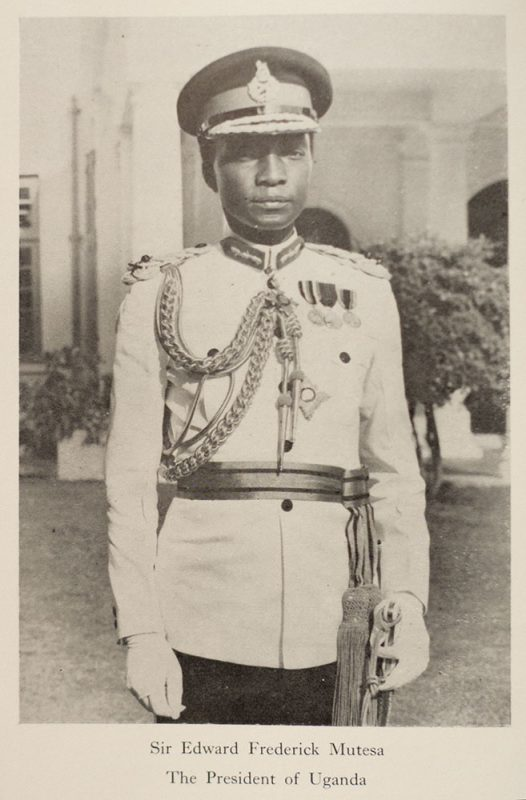
Mutesa II, Kabaka of Buganda

On 23 May, the Uganda Army cordoned off the Lubiri Palace and arrested three Buganda chiefs who had strongly supported the Lukiko's 20 May resolution. Many Baganda began rebelling against the central government. Early the following morning, the army attacked the Luburi Palace under Amin's direct command. As the soldiers attacked they machine-gunned a group of elderly volunteers who slept outside the palace, alerting the royal guards. The palace was defended by 120–160 guards armed with Lee–Enfield rifles, three carbines, six Sterling machine guns and six automatic rifles. The army's attack was slowed by rain. Concluding that they could not win, the guards decided to help Mutesa flee. The king and 20 guards escaped by scaling a palace wall, though Mutesa injured his back in the process.

Upon getting out of the palace, Mutesa hailed a passing taxi cab. The driver took him to the Rubaga Cathedral, where the priests (among them Emmanuel Wamala and Emmanuel Nsubuga) were having breakfast. After he explained what had happened, they gave him clerical robes and arranged for a driver to take him to Busiro County.

At the palace, the remaining guards continued to offer heavy resistance for hours, and the Uganda Army only secured the complex by 2 pm. The government troops murdered several people who tried to surrender, and brutalized prisoners. Excited soldiers also killed "unarmed passerby [...] without reason". The king's brother, Prince Alexander David Ssimbwa was captured at the palace and tortured by the Uganda Army. The troops plundered and demolished the entire palace; a Makerere University historian reportedly saw drunken soldiers carry off the ancient Bugandan royal regalia. Volunteers carried over 200 bodies of fallen Baganda to the morgue, while the military buried uncounted numbers in mass graves. The overall number of dead was unclear. Some estimates claimed that up to 1,000 people had died during the fighting at the palace.

President Julius Nyerere of neighbouring Tanzania, who supported Obote and disliked Mutesa, stationed a large force at the border to prevent the Baganda from regrouping there and launching a counter-attack. Amin personally delivered the Kabaka's persidential flag and military uniform as "trophies of the battle" to Obote's office. Obote went before Parliament and declared "There is nothing to regret. The oneness of Uganda must be assured." While the army completely secured Kampala, unrest spread throughout the rest of Buganda. The central government issued an emergency decree and dispatched the army throughout the kingdom to restore order. Violence subsided over the following days.

== Aftermath ==
Within a few days, the Kabaka and two of his bodyguards were able to cross the border to Burundi and exile. After brief stays in Nairobi and Addis Ababa he was given asylum in the United Kingdom where he stayed until his death, under mysterious circumstances, in 1969. Various Baganda chiefs, members of the royal family and others thought loyal to the Kabaka, were imprisoned. The Lubiri Palace was almost completely destroyed in the course of the fighting and the looting which followed. Historic artifacts and royal regalia were stolen and destroyed, including the Mujaguzo drums. This desecration caused immense psychological suffering for many Baganda who regarded the event as an apocalypse.

The Mengo crisis led to lawsuits being brought against Obote's government. Members of the Mengo establishment that were jailed by the new regime sued for their release. Sir Egbert Udo Udoma, Chief Justice of the Supreme Court, granted it to them in his decision for Uganda v Commissioner of Prisons, Ex Parte Matovu. When the Bugandan government petitioned the court to declare Obote's actions invalid, Udoma ruled that Obote had orchestrated a coup which, according to international law, was a legitimate means of assuming power. He thus declared that Obote's government was legal and that the new constitution was in force. The former cabinet ministers that had been arrested were transferred to Karamoja as per a colonial law, the Deportation Ordinance, that allowed for the detention and removal of "undesirable" persons. They subsequently petitioned the courts for a writ of habeas corpus. In Grace Ibingira & Others v Uganda, a Uganda High Court judge found the detention legal and denied the petition, but the East African Court of Appeal ruled that the ordinance violated a Ugandan citizen's constitutional right to freedom of movement and ordered a writ of habeas corpus to be granted. The ministers were released and then immediately rearrested outside the courthouse in Buganda under the colonial Emergency Regulations, and the government passed the Deportation Act to cover its actions. The ministers filed a new suit, but in a hearing the court affirmed the legality of the new law. The cabinet ministers remained incarcerated until Amin released them following his seizure of power in 1971.

Following the crisis, Obote moved to increase his power by growing his appeal in the military through patronage, particularly through increased defence expenditure in the 1966 budget. Soldiers who had served loyally during the crisis were rewarded for their fidelity. In 1967 he introduced a third constitution which abolished all of Uganda's traditional kingdoms. For his role in the Mengo Crisis, Obote also continued to promote and favour Amin until their eventual falling-out.

Bugandan royalists sought to mobilize an underground resistance against Obote's government. Activists such as "General Muzinge", Obadiah Tamusange, and Kasane Mulindwa spread inflammatory pamphlets, organized demonstrations, and sought to mobilize common people against the government. Most activists remained completely anonymous, adopting a collective persona dubbed the "Secret Council" which remained in use for years. Obote's security forces launched operations against Buganda activists, with Amin focusing on dismantling networks such as the "Secret Council" and "Buganda Liberation Army". These efforts failed to fully suppress dissident groups. In December 1969, Obote was nearly killed in an assassination attempt at a political rally; police identified a Bugandan underground cell as being responsible.

Kabaka Mutesa II died in exile in 1969, but was allowed to be buried in Buganda by Idi Amin after the latter's seizure of power in 1971. After becoming president, Amin initially tried to appease Bugandan royalists, but quickly turned against them upon perceiving their continued loyalty to the abolished monarchy as a threat. Amin promoted the narrative of a Muslim boy from the poor outskirts of the country taking on the Christian leader of Uganda's dominant tribe. The mystique of this action granted him greater legitimacy at least in some sub-populations.

== Legacy ==
Many Baganda collectively hold Obote responsible for the 1966 Crisis. They also blame him for the disestablishment of the Buganda Kingdom and Mutesa's flight into exile. The Lubiri Palace was restored in 1993.

Historian Frank Schubert posited that Obote's takeover marked a key point in Ugandan history, saying, "It had become very clear that the military had become a central institution for solving internal political problems - and that political leaders like Obote would not shy away from using military force at whatever cost."
