= Shaban Opolot =

Ugandan military officer (d. 2005)

Uganda Army Chief of Staff
- In office 1964 – 23 February 1966
- President: Mutesa II of Buganda
- Succeeded by: Idi Amin

Chief of Defence Staff
- In office 23 February 1966 – ?

High Commissioner to Ghana
- In office 1973–1975
- President: Idi Amin

Personal details
- Born: Shaban Opolot Namusi Nakaloke, Uganda Protectorate
- Died: March 2005 (age 86) Mbale District, Uganda

Military service
- Allegiance: British Empire; Uganda
- Branch/service: King's African Rifles; Uganda Army (UA)
- Years of service: 1944–1960s
- Rank: Brigadier

Shaban Opolot (died March 2005) was an Ugandan military officer. He served as commander of the Uganda Army from 1964 to 1966.

== Early life ==
Shaban Opolot was born in Namusi, a village in Nakaloke, Uganda. He could speak multiple languages, including Luganda. He was a Muslim of Teso ethnicity.

== Military career ==
Opolot joined the King's African Rifles (KAR) in 1944 (Note: According to journalist Joshua Kato, Opolot joined the KAR in 1945.) and was sent to Jinja for training. After graduating, he joined the 7th Battalion KAR in Nairobi and later deployed to Mauritius. In 1949, he was promoted to warrant officer and was later sent to England for further training. On 15 July 1961, he was commissioned as a lieutenant. (Note: The London Gazette is the official record of commissions from the Royal Military Academy Sandhurst. Timothy Parsons gives both August and July and Mark Leopold just August.)

Following a mutiny in 1964, Opolot was appointed Uganda Army commander and chief of staff. Opolot was supportive of Mutesa II of Buganda who served as Ugandan president at the time. In January and February 1966, Opolot ordered troop movements in support of Mutesa during the Mengo Crisis that pitted the president against Prime Minister Milton Obote. The commander's orders proved abortive as the army was mostly loyal to his deputy, Idi Amin, an ally of Obote. On 23 February 1966, Obote made Opolot chief of defence staff, effectively removing him from control of the army. He was later imprisoned by the Obote government. By the end of his military career, he had risen to brigadier.

== Later life ==
Obote was overthrown during the 1971 Ugandan coup d'état. The new Ugandan President, Idi Amin, released Opolot from prison. From 1973 to 1975 Opolot served as Uganda's high commissioner to Ghana. Upon his return to Uganda, he retired to the east of the country. After developing prostate cancer, Opolot died in March 2005 (Note: Sources differ on what date he died and was buried. New Vision gives both the 4 and 6 March for his death, and gives the 6 March for his burial. The magazine of the National Resistance Army writes that he was buried on 7 March.) at the age of 86 in Mbale District. He was buried the next day in Kireka Village, Nakaloke Sub-County, Mbale District.
