= Uganda Army (1962–1971) =

Ugandan national armed forces under Mutesa II and Obote I

- Active: 1962–1971
- Country: Uganda ("Sovereign State" and First Republic)
- Type: Armed forces
- Size: 700 (1962); 1,500 (1963); 4,500 (1965); 9,800 (1968)
- Garrison/HQ: Kampala
- Nickname: UA
- Engagements: Rwenzururu insurgency Simba rebellion Mengo Crisis

Commanders
- Commander-in-Chief: Milton Obote
- Notable commanders: Shaban Opolot; Idi Amin; Suleiman Hussein

The Uganda Army (abbreviated UA), also known as the Uganda Rifles, served as the national armed forces of Uganda during the presidencies of Mutesa II and Milton Obote (known as Obote I). As time went on, the military was gradually expanded and increasingly interfered in Uganda's national politics. It played a prominent role in defeating local insurgencies, suppressing opposition to Obote, and intervened in conflicts in the Congo as well as Sudan. Dissatisfied soldiers overthrew Obote in 1971, resulting in the establishment of the Second Republic of Uganda under the dictatorship of army commander Idi Amin. The Uganda Army was purged, with thousands of suspected pro-Obote troops killed or fleeing the country. The military was consequently split into an army serving under Amin – the Uganda Army (1971–1980) – and exiled rebel factions. The latter helped to overthrow Amin's regime during the Uganda–Tanzania War of 1978–79, and became the core of the Uganda National Liberation Army which would serve as Uganda's national military from 1980 to 1986.

== History ==
=== Origin of the national armed forces ===
Uganda's post-independence military originated as cadres of the King's African Rifles (KAR), a British Colonial Auxiliary Forces regiment which was organized to secure the East Africa Protectorate. The British preferred to draw the KAR's recruits from specific ethnic groups in the region, regarding them as "martial races", which had the effect of intensifying ethnic rivalries. As a result, soldiers from northern Uganda dominated the 4th Battalion of the KAR, which was drawn from Ugandan recruits. Nubians were especially overrepresented, although their numbers dwindled over time. Ugandan KAR troops had served in various conflicts of the British Empire, including World War I, World War II, and the Mau Mau uprising in the neighbouring Kenya Colony. However, the KAR's officer corps was exclusively European, and by the point of Ugandan independence, there was not enough time to train suitable African replacements.

As Uganda approached its independence from the United Kingdom, the KAR's 4th Battalion, then stationed at Jinja, was transformed into the country's first military force, the 1st Battalion of the Uganda Rifles. It numbered just 700 soldiers at this point, but was rapidly expanded by enlisting volunteers. The national military was renamed to "Uganda Army" on 1 August 1962, though it was often still called the "Uganda Rifles". Uganda officially became independent on 9 October 1962. At this point, British officers recommended one of the few native officers, Major Augustine Karugaba, as new army chief to Prime Minister Obote. Instead, Obote dismissed Karugaba, considering him disloyal and preferring less educated, northern officers. He was also forced to leave several British officers in place for the time being, with one of them, J.M.A. Tillet, serving as first head of the Uganda Army.

=== Increasing involvement in internal and foreign conflicts ===
Following independence, Obote's government embarked on a programme of military expansion. At the same time, Obote tried to ensure that the army's enlargement benefitted the northerners, most importantly his own Langi compatriots. Uganda also continued to cooperate with the United Kingdom in military matters, and most of the early Ugandan officers were trained in the United Kingdom, while equipment was also of British origin. The UA soon began operations against local tribal resistance and banditry, particularly targeting the Karamojong people. In January 1963, Tanganyikan President Julius Nyerere proposed to combine his country's military with the Uganda Army to improve the strength of both countries. Even though Obote initially considered the idea, it was strongly opposed by a British UA commander, W.W. Cheyne. The latter argued that the Tanganyikan military was inferior, and that the morale of his soldiers would suffer if they were forced to work with the Tanganyikans. Obote was convinced by his arguments, and rejected the proposal. Researcher Timothy Parsons stated that Cheyne's claims were based on bias instead of facts, and that the Uganda Army was actually the "least stable" ex-KAR formation in East Africa. By July 1963, the army had grown to 1,500 personnel. Considering various security threats, posed by local militant resistance groups such as the Rwenzururu movement, and potential threats from the Congo and Sudan, the country's military was further expanded through the establishment of a 2nd Battalion. By this point, Uganda also enlisted Israeli help in training and arming its forces. On 27 December 1963, an army company killed and captured some Rwandan rebels at Kizinga after they had been repulsed by Rwandan forces over the border.

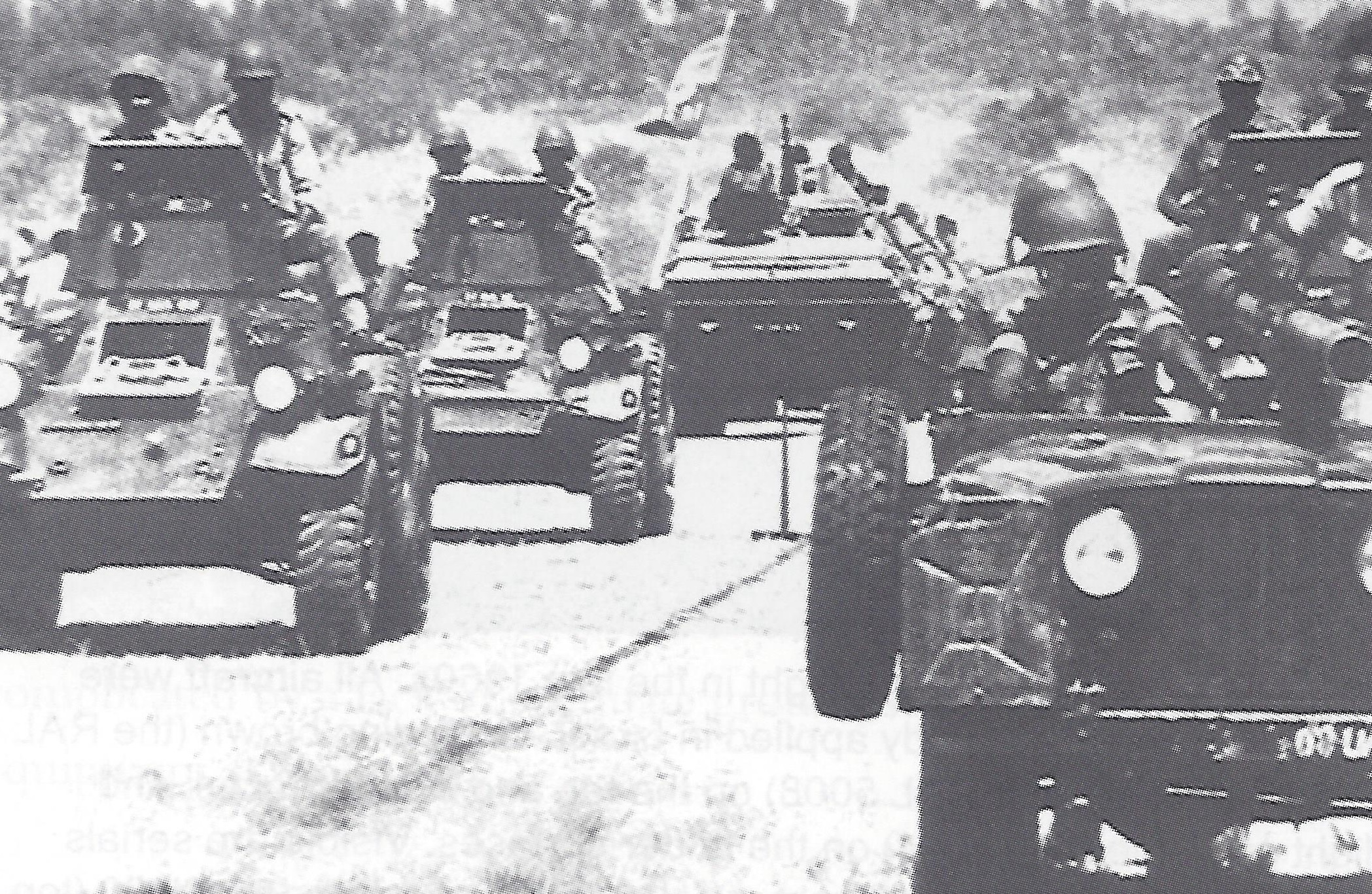
Uganda Army OT-64 SKOT APCs, Ferret armoured cars, and jeeps in the late 1960s

On 23 January 1964, the 1st Battalion mutinied following similar mutinies in Kenya and Tanzania. The soldiers were upset about the conditions of their service, and the slow progress of Africanisation in the officer corps. When Minister for Defence Felix Onama met with the mutineers to discuss their demands, they manhandled him and locked him up until he agreed to support their demands in the cabinet. The Ugandan government was only able to put down the mutineers with British assistance in the form of the Scots Guards and Staffordshire Regiment. Regardless, the government agreed to meet the soldiers' demands, including an increase in pay as well as the Africanisation of the officer corps. As a result of the latter agreement, Idi Amin was appointed commander of the 1st Battalion, while Shaban Opolot was made Army Commander. The mutiny also strongly impacted national politics, as Obote's government increasingly viewed the military as a potential threat as well as asset. In April 1964, the General Service Unit (GSU) was set up as a militarised intelligence agency and bodyguards to protect the government from civilian and military threats. The GSU was almost entirely composed of Langi. In addition, Obote decided to not only africanize the officer corps, but also reduce cooperation with the British military in general so that the latter had less leverage in Uganda. In late July 1964, the British Army completely withdrew from the country, while cooperation with Israel was increased to set up armoured forces well as an air force for the Uganda Army. The de facto success of the mutinies also proved very harmful to the UA soldiers' future discipline.

While these internal developments affected the military, Uganda was drawn into the Simba rebellion of the Congo. Prime Minister Obote's government supported the Simba rebels, and Uganda Army soldiers occasionally fought alongside the Congolese insurgents against the Congo's Armée Nationale Congolaise (ANC). Uganda Army troops also provided weaponry in exchange for gold to the rebels. Border clashes between the Uganda and Congo took place in 1964, and the Congolese launched air attacks on two Ugandan villages. Obote responded by further expanding in Uganda Army, as the 3rd Battalion was set up in February and the 4th Battalion in March 1965. There were also reports about Ugandan troops crossing the border in a raid targeting Mahagi and Bunia in retaliation for the Congolese air attacks. Around 15 March 1965, Uganda Army soldiers attacked ANC forces led by Mike Hoare which were in the process of retaking Mahagi from Simba rebels during Operation White Giant.

By July 1965, the Uganda Army counted 4,500 troops and organized its 1st Brigade. In 1966, political tensions between Prime Minister Obote and President Mutesa II of Buganda led to the Mengo Crisis, culminating in Obote deposing Mutesa in a violent coup. Uganda Army troops under Amin assaulted Mutesa's palace, overpowering and killing his guards, resulting in his flight into exile. Obote consequently assumed the presidency, and increased the military budget, acquiring more heavy equipment and deepening military ties with the Eastern Bloc. He rewarded soldiers who remained loyal to him during the crisis, and used the expanded budget to disburse patronage to increase his following in the army. At this point, the army had established itself in "an indispensable position" in Uganda's politics.

=== The Obote-Amin rivalry ===
The military continued to grow in the following years: The Military Police, the Paratrooper Battalion, the Border Guard Unit, the 5th Mechanised Regiment, and the 2nd Brigade were organized, and the entire Uganda Army consisted of about 9,800 soldiers by 1968, of which only 200 were officers. Northerners remained dominant at about 61%, whereas 22% were from the eastern and 12% from the western parts of Uganda. Indiscipline worsened in the military, and drunken Uganda Army troops became notorious for abusing Makerere University students who had grown increasingly anti-military as well as anti-Obote. Unrest and infighting also significantly worsened among the military, as Obote and Amin had become rivals and attempted to dominate the Uganda Army by recruiting partisans supportive of their political factions. Although these factions did not completely correspond to ethnicities, Amin found most of his support among troops from the West Nile Region and migrants from Sudan as well as Zaire, whereas Obote was mainly aided by Acholi and Langi soldiers. This development resulted in growing ethnic tensions within the army. Although Obote initially succeeded in maintaining control of the military by placing important positions in the hands of Langi, his policies alienated members of other ethnicities. The West Nile troops felt especially underprivileged, and even the Acholi soldiers felt that the President was unduly favoring Langi in regard to promotions. In January 1970, someone attempted to murder Obote, while UA deputy commander Pierino Yere Okoya, a rival of Amin, was assassinated. It was suspected that Amin had plotted both the unsuccessful attack on Obote as well as Okoya's murder. The UA commander fuelled these suspicions by temporarily fleeing from Kampala after being informed that Obote had survived the assassination attempt.

Obote's government appointed Suleiman Hussein as new Uganda Army Chief of Staff on 29 September 1970, relegating Amin to head of a military training center. Although Hussein was an ethnic Alur and thereby a West Nile tribesman, the West Nile soldiers had begun to associate their fortunes with those of Amin, as the latter had begun to present himself as their champion and protector. Accordingly, Amin's removal led to considerable opposition, which the officer exploited by rallying several anti-Obote factions in the Uganda Army and among the civilian elite to his cause. By January 1971, the tensions had reached a critical point, as Obote had travelled abroad for a meeting in Singapore. At that time, Obote loyalists in the army acted in a way which suggested that they were preparing to arrest Amin. West Nile troops then launched a coup d'état that resulted in Amin's seizure of power in the country. A military dictatorship with Amin as president was consequently established.

=== Coup aftermath and division of the army ===
In the coup's immediate aftermath, several Uganda Army units remained loyal to Obote, but failed to quickly respond to Amin's seizure of power. In a matter of weeks, the pro-coup troops mostly crushed the pro-Obote troops in a series of violent clashes, arrests, and selective purges. In response, many Acholi and Langi soldiers deserted to link up with Obote in exile. When hundreds of deserters were captured at the Sudanese border in April 1971, showcasing just how many troops were disloyal and possibly joining an exile army supportive of Obote, President Amin's government reacted by initiating purges of all suspected dissidents in the military. Instead of selective actions, entire groups of soldiers were massacred. About 5,000 Acholi and Langi soldiers were killed or forcibly disappeared in the next months. Journalist Patrick Keatley estimated that as much as two thirds of the original military personnel were killed within a year. Amin replaced the purged troops by mass recruiting people regarded as loyal to his regime, mostly West Nile tribesmen.

After his loyalists in the Uganda Army had been mostly killed, Obote attempted to organize a guerrilla force to regain power using the troops who had managed to flee Uganda. Obote's rebels were initially provided with bases in Sudan and Tanzania, although the former expelled them in May 1972. The anti-Amin rebels launched an invasion of Uganda in late 1972, but were defeated by the Uganda Army. The Ugandan government consequently intensified purges of internal opponents, including those in the military. These purges alongside mass recruitment of new troops and the patronage system which Amin implemented to keep the army loyal resulted in growing unrest and corruption within the Uganda Army. Elements in the military repeatedly attempted to overthrow the President, while exile factions including Obote's attempted to facilitate coups or rebellions by organizing guerilla attacks and mobilizing discontented soldiers. The Tanzania-based militant group loyal to Obote was eventually named Kikosi Maalum ("Special Force"); most of its members were ex-Uganda Army officers by 1978.

== Organization ==
=== Ethnicity ===
After Uganda's independence, there were three main regional/ethnic groups in the military: The largest number were northerners, mostly Acholi, Langi, Teso, and a minority of West Nile origin; a minority of Bantu, mostly Baganda, who played an important part in the officer corps as they had advantages in education as a result of British colonial politics; and a small number of Nubians. Langi had initially been a very small minority, but their number quickly grew as a result of Obote's influence. After Obote overthrew Mutesa II, he purged the army of most Bantu officers and a significant number of Teso troops. Afterwards, the military was dominated by Langi, Acholi, and West Nile people whose members were eventually drawn into the Obote-Amin rivalry. Obote consequently enlisted an increasing number of Langi. By 1971, most Uganda Army troops were Langi, Acholi, and Teso, while soldiers belonging to West Nile peoples constituted a minority.

=== Structure ===
The Uganda Army consisted of its ground forces and the Uganda Army Air Force.

==== Known units ====
Unit	Alternative name(s)	Base(s)	Commander(s)	History
1st Infantry Battalion (1UA)	1st Uganda Rifles	Jinja	W.W. Cheyne (1962–?); J.B. Hamilton (?–1964); J. Musa (acting, 1964); Idi Amin (from 1964)	established in 1960; mutinied in January 1964; deployed to the Congolese border during the border clashes of the Simba rebellion; fought against Rwenzururu rebels; guarded the Lubiri after the Mengo Crisis in 1966
2nd Infantry Battalion (2UA)	2nd Uganda Rifles	Moroto	Richard Groome (1963–?); Suleiman Hussein (from 1964)	established in 1963
3rd Infantry Battalion (3UA)		Mubende	Pierino Yere Okoya (acting, from 1965)	established in 1965
4th Infantry Battalion (4UA)		Mbarara	Y. Omoya (acting, from 1965)	established in 1965
5th Mechanised Specialist Reconnaissance Regiment	Mechanized Malire Specialist Recce Regiment; Malire Regiment	Camp Malire in Kampala	Mustafa Adrisi	established in 1967
2nd Paratrooper Battalion		Fort Portal		established in 1969
Military Police			Mustafa Adrisi	established in 1967
1st Brigade				established in 1965
2nd Brigade	2nd Infantry Brigade	Masaka	Pierino Yere Okoya (until 1970) (Note: Okoya served as 2nd Brigade commander and deputy commander of the Uganda Army at the same time.)	
Uganda Army Air Force	UAAF; Ugandan Air Force	Entebbe		established in 1964
