= Suleiman Hussein =

Ugandan military officer

Uganda Army Chief of Staff
- In office 29 September 1970 – 29 January 1971
- President: Milton Obote

Personal details
- Died: 29 January 1971 Kampala, Uganda

Military service
- Allegiance: Uganda
- Years of service: ?–1971
- Rank: Brigadier
- Commands: Second Battalion

Suleiman Hussein (died 29 January 1971) was a Ugandan military officer who was the Uganda Army Chief of Staff from 1970 until 1971.

== Early life ==
Hussein originated from West Nile District, Uganda. He was ethnically an Alur of Congolese ancestry. He was a Muslim.

== Military career ==
Following Uganda's independence in 1962, Hussein initially rose to major. In 1964, he became commander of the Uganda Army's Second Battalion with the rank of lieutenant colonel. On 12 April 1968 he was promoted to the rank of brigadier. On 29 September 1970 the Defence Council made him Uganda Army Chief of Staff. Upon assuming this post he issued a statement addressed to the soldiers of the army, cautioning against "tribalism" and the subversive manipulation of ethnic loyalties. In January 1971 President Milton Obote informed a "committee" which included Hussein that he wanted Colonel Idi Amin arrested before he returned from an oversees trip to Singapore. The committee failed to act on this with haste, and some Uganda Army personnel launched a coup, overthrowing Obote and replacing him with Amin. On 29 January the putschists arrested Hussein in Kampala and brought him to Luzira Prison where he was subsequently beaten to death. His head was severed from his body and taken to Amin, who reportedly stored it in a refrigerator overnight.

== Works cited ==
- Kalema, Andrew Ndaula (1995). Uganda, a Century of Existence. Kampala: Fountain Publishers. ISBN 9789970020225.
- Kasozi, A.B.K. (1994). Nakanyike Musisi; James Mukooza Sejjengo (eds.). Social Origins of Violence in Uganda, 1964–1985. Montreal; Quebec: McGill-Queen's University Press. ISBN 978-0-7735-1218-4.
- Kirunda-Kivejinja, A. M. (1995). Uganda: The Crisis of Confidence. Kampala: Progressive Publishing House. OCLC 35822265.
- Kokole, Omari H. (1985). "The 'Nubians' of East Africa: Muslim Club or African "Tribe"? The View From Within" (PDF). Institute of Muslim Minority Affairs Journal. 6 (2): 420–448. doi:10.1080/13602008508715952.
- Omara-Otunnu, Amii (1987). Politics and the Military in Uganda, 1890–1985. London: Palgrave Macmillan. ISBN 978-1-349-18738-6.
- Violations of Human Rights and the Rule of Law in Uganda (PDF). Geneva: International Commission of Jurists. 1974. OCLC 1052819668.
