= Emmanuel Lumu =

Ugandan physician and politician (1916–2019)

- Born: Emmanuel Bijjugo Sajjalyabene Lumu; February 1916; Komamboga, Uganda
- Died: 11 December 2019 (aged 103); Bakuli, Rubaga Division, Kampala, Uganda
- Occupations: Physician politician

Emmanuel Bijjugo Sajjalyabene Lumu (February 1916 – 11 December 2019) was a Ugandan physician and politician.

== Early life ==
Emmanuel Bijjugo Sajjalyabene Lumu was born in February 1916 in Komamboga, Uganda. He was the sixth of ten children of Mikaili Sajjalyabene and Hannah Nalwoga. After receiving his primary education, Lumu enrolled at King's College, Budo in 1933. In 1938, he enrolled at Makerere University. Though he sought to study engineering, Lumu was placed in the medical school. He secretly attended engineering classes before being caught by administrators. Graduating in 1945 with a degree in medicine, he served two years as an intern before being employed at Arua Hospital as an assistant medical officer. He subsequently worked at the hospital in Gulu and then Mulago Hospital in Kampala.

== Political career ==
Lumu served as a delegate at the 1961 Ugandan Constitutional Conference. He was elected to the Parliament of Uganda in 1962 from a seat representing Kyadondo. Shortly before Uganda's independence, the National Assembly elected Lumu to lead the country's health ministry. Lumu suspected his friendship with the Kabaka of Buganda, Mutesa II, contributed to his election.

With Uganda's independence, Lumu became minister of health in Prime Minister Milton Obote's cabinet. He focused on developing a national strategy for expanding health services throughout the country. Relying heavily on technical staff, he promoted a plan to create a network of regional referral hospitals in a 10-year period.

On 25 January 1971, Idi Amin launched a military coup, ousting Obote and seizing power.He released Lumu along with 54 other political prisoners three days later.

== Later life ==
Following his release from prison, Lumu opened a clinic in Mengo Kisenyi, which he operated until 1996. For a time he also ran a garage which restored and repaired old automobiles. Accusations that he unethically acquired property in Kampala and Mukono districts led him to be called to testify before the Land Commission in 2018 in his last public appearance. While his family was planning to celebrate his upcoming 104th birthday, Lumu fell ill with a cough and developed pneumonia, dying on 11 December 2019 at his home in Bakuli, Rubaga Division, Kampala.

== Works cited ==
- Otunnu, Ogenga (2016). Crisis of Legitimacy and Political Violence in Uganda, 1890 to 1979. Springer. ISBN 9783319331560.
