= Lubiri =

Official palace for the Buganda Kingdom

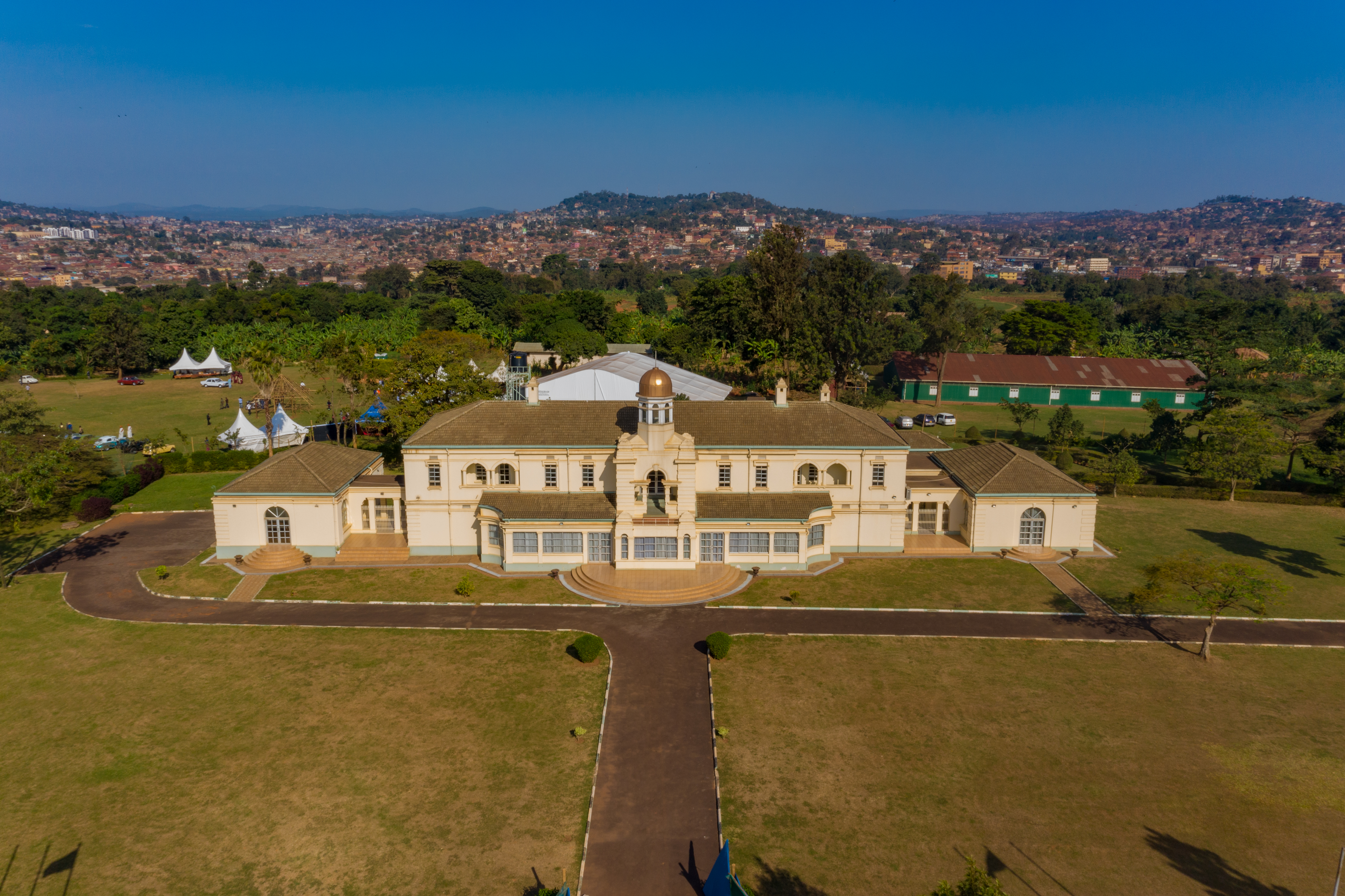
Aerial view of the Kabaka's Palace i.e Twekobe. It is the official residence of the Kabaka (Buganda King) within the palace grounds.

Lubiri, commonly referred to as the Kabaka's Palace, Mengo Palace, or Twekobe (meaning "working together" in Luganda), is the official royal compound of the Kabaka (king) of the Buganda Kingdom in Uganda. Situated on Mengo Hill in the Mengo suburb of Kampala, the sprawling four-square-kilometre site overlooks the city and stands opposite the kingdom's administrative seat, the Bulange.

The palace is connected to the Bulange by Kabaka Anjagala Road, known as the Royal Mile, a ceremonial route historically lined with candlenut trees symbolizing the kingdom's clans.

The original Lubiri was destroyed by the Uganda Army in the May 1966 during the Battle of Mengo Hill, at the culmination of the struggle between Mutesa II and Milton Obote for power. It was renovated in 1999, to enable host the Kabaka's wedding.

List of Buganda Palaces
#	Name	Location
1.	Bulange Palace	Mengo
2.	Twekobe Palace	Lubaga
3.	Banda Palace	Kyaddondo county
4.	Kireka Palace	Kyaddondo county
5.	Nkoni Palace	Buddu county
6	Lukunyu Palace	Buddu county
7	Bamunanika Palace	Bulemeezi County

== History ==
After succeeding his father Kabaka Muteesa I in 1884, Kabaka Mwanga II constructed the Lubiri in 1885 on a hill previously known for the grinding stones (emmengo) of the Nvubu clan used to grind herbal medicine and millet and giving the area its name "Mengo". The palace embodied unity among the kingdom's subjects during its building. It has since served as the primary royal seat for successive Kabakas.

In 1966, during the Buganda Crisis, Ugandan government forces under Milton Obote attacked the palace, forcing Kabaka Edward Mutesa II into exile. The site suffered significant damage and later, under Idi Amin's regime (1971–1979), parts became military barracks, including notorious underground torture chambers.

The monarchy restored in 1993, and the palace returned to the kingdom. Though renovated, the current Kabaka, Ronald Muwenda Mutebi II, rarely resides there due to its violent history, preferring a private residence.

== Description and features ==
The compound features traditional and modern elements, with lush grounds, banana plantations, and several gates:

- Wankaki: The main entrance, reserved primarily for the Kabaka, Queen, and Katikkiro (prime minister).
- Other gates include Kalaala, Nnalongo, and Ssabagabo (or Wansaso).
- A perpetual fire (ekyoto ggombolola), lit twice daily by the Nakisinge clan, symbolises the Kabaka's enduring reign—it extinguishes only upon a Kabaka's death.
- The site includes a collection room with royal photographs, regalia, and artifacts, such as a vintage Rolls-Royce owned by Mutesa II and remnants from the 1966 attack. The Amin-era dungeon, built with five cells, serves as a sombre historical exhibit.
- The main residence, Twekobe, houses the royal throne (namulondo) and remains restricted.

== Significance ==
Lubiri represents the administrative, cultural, and spiritual centre of Buganda, one of Africa's oldest monarchies. It hosts ceremonies and offers guided tours that highlight the kingdom's resilience, governance, and past atrocities.

== Other Royal Palaces and Residences ==
Buganda's Kabakas historically built new palaces, many of which later became royal burial sites (Amasiro). These sites preserve traditional architecture and spiritual importance.

- Kasubi Tombs - Originally the palace of Kabaka Mutesa I, converted into a tomb after his death. Now a UNESCO World Heritage Site, it burials four Kabakas: Mutesa I, Mwanga II, Daudi Chwa II, and Edward Mutesa II. The main structure, Muzibu Azaala Mpanga, features iconic thatched design.

== See also ==
- Mengo Hill
- Namirembe
- Lubaga Division
- Kampala Capital City Authority
