= Mengo, Uganda =

Mengo
- Map of Kampala showing the location of Mengo
- Coordinates: 00°18′06″N 32°33′58″E
- Country: Uganda
- Region: Central Uganda
- District: Kampala Capital City Authority
- Division: Rubaga Division
- Elevation: 1,220 m (4,000 ft)
- Time zone: UTC+3 (EAT)

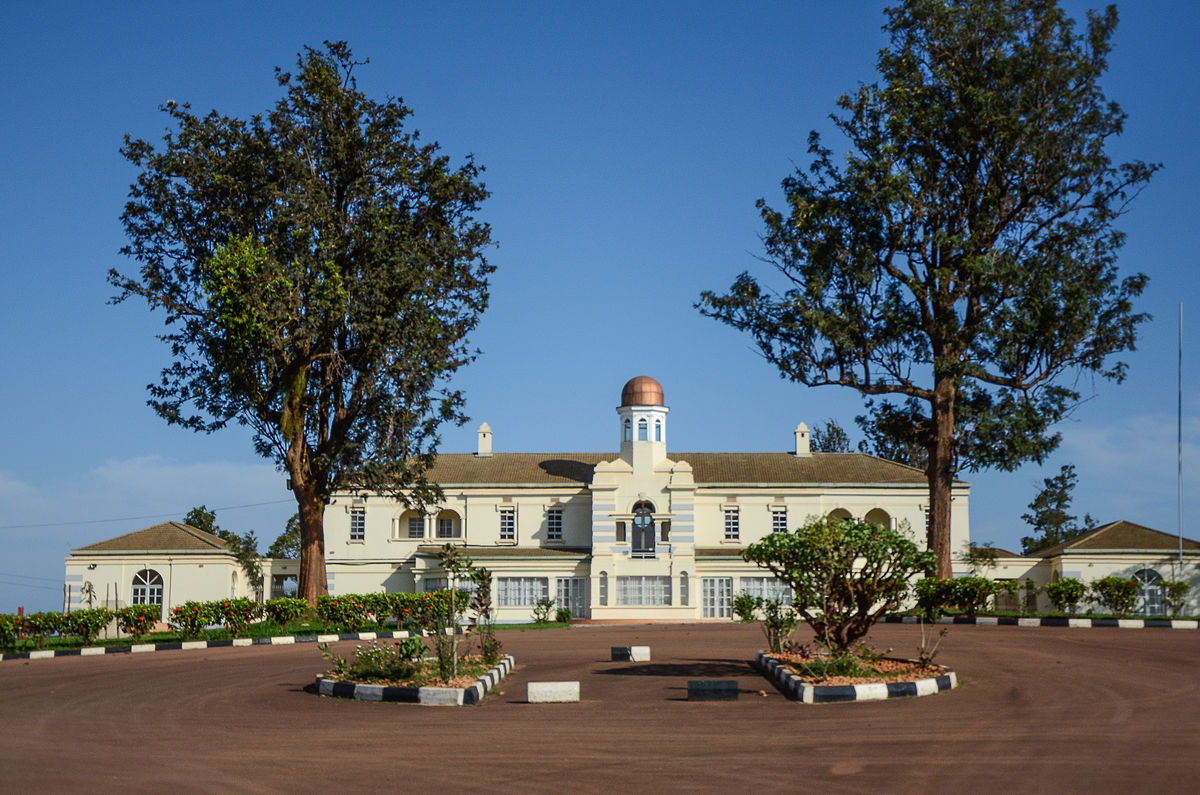
Mengo Palace.

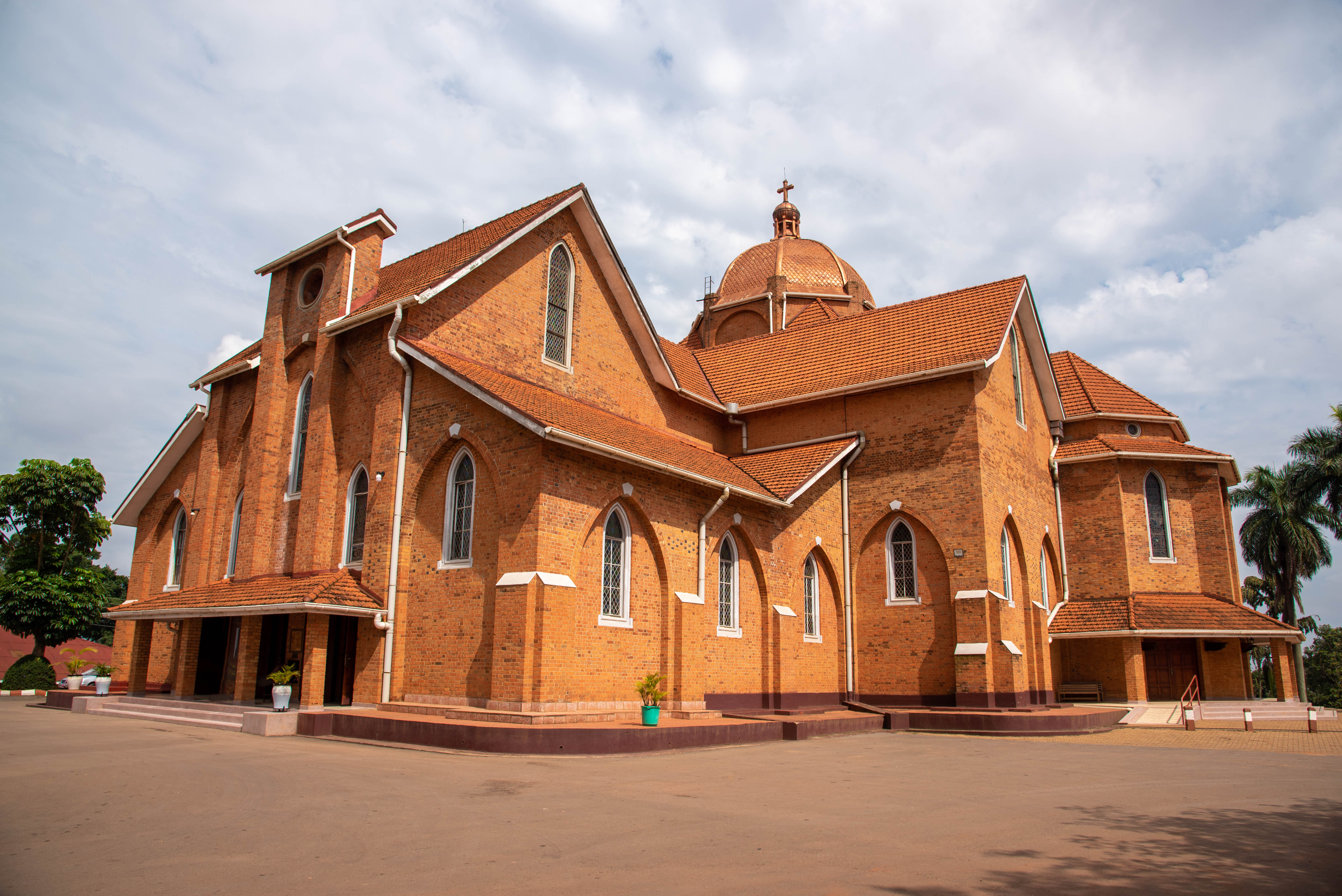
Saint Paul’s Cathedral Namirembe, commonly referred to as Namirembe Cathedral.

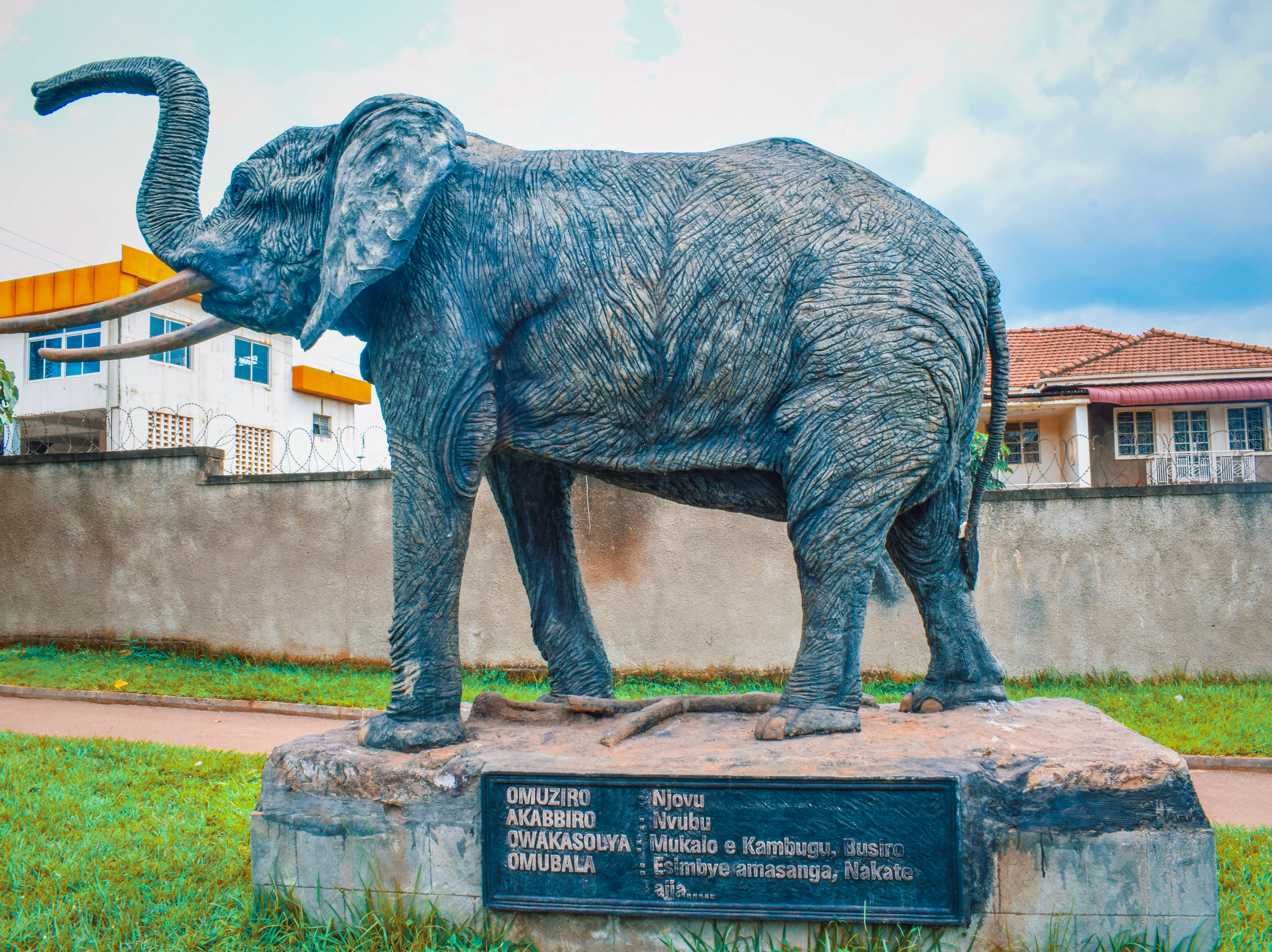
Sculpture representing the Njovu Clan in Buganda

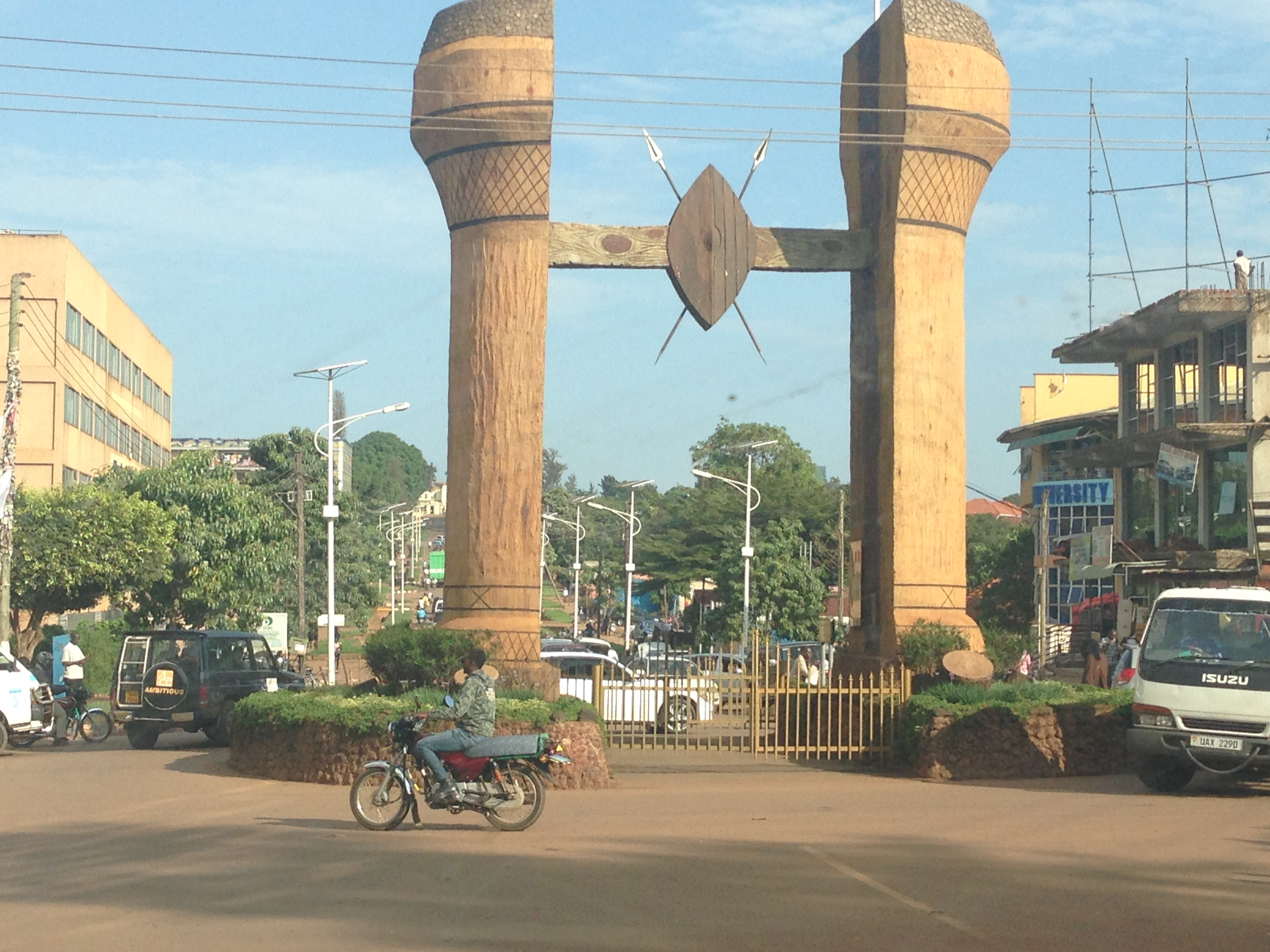
The monument straddles the road that leads to both the kingdom’s seat in Bulange, Mengo, and the Kabaka’s official palace at the Lubiri, Mengo

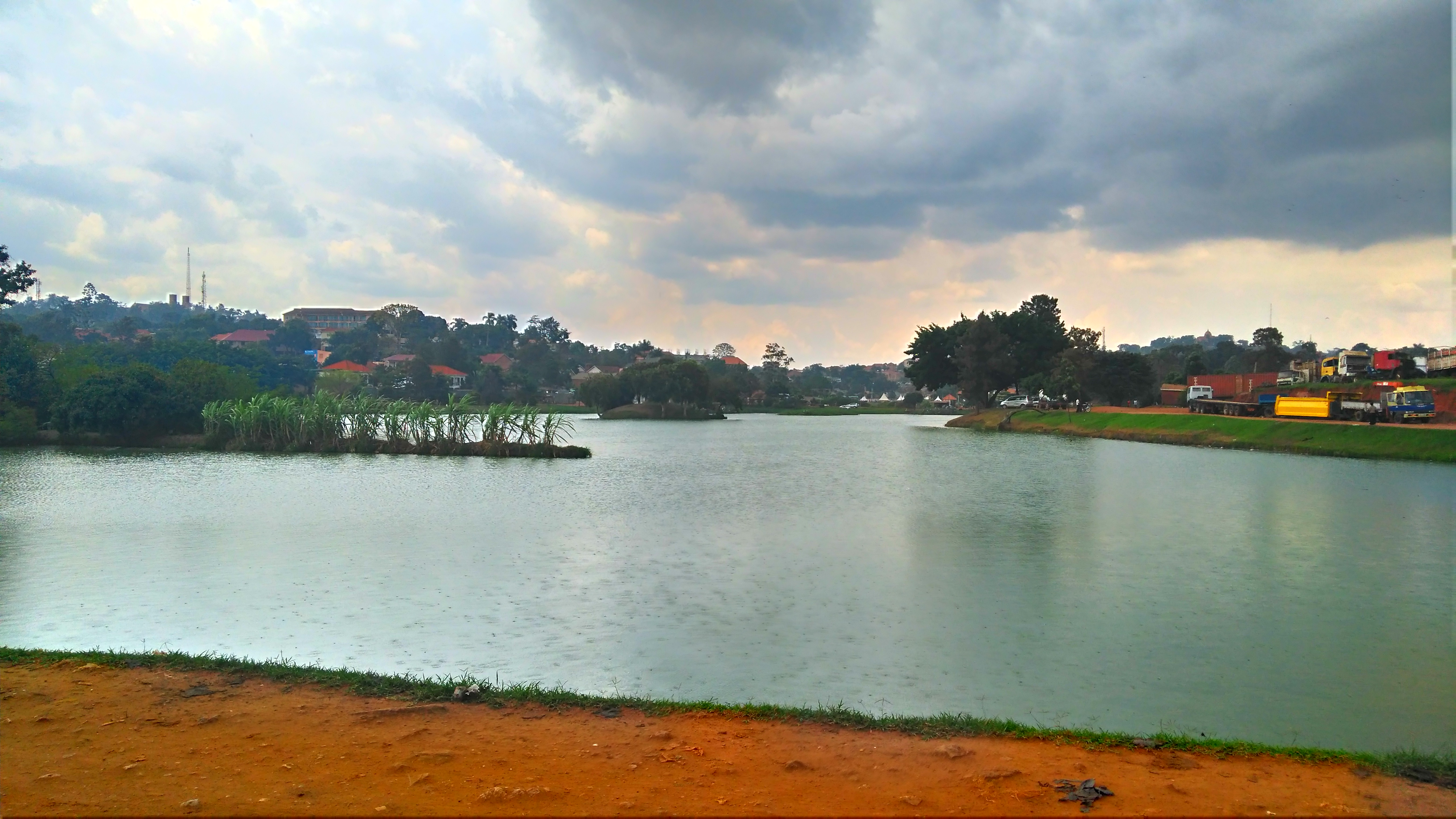
Kabaka's Lake in Mengo, Ndeeba.

Mengo is a hill in Rubaga Division, Kampala, Uganda's capital and largest city. The name also applies to the neighborhood on that hill.

== Location ==
Mengo is bordered by Old Kampala to the north, Nsambya Hill to the east, Kibuye to the south-east, Ndeeba to the south, Lubaga Hill to the west, and Namirembe Hill to the north-west. This location is approximately 2.5 kilometres (1.6 mi), by road, directly south of the central business district of Kampala. The coordinates of Mengo Hill are 0°18'06.0"N, 32°33'58.0"E (Latitude:0.301667; Longitude:32.566111). The peak of the hill is 4000ft above sea level.

== Overview ==
Mengo Hill is the location of the main palace (known as Lubiri or Mengo Palace) of the Kabaka (King) of the Kingdom of Buganda, a monarchy that dates back almost 800 years. Mengo has been the main palace since it was first constructed in 1885 by Mwanga II of Buganda, the 31st Kabaka of Buganda. Measuring 0.9 square miles (2.3 km^{2}), the palace is ringed by a six-foot brick fence and has a small airstrip within its walls.

Mengo Hill has played an important role in Ugandan political and religious history. "Mengo" is a Luganda word for grinding stones. According to legend, ancient migrant communities from the Ssese Islands who settled on the hill used these stones to grind their food. It is here that the Buganda Agreement of 1900 was signed between the Kabaka of Buganda and British colonial officials establishing the Uganda Protectorate.

The history of Mengo Hill is also entwined with that of adjacent Namirembe Hill, the seat of the Anglican Church of Uganda, because of the monarchy's close association with the Church of England. The Bulange, which houses offices for the Kabaka and the Lukiiko (Buganda Parliament), is at the base of Namirembe Hill. The building was constructed between 1953 and 1958 by Muteesa II of Buganda at a cost of US$5 million, which was a colossal sum at that time. Also located on Namirembe Hill is Mengo Hospital, a private, non-profit community hospital administered by the Anglican Church in Uganda.

== Landmarks ==
Landmarks on Mengo Hill or near the hill include:

- The main palace of the King of Buganda, the Lubiri.
- Bulange, the Parliament Building of the Buganda Parliament (the Lukiiko). Moved outside of the palace to the adjacent Namirembe Hill, to accommodate the size of a modern building in 1958, the building also houses the offices of the Kabaka of Buganda
- The Kabaka's Lake, a man-made lake approximately 5 acres (2.0 ha), for the personal use and enjoyment of the Kabaka; located just outside the main palace entrance.
- Mengo Hospital - A 300-bed private hospital, affiliated with the Church of Uganda; located at the adjacent Namirembe Hill.
- The Joint Clinical Research Center - Located adjacent to the palace, the medical research center is housed in the Butikkiro, the former official residence of the Prime Minister of Buganda (Katikkiro). This building is one of Buganda's assets that have yet to be returned to the Kingdom.
- The main campus of St. Lawrence University (Uganda) - Located close to the Kabaka's Lake.
- The buildings of the Uganda Supreme Court
- Namirembe Hill - Adjacent to and immediately northwest of Mengo Hill. It is the location of St. Paul's Cathedral, the most prominent Anglican place of worship in Buganda
- Lubaga Hill - Immediately west of Mengo. The seat of the Roman Catholic Archdiocese of Kampala. Location of St. Mary's Cathedral Rubaga, built between 1912 and 1925.

== Photos ==
- Photo of the Buganda Parliament Building (Bulange)
- Photo of the "Twekobe", the Kabaka's Residence Within Mengo Palace
- Photo of the Newly Reconstructed "Kabaka Anjagala Road", Fitted With Solar Lights. The Bulange Building Is In the Background

== See also ==
- Kampala Capital City Authority
- Kabaka of Buganda
- Lubaga
- Lubaga Division
- Battle of Mengo Hill
