= Temajo =

Island in waters of West Kalimantan, Indonesia

Coordinates: 0°29′58″N 108°51′10″E

Temajo is a small island located in the waters of West Kalimantan, Indonesia.

== Geography ==
Temajo Island is located in Mempawah Regency, West Kalimantan, about 2–3 hours by sea from Pontianak City. Geographically, the island is surrounded by the Natuna Sea and has a tropical climate with quite high rainfall. Temajo Island has several facilities provided for tourists who want to stay overnight, including simple lodging and several cottages that function as resting places.

== History ==
Temajo Island has a historical connection with the Mempawah Sultanate, a sultanate that existed since the 18th century. During its heyday, the Mempawah Sultanate played an important role in the development of culture and trade in the West Kalimantan region. The legacy of this sultanate can be found on Temajo Island in the form of sites that show traces of the greatness of the Mempawah Sultanate. This island is said to have been used as a stopover and strategic surveillance point by the sultanate to protect their waters from external threats.

== Marine biodiversity ==
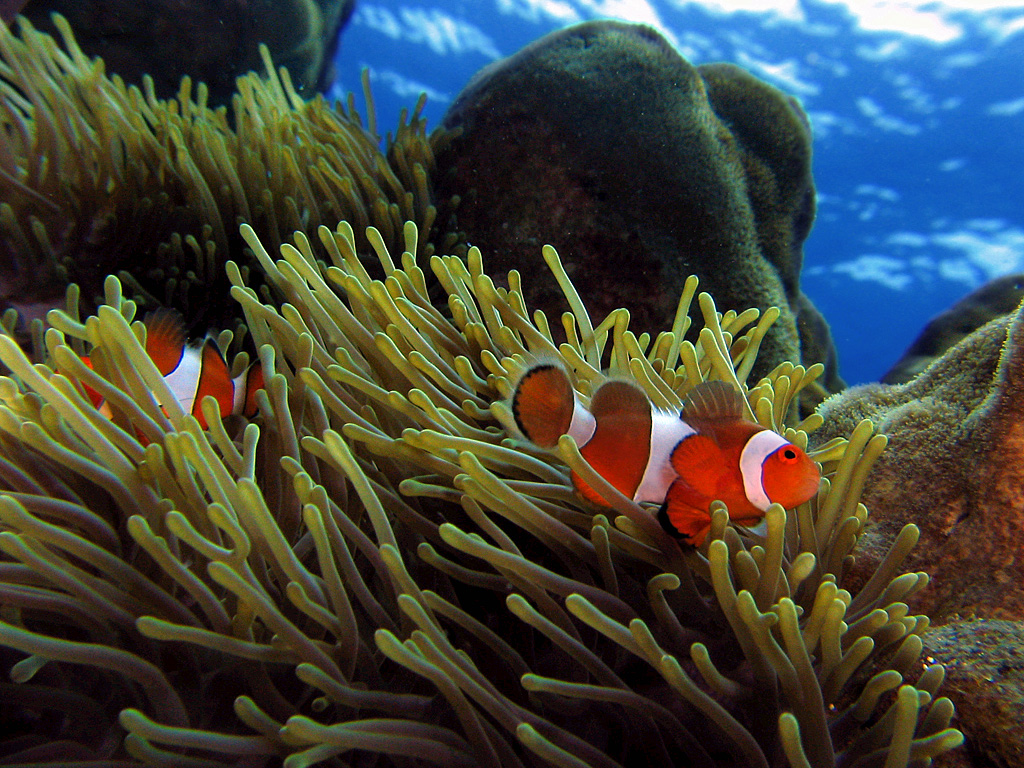
Amphiprioninae

The sea around Temajo Island is an important habitat for various types of marine life. The coral reef ecosystem in the waters around the island is very rich in various types of reef fish, which play an important role in maintaining the balance of the marine ecosystem. The waters surrounding Temajo Island are home to a diverse range of reef fish, contributing to the rich marine biodiversity of the area. Some of the notable species found in the region include the Grouper (Epinephelinae), barramundi (Lates calcarifer), Clownfish (Amphiprioninae), Napoleon Wrasse (Cheilinus undulatus), Surgeonfish (Acanthuridae), Damselfish (Pomacentridae), and Butterflyfish (Chaetodontidae). These species, among others, contribute to the island's thriving coral reef ecosystem, making it a key area for marine biodiversity.
