= Felix Onama =

Ugandan politician

Felix Kenyi Onama (1921-2001) was a Ugandan politician, who served as a minister in the government of Milton Obote (1962–71).

== Biography ==
A Madi, Onama was born in the West Nile District. He was educated at St Mary's College, Kisubi, and Makerere University.

He served as leader of the Ugandan People's Congress (UPC) in the neglected West Nile District, holding political views described as "near reactionary", compared with radical parts of the party. He also served as general manager for the West Nile Co-operative Union, handling cotton ginning, from 1960 until 1962.

He served as Minister of Works and Labour (1962–63), Minister of Internal Affairs (1963–65) and then as Defence Minister from 1966, giving him responsibility for both the police and the military.

Onama believed he had close ties with the military, so when in January 1964, there was a mutiny at the military barracks at Jinja, Uganda's second city and home to a burgeoning military, he was sent by Obote to Jinja to negotiate with the mutineers. Onama was held hostage, beaten and had his shirt torn. Under duress, he agreed to many of their demands, including significant pay increases for the army, and the rapid promotion of many officers.

In 1965–66, Onama was embroiled in the "Gold Scandal" that hit Uganda. Daudi Ochieng, from the Kabaka Yekka party, alleged that some members of the government including Felix Onama, the Prime Minister Obote and Idi Amin, had benefited financially from the sale of gold and elephant tusks from the Congo due to Uganda Army's operations in that country, all of which was contested by Onama.

Following the tightening of party discipline which followed the gold crisis, Onama emerged as the leader of the 'conservative' faction of the UPC, favouring state support for existing businessmen, rather than the state capitalism increasingly espoused by Obote. In 1968, he was elected secretary-general of the Ugandan People's Congress for a seven-year term, although this was ultimately curtailed by the coup of 1971. By 1970, he was a large scale landowner, and owned a bus line, which was nationalised alongside foreign businesses under the terms of the Nakivubo Pronouncement.

Amin, who had taken power in the coup, did not trust Onama and briefly placed him under house arrest in 1972. Onama would later be one of the leaders of the Uganda National Rescue Front.

== Personal life ==
Onama married Semmy, sister of Milton Obote.
