= Bulange =

Royal seat of the Buganda Kingdom

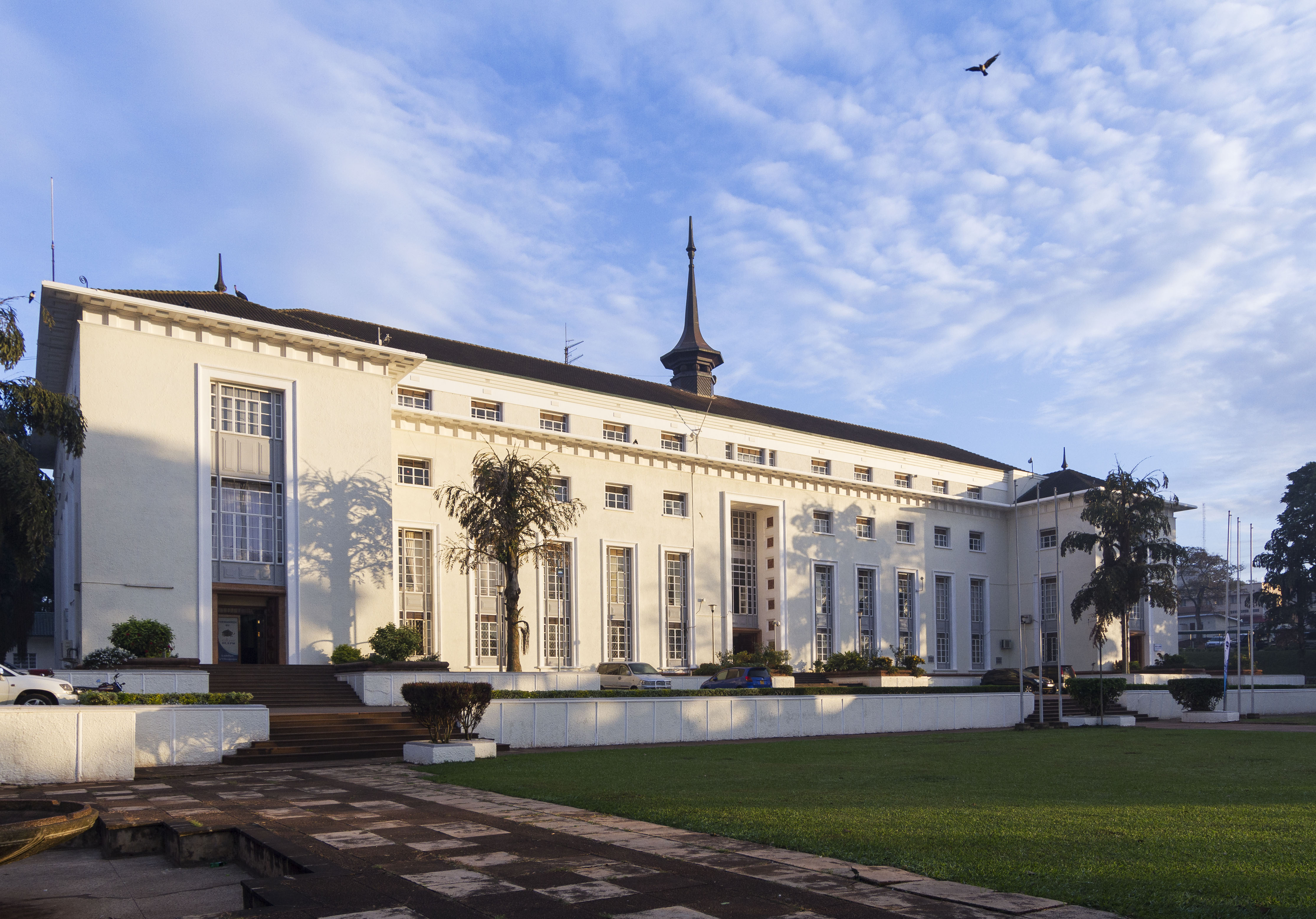

General information
- Type: Cultural
- Location: Kabaka Anjagala Road; Mengo, Kampala, Uganda
- Coordinates: 0.3095°N 32.5585°E
- Construction started: 1955
- Completed: 1958

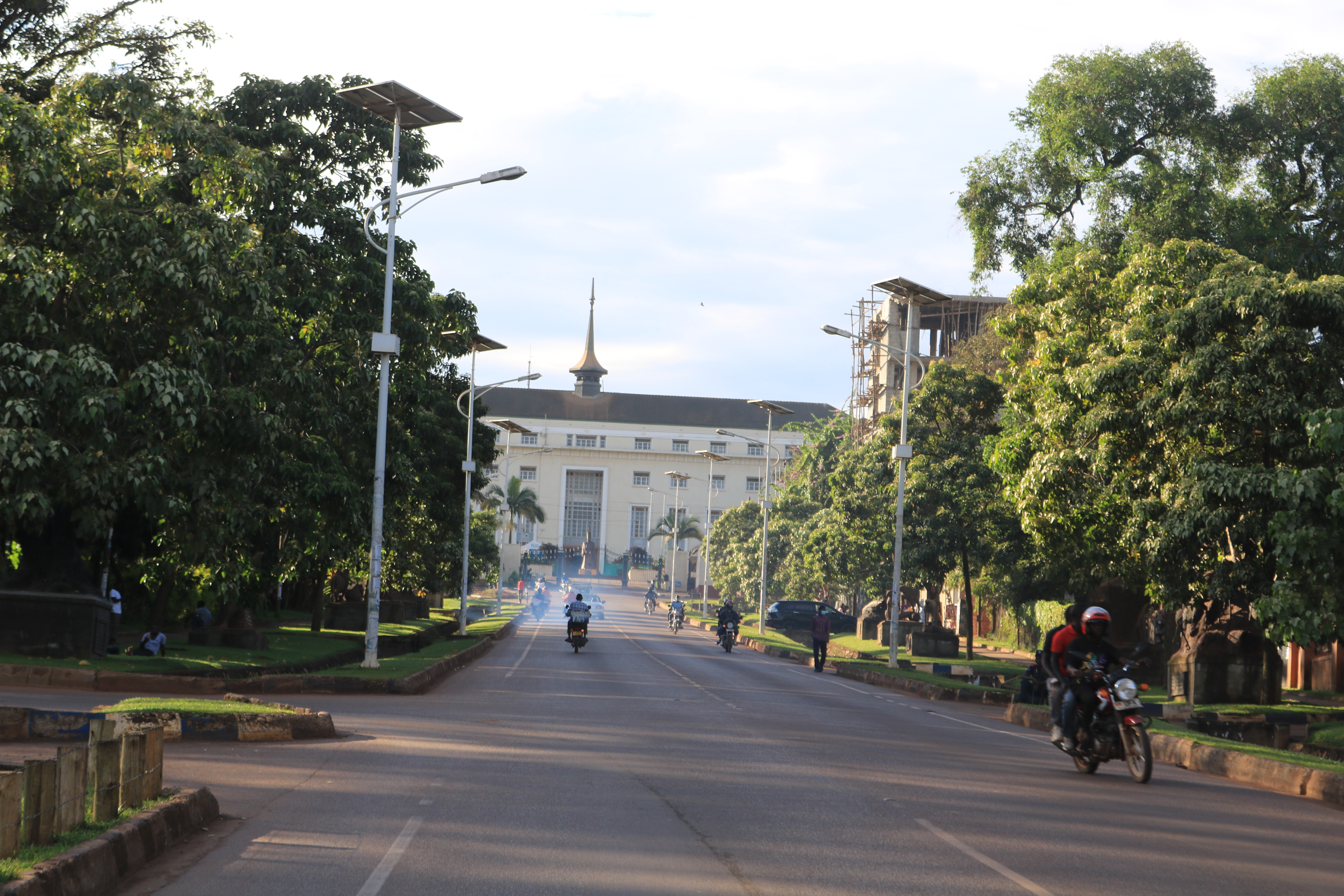
Mengo Bulange .....(Royal Seat Of the Buganda Kingdom).

The Bulange (boo-lah-ngeh) is a building in Kampala, the capital of Uganda. It houses the Lukiiko (Parliament) of the Kingdom of Buganda and is the Royal Seat of the Buganda Kingdom. The Kabaka of Buganda and the Katikkiro (Prime Minister) of Buganda also maintain offices in the building. The building also serves as the administrative headquarters of the Buganda Kingdom.

== Location ==
Bulange building is the official administrative building for Buganda kingdom in central Uganda. Its existence in the area also led to the eventual renaming of the areas around it to be called Bulange. However the Bulange building which is the 'capital building' of Buganda is located on Namirembe Hill close to Namirembe Hospital, about 1 mile (1.6 km) northwest of the main gate of Mengo Palace in Kampala, Uganda's capital and largest city. This is approximately 2 miles (3.2 km) southwest of the city center of Kampala. The coordinates of Bulange are 0°18'35.0"N, 32°33'30.0"E (Latitude:0.309722; Longitude:32.558333). A straight road, approximately 1 mile (1.6 km) long, called Kabaka Anjagala Road (The-King-Loves-Me Road) this road is also at times referred to as the Royal mile leads from the main entrance of the Mengo Palace to the entrance of Bulange.

== History ==
In the beginning, the Buganda Parliament (the Lukiiko) convened inside one of the Kabaka's palaces and conducted business under the shade of one or more trees. Later, grass-thatched buildings served as the parliament buildings. Around the beginning of the 20th century, Prime Minister of Buganda, Apollo Kaggwa, contracted an Indian, Alidina Visram, to build a parliament building using bricks. As the kingdom's government grew in size, the need for a large-enough meeting hall forced the construction of the Bulange outside the King's Palace for the first time. The building was modeled on Stormont in Northern Ireland:

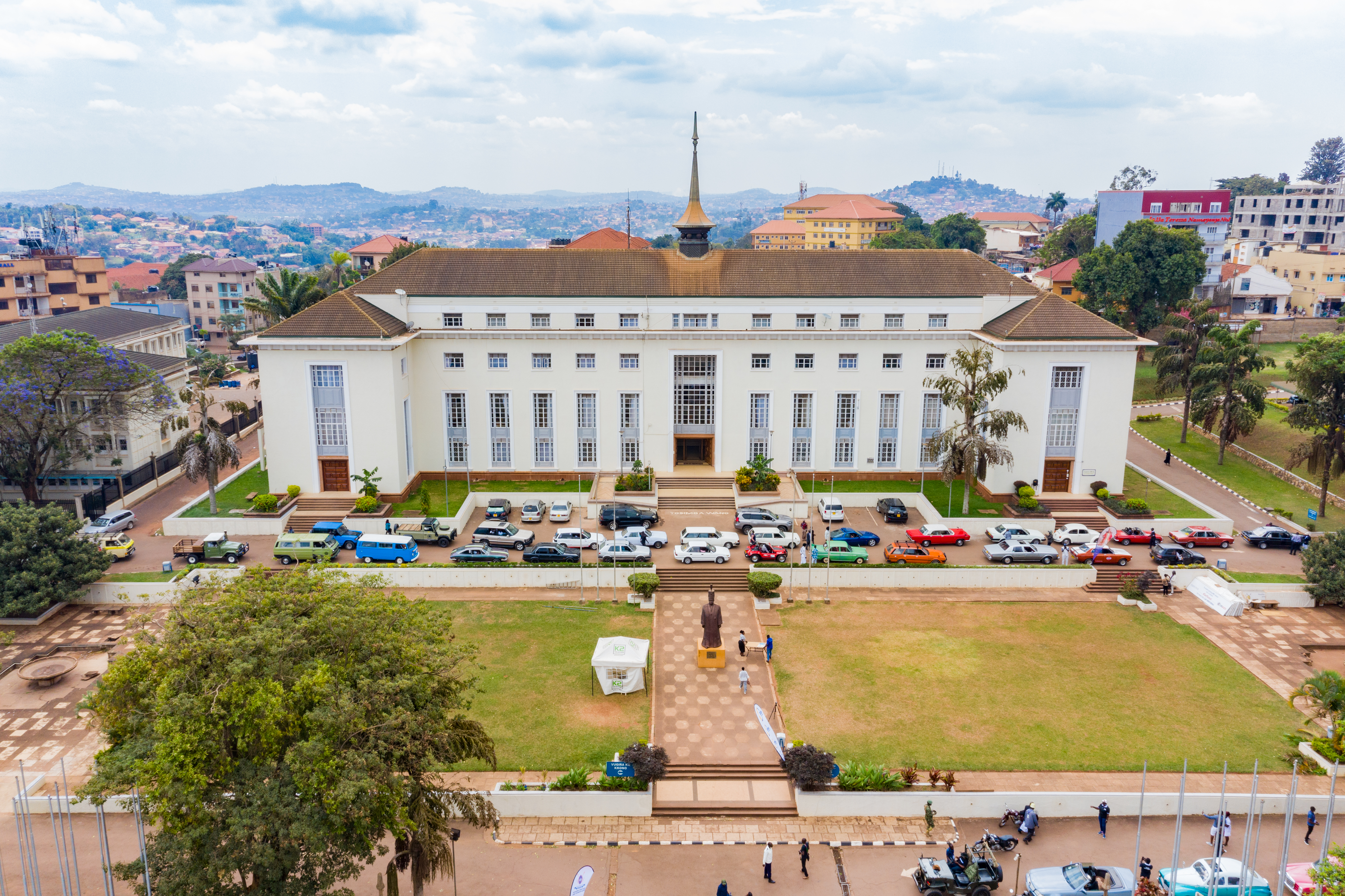
Bulange Mengo

In Ireland I used to stay with Dr. and Mrs. Schofield who had been missionaries in Uganda and known me literally from birth. I saw and admired Stormont, which stood me in good stead later. Designs for the Bulange, a home for the Lukiiko, were being discussed and rejected, so I summoned the architect, showed him a picture of Stormont, and told him that that was the sort of thing I had in mind. The plans were put before the Resident, who accepted mine. Except that there were no balconies because of the sun, that was what was built, and it is the most admired building in Buganda

— Muteesa II, The Kabaka of Buganda, Desecration of My Kingdom

Construction began in 1955 and was completed in 1958 at a cost of £5 million, fully funded by the Government of Buganda.

== See also ==
- Mengo Hill
- Namirembe
- Lubaga Division
- Kampala Capital City Authority
