= Daudi Ochieng =

Ugandan politician

Daudi Ochieng, sometimes styled Ocheng, (1925– 1 June 1966) was a Ugandan politician, who served as secretary general of the Kabaka Yekka (KY) party and Opposition Chief Whip (from 1965). In 1965–6, his allegations – crystallised in a motion he put before Parliament on 4 February 1966 (the "Gold Allegations Motion") – that then-Prime Minister Milton Obote and deputy commander of the Ugandan army Idi Amin had been complicit in the looting and misappropriation of gold, ivory and cash by Congolese rebels precipitated the Gold Scandal.

== Early life and career ==
Daudi Ochieng was born in 1925, the son of Rwot Lacito Oketch of the Temajo. He was educated at King's College Budo, Makerere College, and the University of Wales, before returning to Buganda after graduation. He was elected to Buganda Lukiiko in 1962 and the Parliament of Uganda in 1964, representing Mityana on behalf of the Kabaka Yekka (KY) party.

== Gold Scandal ==
Beginning in March 1965, Ochieng raised in Parliament what he considered to be suspicious payments made to Colonel Idi Amin in February of that year. These allegations came to a head on 4 February 1966 when Ochieng, then secretary-general of KY and Opposition Chief Whip, submitted a motion urging the government to "suspend from duty Colonel Idi Amin pending the conclusion of police investigations into the allegations regarding his bank account, which should then be passed on to the appropriate authority whose final decision on the matter shall be made public".

Introducing his motion, Ochieng accused the then-Prime Minister Milton Obote and deputy commander of the Ugandan army Idi Amin of being complicit in the looting and misappropriation of gold, ivory and cash by Congolese rebels. Ochieng also implicated Felix Onama (the Minister of Defense), and Adoko Nekyon (the Minister of Planning). Parliament, including members of Obote's own party (the UPC, who controlled 74 of 91 seats), voted almost unanimously to back Ochieng's motion, albeit with a range of justifications. The UPC's stance of acceptance, agreed earlier in the day at an emergency meeting of the Cabinet, reversed the position of resistance agreed at a meeting of the full Parliamentary Group on 31 January. In this way, Ochieng's accusations – and the fact that they were seemingly considered even by members of the Cabinet to be plausible enough to deserve investigation, contrary to the agreed position of 31 January – prompted what has come to be known as the "Gold Scandal".

At the time of the motion, "for reasons that are not quite clear", Obote was away from Kampala on a tour of the Northern Region, and therefore unable to influence either the Cabinet's decision to back Ochieng's motion or the debate on the floor of the House. On his return, Obote responded by putting Amin on leave for two weeks and establishing a commission of inquiry. He declared a state of emergency, and on 22 February suspended the 1962 constitution, suspended the Presidency of Edward Mutesa II and Vice Presidency of William Nadiope, and moved to purge the UPC, having five Government Ministers arrested (Grace Ibingira, E. B. S. Lumu, B. K. Kirya, Mathias Mbalule Ngobi, and George B. K. Magezi). In April 1966 Obote published a new, interim constitution (Uganda's second).

Shortly following a diagnosis of stomach cancer, Ochieng died on 1 June 1966.
