= 1971 Ugandan coup d'état =

Overthrow of president Milton Obote

- Part of the Cold War
Date	25 January 1971; 55 years ago
Location	Uganda
Result	Overthrow of Milton Obote; Establishment of the Second Republic of Uganda under Idi Amin

Belligerents
(Uganda) Ugandan government: Loyal state institutions	(Uganda) Ugandan putschists: Rebel military faction; Rebel police faction; Supported by: Israel

Commanders and leaders
Milton Obote (President of Uganda); Basil Kiiza Bataringaya (executed) (Minister of Internal Affairs); Ahmad Oduka (executed) (Senior superintendent of police); Suleiman Hussein (executed)	Idi Amin (Commander of the army); Erinayo Wilson Oryema (Inspector general of police); Juma Butabika; Isaac Maliyamungu

Strength
Unknown	5,700 soldiers; 5,500 policemen

Casualties and losses
Many Acohli and Lango soldiers murdered	Unknown

A military coup d'état overthrew the president of Uganda, Milton Obote, on 25 January 1971. It took place while Obote was attending the Commonwealth Heads of Government Meeting in Singapore, and was staged by Idi Amin, the commander of the Uganda Army at the time. For various reasons, relations between Obote and Amin—his army commander—had become insidiously strained. Amin's plot was primarily driven by a concern to retain power over the military, hence guaranteeing his own personal survival. After the coup's success, Amin installed himself as president; ruling—until 1979—by decree over an impoverished nation. He is often referred to as one of the most brutal dictators in modern political history.

== Background ==
A rift had developed between Amin and Obote, exacerbated by the support Amin had built within the army by recruiting from the West Nile region, his involvement in operations to support the rebellion in southern Sudan and an attempt on Obote's life in 1969. In October 1970, Obote took overall control of the armed forces, reducing Amin from his position as the military's overall head to that of commanding the army.

The Obote government pursued a policy of African nationalism, which antagonized the British and the Israeli governments, both of which maintained a strong presence in Uganda. Obote supported various independence movements in Southern Africa and opposed British weapons sales to the Apartheid South African government, attending the Commonwealth Heads of Government Meeting 1971 in order to address this issue. The British government was also opposed to Obote's Move to the Left, a series of socialist-orientated policies that hindered the operations of international corporations; in addition, the British government feared that these initiatives would provoke the departure of the Asian community in Uganda, who were British subjects and would likely emigrate to the United Kingdom, a possibility the UK government was unprepared for.

Israel initially maintained close relations with Obote's government, and used Uganda as a means to channel support to Anyanya rebels in southern Sudan with the hope of distracting Sudan from supporting Palestine in the Arab–Israeli conflict. In 1969 Jaafar Nimeiry came to power in Sudan via a coup and pledged to end the war in the country. Obote summarily ordered the end of all aid to the Anyanya, troubling the Israeli government.

== Causes ==
Having learned that Obote was planning to arrest him for misappropriating army funds, Amin launched a coup on 25 January 1971, while Obote was attending a Commonwealth summit meeting in Singapore. Army and military police forces loyal to Amin moved to secure strategic positions in and around Kampala and Entebbe. The putschists sealed off Entebbe International Airport to prevent Obote's return, and tanks and soldiers patrolled the streets of Kampala and Entebbe. Here, some soldiers loyal to President Obote and members of the General Service Unit resisted the coup forces while some fighting also took place at the Kampala police college. Fierce fighting was reported in Jinja, about 80 kilometres (50 mi) from Kampala. Obote's residence was surrounded and, major roads were blocked. A nighttime curfew was imposed by the coup forces. Overall, the Obote loyalists were too disorganized to offer an effective resistance, and they were quickly overwhelmed. At 4:30 p.m. it was announced that the Army and the police under Amin's leadership had control of the entire country.

Some historians have claimed that the British government may have been involved in orchestrating the coup. Obote was a supporter of independence movements in Southern Africa and chose to attend the Commonwealth Heads of Government Meeting 1971 to oppose British weapons sales to the Apartheid South African government. The decision was taken at the meeting to allow the British government to proceed with the arms sale, but the issue threatened to split apart the Commonwealth. However, recent scholarship has cast a great deal of doubt upon claims of British involvement; evidence is scant, with accusations implicating the British government relying upon dubious interrogation testimony and the (at times) implicative mere behaviour of the Foreign Office after the fact.

Uganda radio broadcasts accused the Obote government of corruption and said the army believed Obote's policies result in violence and accused him of giving preferential treatment to certain regions of the country. The broadcast was reportedly met with cheering crowds in the capital. After having seized control of the government, Amin moved to purge the military of political rivals, and orchestrated the murder of Langi soldiers (Obote's tribe) and their Acholi cousins. By 1972, about 5,000 of them had been killed.

== Aftermath ==
As he consolidated his power as military dictator, Amin ordered numerous purges against suspected opponents, resulting in an estimated 300,000 Ugandans murdered over eight years of Amin's rule. Thousands consequently fled to Tanzania, where they joined Obote's dissidents. With the approval of President of Tanzania Julius Nyerere, these Ugandan exiles formed a small guerilla army, and invaded Uganda in 1972. The popular uprising against Amin they had hoped for failed to materialize, however, and the invasion was defeated. Nevertheless, the conflict resulted in a sharp deterioration of relations between Uganda and Tanzania, which ultimately contributed to the Uganda–Tanzania War and the fall of Amin's regime in 1979.

== In popular culture ==
- The Rise and Fall of Idi Amin (1981) opens with the coup.
- The coup is portrayed in the film Last King of Scotland (2006).

== See also ==
- Second Republic of Uganda
