= Katikkiro of Buganda =

Premier of Buganda, Uganda

- Coat of arms of Buganda

- Flag of Buganda

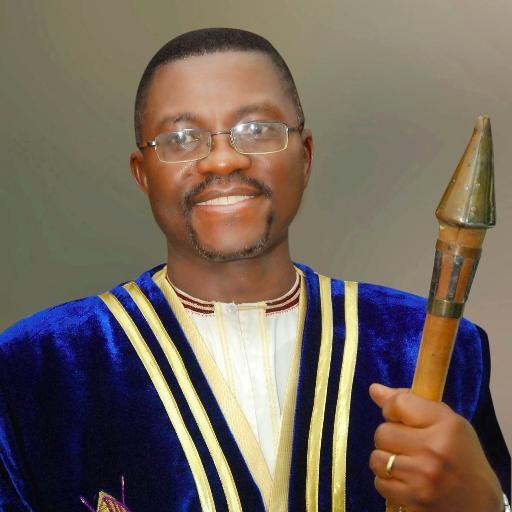
- Incumbent; Charles Mayiga since May 2013
- Style: The Right Honourable
- Residence: Butikkiro
- Appointer: The Kabaka
- Term length: At His Majesty's pleasure

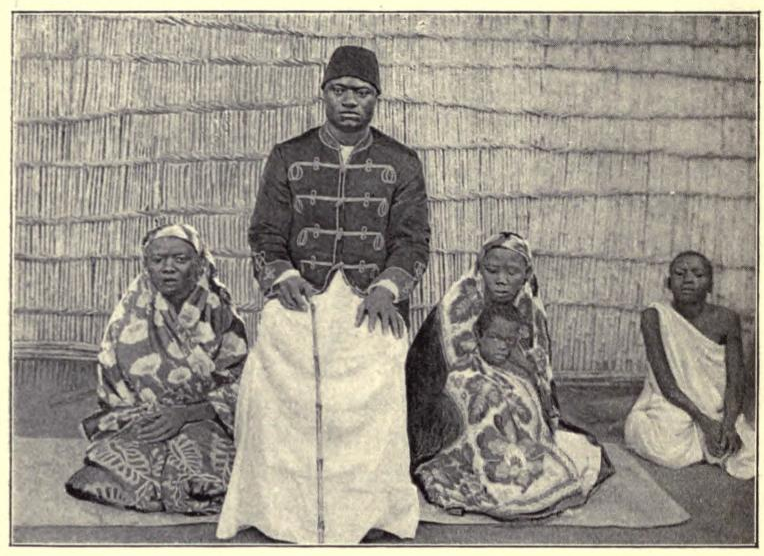
Kattikiro Apollo Kaggwa

The Katikkiro is the prime minister of the Kingdom of Buganda, one of the traditional kingdoms within Uganda. The Katikkiro is subordinate to Buganda's monarch, the Kabaka. The position was originally a direct parallel to the Lord High Chancellor in medieval England. Since the colonial era the position has been more equivalent to a Prime Minister in other governmental systems, though the Katikkiro still does not assume office through elections but rather through appointment by the Kabaka. The office represents the oldest continuous premiership in East Africa, deeply rooted in the customs and governance structure of the Baganda.

Buganda is a traditional kingdom in modern-day Uganda located in the central region of the East African country. The current Katikkiro is Charles Peter Mayiga of the Mutima clan and was appointed by the current monarch, Muwenda Mutebi II of Buganda in May 2013, replacing Engineer John Baptist Walusimbi.

== History ==
This title is as old as the kingdom itself. The first known Katikkiro was a man named Walusimbi of the Ffumbe Clan, who was the Katikkiro (Prime Minister) during the reign of Chwa I Nabakka, the second Kabaka of Buganda, who reigned during the middle of the 14th century. Walusimbi continued to rule following the death of Chwa I. He was succeeded as Katikkiro by Ssebwaana (This title (Ssebwaana) is also held by a saza (Busiro county) chief in Buganda. His rain lasted until 1374, when Kabaka Kimera I ascended the throne 1374.

Historically, the Katikkiro was selected from among the clan heads (Abataka) or leading chiefs and was known for wisdom, loyalty, and strategic thinking. Over time, the office evolved into the de facto head of the kingdom's civil service, responsible for the day-to-day running of the Kingdom when the Kabaka was engaged in war, diplomacy, or spiritual duties. During the colonial period, the Katikkiro maintained significant influence and represented Buganda's interests in interactions with the British colonial administration. The position has been described as representing "the oldest continuous premiership in East Africa," with the Katikkiro serving as both a political leader and cultural custodian.

== Powers and responsibilities ==
The Katikkiro has always held immense influence within the Kingdom's governmental structure. The authority of the Katikkiro is symbolized by the Ddamula stick, which is given to him by the Kabaka as a tool to 'kulamula' (rule over) in the kingdom on his behalf. The core responsibilities of the Katikkiro include presiding over the Lukiiko (Parliament) and overseeing Cabinet decisions, executing royal decrees and national programs, and supervising the County Chiefs (Abamasaza). Additional duties encompass guarding the royal seals and assets of the Kingdom, mobilizing the clans for cultural and national causes, and representing the Kabaka in key ceremonies and state functions. The Katikkiro serves as both the public face of Buganda's government and the chief strategist of its development and restoration efforts.

Prior to 1900, the Principal leaders that governed the Buganda at the pleasure of the Kabaka were:

1. The Katikkiro, who was the Lord Chancellor and Chief Justice.
2. The Kimbugwe, who had charge of the guardian and priest of the Kabaka's most important temple.
3. The Kago, who held the office of Ssabadu to the Kabaka (head of all the royal servants), and governed the Kyaddondo province
4. The Mukwenda, who held the office of Ssabagabo to the Kabaka (head of the shield bearers), and governed the province of Ssingo
5. The Ssekiboobo, who held the office of Ssabawali to the King, and governed the Kyaggwe province
6. The Kangawo, who held the office of Mwogozi to the King, and governed the Bulemeezi province
7. The Mugema, called the King's father (Nakazade), who governed the Busiro province
8. The Kaima, who governed the Mawokota province
9. The Kitunzi, who governed the Gomba province
10. The Pokino, who governed the Buddu province
11. The Kasujju, who governed the Busujju province
12. The Katambala, who governed the Butambala province

The latter ten chiefs were equivalent to provincial governors and reported their activities to the Katikkiro. The 1900 Buganda Agreement split the Katikkiro's roles, creating a special office of the Mulamuzi (Chief Justice) and a role of Muwanika (Head of the Treasury). The three key leaders that governed Buganda at the Kabaka's pleasure were:

1. The Katikkiro, who was in principle the Chief Minister of Buganda
2. The Mulamuzi, who served as the Chief Justice of Buganda
3. The Mulamuzi, who was the Head of the Buganda Treasury

The county governors continued in their administrative roles in the respective counties.

Since the reinstatement of kingdoms and cultural institutions in uganda in 1993, the Kabaka's cabinet expanded to 15 roles as of 2025. Two of the top ministers below the Katikkiro are raised to the rank of Deputy Katikkiro (Omumyuka wa Katikkiro).

Position	English Translation	Present Holder
Kattikiro	Prime Minister	Charles Peter Mayiga
Minisita Avunaanyizibwa ku Nzirukanya y’Emirimu: Tekinologiiya n’Obuyiiya	Minister for Administration & ICT	Prof. Twaha Kigongo Kaawaase
Omuwanika	Minister of Finance	Owek. Robert Wagwa Nsibirwa
Omukubiriza w’Olukiiko lwa Buganda	Speaker of the Great Buganda Lukiiko	Owek. Patrick Luwaga Mugumbule
Omumyuka w'Omukubiriza w’Olukiiko lwa Buganda	Deputy Speaker of the Great Buganda Lukiiko	Owek. Ahmed Lwasa
Ssaabawolereza wa Buganda	The Kingdom Attorney General	Owek. Christopher Bwanika
Minisita w’Olukiiko; Kabineeti, n’Ensonga ez’enjawulo mu woofiisi ya Katikkiro	Minister for Lukiiko, Information; Cabinet Affairs, Protocol and the Official Kingdom Spokesperson	Owek. Noah Kiyimba
Ministule y’Ettaka n’Ebizimbe	Ministry of Lands and Properties	Owek. David F.K. Mpanga
Ministule y’Enkulakulana y’Abantu (Byanjigiriza;Byabulamu) n’Ensonga za woofisi ya Nnaabagereka	Ministry of Social services (Education; Health) and Nnaabagereka’s office)	Owek Cotilda Nakate Kikomeko
Ministule ya Gavumenti ez’Ebitundu; Okulambula kwa Kabaka; n’Ensonga z’Abantu ba Buganda Ebweru	Ministry of Local Government, Kabaka’s Tours and Diaspora Affairs	Owek. Joseph Kawuki
Ministule ya Bulungibwansi; Obutonde bw’Ensi; Amazzi n’Ekikula ky’Abantu	Ministry of Community Self Help, Environment, Water and Gender	Owek. Mariam Nkalubo Mayanja
Ministule y’Obulimi; Obwegassi; Obusuubuzi n’Obuvubi	Ministry of Agriculture, Co-operatives, Commerce and Fisheries	Owek. Amiisi Kakomo
Ministule y’Amawulire; Okukunga Abantu; era Omwogezi w’ObwaKabaka	Ministry of Information, Mobilization and Kingdom Spokesperson	Owek. Israel Kazibwe Kitooke
Ministule y’Obuwangwa; Embiri; Amasiro; Obulambuzi n’Ebyokwerinda	Ministry of Heritage, Palaces, Tombs, Tourism and Security	Owek. Anthony Wamala
Ministule y’Abavubuka;Emizannyo n’Ebitone	Ministry of Youth, Sports and the Arts	Owek. Robert Sserwanga

== Selection of the Katikkiro ==
The selection of the Katikkiro of Buganda is a sole responsibility of the supreme ruler of the Kingdom who is the Kabaka of Buganda. He hands over the 'Ddamula' (the royal mace) which is got from Ssese county in Kalangala District in a forest called Luggo cultural Forest. After Kabaka handing over Ddamula to the Katikkiro (designate) usually at the gate of Bulange (The main administrative building), the Katikkiro pledges his allegiance to the Kabaka and promises to execute the duties assigned to him by the Kabaka. The Katikkiro thereafter has to ensure that he holds the Ddamula (Royal mace) which is the symbol of authority with the assistance of members of his clan until when he reaches 'Butikkiro' (The official residence of the Katikkiro of Buganda). If the Katikkiro loses grip of the Ddamula to any other person before reaching Butikkiro he loses the seat to the person who takes Ddamula away from him however When Katikkiro reaches the Butikkiro with Ddamula it cements his appointment and he thereafter holds a celebration that usually involves organising a special cultural dinner for his guests.

== Butikkiro ==
Butikkiro is the official residence of the Katikkiro of Buganda. It is situated near Bulange as it is ideal that the Katikkiro is the first person to be asked about the wellbeing of the Kabaka and also accommodates the visitors of the Kabaka.

Traditionally, it was built using thatched roofing and natural materials, located close to the royal palace (Lubiri) to symbolize the closeness between the King and his Prime Minister. Historically, every newly appointed Katikkiro was required to construct a new Butikkiro as a symbol of his capacity to lead and rally the people. This process involved significant mobilization of clan support and was often the first public test of a Katikkiro's leadership and popularity. In modern times, the Butikkiro has evolved into a formal residence and administrative hub for the Katikkiro's duties, including meeting rooms, traditional artifacts, and guest spaces for diplomatic and cultural engagements.

== Notable Katikkiros ==
Throughout history, several Katikkiros have left significant marks on Buganda's development and governance. Katikkiro Walusimbi was an early Katikkiro famed for his wisdom during the era of Kabaka Semakokiro. Apollo Kaggwa served as a reformist and historian who was appointed prime minister by King Mwanga II in 1890 and served until 1926, also serving as prince regent from 1897 until 1914. Kaggwa was recognized as "Buganda's first and foremost ethnographer" and authored several historical works including "Basekabaka be'Buganda."

Martin Luther Nsibirwa served twice as Katikkiro (1929-1941 and July-September 1945) and was assassinated on September 15, 1945, at Namirembe Cathedral. His assassination was largely attributed to his controversial support for land allocation to expand Makerere College into a university, as well as his support for the queen mother's remarriage contrary to traditional customs. Nsibirwa was a self-taught man who did not attend formal school but rose through the ranks with mentorship from Sir Apollo Kaggwa.

Joash Mayanja Nkangi served both before and after the abolition of kingdoms, and later during the Kingdom's restoration. The current Katikkiro, Charles Peter Mayiga, has been known for his leadership, innovation, and the "Ettofaali" development campaign since his appointment in May 2013.

== List of the Katikkiros ==
- [with Tebandeke] Mujambula
- [with Ndawula] Nsobya
- [with Kagulu] Ntambi
- [with Kikulwe] Mawuuba
- [with Kikulwe] Nakiyenje
- [with Kikulwe] Nakikofu
- 1740? - 1741 Ssebanakitta
- 1741 - 1750 Kagali
- 1750 - 17.. Kabinuli
- 17.. - 1780 Lugoloobi
- 1780 - 17.. Ssendegeya
- 17.. - 17.. Mayembe
- 17.. - 1797 Kagenda
- 1797 - .... Nabbunga
- .... - .... Ssekayiba
- .... - .... Nabembezi
- 1814? Kadduwamala
- 18.. - 18.. Katimpa
- 18.. - 18.. Kafumbirwango
- 18.. - 18.. Kimoga
- 18.. - 1832 Ssebuko
- 1832 - 18.. Migeekyamye
- Kayiira (1856?)
- Kisomose (18.. - 18..)
- Mayanja (18.. - 18..)
- Mulere (18.. - 18..)
- Mukasa (1884? - 1888)
- Nnyonyintono (1888)
- Muguluma (1888 - 1889)
- Apollo Kaggwa (1889 - 1926)
- Kisosonkole (Feb 1927 - 1929)
- Martin Luther Nsibirwa (1929-1941)
- Samuel Wamala (1941-1945)
- Martin Luther Nsibirwa (1945)
- Michael Kawalya Kagwa (1945-1950)
- Paulo Kavuma (1950–1955)
- Michael Kintu (1955-1964)
- Joash Mayanja Nkangi (1964-1993)
- Joseph Mulwanyammuli Ssemwogerere (1994-2005)
- Dan Muliika (2005-2007)
- Emmanuel Ndawula (2007-2008)
- John Baptist Walusimbi (2008-2013)
- Charles Mayiga (2013–present)

=== Table of Katikiros ===
Table of Katikiros as extracted from Sir Apollo Kaggwa's Basekabaka be’Buganda.

Katikiro	Clan	Monarchies Served
Kisolo	Ŋonge (Otter)	Kato Kintu
Kakulukuku	Lugave (Pangolin)	Kato Kintu
Walusimbi	Ffumbe (Civet Cat)	Chwa I Nabakka & Kimera
Bakitenda	Ffumbe (Civet Cat)	Kimera
Kiridde	(Yam)	Ttembo
Kasongovu	Mmamba (Lung fish)	Kiggala Mukaabya
Ssendikaddiwa	Nsenene (Grasshopper)	Kayima
Walugali	Lugave (Pangolin)	Kayima
Kigali	Nvuma (Pearl)	Nakibinge
Kalumba	Ffumbe (Civet Cat)	Nnakibinge
Sekaggya	Nvuma (Pearl)	Mulondo
Kisolo	Nsenene (Grasshopper)	Suuna I & Sekamaanya
Kamegere	Ffumbe (Civet Cat)	Kimbugwe & Kateregga
Mwesezi	Ffumbe (Civet Cat)	Mutebi I
Wannanda	Butiko (Mushroom)	Juuko
Mulwana	Ŋonge (Otter)	Jjuuko
Kisiki	Butiko (Mushroom)	Kayemba
Lugwanye	Civet Cat (Ffumbe)	Kayemba
Mayambala	Civet Cat (Ffumbe)	Tebandeke
Nsobya	Civet Cat (Ffumbe)	Ndawula
Ntambi	Njovu (Elephant)	Kagulu
Mawuuba	Mmamba (Lung fish)	Kikulwe
Nnakiyenje	Butiko (Mushroom)	Kikulwe
Sebanakitta	Mmamba (Lung fish)	Mawanda & Mwanga I
Kagali	Nvuma (Pearl)	Namuggala
Kabinuli	Nvuma (Pearl)	Kyabaggu
Lugoloobi	Nvuma (Pearl)	Kyabaggu
Ssendegeya	Mmamba (Lung fish)	Jjunju
Mayembe	Mmamba (Lung fish)	Jjunju
Kagenda	Mmamba (Lung fish)	Jjunju
Nabbunga	Ndiga (Sheep)	Semakookiro
Ssekayiba-Nabembezi	Mbogo (Buffalo)	Ssemakokiro
Kiyanzi	Mbogo (Buffalo)	Ssemakokiro
Kadduwamala	Nvuma (Pearl)	Ssemakokiro & Kamaanya
Katimpa	Nvuma (Pearl)	Kamaanya
Kafumbirwango	Lugave (Pangolin)	Kamaanya
Kinogo	Lugave (Pangolin)	Kamaanya
Sebuko	Mmamba (Lung fish)	Kamaanya
Migekyamye	Ngabi (Bushbuck)	Suuna II
Kityamuweesi Kayiira	Mbogo (Buffalo)	Ssuuna II & Muteesa I
Kisomose	Mmamba (Lung fish)	Muteesa I
Mayanja	Nkima (Vervet Monkey)	Muteesa I
Mulere	Njovu (Elephant)	Muteesa I
Mukasa Nsimbe	Musu (Edible Rat)	Muteesa I & Mwanga II

Katikiros from 1888 to modern times

Katikiro	Tenure	Monarchies Served
Henry Nnyonyintono	1888	Kiweewa Mutebi
Muguluma	1888-1889	Kabaka Kalema
Apollo Kaggwa	1889-1926	Mwanga II & Daudi Chwa
Stanislaus Mugwanya	1889-1900	Mwanga II
Tefero Ssekkuuma Kisosonkole	1927-1929	Daudi Chwa II
Martin Luther Nsibirwa	1929-1941 & 1945	Daudi Chwa II & Sir Edward Muteesa II
Samuel Wamala	1941-1945	Muteesa II
Michael Kawalya Kagwa	1945-1950	Muteesa II
Paulo Kavuma	1950-1955	Muteesa II
Michael Kintu	1955-1964	Muteesa II

== Modern role ==
In contemporary Uganda, the Katikkiro continues to play a significant role in cultural preservation and development within the Kingdom of Buganda. The current Katikkiro has been active in promoting education, youth development, and economic empowerment throughout the kingdom. The office has also focused on agricultural modernization, with the Katikkiro advocating for scientific-based farming approaches and touring agricultural research institutions to promote innovation.

== See also ==
- Kabaka of Buganda
- Lukiiko
- Bulange
- Buganda
- Kingdom of Buganda
- Charles Peter Mayiga
- History of Buganda
- Baganda people
- Kingdoms of Uganda
