= Buganda Investments and Commercial Undertakings Limited =

- Company type: Private
- Industry: Finance & Investments
- Founded: 1993
- Headquarters: Kampala, Uganda
- Key people: Stephen Mwanje; Chairman; Roland Sebuwufu; CEO
- Products: Real estate, hotels and resorts, broadcasting companies, shopping malls
- Website: Homepage

Buganda Investments and Commercial Undertakings Limited (BICUL), is a holding company of the investment and business entities, owned by the Kingdom of Buganda, a constitutional monarchy in modern-day Uganda Kabaka of Buganda

== Location ==
The headquarters of BICUL are located in the Bulange building, in Lubaga Division, about 4.5 kilometres (3 mi) west of the central business district of Kampala, the capital and largest city in the country. The coordinates of the headquarters of BICUL are 0°18'36.0"N, 32°33'30.0"E (Latitude:0.310007; Longitude:32.558333).

== Overview ==
BICUL is the investment arm of Buganda Kingdom. The Kingdom's investments include real estate developments, media houses and other joint ventures.

== Subsidiaries and associated companies ==
The companies that comprise BICUL include the following:

1. Central Broadcasting Service, 88.8 FM and 89.2 FM
2. Buganda Broadcasting Services- Majorly a luganda television station.
3. K2 telecom
4. Buganda Cultural and Development Foundation (BUCADEF), an NGO
5. Buganda Heritage & Tourism Board
6. Namulondo Investments Limited
7. Majestic Brands Limited
8. Muteesa 1 Royal University

== See also ==
- Buganda
- Kabaka of Buganda
- Katikkiro of Buganda
