= Kagulu =

Kagulu may be,

- Kagulu language, Tanzania
- Kagulu Hill, Uganda
- Kagulu of Buganda
