= Ndawula of Buganda =

Ssekabaka Ndawula

Kabaka of Buganda
- Reign: 1724 – 1734
- Predecessor: Tebandeke of Buganda
- Successor: Kagulu of Buganda
- Born: Uganda
- Died: 1734; Lubaga
- Burial: Musaba, Busiro
- Spouse: 1. Lady Nabisubi; 2. Lady Naggujja; 3. Lady Nakikulwe; 4. Lady Nakidde Luyiga; 5. Lady Nakyomubi; 6. Lady Nampanga; 7. Lady Nazzaluno
- Father: Juuko of Buganda
- Mother: Namasole Nandawula Kabengano

Ndawula was the 19th Kabaka, or king, of the Kingdom of Buganda from 1724 to 1734. He is remembered as a kind and gentle king.

== Claim to the throne ==
He was the fifth son of Kabaka Juuko Mulwaana, Kabaka of Buganda, who reigned between 1680 and 1690. His mother was Nandawula Kabengano of the Nsenene clan, the fifth of his father's six wives. He ascended to the throne upon the death of his cousin. He established his capital at Lubaga.

== Reign ==
Some of the great officers of state during his reign included;

Name	Clan	Position	Translation
Nsobya	Ffumbe (Civet Cat)	Katikiro	Chief Minister
Mukubira	Ngeye (Colobus Monkey)	Kimbugwe	Second Minister
Wankalubo	Lugave (Pangolin)	Kasujju	Governor of Busujju
Ssendigya	Mmamba (Lung fish)	Kangaawo	Governor of Bulemezi
Ssebina	Nkima (Vervet Monkey)	Mugema	Governor of Busiro
Kajongo, Nalumenya & Maseruka	Ntalaganya (Duiker)	Kitunzi	Governor of Gomba
Manganyi	Ndiga (Sheep)	Katambala	Governor of Butambala

== Married life ==
He is reported to have married seven (7) wives:

- Nabisubi, daughter of Namenyeka of the Mamba clan
- Naggujja, daughter of Mukalo, of the Njovu clan
- Nakikulwe Namirembe, daughter of Kayindi
- Nakidde Luyiga, daughter of Segiriinya, of the Ngo clan
- Nakyomubi, daughter of Gabunga, of the Mamba clan.
- Nampanga, daughter of Gunju, of the Butiko clan
- Nazzaluno, daughter of Walusimbi, of the Ffumbe clan

== Issue ==
Kabaka Ndawula is reported to have fathered ten (10) children; eight (8) sons and two (2) daughters:

- Kabaka Kagulu Tebukywereke Ntambi, Kabaka of Buganda, who reigned between 1734 and 1744, whose mother was Naggujja
- Prince (Omulangira) Musanje Golooba, whose mother was Nakidde Luyiga.
  - Prince Musanje Golooba married three wives: (a) Bawuna, daughter of Magunda, of the Ffumbe clan (b) Nabulya Naluggwa, daughter of Lutalo, of the Ndiga clan and (c) Namirembe, daughter of Sematengo, of the Ndiga clan. He fathered four (4) sons: (a) Kabaka Mwanga I Sebanakitta, Kabaka of Buganda, who reigned between 1740 and 1741, whose mother was Nabulya Naluggwa (b) Kabaka Namuggala Kagali, Kabaka of Buganda, who reigned between 1741 and 1750, whose mother was Nabulya Naluggwa (c) Kabaka Kyabaggu Kabinuli, Kabaka of Buganda, who reigned between 1750 and 1780, whose mother was Nabulya Naluggwa and (d) Prince (Omulangira) Kayondo, whose mother was Namirembe. Prince Musanje Golooba was executed on the orders of his half-brother Kabaka Kagulu Tebukywereke for the murder of Prince (Omulangira) Luyenje.
- Kabaka Mawanda Sebanakitta, Kabaka of Buganda, who ruled between 1738 and 1740, whose mother was Nakidde Luyiga
- Kabaka Kikulwe Mawuba, Kabaka of Buganda, who reigned between 1736 and 1738, whose mother was Nakikulwe
- Prince (Omulangira) Segaamwenge
- Prince (Omulangira) Luyenje. He was killed by his half-brother, Prince Musanje.
- Prince (Omulangira) Ndege, whose mother was Nakidde Luyiga
- Prince (Omulangira) Bezzaluno, whose mother was Nazzaluno
- Princess (Omumbejja) Ndege, Nassolo.
- Princess (Omumbejja) Kyomubi, whose mother was Nakyomubi

== The final years ==
Kabaka Ndawula died of old age around 1734, at the Kasajjakaliwano Palace, at Lubaga. He is buried at Musaba, Busiro.

The head Prince of his lineage bears the title Ssezaalunnyo Walugembe, with his seat at Mawule in Kyaddondo.

== Quotes ==
"Ndawula himself was a man of peace; he reigned long and had a very large family. The turbulence of Ndawula's numerous sons broke the tranquil atmosphere he had established in the country."

- MM Semakula Kiwanuka, A History of Buganda, 1971

"Ndawula was an excellent king, good natured and peaceful. He was always on the best of terms with his chiefs."

- Apollo Kaggwa

== See also ==
- Kabaka of Buganda

Preceded by Tebandeke	King of Buganda c.1724–c.1734	Succeeded by Kagulu
