= Mrs Korea =

The Mrs. Korea Pageant, often referred to as Mrs. Korea World, is a beauty and career competition that was established to honor married women throughout South Korea. The 2012 winner is Hera Han of Seoul.

== Titleholders ==
Titleholders are designated by year of reign.

Year	Name	State	Notes
2008	Kyung-hee Park	Seoul	
2009	Yoo-young Lee	Seoul	
2010	Sunny Han	Daegu	
2012	Sua Park	Seoul	
2012	Joora Mi	Paris	
2019	Hera Han	Seoul	
