= Kateregga of Buganda =

Ssekabaka Kateregga Kamegere

Kabaka of Buganda
- Reign: 1644 – 1674
- Predecessor: Kimbugwe of Buganda
- Successor: Mutebi I of Buganda
- Born: Uganda
- Died: 1674; Mitw'ebiri
- Burial: Buteregga, Busiro
- Spouse: 1. Lady Nakabugo; 2. Lady Nakamu; 3. Lady Nakinyago; 4. Lady Naalongo Kawenyera; 5. Lady Naluggwa; 6. Lady Namayumba; 7. Lady Namugayi; 8. Lady Namutebi; 9. Lady Nanzigu
- Father: Sekamaanya of Buganda
- Mother: Namasole Nabuuso

Kateregga Kamegere was the 14th Kabaka of the Kingdom of Buganda between 1644 and 1674.

== Claim to the throne ==
He was the only son of Sekabaka Sekamaanya, who reigned between 1614 and 1634. His mother was Nabakyaala Nabuuso, the Naabagareka, his father's only wife. He ascended to the throne following the death of his stepfather, allegedly, after killing him by witchcraft around 1644.

During the reign of Kimbugwe, Prince Kateregga had twin sons. While performing the birth rituals in the presence of the Kabaka, Kateregga was accompanied by a different woman instead of the mother of the twins, because the latter was lame. Kimbugwe's inquisitiveness about the absence of the twins' mother angered Kateregga, who stormed out midway through the ceremony. Kateregga declared war on Kabaka Kimbugwe, in which he usurped the throne from his cousin.

== His reign ==
He established his capital at Lugeye Hill.

Kateregga is noted for his violent character, and the persecutions he carried out against the Ngo (leopard) clan for their claims to have royal links. Members of the clan found themselves migrating, joining other clans or founding separate clans in order to hide their identity.

To Buganda's territory, Kateregga added Butambala and Gomba through conquest. He installed his own chiefs in these regions as well is in south Singo. His appointment of royal favourites to administrative positions in the provinces reflects a move away from the indirect rule of clan heads and hereditary chiefs towards more direct rule by the monarchy.

== Married life ==
He married nine (9) wives:

- Nakabugo, daughter of Mugema, of the Nkima clan
- Nakamu, daughter of Kinyolo, of the Nkima clan
- Nakinyago, daughter of Naserenga, of the Ffumbe clan
- Naalongo Kawenyera, sister of Nakabugo, and daughter of Mugema, of the Nkima clan
- Naluggwa, daughter of Lwoomwa, of the Ndiga clan
- Namayumba, daughter of Mugema, of the Nkima clan
- Namugayi, daughter of Mpinga, of the Lugave clan
- Namutebi, daughter of Mbaja, of the Mamba clan.
- Nanzigu, daughter of Sekayiba, of the Mbogo clan.

He also married 100 reserve wives and 200 maiden servants.

== Issue ==
He fathered fifteen (15) children:

- Prince (Omulangira) Lumansi Kijojo, whose mother was Nakabugo
- Prince (Omulangira) Naluwembe, whose mother was Nakamu
- Prince (Omulangira) Kinyago, whose mother was Nakinyago
- Prince (Omulangira) Wasswa Sseninde, whose mother was Naalongo Kawenyera. (Born before 1644 with twin brother Kato)
- Prince (Omulangira) Kato Geserwa, whose mother was Naalongo Kawenyera. (Born before 1644 with twin brother Waswa)
- Prince (Omulangira) Senninde, whose mother was Naluggwa
- Prince (Omulangira) Gaweserwa, whose mother was Naluggwa
- Prince (Omulangira) Kawuuwa, whose mother was Namayumba
- Prince (Omulangira) Kawagga, whose mother was Namugayi
- Prince (Omulangira) Kazibwe Katakessu, whose mother was Namugayi
- Kabaka Mutebi I, Kabaka of Buganda from 1674 until 1680, whose mother was Namutebi
- Kabaka Juuko Mulwaana, Kabaka of Buganda, between 1680 and 1690, whose mother was Namutebi
- Kabaka Kayemba Kisiki, Kabaka of Buganda, between 1690 and 1704, whose mother was Namutebi
- Prince (Omulangira) Nzigu, whose mother was Nanzigu
- Princess (Omumbejja) Nazibanja, whose mother was Naluggwa.

== The final years ==
He died from a millipede sting to his genitals in 1674. He was buried at Mitw'ebiri. Other credible sources put his burial place at Buteregga, Busiro.

== See also ==
- Kabaka of Buganda

Preceded by Kimbugwe Kamegere	King of Buganda c.1644–c.1674	Succeeded by Mutebi I
