= Mawanda of Buganda =

Ssekabaka Mawanda

Kabaka of Buganda
- Reign: 1738 – 1740
- Predecessor: Kikulwe of Buganda
- Successor: Mwanga I of Buganda
- Born: Uganda
- Died: 1740; Unknown
- Burial: Serinnya Busiro
- Spouse: 1. Nabakyaala Kikome; 2. Nabakyaala Nabunnya; 3. Lady Nabuuso; 4. Lady Nakasinde; 5. Lady Namisango; 6. Lady Nang'onzi; 7. Lady Nankonyo
- Father: Ndawula of Buganda
- Mother: Namasole Nakidde Luyiga

Mawanda was Kabaka (King) of the Kingdom of Buganda, between 1738 and 1740. He was the twenty second (22nd) Kabaka of Buganda.

== Claim to the throne ==
He was the third son of Kabaka Ndawula Nsobya, the 19th Kabaka of Buganda. His mother was Nakidde Luyiga of the Ngo clan, the fourth (4th) of his father's seven (7) wives. Mawanda killed his brother Kabaka Kikulwe Mawuba and seized the throne around 1738. He established his capital at Katakala.

== Reign ==
Mawanda's reign was noted for the expansion of Buganda. He set up his capital at Katakala, to the west of present day Mityana, strategically to serve as a base from which to attack Bunyoro. He annexed the whole region around Lake Wamala, including Bukuya and Kasanda, ultimately extending northwards to Bwanja and Kiboga.

Mawanda set his sights on Kyaggwe, on the Eastern side of Buganda. Having allied himself with Nkutu, a warrior from Lwaje island, who provided a fleet that was utilised in the campaigns of Kyaggwe and Busoga. In assessing his campaigns in Busoga, Kiwanuka states "their victories were sullied by deeds of atrocity, and marked by dreadful slaughter and arson. ... although his successors such as Kyabaggu, may have done more heroic deeds or committed more ghastly acts in Busoga (Suna II) it is Mawanda's name which struck horror among the Basoga of old. Hence the saying Omuganda Mawanda Olumbe Lwekirango Lwaita Mama Nataata. (Mawanda, the nefarious Muganda, slaughtered all our mothers and fathers).

Some of the great officers of state during his reign included;

Name	Clan	Position	Translation
Ssebanaakitta	Mamba (Lungfish)	Katikiro	Chief Minister
Kavuma	Nvuma	Kimbugwe	Second Minister
Mpembe	Lugave (Pangolin)	Kaggo	Governor of Kyaddondo
Lubinga	Lugave (Pangolin)	Kasujju	Governor of Busujju
Matumpaggwa	Nkima (Vervet Monkey)	Kangaawo	Governor of Bulemezi
Mugwanya	Nkima (Vervet Monkey)	Mugema	Governor of Busiro
Mujwege	Ntalaganya (Duiker)	Kitunzi	Governor of Gomba
Manganyi	Ndiga (Sheep)	Katambala	Governor of Butambala

== Married life ==
He is recorded to have married seven (7) wives:

- Naabakyaala Kikome, the Kaddulubaale, daughter of Gabunga, of the Mamba clan
- Naabakyaala Nabunnya Nassaza, daughter of Masembe, of the Nsenene clan
- Nabuuso, daughter of Gunju, of the Butiko clan.
- Nakasinde, daughter of Namwaama, of the Kkobe clan
- Namisango, daughter of Sebugwaawo, of the Musu clan
- Nang'onzi, daughter of Mbaziira, of the Nnyonyi clan
- Nankonyo, daughter of Kagenda, of the Mamba clan

== Issue ==
His children included the following:

- Prince (Omulangira) Mulere, whose mother was Nabunnya. He rebelled against Kabaka Kyabaggu but was defeated and captured. He was killed by being burned alive at Buyinja.
- Prince (Omulangira) Bbengo, whose mother was Kikome. He rebelled against Kabaka Kyabaggu but was defeated and captured. He was killed by being burned alive at Bbuye.
- Prince (Omulangira) Waswa, whose mother was Nakasinde. He was a twin with Nakato.
- Prince (Omulangira) Kirabe, whose mother was Nang'onzi.
- Princess (Omumbejja) Nakato, whose mother was Nakasinde. She was a twin with Waswa.
- Princess (Omumbejja) Namirembe, whose mother was Nankonyo.

== The final years ==
A group of princes in the royal court conspired to murder Kabaka Mawanda in 1740. The group included Prince Mwanga Sebanakitta, who ascended the throne after Kabaka Mawanda's demise. Kabaka Mawanda was buried at Meerera at first, but was exhumed in 1864 and re-buried at Serinnya.

== Quotes ==
"Mawanda had qualities which endeared him to the people. He was brave and fearless."

- MM Semakula Kiwanuka, A History of Buganda, 1971

"Kabaka Mawanda (1730-60) had consolidated the monarchy as the overriding centre of power in Buganda through the administrative reforms he carried out, creating a parallel system of administration, the Bitongole whose officials were directly responsible to the Kabaka and reached down to villages."

- Samwiri Lwanga-Lunyiigo, Mwanga II, 2011

== See also ==
- Kabaka of Buganda

Preceded by Kikulwe Mawuba	King of Buganda c.1738–c.1740	Succeeded by Mwanga Sebanakitta
