= Tebandeke of Buganda =

Ssekabaka Tebandeke Mujambula

Kabaka of Buganda
- Reign: 1704 – 1724
- Predecessor: Kayemba of Buganda
- Successor: Ndawula of Buganda
- Born: Uganda
- Died: 1724; Bundeke, Busiro
- Burial: Bundeke, Busiro
- Spouse: 1. Naabakyaala Nakyaazirana; 2. Lady Balangazza; 2. Lady Nabali; 3. Lady Nabaziika; 3. Lady Nakawunde
- Issue: Prince Jjuma Katebe
- Father: Mutebi I of Buganda
- Mother: Namasole Nabukalu

Tebandeke Mujambula, sometimes spelt as Ttebandeke Mujambula, was Kabaka of the Kingdom of Buganda between 1704 and 1724. He was the 18th Kabaka of Buganda.

== Claim to the throne ==
The turbulence of Tebandeke's reign is attributable to his mental derangement and his violent nature.

— MM Semakula Kiwanuka.

He was the second son of Kabaka Mutebi I, who reigned between 1674 and 1680. His mother was Nabukalu of the Lugave clan, the second (2nd) of his father's five (5) wives. He ascended to the throne after the death of his uncle, around 1704. He established his capital at Bundeke.

During his reign, Tebandeke's children were faced with a severe illness and he sent for oracles to establish the cause of the malady. The oracles prescribed a ritual, which the Kabaka performed and the children survived. For this, the oracles demanded a high price for their services and shamed Tebandeke with public demands for their payment. The mortified Kabaka had the oracles put to death and their temples burned down. The Kabaka however was driven mad and ran into the forest.

== Married life ==
He married five (5) wives:

- Naabakyaala Nakyaazirana, Kaddulubaale, daughter of Sensalire, of the Njovu clan
- Balangazza, daughter of Sekayiba, of the Mbogo clan
- Nabali, daughter of Sempala, of the Ffumbe clan
- Nabaziika, sister of Nakuwande, and daughter of Mugema, of the Nkima clan
- Nakuwande, sister of Nabazika, and daughter of Mugema, of the nkima clan

== Issue ==
He is recorded to have fathered only one child:

- Prince (Omulangira) Juma Katebe, whose mother was Nakyaazirana. He was excluded from the succession by Kabaka Ndawula Nsobya.

== The final years ==
Kabaka Tebandeke died at the Kanyakasasa Palace, Bundeke. He was buried at Bundeke.

== See also ==
- Kabaka of Buganda

Preceded by Kayemba Kisiki	King of Buganda c.1704–c.1724	Succeeded by Ndawula Nsobya
