= Kayemba of Buganda =

Ssekabaka Kayemba Kisiki

Kabaka of Buganda
- Reign: 1690 – 1704
- Predecessor: Juuko of Buganda
- Successor: Tebandeke of Buganda
- Born: Uganda
- Died: 1704; Unknown
- Burial: Nabulagala, Busiro
- Spouse: 1. Lady Nabbanja; 2. Lady Nakku
- Father: Kateregga of Buganda
- Mother: Namasole Namutebi

Kayemba Kisiki was the 17th Kabaka (king) of the Kingdom of Buganda between 1690 and 1704.

== Claim to the throne ==
He was the third son of Sekabaka Kateregga Kamegere, who reigned between 1644 and 1674. His mother was Namutebi of the Mmamba clan, who was the eighth of his father's nine wives. He ascended the throne upon the death of his elder brother. He established his palace at Lunnyo, near the city of Entebbe, close to where the current State House is stands today.

== Married life ==
He married two wives:

- Nabbanja, daughter of Kasujja, of the Ngeye clan
- Nakku, daughter of Walusimbi, of the Ffumbe clan

== Issue ==
He had three sons:

- Prince (Omulangira) Sematimba, whose mother was Nabbanja
- Prince (Omulangira) Wakayima, whose mother was Nabbanja
- Prince (Omulangira) Kawumpuli, whose mother was Nakku. He was born limbless and consequently excluded from the succession.

== The final years ==
Kabaka Kayemba died at an adult age around 1704. He was buried at Nabulagala in Busiro.

== See also ==
- Kabaka of Buganda

Preceded by Juuko	King of Buganda c.1690–c.1704	Succeeded by Tebandeke
