= Kikulwe of Buganda =

Ssekabaka Kikulwe Mawuba

Kabaka of Buganda
- Reign: 1736 – 1738
- Predecessor: Kagulu of Buganda
- Successor: Mawanda of Buganda
- Born: Uganda
- Died: 1738; Unknown
- Burial: Kaliiti, Busiro
- Spouse: 1. Lady Nabiddo; 2. Lady Najjuka; 3. Lady Nakabugo; 4.Lady Namatovu; 5. Nabakyaala Nantume Nanzigu
- Father: Ndawula of Buganda
- Mother: Namasole Nakikulwe Namirembe

Kikulwe Mawuba was Kabaka of the Kingdom of Buganda between 1736 and 1738. He was the twenty first (21st) Kabaka of Buganda.

== Claim to the throne ==
He was the fourth (4th) son of Kabaka Ndawula Nsobya, the nineteenth (19th) Kabaka of Buganda. His mother was Nakikulwe Namirembe, the third (3rd) of his father's seven (7) wives. He ascended the throne after the death of his elder brother, Kabaka Kagulu Tebukywereke. He established his capital at Kibibi. He is remembered as a malevolent ruler.

== Married life ==
He is reported to have married five (5) wives:

- Nabiddo, daughter of Luba, of the Nyonyi clan
- Najjuka, daughter of Gunju, of the Butiko clan
- Nakabugo, daughter of Mugema, of the Nkima clan
- Namatovu, daughter of Kajubi, of the Nsenene clan
- Naabakyaala Nantume Nanzigu, daughter of Sekayiba, of the Mbogo clan

== Issue ==
He is recorded to have fathered at least nine children:

- Prince (Omulangira) Madangu, whose mother was Nakabugo
- Princess (Omumbejja) Mpalikitenda, whose mother was Nabiddo
- Prince (Omulangira) Maganda, whose mother was Nakabugo
- Prince (Omulangira) Ggobango, whose mother was Nakabugo
- Prince (Omulangira) Segaamweenge, whose mother was Nakabugo
- Princess (Omumbejja) Zansanze, whose mother was Nakabugo
- Princess (Omumbejja) Nabaloga, whose mother was Nakabugo
- Prince (Omulangira) Ngobe, whose mother was Namatovu
- Prince (Omulangira) Gomottoka, whose mother was Namatovu - He issued sons 1. Prince (Omulangira) Mpadwa kussambiza 2. Prince (Omulangira) Kolobola 3. Prince (Omulangira) Genza 4. Prince (Omulangira) Kisala Ggolooba 5. Prince (Omulangira) Luwarira 6. Prince (Omulangira) Kimu Other sons were sold into slavery by reigning kings to deter them from claiming the thrown.

== The final years ==
Kabaka Kikulwe was murdered by his elder half-brother, Prince Mawanda Sebanakitta, who seized the throne around 1738. Ssekabaka Kikulwe is buried at Kaliiti, Busiro.

== See also ==
- Kabaka of Buganda

Preceded by Kagulu Tebukywereke	King of Buganda c.1736–c.1738	Succeeded by Mawanda Sebanakitta
