= Juuko of Buganda =

Ssekabaka Juuko Mulwaana

Kabaka of Buganda
- Reign: 1680 – 1690
- Predecessor: Mutebi I of Buganda
- Successor: Kayemba of Buganda
- Born: Uganda
- Died: 1690; Unknown
- Burial: Bujuuko, Busiro
- Spouse: 1. Lady Nabatanzi; 2. Lady Nakimera; 3. Lady Nakisozi; 4. Lady Nalunga; 5. Lady Nandawula; 5. Lady Nantume
- Father: Kateregga of Buganda
- Mother: Namasole Namutebi

Juuko Mulwaana was the 16th Kabaka between 1680 and 1690.

== Claim to the throne ==
He was the second son of Kabaka Kateregga Kamegere, Kabaka of Buganda between 1644 and 1674. His mother was Namutebi of the Mmamba clan, the eighth wife of his father. He ascended the throne upon the demise of his elder brother around 1680. He established his capital at Ngalamye. He is remembered as a malevolent ruler.

== Married life ==
He married six (6) wives:

- Nabatanzi, daughter of Sebugulu, of the Lugave clan
- Nakimera, daughter of Kalanzi, of the Nsenene clan
- Nakisozi, daughter of Sekayiba, of the Mbogo clan
- Nalunga, daughter of Semaluulu, of the Nvuma clan
- Nandawula Kabengano, daughter of Nkata, of the Nsenene clan
- Nantume, daughter of Sekayiba, of the Mbogo clan

== Issue ==
He fathered many children including:

- Prince (Omulangira) Batanzi, whose mother was Nabatanzi
- Prince (Omulangira) Kimera, whose mother was Nakimera
- Prince (Omulangira) Kisozi, whose mother was Nakisozi
- Prince (Omulangira) Lumweeno, whose mother was Nalunga
- Kabaka Ndawula Nsobya, Kabaka of Buganda, who reigned between 1724 and 1734, whose mother was Nandawula Kabengano
- Prince (Omulangira) Kasagazi, whose mother was Nantume
- Prince (Omulangira) Kyekaka.
- Princess (Omumbejja) Kagere

== The final years ==
He died around 1690. No information is available as to the place or cause of his death. He is buried at Bujuuko, Busiro.

== See also ==
- Kabaka of Buganda

| Preceded by Mutebi I | King of Buganda c.1680–c.1690 | Succeeded by Kayemba Kisiki |
