= History of Buganda =

Flag of Buganda

The history of Buganda is that of the Buganda kingdom of the Baganda people, the largest of the traditional kingdoms in present-day Uganda. Muwawa refers to the pre-kingdom territory before Kabaka Kintu unified the clans, leading to the formation of the Kingdom of Buganda, which is the modern-day name for the region and its people.

== Pre-colonial and colonial Buganda ==
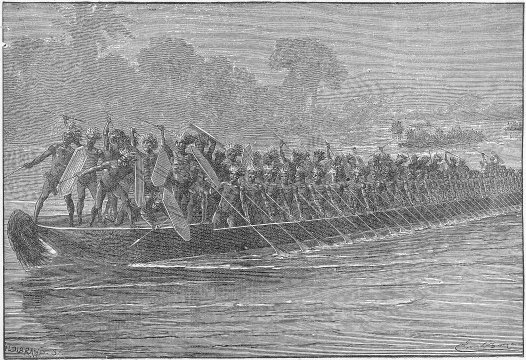
Buganda effectively controlled Lake Victoria using fleets of war canoes from the 1840s

Loyalty to their King, Country and Institutions endowed the Baganda with remarkable valour and tenacity in war.

— J.P. Thoonen.

It is very likely that the Buganda state is much more ancient than has previously been thought. Buganda began as a small principality in the north of Lake Victoria in what is now Busiro County.

A political structure of some sort, small in scale and mainly ritual in function, may be taken to have existed in northern Busiro, where the ancient shrines are clustered, at a time far beyond the reach of historical tradition...the rituals of Ganda kingship are both too elaborate and too archaic in character to have been evolved within the past few centuries.

Buganda grew rapidly in power in the eighteenth and nineteenth century becoming the dominant kingdom in the region. Buganda started to expand in the 1840s, and used fleets of war canoes to establish "a kind of imperial supremacy" over Lake Victoria and the surrounding regions. Subjugating weaker peoples for cheap labor, Buganda grew into a powerful "embryonic empire". The first direct contact with Europeans was established in 1862, when British explorers John Hanning Speke and Captain Sir Richard Francis Burton entered Buganda and according to their reports, the kingdom was highly organized.

Muteesa I of Buganda, who had been visited by explorers, like John Hanning Speke, James Augustus Grant and Henry Morton Stanley, invited the Church Missionary Society to Buganda. One of the missionaries from the Church Missionary Society was Alexander Murdoch Mackay. Muteesa I never converted to any religion, despite numerous attempts. In 1884, Muteesa died and his son Mwanga II took over. Most of what is known about Muteesa comes from primary sources from various Kiganda researchers and some foreign explorers, notably John Hanning Speke, and the Church Missionary Society. Mwanga was overthrown numerous times, but was reinstated. Mwanga signed a treaty with Captain Lord Lugard in 1892, giving Buganda the status of protectorate under the authority of the British East Africa Company. The British saw this territory as a prized possession.

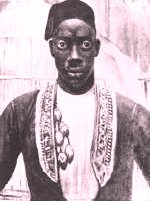
Muteesa I was Kabaka from October 1856 until his death in 1884.

The twentieth-century influence of the Baganda in Uganda has reflected the impact of eighteenth- and nineteenth-century developments. A series of Kabakas amassed military and political power by killing rivals to the throne, abolishing hereditary positions of authority, and exacting higher taxes from their subjects. Ganda armies also seized territory held by Bunyoro, the neighboring kingdom to the west. Ganda cultural norms also prevented the establishment of a royal clan by assigning the children of the Kabaka to the clan of their mother. At the same time, this practice allowed the Kabaka to marry into any clan in the society.

One of the most powerful appointed advisers of the Kabaka was the Katikkiro, who was in charge of the kingdom's administrative and judicial systems – effectively serving as both prime minister and chief justice. The Katikkiro and other powerful ministers formed an inner circle of advisers who could summon lower-level chiefs and other appointed advisers to confer on policy matters. By the end of the nineteenth century, the Kabaka had replaced many clan heads with appointed officials and claimed the title "head of all the clans".

The sophisticated structure of governance of the Baganda so impressed British officials, but political leaders in neighboring Bunyoro were not receptive to British officials who arrived with Baganda escorts. Buganda became the centrepiece of the new protectorate, and many Baganda were able to take advantage of opportunities provided by schools and businesses in their area. Baganda civil servants also helped administer other ethnic groups, and Uganda's early history was written from the perspective of the Baganda and the colonial officials who became accustomed to dealing with them. At independence in 1962, Buganda had achieved the highest standard of living and the highest literacy rate in the country.

== Power politics before Ugandan independence ==
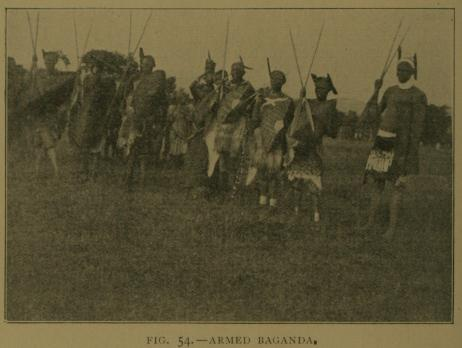
Armed war-party of Baganda

The prospect of elections in the run up to independence caused a sudden proliferation of new political parties. This development alarmed the old-guard leaders within the Uganda kingdoms, because they realized that the centre of power would be at the national level. The spark that ignited wider opposition to Governor Sir Andrew Cohen's reforms was a 1953 speech in London in which the secretary of state for colonies referred to the possibility of a federation of the three East African territories (Kenya, Uganda and Tanganyika), similar to that established in central Africa.

Many Ugandans were aware of the Central African Federation of Rhodesia and Nyasaland (later Zimbabwe, Zambia, and Malawi) and its domination by white settler interests. Ugandans deeply feared the prospect of an East African federation dominated by the white settlers of Kenya, which was then in the midst of the bitter Mau Mau Uprising. They had vigorously resisted a similar suggestion by the 1930 Hilton Young Commission. Confidence in Cohen vanished just as the governor was preparing to urge Buganda to recognize that its special status would have to be sacrificed in the interests of a new and larger nation-state.

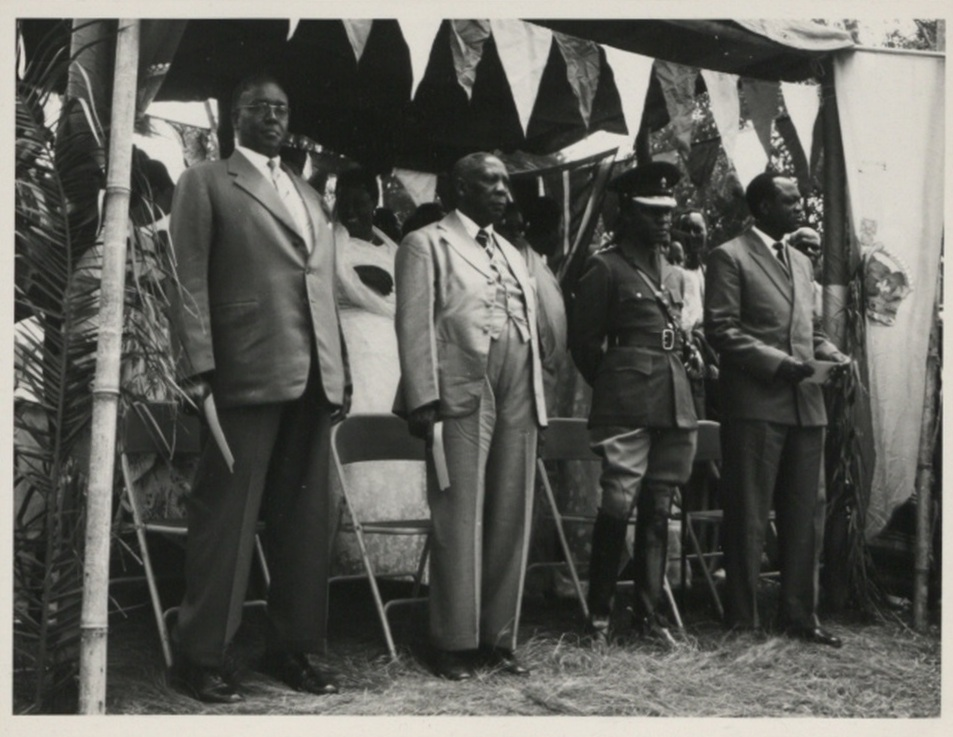
The kings of Uganda around 1960; Mutesa II of Buganda is second from right

Kabaka Mutesa II of Buganda, nicknamed "King Freddie", who had been regarded by his subjects as uninterested in their welfare, now refused to cooperate with Cohen's plan for an integrated Buganda. Instead, he demanded that Buganda be separated from the rest of the protectorate and transferred to Foreign Office jurisdiction. Cohen's response to this crisis was to deport the kabaka to a comfortable exile in London. His forced departure made the kabaka an instant martyr in the eyes of the Baganda, whose latent separatism and anticolonial sentiments set off a storm of protest. Cohen's action had backfired, and he could find no one among the Baganda prepared or able to mobilize support for his schemes. After two frustrating years of unrelenting Ganda hostility and obstruction, Cohen was forced to reinstate Kabaka Freddie.

The negotiations leading to the kabaka's return had an outcome similar to the negotiations of Commissioner Johnston in 1900; although appearing to satisfy the British, they were a resounding victory for the Baganda. Cohen secured the kabaka's agreement not to oppose independence within the larger Uganda framework. Not only was the kabaka reinstated in return, but for the first time since 1889, the monarch was given the power to appoint and dismiss his chiefs (Buganda government officials) instead of acting as a mere figurehead while they conducted the affairs of government.

The kabaka's new power was cloaked in the misleading claim that he would be only a "constitutional monarch," while in fact he was a leading player in deciding how Uganda would be governed. A new grouping of Baganda calling themselves "the King's Friends" rallied to the kabaka's defense. They were conservative, fiercely loyal to Buganda as a kingdom, and willing to entertain the prospect of participation in an independent Uganda only if it were headed by the kabaka. Baganda politicians who did not share this vision or who were opposed to the "King's Friends" found themselves branded as the "King's Enemies," which meant political and social ostracism.

The major exception to this rule were the Roman Catholic Baganda who had formed their own party, the Democratic Party (DP), led by Benedicto Kiwanuka. Many Catholics had felt excluded from the Protestant-dominated establishment in Buganda ever since Frederick Lugard's Maxim machine gun had turned the tide in 1892. The kabaka had to be Protestant, and he was invested in a coronation ceremony modeled on that of British monarchs (who are invested by the Church of England's Archbishop of Canterbury) that took place at the main Protestant church. Religion and politics were equally inseparable in the other kingdoms throughout Uganda. The DP had Catholic as well as other adherents and was probably the best organized of all the parties preparing for elections. It had printing presses and the backing of the popular newspaper, Munno, which was published at the St. Mary's Kisubi mission.

Elsewhere in Uganda, the emergence of the kabaka as a political force provoked immediate hostility. Political parties and local interest groups were riddled with divisions and rivalries, but they shared one concern: they were determined not to be dominated by Buganda. In 1960 a political organizer from Lango, Milton Obote, seized the initiative and formed a new party, the Uganda People's Congress (UPC), as a coalition of all those outside the Roman Catholic-dominated DP who opposed Buganda hegemony.

The steps Cohen had initiated to bring about the independence of a unified Uganda state had led to a polarization between factions from Buganda and those opposed to its domination. Buganda's population in 1959 was 2 million, out of Uganda's total of 6 million. Even discounting the many non-Baganda resident in Buganda, there were at least 1 million people who owed allegiance to the kabaka – too many to be overlooked or shunted aside, but too few to dominate the country as a whole. At the London Conference of 1960, it was obvious that Buganda autonomy and a strong unitary government were incompatible, but no compromise emerged, and the decision on the form of government was postponed. The British announced that elections would be held in March 1961 for "responsible government," the next-to-last stage of preparation before the formal granting of independence. It was assumed that those winning the election would gain valuable experience in office, preparing them for the probable responsibility of governing after independence.

In Buganda the "King's Friends" urged a total boycott of the election because their attempts to secure promises of future autonomy had been rebuffed. Consequently, when the voters went to the polls throughout Uganda to elect eighty-two National Assembly members, in Buganda only the Roman Catholic supporters of the DP braved severe public pressure and voted, capturing twenty of Buganda's twenty-one allotted seats. This artificial situation gave the DP a majority of seats, although they had a minority of 416,000 votes nationwide versus 495,000 for the UPC. Benedicto Kiwanuka became the new chief minister of Uganda.

Shocked by the results, the Baganda separatists, who formed a political party called Kabaka Yekka, had second thoughts about the wisdom of their election boycott. They quickly welcomed the recommendations of a British commission that proposed a future federal form of government. According to these recommendations, Buganda would enjoy a measure of internal autonomy if it participated fully in the national government. For its part, the UPC was equally anxious to eject its DP rivals from government before they became entrenched. Obote reached an understanding with Kabaka Freddie and the KY, accepting Buganda's special federal relationship and even a provision by which the kabaka could appoint Buganda's representatives to the National Assembly, in return for a strategic alliance to defeat the DP. The kabaka was also promised the largely ceremonial position of head of state of Uganda, which was of great symbolic importance to the Baganda.

This marriage of convenience between the UPC and the KY made inevitable the defeat of the DP interim administration. In the aftermath of the April 1962 final election leading up to independence, Uganda's national parliament consisted of forty-three UPC delegates, twenty-four KY delegates, and twenty-four DP delegates. The new UPC-KY coalition led Uganda into independence in October 1962, with Obote as prime minister and the kabaka as head of state.

== After independence ==
Uganda achieved independence on 9 October 1962 with the Kabaka of Buganda, Sir Edward Mutesa II, as its first president. However, the monarchy of Buganda and much of its autonomy was revoked, along with that of the other four Ugandan kingdoms.

At this time, the kingship controversy was the most important issue in Ugandan politics. Although there were four kingdoms, the real question was how much control over Buganda the central government should have. The power of the king as a uniting symbol for the Baganda became apparent following his deportation by the protectorate government in 1953. When negotiations for independence threatened the autonomous status of Buganda, leading notables organized a political party to protect the king. The issue was successfully presented as a question of survival of the Baganda as a separate nation because the position of the king had been central to Buganda's precolonial culture. On that basis, defense of the kingship attracted overwhelming support in local Buganda government elections, which were held just before independence. To oppose the king in Buganda at that time would have meant political suicide.

In 1967, the prime Minister Apollo Milton Obote changed the 1966 constitution and turned the state into a republic. On 24 May 1966 the federal Ugandan army attacked the royal compound or Lubiri in Mmengo. At the time, Uganda’s first president and king of Buganda Kabaka Muteesa II fled his palace at Mengo amid a downpour. With his escorts, they escaped to Burundi and then flew to Britain, where he eventually died. The Ugandan army turned the king's palace into their barracks and the Buganda parliament building into their headquarters. It was difficult to know how many Baganda continued to support the kingship and how intensely they felt about it because no one could express support openly.

On 25 January 1971, Obote was deposed in a coup by the head of the army, Idi Amin. After a brief flirtation with restoration, Idi Amin also refused to consider restoration of the kingdoms. By the 1980s, Obote had once again returned to power, and more than half of all Baganda had never lived under their king. The Conservative Party, a marginal group led by the last man to serve as Buganda's prime minister under a king, contested the 1980 elections but received little support.

In 1986, the National Resistance Movement (NRM), led by Yoweri Museveni, would take power in Uganda. While fighting a guerrilla war against Obote, NRM leaders could not be sure that the Baganda would accept their government or their Ten-Point Programme. The NRA was ambivalent in its response to this issue. On the one hand, until its final year, the insurgency against the Obote regime had been conducted entirely in Buganda, involved a large number of Baganda fighters, and depended heavily on the revulsion most Baganda felt for Obote and the UPC.

On the other hand, many Baganda who had joined the NRA and received a political education in the Ten-Point Programme rejected ethnic loyalty as the basis of political organization. Nevertheless, though a matter of dispute, many Ugandans reported that Museveni promised in public, near the end of the guerrilla struggle, to restore the kingship and to permit Ronald Mutebi, the heir apparent, to become king. Many other Ugandans opposed the restoration just as strongly, primarily for the political advantages it would give Buganda.

Controversy erupted a few months after the NRM takeover in 1986, when the heads of each of the clans in Buganda organized a public campaign for the restoration of the kingship, the return of the Buganda parliament building (which the NRA had continued to use as the army headquarters), and permission for Mutebi to return to Uganda. Over the next month, the government struggled to regain the political initiative from the clan heads. First, in July 1986 the prime minister, Samson Kisekka – a Muganda – told people at a public rally in Buganda to stop this "foolish talk".

Without explanation, the government abruptly ordered the cancellation of celebrations to install the heir of another kingdom a week later. Nevertheless, the newspapers reported more demands for the return of Mutebi by Buganda clan elders. The cabinet then issued a statement conceding the intensity of public interest but insisting the question of restoring kings was up to the forthcoming Constitutional Assembly and not within the powers of the interim government. Then, three weeks later, the NRM issued its own carefully worded statement calling supporters of restoration "disgruntled opportunists purporting to be monarchists" and threatening to take action against anyone who continued to agitate on this issue.

At the same time, the president agreed to meet with the clan elders, even though that gave a fresh public boost to the controversy. Then, in a surprise move, the president convinced Mutebi to return home secretly in mid-August 1986, presenting the clan elders with a fait accompli. Ten days later, the government arrested a number of Baganda, whom it accused of a plot to overthrow the government and restore the king. But while Museveni managed to take the wind from the sails of Buganda nationalism, he was forced to go to inordinate lengths to defuse public feeling, and nothing was settled. The kingship issue was likely to re-emerge with equal intensity and unpredictable consequences when the draft for a new constitution was presented for public discussion.

The monarchy was finally restored in 1993, with the son of Mutesa II, Ronald Muwenda Mutebi II as its Kabaka. Buganda is now a constitutional monarchy, with a parliament called Lukiiko that sits in parliamentary buildings called Bulange. The Lukiiko has a sergeant-at-arms, speaker and provisional seats for the royals, 18 county chiefs, cabinet ministers, 52 clan heads, invited guests and a gallery. The Kabaka only attends two sessions in a year; first when he is opening the first session of the year and second, when he is closing the last session of the year.
