= Mutebi I of Buganda =

Ssekabaka Mutebi I

Kabaka of Buganda
- Reign: 1674 – 1680
- Predecessor: Kateregga of Buganda
- Successor: Juuko of Buganda
- Born: Uganda
- Died: 1680; Mbalwa, Kira Town
- Burial: Mbalwa, Kira Town
- Spouse: 1.Lady Nabitalo; 2. Lady Nabukalu; 3. Lady Naluyima; 4. Lady Namawuba; 5. Lady Nampiima
- Father: Kateregga of Buganda
- Mother: Namasole Namutebi

Mutebi I was the 15th Kabaka of the Kingdom of Buganda between 1674 and 1680.

== Claim to the throne ==
He was the son of Sekabaka Kateregga Kamegere, who reigned between 1644 and 1674. His mother was Namutebi of the Mmamba clan, the eighth wife of his father. He ascended the throne following the death of his father in 1674. He established his capital at Muguluka. He is remembered as a malevolent ruler.

== Married life ==
He married five (5) wives:

- Nabitalo, daughter of Walusimbi, of the Ffumbe clan
- Nabukalu, daughter of Ndugwa, of the Lugave clan
- Naluyima, daughter of Nakatanza, of the Lugave clan
- Namawuba, daughter of Natiigo, of the Lugave clan
- Nampiima, daughter of Kibale, of the Mpewo clan.

== Issue ==
He had seven (7) sons:

- Prince (Omulangira) Lukenge, whose mother was Nabitalo
- Kabaka Tebandeke Mujambula, Kabaka of Buganda, who reigned between 1704 and 1724, whose mother was Nabukalu
- Prince (Omulangira) Mpiima, whose mother was Nampiima
- Prince (Omulangira) Kayima, whose mother was Naluyima
- Prince (Omulangira) Mawuba, whose mother was Namawuba
- Prince (Omulangira) Mukama, whose mother was Namawuba
- Prince (Omulangira) Matumbwe, whose mother was Namawuba

== The final years ==
He died at Mbalwa and was buried there. Other credible sources put his burial place at Kongojje, Busiro.

== See also ==
- Kabaka of Buganda

| Preceded by Kateregga Kamegere | King of Buganda c.1674–c.1680 | Succeeded by Juuko Mulwaana |
