= Namuggala of Buganda =

Ssekabaka Namuggala

Kabaka of Buganda
- Reign: 1741 – 1750
- Predecessor: Mwanga I of Buganda
- Successor: Kyabaggu of Buganda
- Born: Uganda
- Died: 1750; Nalubugo Hill
- Burial: Muyomba, Busiro
- Spouse: 1. Nabakyaala Basuuta; 2. Lady Najjuka; 3. Lady Nakangu; 4. Lady Nalubowa; 5. Lady Nalunga; 6. Lady Nawaguma
- Father: Prince Musanje Golooba
- Mother: Namasole Nabulya Naluggwa

Namuggala was Kabaka of the Kingdom of Buganda, between 1741 and 1750. He was the twenty-fourth (24th) Kabaka of Buganda. He is remembered as a lovable and merciful ruler.

== Claim to the throne ==
He was the second son of Prince Musanje Golooba. His mother was Nabulya Naluggwa of the Ndiga clan, the second of his father's wives. He ascended to the throne upon the death of his elder brother, Kabaka Mwanga I Sebanakitta, in 1741. He established his capital at Nansana.

== Reign ==
Namugala had a short reign. He was more interested in the pursuit of the pleasures of life than state affairs. His CHief Minister (Katikiro) was Kagali of the Nvuma clan.

Some of the great officers of state during his reign included;

Name	Position	Translation
Kagali	Katikiro	Chief Minister
Lubinga	Kasujju	Governor of Busujju
Kambugu	Kangaawo	Governor of Bulemezi
Mugwanya	Mugema	Governor of Busiro
Kabale	Kitunzi	Governor of Gomba
Butekkanya	Katambala	Governor of Butambala

His stubborn refusal to heed his brother Prince Kyabaggu's request to execute Dibbongo ignited a conflict between the two that eventually led to his abdication.

== Married life ==
He is recorded to have married six (6) wives:

- Naabakyaala Basuuta, the Kaddulubaale, daughter Masembe, of the Nsenene clan
- Najjuka, daughter of Gunju, of the Butiko clan
- Nakangu, daughter of Kagenda, of the Mamba clan
- Nalubowa, daughter of Seggiriinya, of the Ngo (Leopard) clan.
- Nalunga, daughter of Terwewalwa, of the Nvuma clan.
- Nawaguma, daughter of Kisuule, of the Njovu clan

== Issue ==
He is recorded to have fathered three sons:

- Prince (Omulangira) Kateregga, whose mother was Basuuta
- Prince (Omulangira) Ngabo, whose mother was Najjuka
- Prince (Omulangira) Kiboli, whose mother was Nawaguma

== The final years ==
His genial nature made him a more acceptable candidate to men who still remembered the tyranny of Kagulu’s rule.

— MM Semakula Kiwanuka.

Kabaka Namuggala abdicated in favor of his younger brother, Kyabaggu Kabinuli, around 1750. He died, following an accidental fall on Nalubugo Hill, after his abdication. He was buried at Muyomba, Busiro.

== See also ==
- Kabaka of Buganda
- Nansana

Preceded by Mwanga I	King of Buganda c.1741–c.1750	Succeeded by Kyabaggu
