= Kagulu Hill =

Hill in the Eastern Region of Uganda

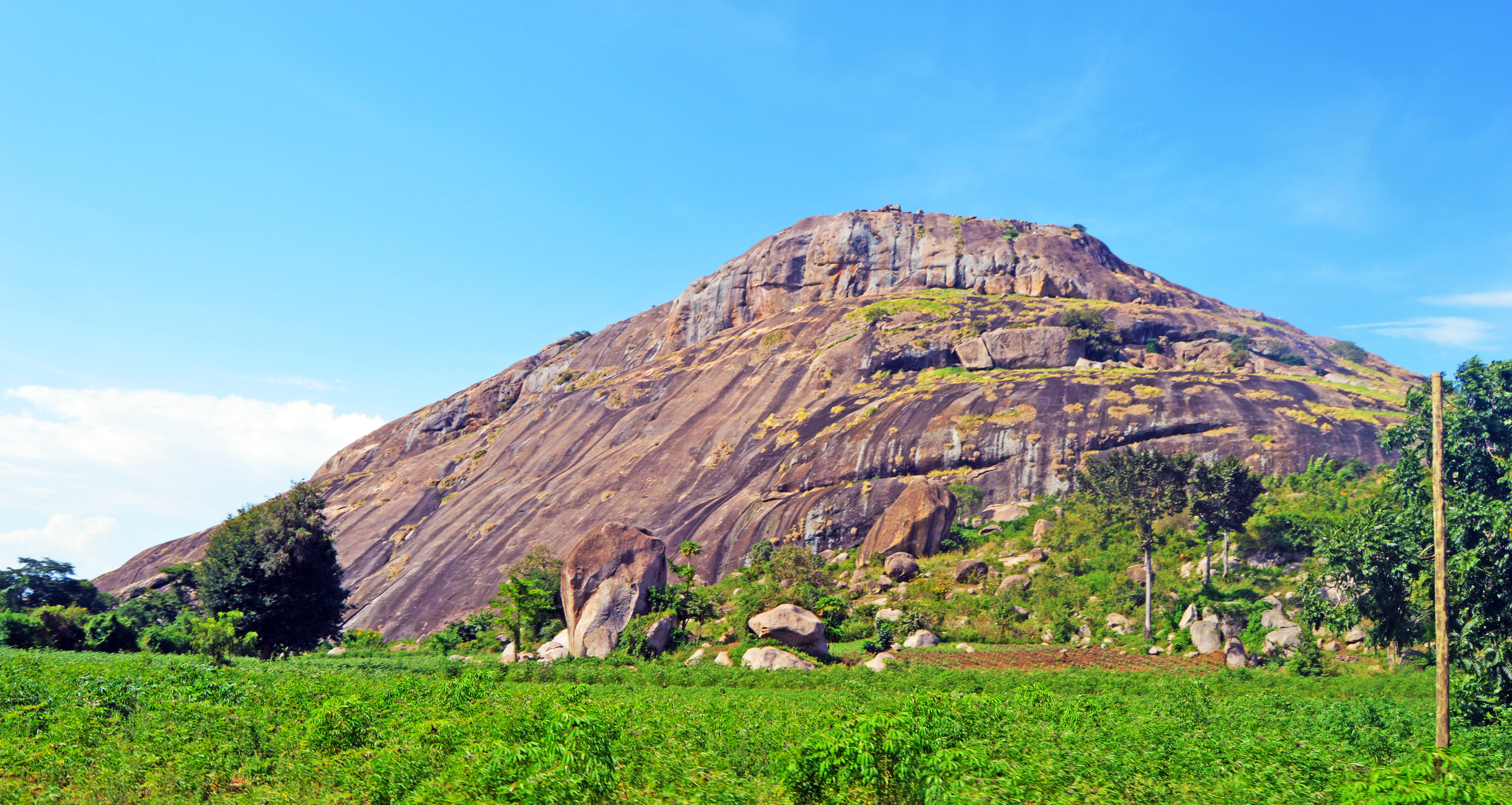

Highest point
- Elevation: 1,067 m (3,501 ft)
- Coordinates: 01°13′15″N 33°19′50″E

Geography
- Location within Uganda
- Location: Kagulu, Buyende District, Uganda

Geology
- Last eruption: 22/09/2000

Climbing
- First ascent: Eria Kasozi Bukenya
- Easiest route: Jinja road

Kagulu Hill, also Kagulu Rock, is a rocky prominence that rises 3,500 feet (1,067 m), above sea level, in the Eastern Region of Uganda.

== Location ==
The hill is located in Buyende county, Buyende District, in Uganda's Eastern Region. This is about 42 kilometres (26 mi) north-east of Kamuli, the nearest town.

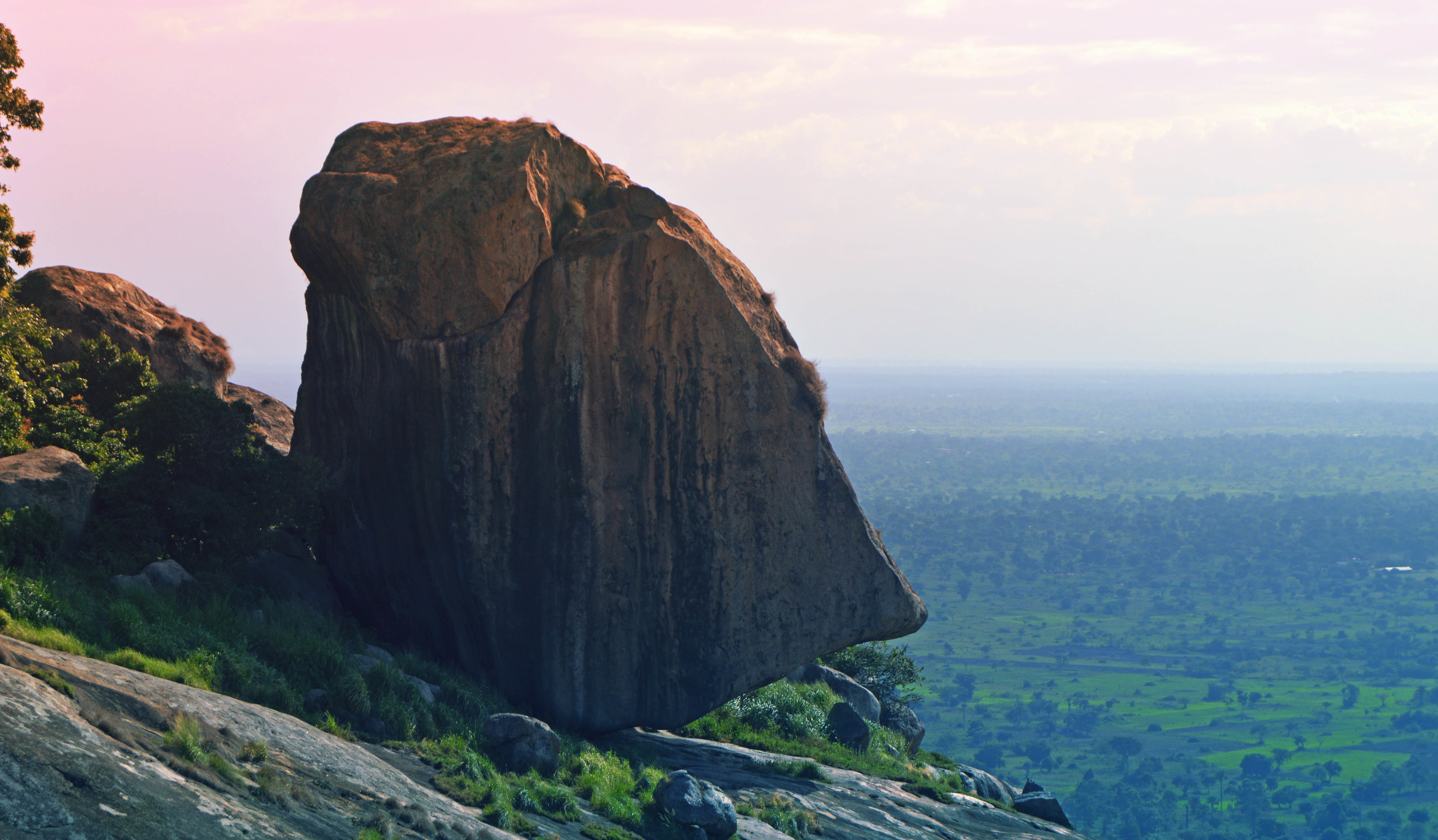
Kagulu hill

Kagulu is approximately 106 kilometres (66 mi) north of Jinja, the largest city in the Busoga sub-region. The coordinates of Kagulu Hill are 01°13'15.0"N, 33°19'50.0"E (Latitude:1.220833; Longitude:33.330556).

== History ==
Oral tradition holds that the Basoga migrated to present-day Busoga from the east, circa 1650 AD. The original Basoga are said to have arrived across Lake Kyoga and settled in the caves at the bottom of this hill. The Basoga have traditional caretakers who live on the hill, going back many centuries.

The caves were discovered in 1686, during the reign of Olimi I of Bunyoro Kitara. When Bunyoro conquered Busoga, Prince Mukama Namutukula of Bunyoro made the Kagulu caves his personal residence. The location where Namutukula landed by boat, lies about 10 kilometres (6 mi) away, on the shores of Lake Kyoga. To the west of Kagulu Hill, are six smaller hills in a line namely; Kagwese, Mawaale, Mpanga, Nakyeere, Bukolimo and Butadewo.

== Tourism ==
Due to the panoramic view from the top, the rocky hill has become a tourist attraction in the 21st century. From the top of Kagulu Hill, one can view the Victoria Nile, where it enters Lake Kyoga. There is a waterfall, where water emanates from the rocks and cascades down the hill. Exploring the caves at the bottom of the hill offers another activity to visiting travelers.

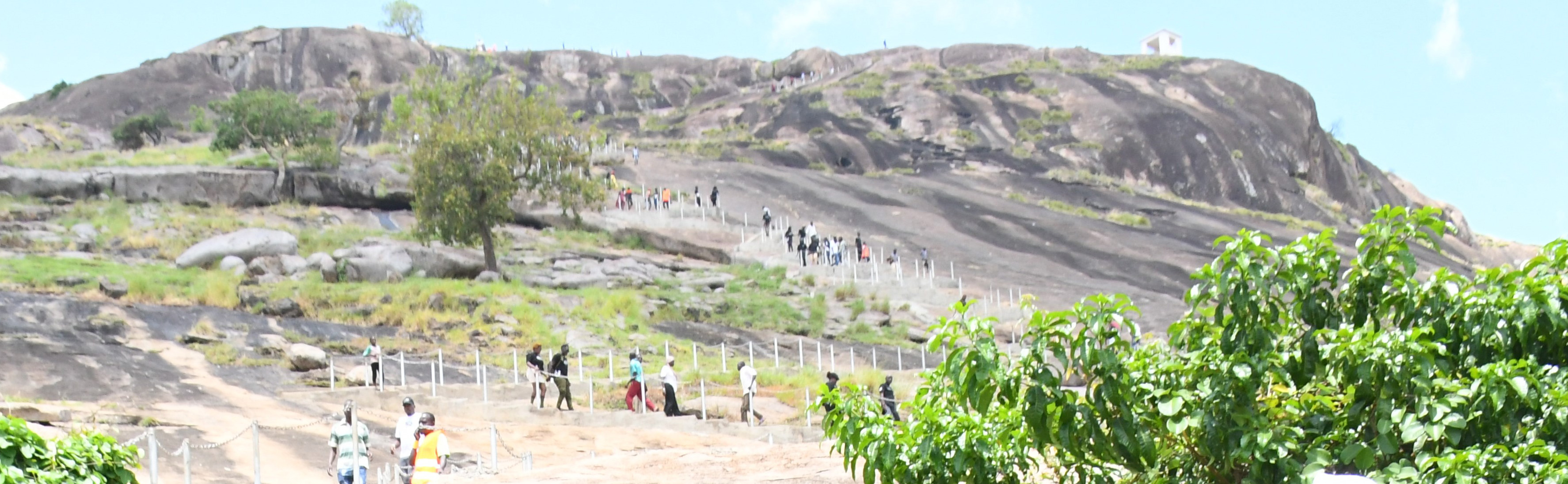
Kagulu Rock.jpg

== See also ==
- Kyabazinga of Busoga
- Kaliro
- Busoga
