= Kagulu of Buganda =

Ssekabaka Kagulu Ntambi Tebukywereke

Kabaka of Buganda
- Reign: 1734 – 1736
- Predecessor: Ndawula of Buganda
- Successor: Kikulwe of Buganda
- Born: Uganda
- Died: 1736; Lake Nalubaale
- Burial: Bbuga, Busiro
- Spouse: Name unknown
- Father: Ndawula of Buganda
- Mother: Namasole Naggujja

Kagulu Ntambi Tebukywereke was Kabaka of the Kingdom of Buganda, between 1734 and 1736. He was the twentieth (20th) Kabaka of Buganda.

== Claim to the throne ==
He was the eldest son of Kabaka Ndawula Nsobya, Kabaka of Buganda between 1724 and 1734. His mother was Naggujja of the Njovu clan, the second (2nd) of his father's seven (7) wives. He ascended to the throne upon the death of his father. He established his capital at Bulizo. He is remembered as a particularly malevolent ruler.

== Issue ==
- Prince (Omulangira) Kayima Ssekindi
- Prince (Omulangira) Sematimba. Prince Sematimba had a son; Prince (Omulangira) Kayemba Sekitamu. Prince Sekitamu, in turn had two sons: (a) Prince (Omulangira) Lubugu and (b) Prince (Omulangira) Sekitamu. He had a son: (A) Prince (Omulangira) Name Unknown. The unknown prince in turn had a son: Prince (Omulangira) Kakindu. Prince Kakindu died before 1939, having had a son; Prince (Omulangira) Isaaka Yali-Aseka.

== The final years ==
Kabaka Kagulu Tebukywereke was deposed by his sister, Princess Ndege, the Nassolo. He fled to Buto. He was killed by drowning in Lake Nalubaale, on the orders of Nassolo. His body was retrieved and buried at Bbuga, Busiro.

== Quotes ==
"… his dominant trait was lack of respect for men. His despotic rule and the barbarous treatment of the men who worked in the capital caused unrest and discontent because it affected a very large section of the community."

- MM Semakula Kiwanuka, A History of Buganda, 1971

== See also ==
- Kabaka of Buganda

Preceded by Ndawula Nsobya	King of Buganda c.1734–c.1736	Succeeded by Kikulwe Mawuba
