= Kabaka of Buganda =

Title of the king of Buganda, Uganda

- Coat of Arms of Buganda

Incumbent
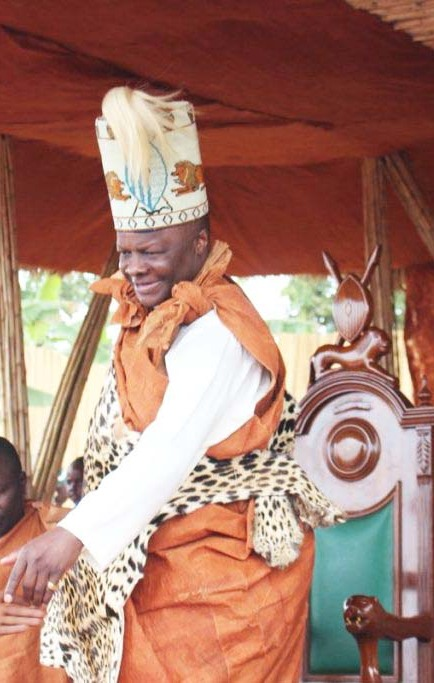
- Muwenda Mutebi II since 31 July 1993

Details
- Style: His Majesty
- First monarch: Kato Kintu
- Formed: 14th century
- Residence: Lubiri
- Website: buganda.or.ug

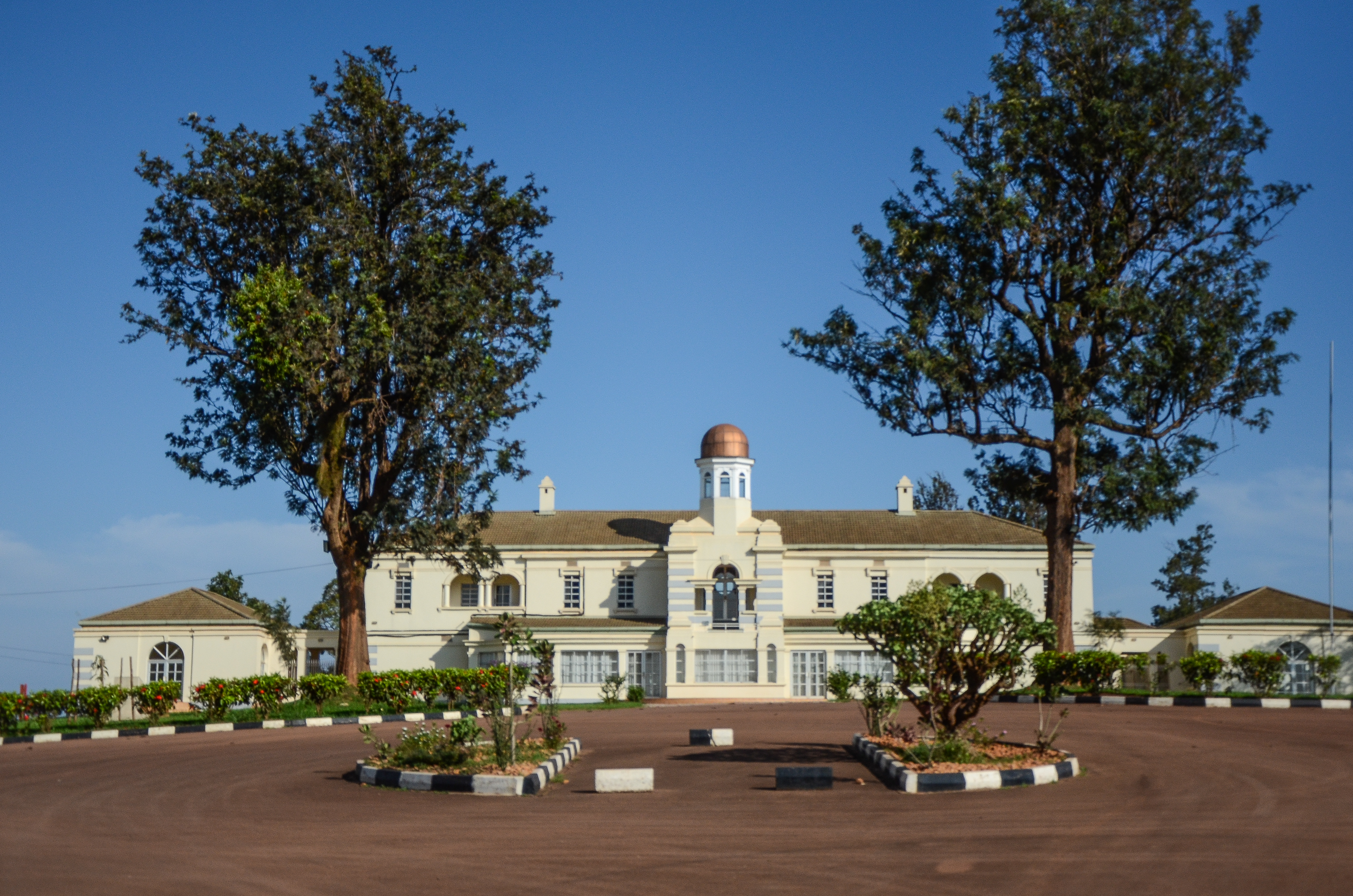
Lubiri, the Kabaka's palace at Mengo, Kampala

Kabaka is the title of the king of the Kingdom of Buganda. According to the traditions of the Baganda, they are ruled by two kings, one spiritual and the other secular.

The spiritual, or supernatural, king is represented by the Royal Drums, regalia called Mujaguzo. As they always exist, Buganda will always have a king. Mujaguzo, like any other king, has his own palace, officials, servants and palace guards. The material, human prince has to perform special cultural rites on the Royal Drums before he can be declared king of Buganda. Upon the birth of a royal prince or princess, the Royal Drums are sounded by drummers specially selected from a specified clan as a means of informing the subjects of the kingdom of the birth of a new member of the royal family. The same Royal Drums are sounded upon the death of a reigning king to officially announce the death of the material king. According to Buganda culture, a king does not die but gets lost in the forest. Inside Buganda's royal tombs such as the Kasubi Tombs and the Wamala Tombs, one is shown the entrance of the forest. It is a taboo to look beyond the entrance.

Additionally, there is another specific tradition of the Baganda concerning the two kings who rule the Kingdom of Buganda that began after the death of Kabaka Tebandeke (c. 1704 – c. 1724). When Kabaka Tebandeke died, he was succeeded by two kings of Buganda; the first was his cousin Kabaka Ndawula Nsobya (c. 1724 – c. 1734) who became the material king and the second was his only surviving biological son Juma Katebe who became the spiritual king. Juma Katebe (sometimes spelt Juma Kateebe) held the spiritual priesthood which was originally part of the throne of the Kabaka. Since the death of Kabaka Tebandeke, the two lines of kings have been in perpetual succession to date. Juma Katebe is king over the spirits or the spiritual forces of the Buganda kingdom. The current reigning spiritual king is also named "Juma Katebe" after the name of the historical only surviving biological son of Kabaka Tebandeke who was named Juma Katebe. When the coronation of the material king is done, the coronation of the spiritual king (Juma Katebe) is also done. The Juma Katebe, the spiritual king, is involved in the traditional procedures to crown the new material king after the death of a reigning material king. The Juma Katebe’s spiritual power originates from Kabaka Tebandeke. The Juma Katebe regularly visits the "masiro" or palace tomb or burial ground of Kabaka Tebandeke located in Bundeke, Merera in Busiro (part of Wakiso district of Uganda) to perform special religious ceremonies.

== Election of kings ==
Buganda has no concept equivalent to the Crown Prince. All the princes are equally treated prior to the coronation of a new king following the death of a reigning monarch. However, during the period of a reigning king, a special council has the mandate to study the behavior and characteristics of the young princes. The reigning king, informed by the recommendation of the special council, selects one prince to be his successor. In a secret ceremony, the selected prince is given a special piece of bark cloth by the head of the special verification council. The name of the "king-to-be" is kept secret by the special council until the death of the reigning king. When all the princes and princesses are called to view the body of the late king lying in state, the selected prince lays the special piece of bark cloth over the body of the late king, revealing himself as the successor to the throne.

The word Kabaka means ‘emissary’, and sometime in the past an overseer sent from Bunyoro had set himself up as an independent ruler.

— Kabaka Mutesa II.

By tradition, Baganda children take on the clan of their biological fathers. It is a common misconception that the Kabaka (king) of Buganda takes his clan from his mother. Some go as far as saying that Buganda's royal family was matrilineal. Neither of these assertions is true.

The Kabaka has his own clan which is called the royal clan "Olulyo Olulangira". Members of this clan are referred to as abalangira for males and abambejja for females. The misconception arose in part because the royal clan has no totem which is something that all other Baganda clans have. However, the totem should not be confused with the clan. The totem is just a symbol but the clan is a matter of genealogy. The royal clan has its own genealogy traced along the patrilineal line, extending all the way back to Kintu.

The firstborn prince, by tradition called Kiweewa, is not allowed to become king. That was carefully planned to protect him against any attempted assassinations in a bid to fight for the crown. Instead, he is given special roles to play in the matters of the royal family and kingdom. Thus, the name of the possible successor to the throne remains secret. The only exception to this rule occurred during the religious civil war when in 1888, a firstborn prince, Kiweewa was made King.

== Kings of Buganda ==
1. Kato Kintu, early fourteenth century
2. Chwa I, mid fourteenth century
3. Kimera, c. 1374 – c. 1404
4. Ttembo, c. 1404 – c. 1434
5. Kiggala, c. 1434–c. 1464 and c. 1484–c. 1494
6. Kiyimba, c. 1464–c. 1484
7. Kayima, c. 1494–c. 1524
8. Nakibinge, c. 1524–c. 1554
  Brief Interregnum, c. 1554–c. 1555
9. Mulondo, c. 1555–1564
10. Jemba, c. 1564–c. 1584
11. Suuna I, c. 1584–c. 1614
12. Sekamaanya, c. 1614–c. 1634
13. Kimbugwe, c. 1634–c. 1644
14. Kateregga, c. 1644–c. 1674
15. Mutebi I, c. 1674–c. 1680
16. Juuko, c. 1680–c. 1690
17. Kayemba, c. 1690–c. 1704
18. Tebandeke, c. 1704–c. 1724
19. Ndawula, c. 1724–c. 1734
20. Kagulu, c. 1734–c. 1736
21. Kikulwe, c. 1736–c. 1738
22. Mawanda, c. 1738–c. 1740
23. Ndugwa I, c. 1740–c. 1741
24. Namuggala, c. 1741–c. 1750
25. Kyabaggu, c. 1750–c. 1780
26. Jjunju, c. 1780–c. 1797
27. Semakookiro, c. 1797–c. 1814
28. Kamaanya, 1814–1832
29. Suuna II, 1832–1856
30. Muteesa I, 1856–1884
31. Mwanga II, 1884–1888 and 1889–1897
32. Kiweewa, 1888
33. Kalema, 1888–1889
34. Daudi Cwa II, 1897–1939
35. Mutesa II, 1939–1967 (abolition) or 1969 (death)
  Second Interregnum; Monarchy abolished under the 1967 Ugandan Constitution, 1967–1993
36. Muwenda Mutebi II, 1993–present

== Quotes ==
"The Kiganda Monarchy in its purest form ended with Suuna; under Mutesa I, it was scorched; and under Mwanga it was destroyed."

- G. N. Uzoigwe, Britain and the Conquest of Africa, 1974

"Whatever else divided the Baganda; they were united under the institution of Kabaka and derived their pride from service to the Kabaka and nation."

- Samwiri Lwanga Lunyiigo, Mwanga II, 2011

== See also ==
- History of Buganda
