= Mwanga I of Buganda =

Ssekabaka Mwanga I

Kabaka of Buganda
- Reign: 1740 – 1741
- Predecessor: Mawanda of Buganda
- Successor: Namuggala of Buganda
- Born: Uganda
- Died: 1741; Unknown
- Burial: Kavumba, Busiro
- Spouse: 1. Lady Najjuma; 2. Lady Nakabugo; 3. Nabakyaala Nakiwala; 4. Lady Nalubowa; 5. Lady Namakula
- Father: Prince Musanje Golooba
- Mother: Namasole Nabulya Naluggwa

Mwanga I was Kabaka of the Kingdom of Buganda from 1740 until 1741. He was the twenty third (23rd) Kabaka of Buganda.

== Claim to the throne ==
He was the eldest son of Prince Musanje Golooba. His mother was Nabulya Naluggwa of the Ndiga clan, the second wife of his father. He ascended to the throne after the death of his uncle, Kabaka Mawanda Sebanakitta, in 1740.

== Reign ==
Mwanga I and his brothers were the first Buganda Monarchs to go to Nnagalabi (later to be named Budo) for their coronation ceremonies. Previous Kabakas had gone to Nankere for the final and most important confirmation ceremony.

Some of the great officers of state during his reign included;

Name	Clan	Position	Translation
Ssebanaakitta	Mamba (Lungfish)	Katikiro	Chief Minister
Lubinga	Lugave (Pangolin)	Kasujju	Governor of Busujju
Matumpaggwa	Nkima (Vervet Monkey)	Kangaawo	Governor of Bulemezi
Mugwanya	Nkima (Vervet Monkey)	Mugema	Governor of Busiro
Kibaate	Ntalaganya (Duiker)	Kitunzi	Governor of Gomba
Manganyi	Ndiga (Sheep)	Katambala	Governor of Butambala

== Married life ==
He is recorded to have married five (5) wives:

- Najjuma, daughter of Natiigo, of the Lugave clan
- Nakabugo, daughter of Mugema, of the Nkima clan
- Naabakyaala Nakiwala, Omubikka, daughter of Semwanga, of the Ngonge clan
- Nalubowa, daughter of Segiriinya, of the Ngo clan
- Namakula, daughter of Mpinga, of the Lugave clan

== Issue ==
He is recorded to have fathered three (3) sons:

- Prince (Omulangira) Mulage, whose mother was Najjuma. He became Sabaddu to the princesses.
- Prince (Omulangira) Kiwanuka, whose mother was Nakabugo
- Prince (Omulangira) Nkondoggo, whose mother was Namakula

== The final years ==
Mwanga is said to have reigned for only two months; he was a cruel man and it was his cruelty which resulted in his untimely death.

— MM Semakula Kiwanuka.

Kabaka Mwanga I Sebanakitta was killed by Nkunnumbi, in revenge for the murder of his son, around 1741. He was initially buried at Meerera. In 1860, his remains were exhumed and re-buried at Kavumba, Busiro. He was succeeded by his brother, Prince Namuggala Kagali.

== See also ==
- Kabaka of Buganda

Preceded by Mawanda Sebanakitta	King of Buganda c.1740–c.1741	Succeeded by Namuggala Kagali
