= Wife =

Female spouse; woman who is married

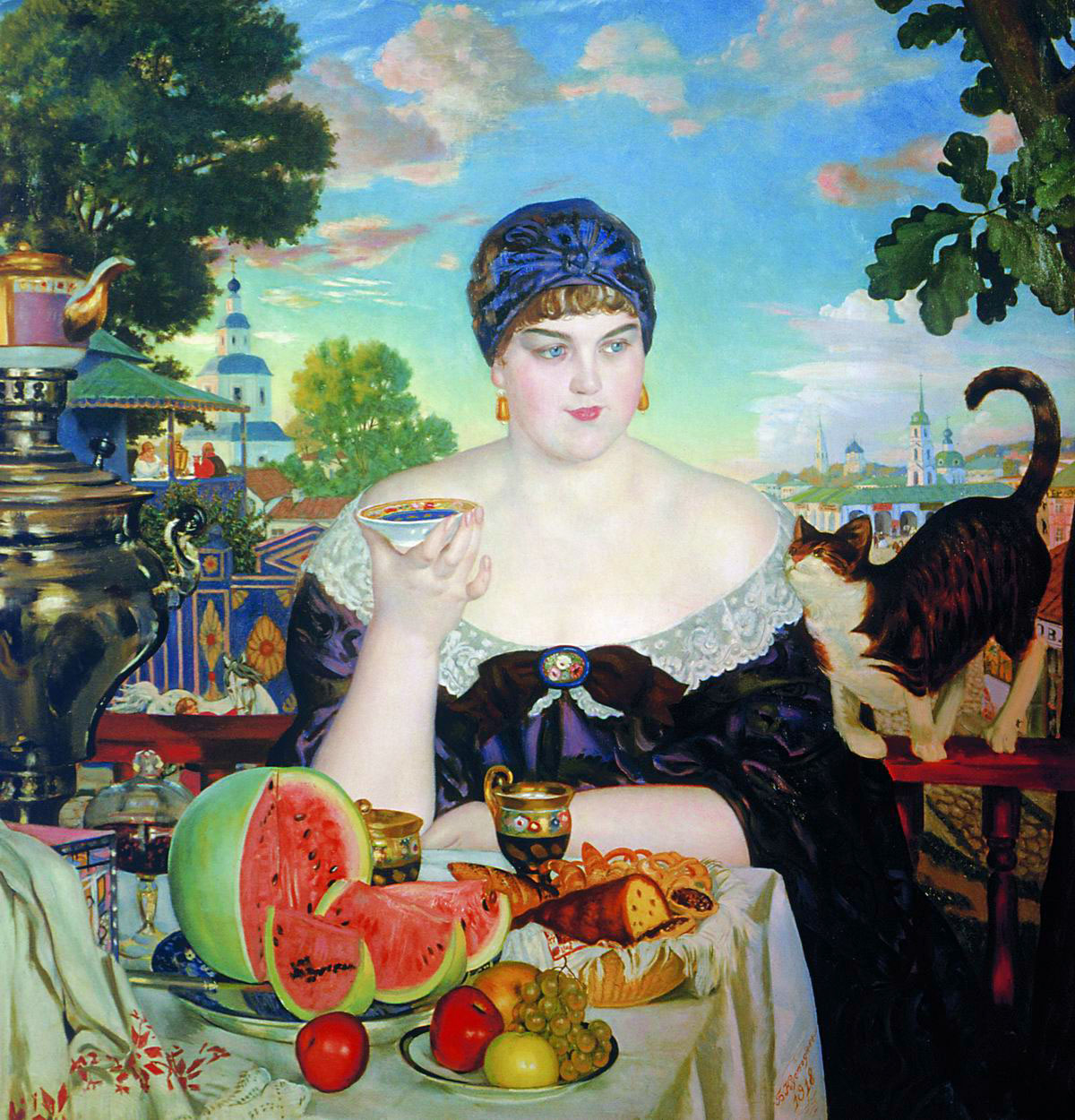
The Merchant's Wife (1918) by Boris Kustodiev

A wife (pl.: wives) is a woman in a marital relationship. A woman who has separated from her partner continues to be a wife until their marriage is legally dissolved with a divorce judgment; or until death, depending on the kind of marriage. On the death of her partner, a wife is referred to as a widow. The rights and obligations of a wife to her partner and her status in the community and law vary between cultures and have varied over time.

== Etymology ==
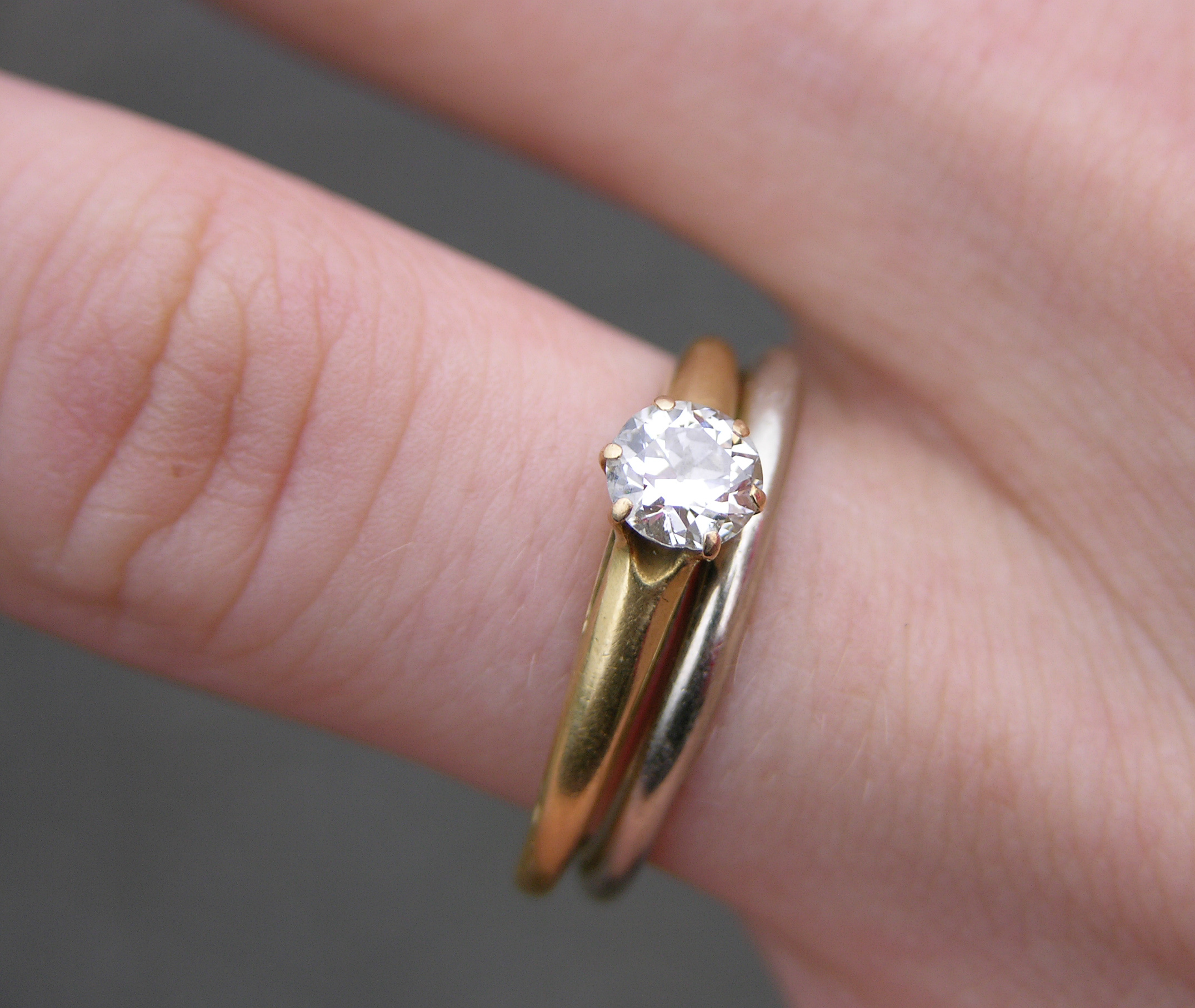
A white gold wedding ring and a single-diamond, gold-banded engagement ring. In many cultures, wives show their marital status through various symbols.

The word is of Germanic origin from the Proto-Germanic word wībam, which translates into "woman". In Middle English, it had the form wif, and in Old English wīf, "woman or wife". It is related to Modern German Weib (woman, female), Danish viv (wife, usually poetic), and Dutch wijf (woman, generally pejorative, cf. bitch). The original meaning of the phrase "wife" as simply "woman", unconnected with marriage or a husband/wife, is preserved in words such as "midwife", "goodwife", and "spaewife".

== Changes after marriages ==
After marriage, it is generally expected in many cultures that a woman will take her husband's surname, though this is not universal. A married woman may indicate her marital status in a number of ways: in Western culture, a married woman would commonly wear a wedding ring, but in other cultures, other markers of marital status may be used. A married woman is commonly given the title "Mrs", but some married women prefer to be referred to as "Ms", a title which is also used by preference or when the marital status of a woman is unknown.

== Related terminology ==
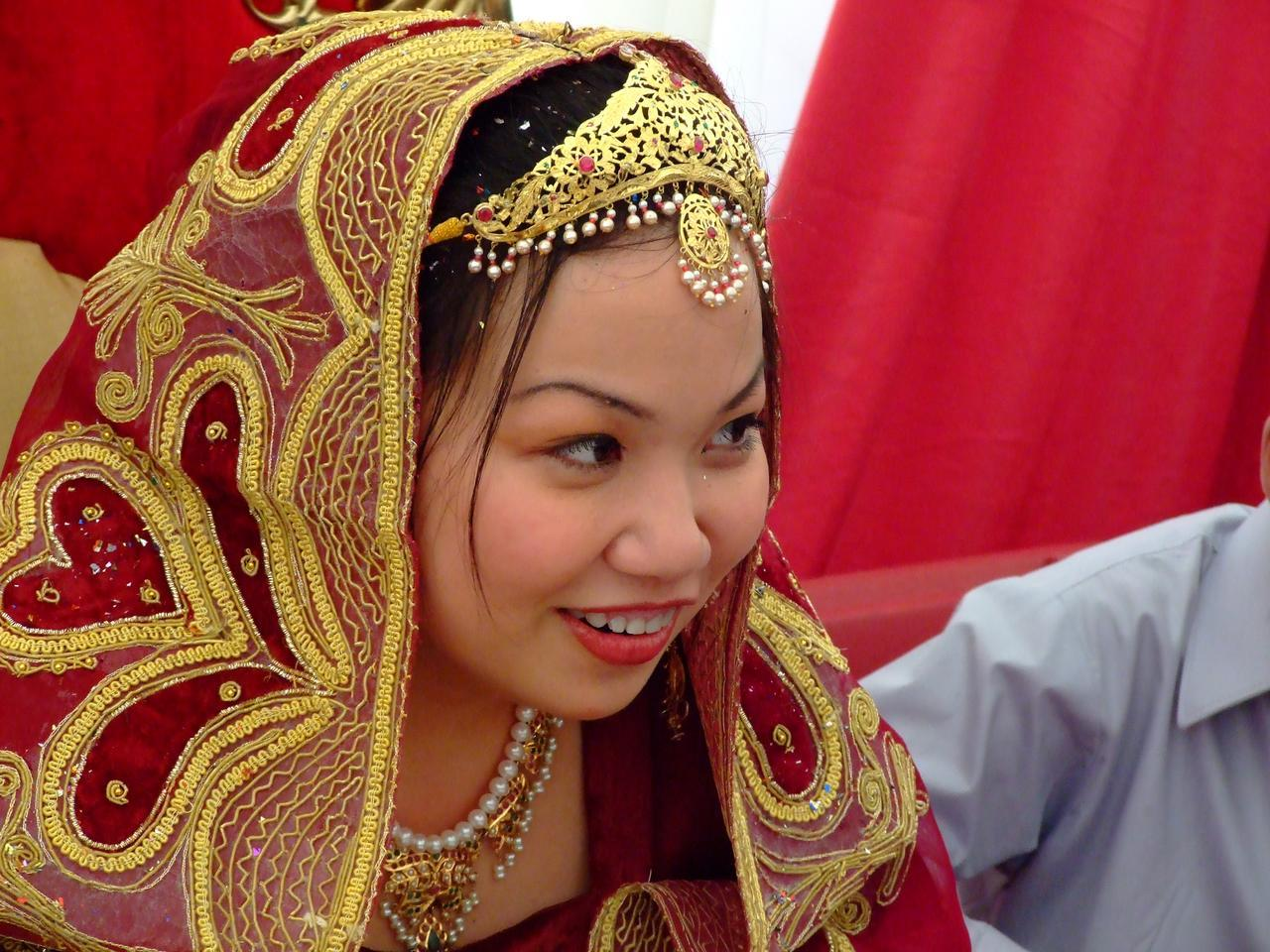
A young bride at her nikah (Islamic wedding)

A woman on her wedding day is usually described as a bride. Occasionally, this naming is considered appropriate after the wedding ceremony or the honeymoon, though she is typically called a wife within the marriage. If she is marrying a man, her partner is known as the bridegroom during the wedding and within the marriage is called her husband. If she is marrying a woman, each partner is referred to as a wife.

In the older customs, which are still followed by the Roman Catholic ritual, the word bride actually means fiancée, and applies up to the exchange of matrimonial consent (the actual marriage act). From that point, even while the rest of the very ceremony is ongoing, the woman is a wife and no longer considered as a bride. Hence, the bridal couple is no longer referred to as such, but instead as the newlywed couple or "newlyweds".

Unlike mother, a term that puts a woman into the context of her children, "Wife" refers to the institutionalized relation to the other spouse. In some societies, especially historically, a concubine was a woman who was in an ongoing, usually matrimonially oriented relationship with a man who could not be married to her, often due to a difference in social status.

The term wife is most commonly applied to a woman in a union sanctioned by law (including religious law), but not to a woman in an informal cohabitation relationship, which may be known as a girlfriend, partner, cohabitant, significant other, concubine, mistress, etc. However, a woman in a so-called common law marriage may describe herself as a common law wife, de facto wife, or simply a wife. Those seeking to advance gender neutrality may refer to both marriage partners as "spouses". In response to this naming change, many countries and societies are rewording their statute law by replacing "wife" and "husband" with "spouse". A former wife whose spouse is deceased is a widow.

== Termination of the status of a wife ==
The status of a wife may be terminated by divorce, annulment, or the death of a spouse. In the case of divorce, terminology such as a former wife, former-wife or ex-wife is often used. In regard to annulment, such terms are not strictly accurate. This is because annulment, unlike divorce, is usually retroactive, meaning that an annulled marriage is considered to be invalid from the beginning as though it had never taken place. In the case of the death of the other spouse, the term used is widow. The social status of such women varies by culture. In some places, they may be subject to potentially harmful practices, such as widow inheritance or levirate marriage, or social stigmatization. In some cultures, the termination of the status of wife makes life itself meaningless. In the case of those cultures that practice sati, a funeral ritual within some Asian communities, a recently widowed woman intentionally commits suicide by fire, typically upon the husband's funeral pyre.

== Legal rights of the wife ==
The legal rights of a wife have been subject to debate since the 19th century in many jurisdictions. The subject was in particular addressed by John Stuart Mill in The Subjection of Women (1869). Historically, many societies have given sets of rights and obligations to husbands that differ vastly from the sets of rights and obligations given to wives. In particular, the control of marital property, inheritance rights, and the right to dictate the activities of children of the marriage, have typically been given to male marital partners. However, this practice was curtailed to a great deal in many countries in the twentieth century, and more modern statutes tend to define the rights and duties of a spouse without reference to gender. Among the last European countries to establish full gender equality in marriage were Switzerland, The new reforms came into force in January 1988. Greece, Spain, and France in the 1980s. In various marriage laws around the world, however, the husband continues to have authority. For instance, the Civil Code of Iran states in Article 1105: "In relations between husband and wife; the position of the head of the family is the exclusive right of the husband".

== Exchanges of goods or money ==
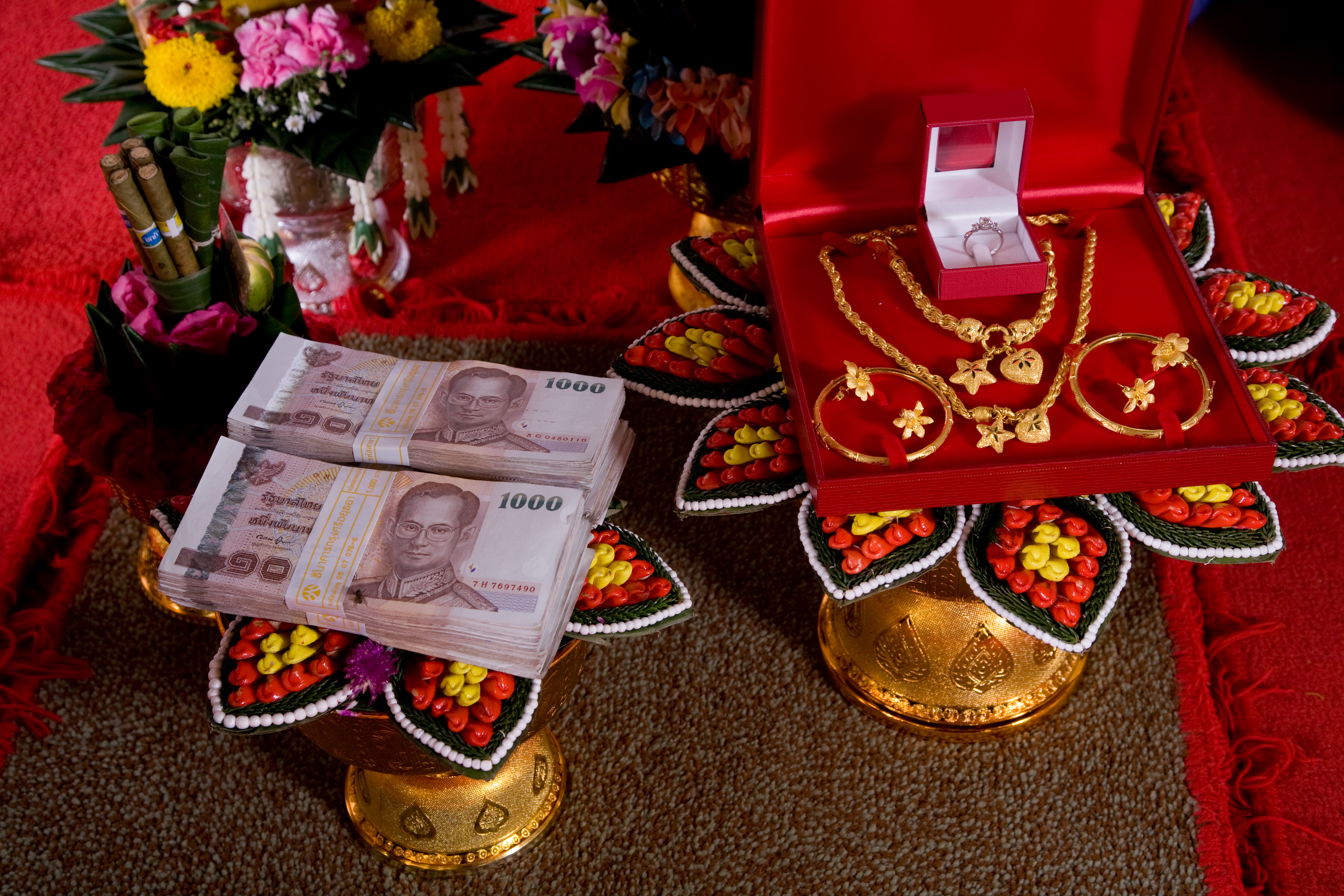
A traditional, formal presentation of the bride price at a Thai engagement ceremony.

In some parts of the world, traditional payments or exchanges are typically made, including:

- the bride or her family bring her husband a dowry,
- the husband or his family pay a bride price to the bride's family,
- both payments are exchanged between the families,
- or the husband pays the wife a dower.

The purpose of the dowry varies by culture and has varied historically. In some cultures, it was paid not only to support the establishment of a new family, but also served as a condition that if the husband committed grave offenses upon his wife, the dowry had to be returned to the wife or her family. Due to this condition, the dowry was often made inalienable by the husband during the marriage. Today, dowries continue to be expected in parts of South Asia such as India, Pakistan, Nepal, Bangladesh, and Sri Lanka, and conflicts related to their payment sometimes result in violence, such as dowry deaths and bride burning.

== Changing of name upon marriage ==
In some cultures, particularly in the Anglophone West, wives often change their surnames to that of the husband upon getting married. For some, this is a controversial practice, due to its tie to the historical doctrine of coverture and to the historically subordinated roles of wives. Others argue that today this is merely a harmless tradition that should be accepted as a free choice. Some jurisdictions consider this practice as discriminatory and contrary to women's rights, and have restricted or banned it; for example, since 1983, when Greece adopted a new marriage law which guaranteed gender equality between the spouses, women in Greece are required to keep their birth names for their whole life.

== Childbearing ==
Percentage of births to unmarried women, selected countries, 1980 and 2007.

Traditionally, and still in many cultures, the role of a wife was closely tied to that of a mother, by a strong expectation that a wife ought to bear children, while conversely, an unmarried woman should not have a child out of wedlock. These views have changed in many parts of the world. Children born outside marriage have become more common in many countries.

Although some wives in particular in Western countries choose not to have children, such a choice is not accepted in some parts of the world. In northern Ghana, for example, the payment of bride price signifies a woman's requirement to bear children, and women using birth control are at risk of threats and coercion. In addition, some religions are interpreted as requiring children in marriage; for instance, Pope Francis said in 2015 that choosing not to have children was selfish.

== Differences in cultures ==
=== Antiquity ===
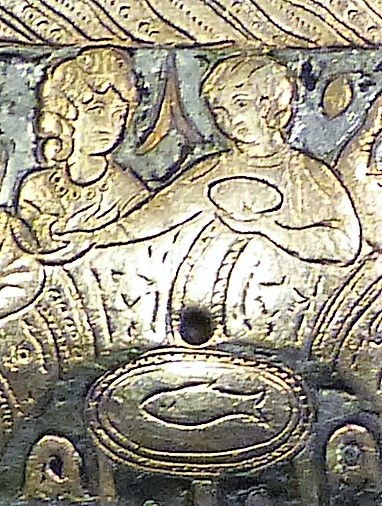
Seuso and his wife

Many traditions like a dower, dowry and bride price have long traditions in antiquity. The exchange of any item or value goes back to the oldest sources, and the wedding ring likewise was always used as a symbol for keeping faith to a person.

=== Western cultures ===
==== Historical status ====
In ancient Rome, The Emperor Augustus introduced marriage legislation, the Lex Papia Poppaea, which rewarded marriage and childbearing. The legislation also imposed penalties on young persons who failed to marry and on those who committed adultery. Therefore, marriage and childbearing was made law between the ages of twenty-five and sixty for men, and twenty and fifty for women. Women who were Vestal Virgins, were selected between the ages of 6 and 10 to serve as priestesses in the temple of goddess Vesta in the Roman Forum for 30 years after which time they could marry. Noble women were known to marry as young as 12 years of age, whereas women in the lower classes were more likely to marry slightly further into their teenage years. Ancient Roman law required brides to be at least 12 years old, a standard adopted by Roman Catholic canon law. In ancient Roman law, first marriages to brides aged 12–25 required the consent of the bride and her father, but by the late antique period Roman law permitted women over 25 to marry without parental consent. The father had the right and duty to seek a good and useful match for his children, and might arrange a child's betrothal long before he or she came of age. To further the interests of their birth families, daughters of the elite would marry into respectable families. If a daughter could prove the proposed husband to be of bad character, she could legitimately refuse the match. The age of lawful consent to a marriage was 12 for maidens and 14 for youths. In late antiquity, Most Roman women seem to have married in their late teens to early twenties, but noble women married younger than those of the lower classes, and an aristocratic maiden was expected to be virgin until her first marriage. In late antiquity, under Roman law, daughters inherited equally from their parents if no will was produced. In addition, Roman law recognized wives' property as legally separate from husbands's property, as did some legal systems in parts of Europe and colonial Latin America.

Christian cultures claim to be guided by the New Testament in regard to their view on the position of a wife in society as well as her marriage. The New Testament condemns divorce for both men and women (1 Cor 7:10–11) and assumes monogamy on the part of the husband: the wife is to have her "own" husband, and the husband is to have his "own" wife (1 Cor 7:2). In the medieval period, this was understood to mean that a wife should not share a husband with other wives. As a result, divorce was relatively uncommon in the pre-modern West, particularly in the medieval and early modern period, and husbands in the Roman, later medieval and early modern period did not publicly take more than one wife.

In pre-modern times, it was unusual to marry for love alone, although it became an ideal in literature by the early modern period. In the 12th century, the Roman Catholic Church drastically changed legal standards for marital consent by allowing daughters over 12 and sons over 14 to marry without their parents' approval, even if their marriage was made clandestinely. Parish studies have confirmed that late medieval women did sometimes marry against their parents' approval. The Roman Catholic Church's policy of considering clandestine marriages and marriages made without parental consent to be valid was controversial, and in the 16th century both the French monarchy and the Lutheran church sought to end these practices, with limited success.

The New Testament made no pronouncements about wives' property rights, which in practice were influenced more by secular laws than religion. Most influential in the pre-modern West was the civil law, except in English-speaking countries where English common law emerged in the High Middle Ages. In addition, local customary law influenced wives' property rights; as a result, wives' property rights in the pre-modern West varied widely from region to region. Because wives' property rights and daughters' inheritance rights varied widely from region to region due to differing legal systems, the amount of property a wife might own varied greatly. Under the English common law system, which dates to the later medieval period, daughters and younger sons were usually excluded from landed property if no will was produced. Under English common law, there was a system where a wife with a living husband ("feme couvert") could own little property in her own name. Unable to easily support herself, marriage was very important to most women's economic status. This problem has been dealt with extensively in literature, where the most important reason for women's limited power was the denial of equal education and equal property rights for females. The situation was assessed by the English conservative moralist Sir William Blackstone: "The husband and wife are one, and the husband is the one." Married women's property rights in the English-speaking world improved with the Married Women's Property Act 1882 and similar legal changes, which allowed wives with living husbands to own property in their own names. Until late in the 20th century, women could in some regions or times sue a man for wreath money when he took her virginity without taking her as his wife.

If a woman did not want to marry, another option was entering a convent as a nun. to become a "bride of Christ", a state in which her chastity and economic survival would be protected. Both a wife and a nun wore Christian headcovering, which proclaimed their state of protection by the rights of marriage. Much more significant than the option of becoming a nun, was the option of non-religious spinsterhood in the West. An unmarried woman, a feme sole, had the right to own property and make contracts in her own name. As first demonstrated quantitatively by John Hajnal, in the 19th and early 20th centuries the percentage of non-clerical Western women who never married was typically as high as 10–15%, a prevalence of female celibacy never yet documented for any other major traditional civilization. In addition, early modern Western women married at quite high ages (typically mid to late 20s) relative to other major traditional cultures. The high age at first marriage for Western women has been shown by many parish reconstruction studies to be a traditional Western marriage pattern that dates back at least as early as the mid-16th century.

==== Contemporary status ====
In the 20th century, the role of the wife in Western marriage changed in two major ways; the first was the breakthrough from an "institution to companionate marriage"; for the first time since the Middle Ages, wives became distinct legal entities, and were allowed their own property and allowed to sue. Until then, partners were a single legal entity, but only a husband was allowed to exercise this right, called coverture. The second change was the drastic alteration of middle and upper-class family life, when in the 1960s these wives began to work outside their home, and with the social acceptance of divorces the single-parent family, and stepfamily or "blended family" as a more "individualized marriage".

Today, some women may wear a wedding ring in order to show her status as a wife.

In Western countries today, married women usually have an education, a profession and they (or their husbands) can take time off from their work in a legally procured system of ante-natal care, statutory maternity leave, and they may get maternity pay or a maternity allowance. The status of marriage, as opposed to unmarried pregnant women, allows the spouse to be responsible for the child, and to speak on behalf of their wife; a partner is also responsible for the wife's child in states where they are automatically assumed to be the biological legal parent. Vice versa, a wife has more legal authority in some cases when she speaks on behalf of a spouse than she would have if they were not married, e.g. when her spouse is in a coma after an accident, a wife may have the right of advocacy. If they divorce, she also might receive—or pay—alimony (see Law and divorce around the world).

==== Women's income affects the dynamics of heterosexual love relationships ====
The effect of women's income on heterosexual relationships' dynamics depends on several factors. If the couple has strong traditional values, the income of women will affect men's gender identity and affect their well-being. If they have strong liberal values, the income of a woman will make the woman the provider of the house and put the man in a more domestic role. However, in most cases a couple will develop a mutually dependent relationship where the woman's income is needed, but at the same time the woman will do the majority of the housework.

At the beginning of the 1970s the traditional dynamic was that women performed domestic labor and that men worked for income due to the economic pressures in place. Eventually, second wave feminism challenged this dynamic. Starting in the 1980s, correlations between higher income of women and higher rates of divorce began decreasing.

The economic independence theory establishes that if one side of the couple provides more than 60% of the total income of the couple, there is a dependence effect. Therefore, in recent decades women have had a major increase in their economic independence. At the same time, women have had to wrestle with other economic decisions, such as the postponement of motherhood.

=== Asia cultures ===
==== Hinduism ====
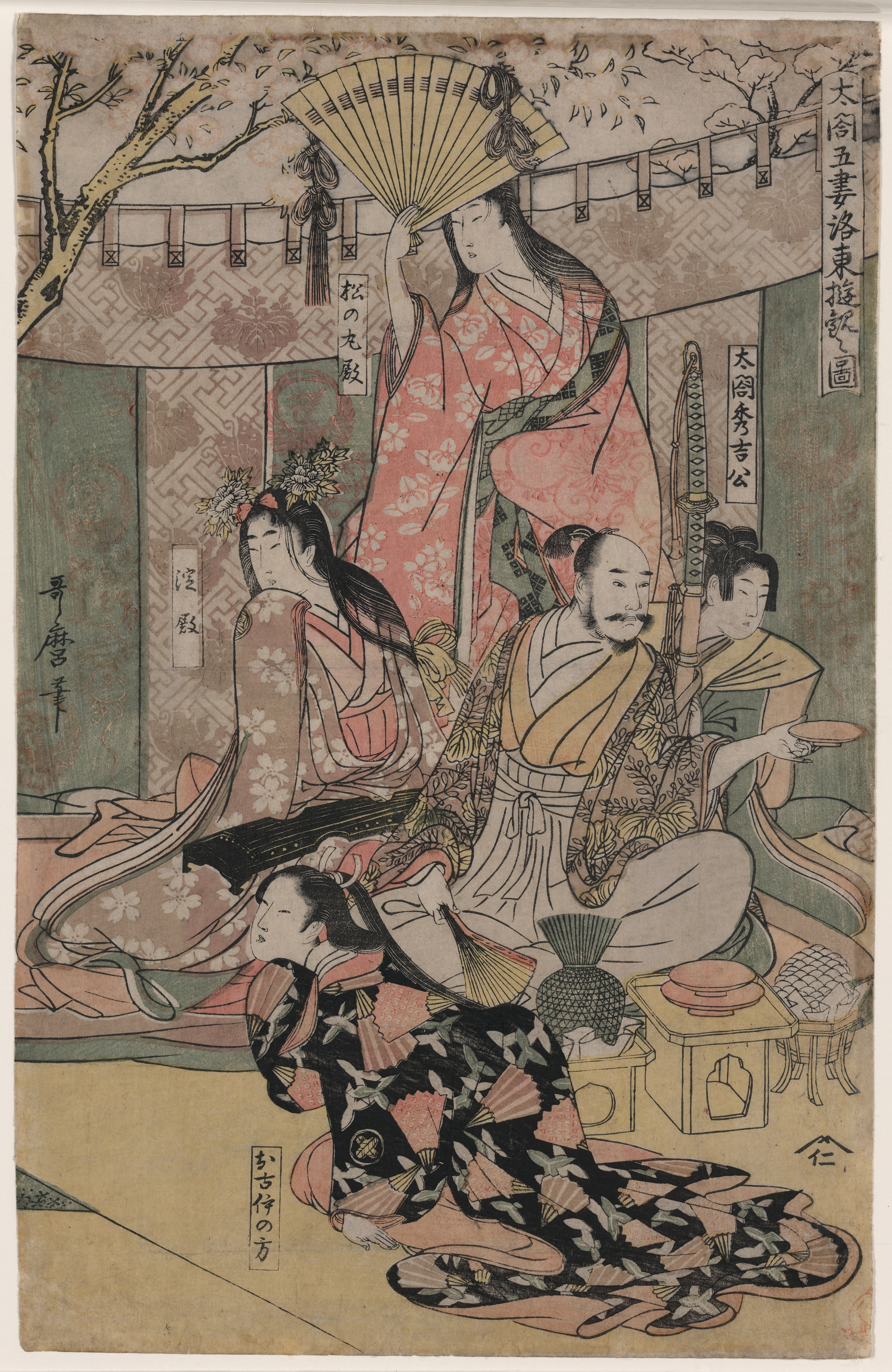
16th-century Samurai Toyotomi Hideyoshi sitting with his wives and concubines.

In Indo-Aryan languages, a wife is known as Patni, which means a woman who shares everything in this world with her husband and he does the same, including their identity. Decisions are ideally made in mutual consent. A wife usually takes care of anything inside her household, including the family's health, the children's education, a parent's needs.

The majority of Hindu marriages in rural and traditional India are arranged marriages. Once they find a suitable family (family of same caste, culture and financial status), the boy and the girl see and talk to each other to decide the outcome. In recent times however the western culture has had significant influence and the new generations are more open to the idea of marrying for love.

Indian law has recognized rape, sexual, emotional or verbal abuse of a woman by her husband as crimes. In Hinduism, a wife is known as a Patni or Ardhangini (similar to "the better half") meaning a part of the husband or his family. In Hinduism, a woman or man can get married, but only have one husband or wife respectively.

In India, women may wear vermilion powder on their foreheads, an ornament called Mangalsutra (Hindi: मंगलसूत्र) which is a form of necklace, or rings on their toes (which are not worn by single women) to show their status as married women.

==== Buddhism and Chinese folk religions ====
China's family laws were changed by the Communist revolution; and in 1950, the People's Republic of China enacted a comprehensive marriage law including provisions giving the spouses equal rights with regard to ownership and management of marital property.

==== Japan ====
In Japan, before enactment of the Meiji Civil Code of 1898, all of the woman's property such as land or money passed to her husband except for personal clothing and a mirror stand. See Women in Japan, Law of Japan

== Wife in Abrahamic religions ==
=== Wife in Christianity ===
Christian marriage as based on biblical teachings and conditions, is to be between one woman and one man, that God Himself joined them and that no human is to separate them, according to Christ's words (Matthew 19:4-6). The New Testament states that an unmarried Christian woman is to be celibate or is to become the Christian wife of one husband to avoid sexual immorality and for his sexual passion (1 Cor 7:1-2 & 8–9). The New Testament permits divorce of a Christian wife by a Christian husband only if she has committed adultery (Matthew 5:32). The New Testament allows a Christian widow to (re)marry a man she chooses (1 Cor 7:39) but forbids a divorced Christian woman to remarry because she would be committing adultery if she did (Matthew 5:32). As such she is to remain unmarried and celibate or be reconciled with her husband (1 Cor 7:1-2 & 8-9 and 1 Cor 7:10-11). A Christian wife can divorce a non-Christian husband if he wants a divorce (1 Cor 7:12-16). Christian husbands are to love their Christian wives as Christ loved the Church (Ephesians 5:25) and as he loves himself (Ephesians 5:33). The Christian wife is to respect her husband (Ephesians 5:33). Christian husbands are to not be harsh with their Christian wives (Colossians 3:19) and to treat them as a delicate vessel and with honor (1 Peter 3:7).

=== Wife in Islam ===
Women in Islam have a range of rights and obligations (see main article Rights and obligations of spouses in Islam). Marriage takes place on the basis of a marriage contract. The arranged marriage is relatively common in traditionalist families, whether in Muslim countries or as first or second-generation immigrants elsewhere.

Women in general are supposed to wear specific clothes, as stated by the hadith, like the hijab, which may take different styles depending on the culture of the country, where traditions may seep in. The husband must pay a mahr to the bride.

Traditionally, the wife in Islam is seen as a protected, chaste person that manages the household and the family. She has the ever-important role of raising the children and bringing up the next generation of Muslims. In Islam, it is highly recommended that the wife remains at home although they are fully able to own property or work. The husband is obligated to spend on the wife for all of her needs while she is not obligated to spend even if she is wealthy. Muhammad is said to have commanded all Muslim men to treat their wives well. There is a hadith by Al-Tirmidhi, in which Muhammad is said to have stated "The believers who show the most perfect faith are those who have the best character and the best of you are those who are best to their wives."

Traditionally, Muslim married women are not distinguished from unmarried women by an outward symbol (such as a wedding ring). However, women's wedding rings have recently been adopted in the past thirty years from Western culture.

=== Wife in Judaism ===
==== Rabbinic Judaism ====
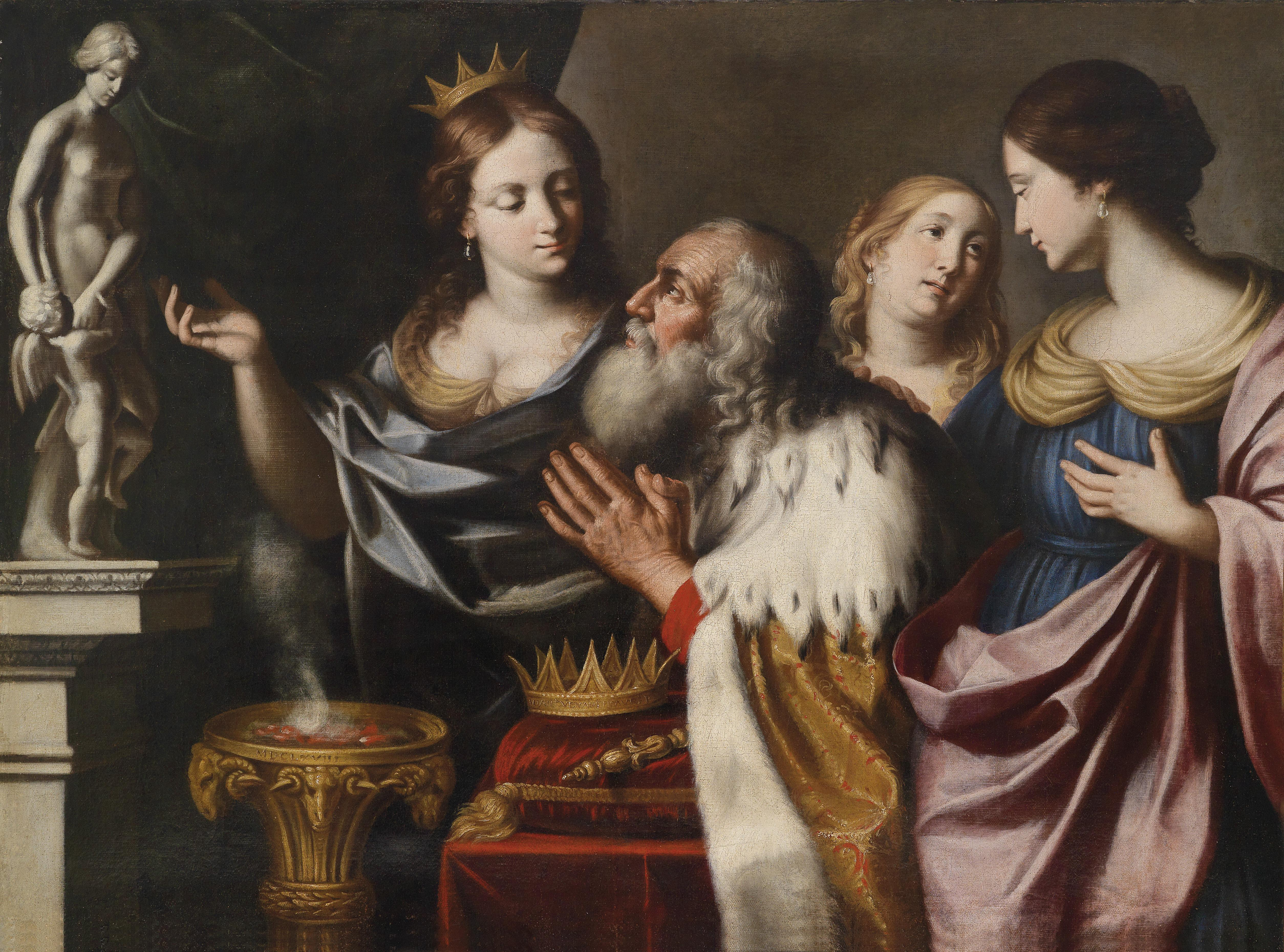
King Solomon with 3 of his many wives. Illustrated in 1668 by Giovanni Venanzi di Pesaro. According to Biblical account, Solomon had an obsession with women and fell in love with many.

Women in Judaism have a range of rights and obligations ( see main article Jewish views on marriage). Marriage takes place on the basis of a Jewish marriage contract, called a Ketubah. There is a blur of arranged marriages and love marriages in traditional families.

Married women, in traditional families, wear specific clothes, like the tichel.

==== Hebrew Bible ====
Once, a man called Shechem, a Hivite, offered a dowry to get an Israelite wife, but was rejected, since he was not an Israelite himself. Genesis 34

In ancient times there were Israelite women who were Judge, Queen regnant, Queen regent, Queen mother, Queen consort, and Prophetess: Deborah was the wife of an Israelite man whose name was Lapidoth, which means "torches." Deborah was a Judge and a Prophetess. Esther was the Jewish wife of a Persian King named Ahasuerus. Esther was Queen consort to the King of Persia and at the same time she was Queen regnant of the Jewish people in Persia and their Prophetess. Bathsheba was the Queen consort of King-Prophet David and then the Queen mother of King-Prophet Solomon. He rose from his throne when she entered and bowed to her and ordered that a throne be brought and he had her sit at his right hand, which is in stark contrast to when she was Queen consort and bowed to King-Prophet David when she entered. Prophet Jeremiah portrays a Queen mother as sharing in her son's rule over the kingdom in Jeremiah 13:18-20. The wife of Prophet Isaiah was a Prophetess. Isaiah 8:3

== Expectation of fidelity and violence related to adultery ==
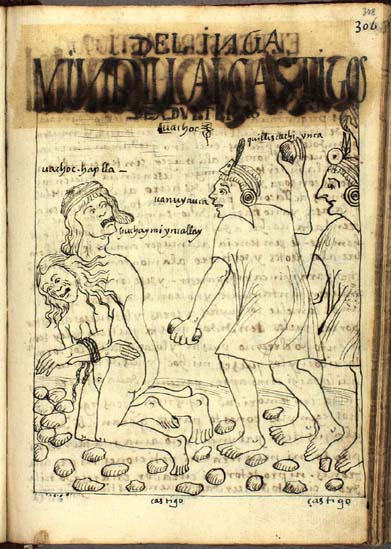
Inca woman and man to be stoned for adultery, by Huamán Poma

There is a widely held expectation, which has existed for most of recorded history and in most cultures, that a wife is not to have sexual relations with anyone other than her legal husband. A breach of this expectation of fidelity is commonly referred to as adultery or extramarital sex. Historically, adultery has been considered to be a serious offense, sometimes a crime, and a sin. Even if that is not so, it may still have legal consequences, particularly as a ground for a divorce. Adultery may be a factor to consider in a property settlement, it may affect the status of children, the custody of children; moreover, adultery can result in social ostracism in some parts of the world. In addition, affinity rules of Catholicism, of Judaism and of Islam prohibit an ex-wife or widow from engaging in sexual relations with and from marrying a number of relatives of the former husband.

In parts of the world, adultery may result in violent acts, such as honor killings or stoning. Some jurisdictions, especially those that apply Sharia law, allow for such acts to take place legally.

As of September 2010, stoning is a legal punishment in countries such as Saudi Arabia, Sudan, Iran, Yemen, the United Arab Emirates, and some states in Nigeria as punishment for zina al-mohsena ("adultery of married persons").

== See also ==
- Bride kidnapping
- Wife selling
