= Kibe Clan =

Clan of Buganda kingdom

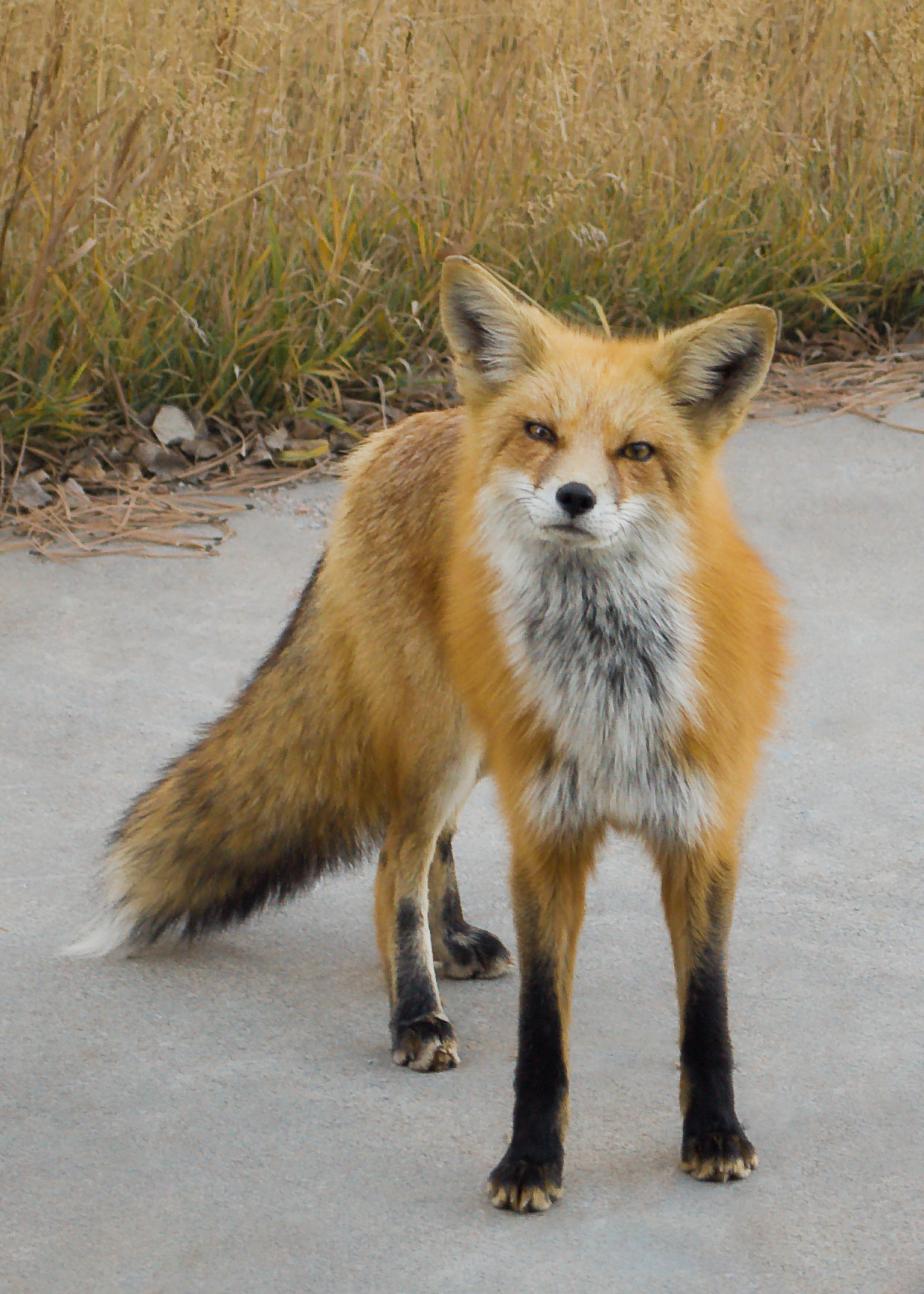
The picture shows a fox which represents the Kibe Clan totem of the Buganda Kingdom.

Kibe Clan is among the many clans in Buganda Kingdom. Kibe is a Luganda name which means fox. The Kibe Clan existed during the reign of King Kintu. The Head of the Clan is called Muyige. The Clan seat for Muyige is found at Wantaayi in Kyaggwe(Present Mukono District). The Kibe Clan people first settled in Busujju before they went to Kyaggwe(presently Mukono district).

== Origin ==
Once upon a time, King Jjuuko ordered his young brother Prince Kayemba to go and conquer the Buvuma territory. Prince Kayemba went with many Kibe Clan members to fight for the territory of Buvuma.

After successfully conquering Buvuma, some of his men from the Kibe Clan settled there. From Buvuma, some members then moved to Busoga. When Prince Kayemba returned to Buganda from Buvuma, many of the Kibe Clan members returned with him. They arrived at the Harbour Kigaya and it is from here that they were able to acquire land on the hills surrounding Harbour-Kiyaga and in the village of Makindu. They got land in Buikwe too as well as its surrounding and other places such as Buzaana and Bugolo.

Kibe Clan became prominent during the reign of Kabaka Ssemakookiro who ruled between 1779-1794.

== Main role ==
The Kibe Clan was given the role of "Obasenero bw'omwenge gwa Kabaka" meaning "Chief brewers to the King(Kabaka)" They got this title from the Nvuma Clan. They received this role during the reign of King Ssemakokiro.

== Origin of the Main role ==
There was a man called Kyasanku who belonged to the Kibe Clan, he went to live with Prince Ssemakookiro when he was living in Nnamwezi in Kyaggwe(currently Mukono District). This was where the Prince was preparing his men to attack his brother Kabaka Jjunju.

Kyasanku was a member of Ssemakokiro's army, so on their way to fight Kabaka Jjunju, Prince Ssemakokiro asked Kyasanku to give him some brew. By then, Kyasanku had thought of the idea of drinking brew with a stick which was hollow(Oluseke). This led to the Prince asking Kyasanku what had happened to the brew which had a stick in it. He asked,"Omwenge gwange gw'osimbyemu Oluti gubade ki?" which simply means,"What has happened to my brew in which you have put a stick(Oluti)?" Kyasanku replied saying,"Oluti olwo lujja kukunywesa bulungi omwenge nga teguyinza na kukuyiikira." simply meaning ,"The stick(oluti) will enable you drink your brew properly and it cannot spill on you." The Prince then decided to use the stick and realised the drink was flowing well and using the stick was more comfortable and convenient for him. So, from that time on, whenever he wanted a drink, he would ask Kyasanku to bring him brew together with the stick. That is when the Prince started calling Kyasanku,"Sseruti, ndeteera ku mwenge gwange nyweeko" meaning, "Sseruti, bring my brew so that I can drink." That is how Kyasanku got to be nicknamed Sseruti. Sseruti comes from the word Oluti which means stick.

After Prince Ssemakookiro fighting and defeating his big brother Jjunju, he removed the duty of Chief brewers from the Nvuma Clan and gave the duty to Sseruti who discovered the way of drinking brew with a stick(Oluseke-Oluti).

== Clan Information ==
Clan	Information
Clan (Ekika)	Kibe
Totem (Akabiro)	Mpiri
Clan Head (Omutaka)	Muyige
Clan Seat (Obutaka)	Buluutwe, Kyaggwe
Slogan (Omubala)	Kibe Kibe: Kimaze okulya, kyekubye ensiko, Kyasanku bakuzaala wa ? Wambogwe, Kabaka bwanywa anywa nvuba, Muyige bwakwana gw'akwana amalirira, Muyige waddalu waddalu.

== See also ==
- Mpindi Clan
- Buganda
- Kabaka of Buganda
- Mpologoma Clan
- Lugave Clan
- Nvuma Clan
- Njaza Clan
- Nvubu Clan
