= Njovu Clan =

Clan of Buganda kingdom

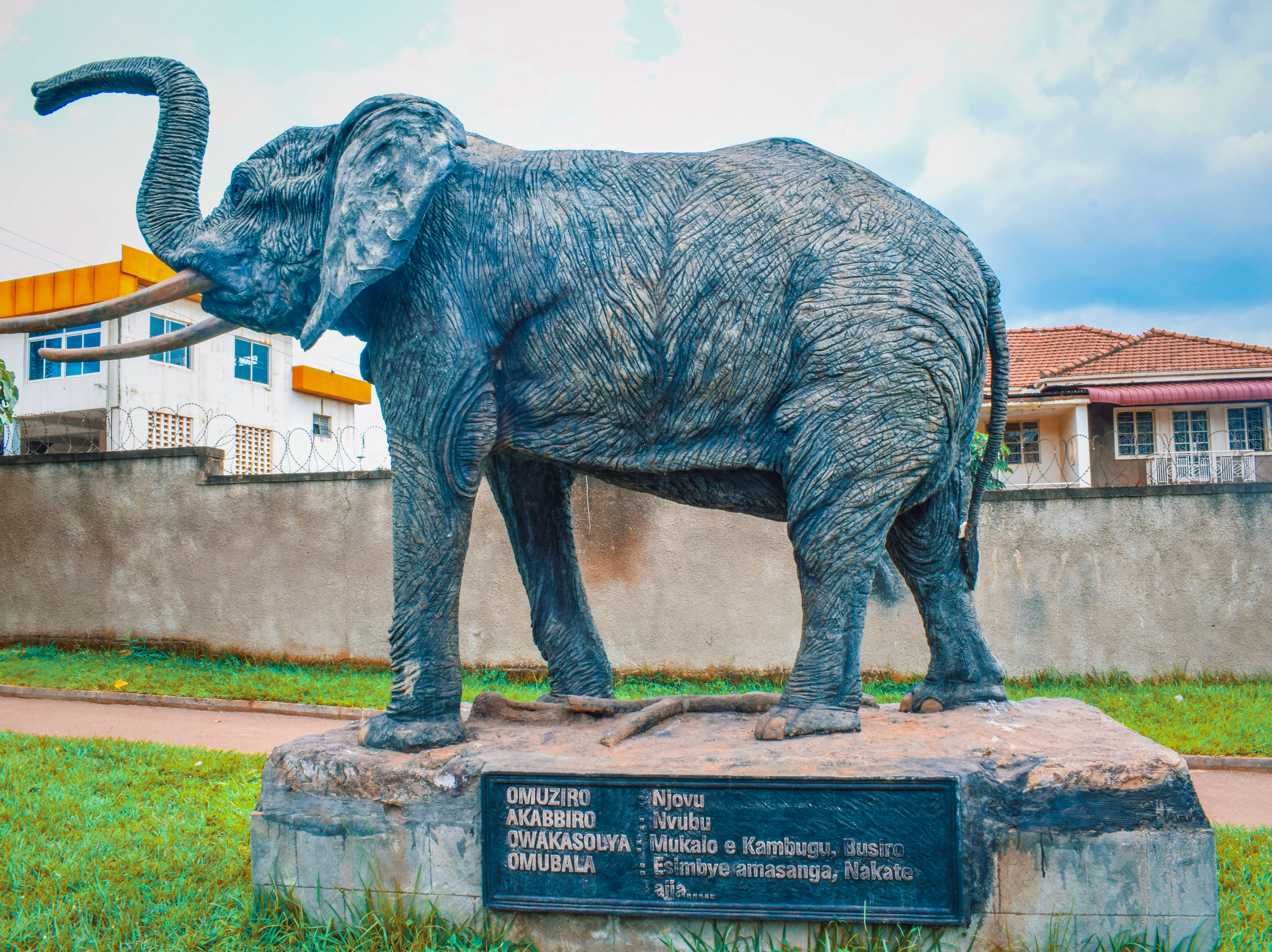
The Sculpture shows the Njovu Clan Totem located in Mengo, Kampala.

Njovu Clan is among the many clans in the present day Buganda Kingdom. All members belonging to the Buganda Kingdom belong to a clan inherited through the paternal lineage each having a totem. Njovu is a Luganda word meaning Elephant.The Head (great grandfather) of the Njovu Clan is Mukalo, he also is the founding father of the Clan.

== Origin ==
According to Buganda History, Kabaka Kintu came to Buganda along with Ssesanga who was one of his followers. Ssesanga was the one who used to carry the King's fighting tools such as spears and shields. When the King settled at Nnono, he gifted Ssesanga with a place called Ntonyeze in Busujju where he would settle down with his family and followers. He was rewarded for his loyalty and good work to the King.

At Ntonyeze, Ssesanga had a son called Mukalo who later became his heir. During the reign of King Chwa I, he then transferred Mukalo from Ntonyeze and gave him a place at Kambugu In Busiro. From that time on, Kambugu in Busiro became the clan seat for the Njovu Clan. Mukalo is therefore recognized as the founding father of the Njovu clan, and his descendants continue to serve as the hereditary clan leadership.

== Totem ==
The totem (''akabiro'') of the Njovu clan is Nvubu (hipopotamus).Clan totems in Buganda serve as symbolic identifiers and are culturally protected, and clan members traditionally avoid harming or eating their totem animals.

== Popular female names ==
Nnassanga, Nnanteza, Nnagujja, Nnakandi, Nnabitalo, Nnamaato, Nnabatte, Nnabwato, Nnambatuusa, Nnamukina, Nakayiga, Nnabbaale, Namaanyi, Nnantambi, Nnabuule, Nnassozi, Nakate

== Popular male names ==
Ssemmambo, Ggalabuzi, Kikomeko, Ssevviiri, Batte, Sseddyabanne, Ssentulubalo, Ssezzooba, Ssettyabule, Kiro, Ssebbaale, Ssessanga, Ssenteza, Ssozi, Ssegujja, Ssekandi, Ssekimpi, Wavvuvuumira, Kayaaye, Ssengo, Katunda, Kayiga, Ssenyomo, Ssemaanyi, Ssemukina, Nkayiivu, Ssensalire, Kakembo, Ssentomero, Mbazzi, Ntambi, Muzingu, Bitalo.

== Clan motto ==
The traditional clan motto (''omubala'') of the Njovu clan is:

'' Nsimbye amasanga, Nakate ajja! Batte Mugamba, tungulako emu, bbiri ku lwayi, ssatu ku kitooke. Sibamputanta n'empasasa mputanta.

Clan mottos serve as cultural praise phrases and expressions of identity within Buganda tradition.

== Role in Buganda society ==
Clans are the foundation of Buganda's social organization. The kingdom consists of more than 50 clans, each with its own leadership, traditions, and ancestral lineage. Clan identity regulates marriage, preserves genealogy, and maintains cultural continuity. Like any other members of other clans, members of Njovu clan, play important roles in Buganda's cultural and traditional institution.

== Sub-clan elders ==
These are the Seven Sub-Clan elders under Mukalo:

- Kikomeko at Lubu, Mawokota
- Ggulu at Busabala, Kyaddondo
- Kakembo at Zzirannumbu, Kyaddondo
- Ntambi at Lubya, Kyaddondo
- Ssebanyiiga at Kyazi(kojja), Kyaggwe
- Ssentomero at Zzinga, Kyaggwe
- Ssemakadde at Mpuku, Kyaggwe

== Clan Information ==
Clan	Information
Clan (Ekika)	Njovu
Totem (Akabiro)	Nvubu
Clan Head (Omutaka)	Mukalo
Clan Seat (Obutaka)	Kambugu, Busiro
Clan Envoy (Omubaka w'Omutaka mu) UK & Ireland	Daudi Sserukeera
Slogan (Omubala)	Nsimbye amasanga, Nakate ajja! Batte Mugamba, tungulako emu, Bbiri ku lwayi, ssatu ku kitooke. Sibamputanta nempasasa mputanta.

== See also ==
- Buganda Kingdom
- Buganda clans
- Culture of Buganda
- Kabaka of Buganda
- Mpindi Clan
- Lugave Clan
- Mpologoma Clan
- Nvubu Clan
- Nvuma Clan
- Ntalaganya Clan
- Nte Clan
