= Njaza Clan =

Clan of Buganda kingdom

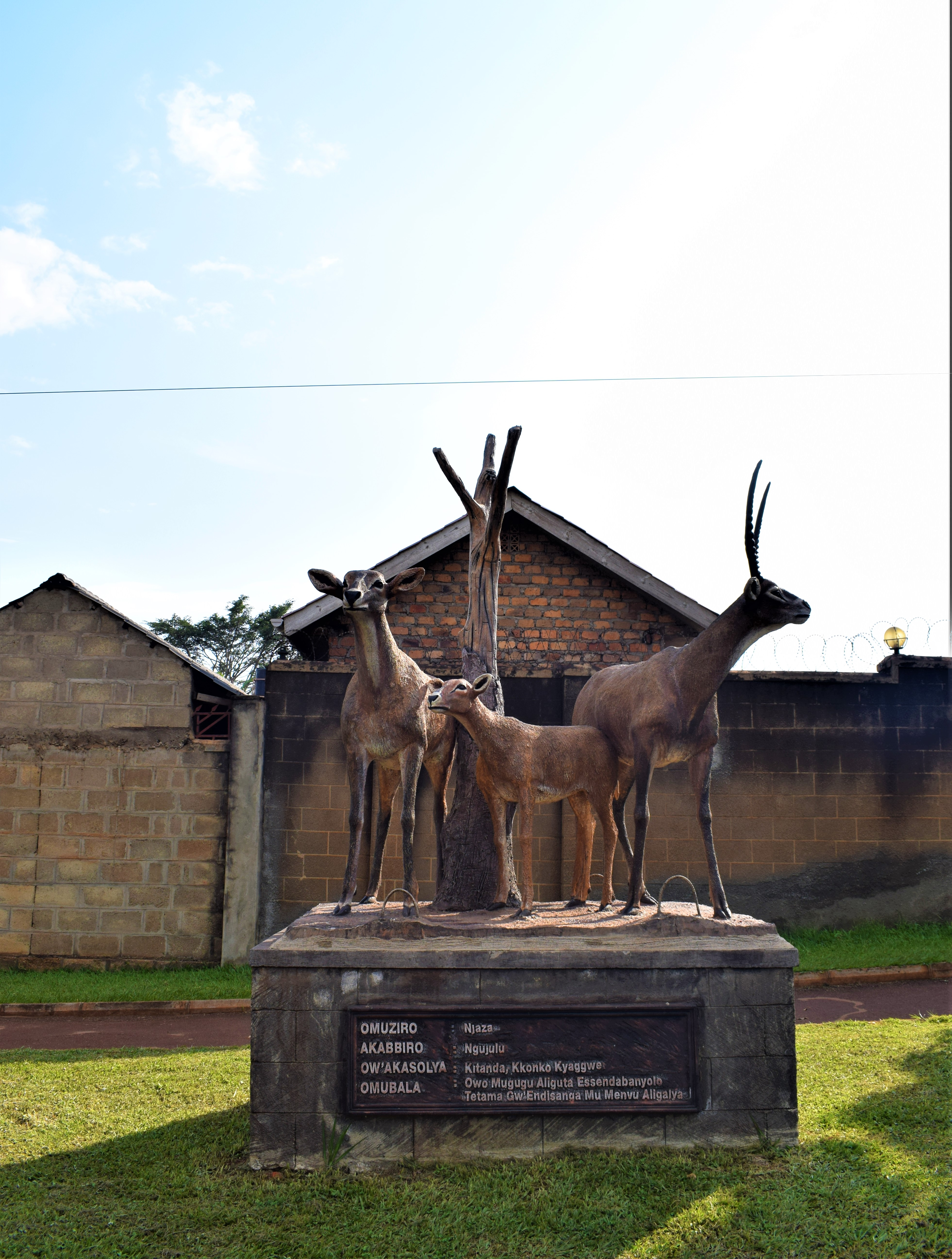
The sculpture shows the Njaza Clan totem of the Buganda Kingdom located in Mengo, Kampala.

Njaza Clan is among the many clans in the present day Buganda Kingdom.Njaza is a Luganda word meaning reedbuck which is a clan totem and a symbol of identity and ancestry. It is one of the five clans that are indigenous to Buganda before the coming of Kintu. The members of the five clans are referred to as the originals ( Bannansangwa ). The five other original clans were the Ffumbe, Ngeye, Lugave, and Nnyonyi Nnyange. They originated from Bunyoro and settled at Kiwawu in Busujju. From there, they moved and settled in the areas of Mabira Forest in Kyaggwe (currently Mukono District).

== Origin ==
When Kabaka Kintu arrived in Buganda Kingdom, the Njaza Clan had already been fully and well established in Kyaggwe. The main clan Seat was in Kirugu, it was then moved to Kkonko in Kyaggwe(currently Mukono District). Since Kyaggwe was close to Busoga, members of the Njaza Clan were sent on many assignments by the various Kings of Buganda. Masanso of Naminya was asked by the Kabaka Kyabaggu to settle in Butiki near Jinja and he was to act as the Kabaka's representative in Busoga. Everyone who was sent by the Kabaka of Buganda to Busoga and those going from Busoga to Kampala were supposed to first report to Masanso, the Kabaka's Busoga representative.

One day, Masanso visited the court of Kabaka in Buganda, he was asked by the Kabaka,"Waguma okusigala e Busoga?" meaning "Did you have the courage to stay in Busoga?" Masanso gave the Kabaka an assertive answer to the King as,"Naguma" meaning, "I got the courage". So from then on, Masanso's title became "Waguma". Some members of the Njaza Clan took chieftaincies in Busoga various times. Busoga also became a semi-tributary of Buganda.

== Roles played ==
The ritual duty of the Njaza Clan members was to hunt elephants for the King in the Mabira Forests as it used to have very many elephants.

Transporting the Kabaka's tributes from Busoga to Buganda was also one of their responsibilities.

They also served as customs officers in Kigungu Market where most of the merchandise from the states to the East of Buganda arrived into Buganda.

Also a member of the Njaza Clan named Kaggwa Ndikumulaga was responsible for the construction of Kabaka's lake in Mengo.

== Clan Information ==
| Clan | Information |
|---|---|
| Clan (Ekika) | Njaza |
| Totem (Akabiro) | Ngujulu |
| Clan Head (Omutaka) | Kitanda |
| Clan Seat (Obutaka) | Kkonko, Kyaggwe |
| Slogan (Omubala) | Ow'omugugu aliguta. |

== See also ==
- Buganda Kingdom
- Mpindi Clan
- Kabaka of Buganda
- Lugave Clan
- Mpologoma Clan
- Nvuma Clan
- Nte Clan
- Kibe Clan
- Nvubu Clan
