= Ntalaganya Clan =

Clan of Buganda kingdom

Ntalaganya Clan is among the many clans in the present day Buganda Kingdom. It is one of the clans that were there before the reign of King Kintu. Ntalaganya is a Luganda name which means Blue Duiker. the ancestral home of the Ntalaganya Clan is in Kiwawu (Busujju).Like all Baganda clans, the Ntalaganya clan forms part of the patrilineal clan system that defines social identity, ancestry, and cultural responsibility within Buganda society. The name ''Ntalaganya'' refers to the blue duiker, a small antelope species, which is associated with clan's identity and symbolism. Like other Buganda clans, the Ntalaganya clan has its own unique cultural traditions, including a clan totem, motto, ancestral lineage, and designated clan leaders responsible for preserving its heritage.

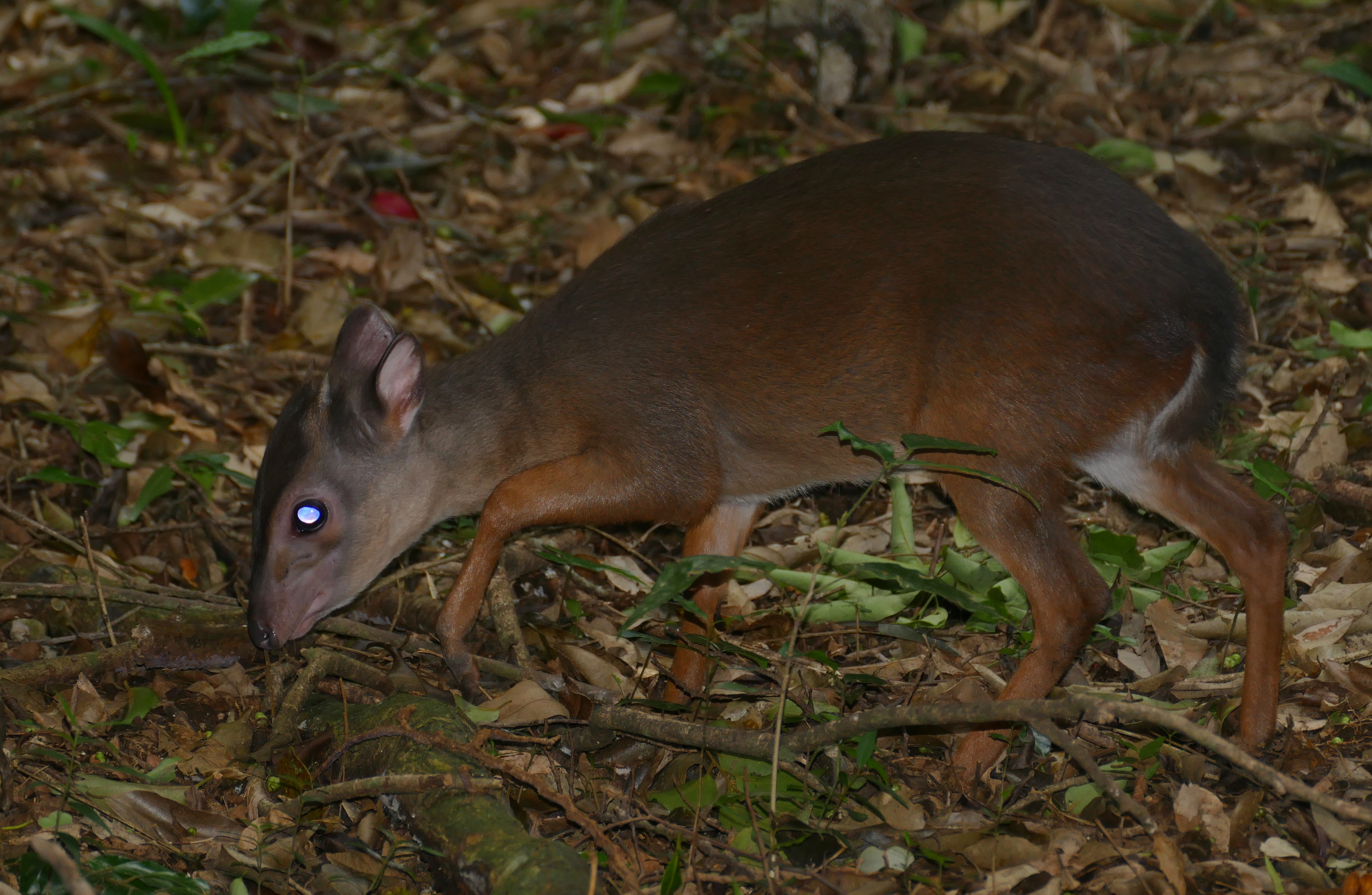
This is the photo of a blue duiker which represents the Ntalaganya Clan Totem in Buganda Kingdom.

== Origin ==
Historical records indicate that the warrior Bulamaga Wasswa defeated Bunyoro Chief in Ggomba during King Kateregga's reign. Following the Banyor's expulsion from Ggomba by King Kateregga, the Ntalaganya people extensively settled in the area.

Also Buganda History stresses that the people of the Ntalaganya Clan are the descendants of King Wadda who is said to have been the first King of Buganda before Kintu. Also the Buganda History says that Buganda had kings before Kintu and King Wadda is said to have been the first King of Buganda.

== Ntalaganya Kings ==
There are said to have been nine kings after Wadda namely:

1. Bukulu I,
2. Bukulu II,
3. Bbanga,
4. Musisi,
5. Ssemandamuntu,
6. Nsingere,
7. Buganda,
8. Lubaalewattu
9. Bemba.

All these kings are said to have been of the Ntalaganya clan.

== Ntalaganya Clan Heads ==
Clan Elders (Abamasiga) and their seats are as follows:

- Bbambaga of Bbambaga in Bulemeezi
- Ndimukazi of Buwanguzi in Ggomba
- Mugambajjoro of Kyaliwajjala in Kyaddondo
- Kalamazi of Jjinja in Kyaddondo
- Wadda of Kiwawu in Busujju
- Lutwama of Kakiri in Busiro
- Kyaddondo of Kawempe in Kyaddondo
- Nalumenya of Njolo in Busiro
- Bulijjanga of Bbambaga in Bulemeezi
- Ssebabi of Buggala in Bulemeezi
- Kiribata of Kibutamu in Gomba
- Ssensamba of Kalyabayoga in Gomba
- Luzingo of Kasozikake in Gomba
- Bukulu of Kabubula in Bulemeezi
- Ssebunya of Bunnya in Gomba

== Clan Information ==
Clan	Information
Clan (Ekika)	Ntalaganya
Totem (Akabiro)	1. Maleere ( a type of mushroom); 2. Omussukundu; 3. Amazzi g'ekisasi
Clan Head (Omutaka)	Bbambaga
Clan Seat (Obutaka)	Bbambaga, Bulemezi
Slogan (Omubala)	1. Omusajja Kalamazi ne jjo ndiramaga.; 2. Mussukundu Butiko

== Totem and cultural symbols ==
- Clan totems ("Omuziro" or "Akabiro") serve as symbolic identifiers and are treated with respect. Totems may be animals, plants or natural elements and represent the clans ancestry and spiritual heritage. The Ntalaganya clan is traditionally associated with the following symbols:
- Blue duiker
- Maleere
- Omussukundu
- Amazzi g'ekisasi

These totems are protected symbols and clan members traditionally avoid harming or consuming them.

== Role in Buganda society ==
Like other Buganda, the Ntalaganya clan contributes to the preservation of Buganda culture, governance, and social order. Clan leaders participate in traditional institutions and ceremonies, including coronations, funerals and cultural festivals. Clans also play an important role in maintaining oral history, kinship system and moral traditions within Buganda society.

== See also ==
- Njovu Clan
- Nte Clan
- Mpologoma clan
- Mpindi clan
- Lugave clan
