= Ngonge Clan =

Clan of Buganda kingdom

Nngonge clan
- Ekika ky'Eŋŋonge
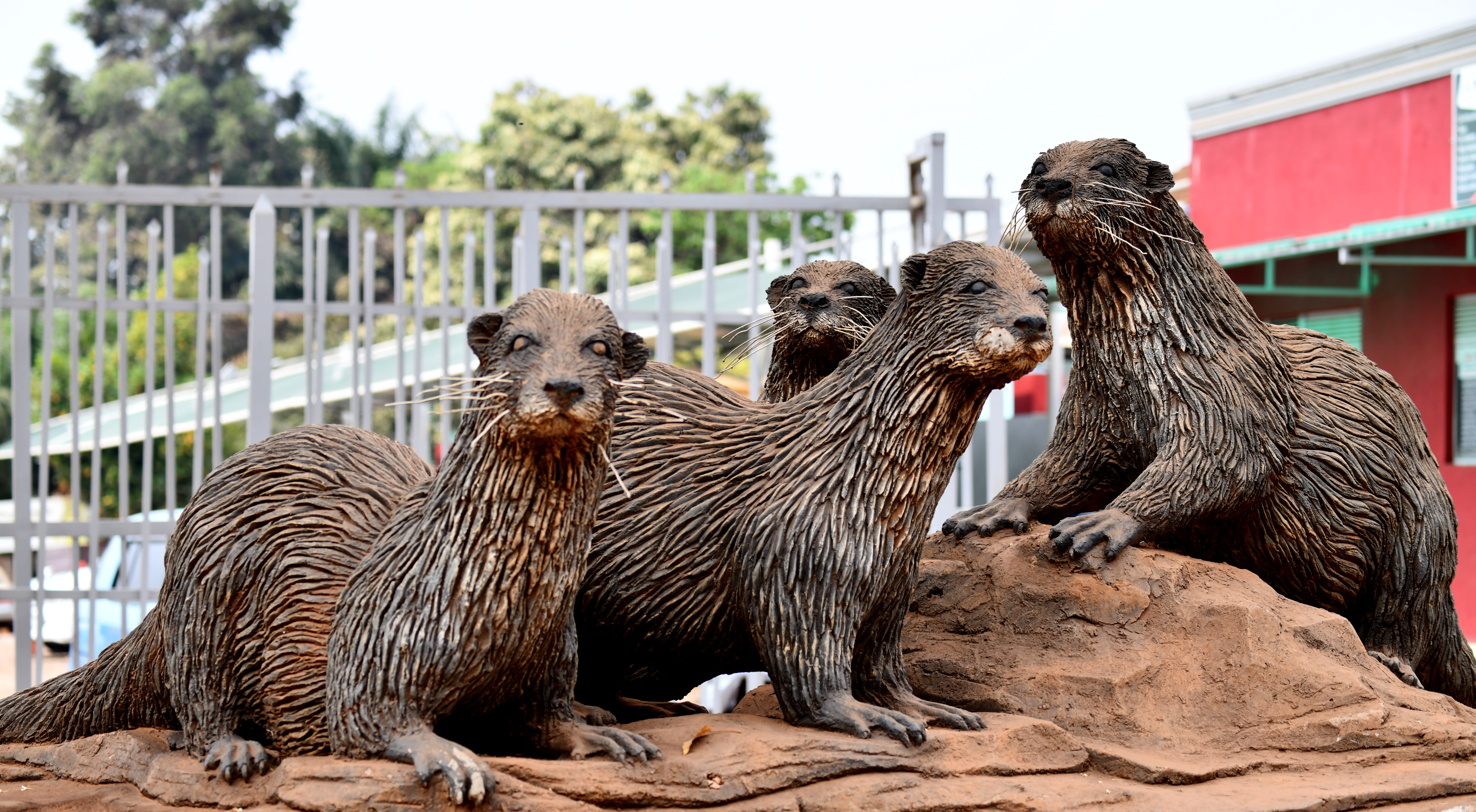
- Sculpture of the Nngonge
- Slogan: Abakyanja nkette,Abakyanja nkette Mwegali mwegali Lwajali lwajali Ekirimala abasajja ziriba nnyago Beppo Ddogo Bwegalibeera amafumu tuligendana Byaddalu byaddalu Bi Nakiwala byaddalu.

Profile
- Country: Uganda
- Region: Central Uganda
- Ethnicity: Baganda
- Founder: Muwanga Ssebyoto
- Animal: Ngonge (Otter)

Chief
- Matthias Kaboggoza Muwanga
- Kisolo
- Seat: Bweza, Busujju in Mityana
- Historic seat: Mawokota Sub-county

Nngonge clan also written as ηηonge clan in Luganda, is also known as Engonge clan, Ngonge clan, Buganda Otter clan or Ekika ky'engonge (in Luganda) is among the Clans of Buganda kingdom. The Ngonge is known as the Otter in the English language. Kisolo is a title given to the Nngonge clan leader.

== Clan history ==
The Ngonge clan is one of the Banansangwa (five indigenous clans of Buganda Kingdom) and these are; Lugave clan, Ffumbe clan, Njaza clan and Nyonyi clan.

The Ngonge clan was initiated by Muwanga Ssebyoto during the time of Ssekabaka Kato Kintu, Omutaka Muwanga Sebyooto was the first Kisolo of the Ngonge clan and the first Katikkiro of Buganda.

According to the Buganda mythology, Mwanga Ssebootyo disappeared with Ssekabaka Kintu and it is believed that every night sounds were heard, leaving the people wondering what they kept hearing during the dark nights hence referring to the sounds as "Kintu oba Kisolo" and this is where the title of Kisolo was gotten from.

Omutaka Muwanga Ssebyooto gave birth to four (04) children that is one daughter and three sons who form the Amasiga of the Ngone clan. The three sons were Lutaaya of Bbongole in Busujju, Ssenkungu of Lumuli in Mawokota and Kinkumu Kitumba of Bweza in Busujju. The daughter was Najjemba Nabachwa Kwamagezi who became the wife of Wanema (father to Jajja Mukasa). Najjemba is the spirit said to head the Ngonge clan.

Kisolo Muwanga Ssebootyo was appointed to be the first Musigire (Next of Kin) of Buganda Kingdom during the reign of Ssekabaka Kintu and as the Ssekabaka went for battle, he left his trusted friend and Katikiro as the Kingdom's next of kin.(Omusigire).

Wamala Buyungo Kaboggoza, invented the bark cloth in 1374-1404 during the reign of Kabaka kimera and it become the most treasured cultural fabric during that time. it was reserved for the Royal family, spiritual purposes and burial ceremonies but as time passed chiefs and wealthy individuals also embraced the trend but after the introduction of cotton, silk and other textiles in the 19th century by Arab traders its vogue declined. The bark cloth has since endured as a symbol of identity when it comes to tradition and craftmanship.

The Kisolo of the Ngonge clan is responsible for dressing the Kabaka(the King) , making and maintaining the quality of bark cloth the Kabaka wears on different occasions.

== Clan information ==
The information below is supposed to be known by all Nnonge clan members.

Clan name (Ekika)	ηηonge
Primary totem (Omuziro)	ηηonge
Secondary Totem (Akabbiro)	Kaneene
Clan Head (Ow'akasolya alias Omutaka)	Kisolo (title given to the clan head)
Clan Seat (Obutaka)	Bweza, Busujju
Clan Motto or slogan(Omubala)	Abakyanja nkette,Abakyanja nkette Mwegali mwegali Lwajali lwajali Ekirimala abasajja ziriba nnyago Beppo Ddogo Bwegalibeera amafumu tuligendana Byaddalu byaddalu Bi Nakiwala byaddalu.

== Clan roles in the Buganda kingdom ==
The Ngonge clan is also known for the discovery of the bark cloth (Olubugo). It is its royal duty to produce the bark cloth for the Buganda royal family and the Buganda royal court including the bark cloth called Luyiira that is worn by the Kabaka on his coronation ceremonies.

Wamala of the Ngonge clan is believed to have invented the skill of making of bark cloth from the Mutuba tree while hunting in a forest in Mawokota county in Buganda using a wooden harmer (mallet). Wamala presented bark cloth he had made to Ssekabaka Kimera who gave the powers to the clan of Wamala to be manufacturing the bark cloth for the Buganda's royal court.

Ssekabaka Kiggala ordered the making of two royal ivory miniature mallets to symbolise the Ngonge clan's royal duty to make the bark cloth for Buganda kingdom.

== Clan names ==
=== Ngonge clan female given names ===
Sources:

1. Namwanga
2. Nakitandwe
3. Namusisi
4. Nalule
5. Nnatuga
6. Nasunje
7. Nakisimu
8. Nakirijja
9. Nalutaya
10. Nambatya
11. Nankungu
12. Namwanga
13. Namusisi
14. Namuganga
15. Lunkuse
16. Gwokyalya
17. Nakidaali
18. Nabacwa
19. Najjemba
20. Nakiganda
21. Bakuyiita
22. Kajjenke
23. Kasisaki
24. Kwamagezi
25. Nabategere
26. Nabirongo
27. Nabisenke
28. Nakakanga
29. Nakirigya
30. Nakyanja
31. Nambatya
32. Namutibe
33. Nanjobe
34. Natoolo
35. Ndibazzi
36. Nakiwala
37. Nassonko

=== Ngonge clan male given names ===
Sources:

1. Kitumba
2. Munina
3. Katweele
4. Kivumbi
5. Ssejjemba
6. Lutaaya
7. ssenkungu
8. Buyondo
9. Musisi
10. Lutembe
11. Ssejemba
12. Bbongole
13. Biyiggisa
14. Bulemu
15. Buligi
16. Buyungo
17. Kaasandege
18. Kabinaga
19. Kaboggoza
20. Kajabaga
21. Kajwiga
22. Kakanga
23. Kaleebu
24. Kalegga
25. Kaligijjo
26. Kasaanyi
27. Katama
28. Kateeko
29. Katiginya
30. Katongero
31. Katwere
32. Kayirigo
33. Kibira
34. Kibungu
35. Kiganda
36. Kimbowa
37. Kinyira
38. Kisaabagire
39. Kisasa
40. Kitandwe
41. Kitumba
42. Kivumbi
43. Kizunga
44. Kkalaaza
45. Kyenenya
46. Lule
47. Lusambya
48. Lusekera
49. Lusse
50. Lutaaya
51. Lutembe
52. Luvuuma
53. Luyimbaazi
54. Luyinda
55. Mayito
56. Mubiina
57. Muganga
58. Muguta
59. Mulagwa
60. Mulamuzi
61. Mulimbe
62. Mulungwa
63. Musaakiriza
64. Mutawonga
65. Mutuba
66. Mutyabule
67. Muwanga
68. Namulengo
69. Namungi
70. Ndaazu
71. Ndalike
72. Nkunga
73. Nkwangu
74. Nsama
75. Sejjemba
76. Sembuuze
77. Senkungu
78. Ssekajugo
79. Ssekimbega
80. Ssekirevu
81. Ssembatya
82. Ssemugenze
83. Ssemwanga
84. Ssemwezi
85. Ssendigya
86. Ssenkuba
87. Ssewajje
88. Ssika
89. Ssonko
90. Wamala

== Clan heads ==
The clans heads/leaders are also known as Abakasolya.

1. Muwanga Ssebyooto ( Ssekabaka Kintu)
2. Kitumba( ssekabaka Kintu)
3. Kanya
4. Ssemwezi II(The second)
5. Kinyira IV(The fifth)
6. Baiwana
7. Jjemba(ssekabaka Ttembo)
8. Kitumba III(The third)
9. Kazinazina(ssekabaka Kiggala)
10. Lutaaya
11. Kityo
12. Bissoto (ssekabaka kiggala)
13. Ddamulira II (The second) (Ssekabaka Kimbugwe)
14. Lutaaya (Ssekabaka Mutebi )
15. Ssenkuba (Ssekabaka Mutebi)
16. Muwanga (Ssekabaka Kanakulya)
17. Kitumba
18. Ssenkuba II (The second)
19. Ssemwanga (Ssekabaka Mawanda)
20. Naddibanga (Ssekabaka Kyabaggu)
21. Kaleebu (Ssekabaka Tebutwereke)
22. Ssemwezi
23. Ssenkuba IV(The fifth) (Ssekabaka Tebutwereke)
24. Vvumira. (Ssekabaka Kayima)
25. Bissoto Mulwanyammuli II (The second)
26. Kinyira III (The third)
27. Kikonyongo (Ssekabaka Kanakulya)
28. Ssonko (Ssekabaka Ssemakoriro)
29. Wakyolya
30. Kivumbi
31. Kyoka oba Kyomya
32. Lule
33. Ndalike
34. Semeyi Bamutenda Mulwanya.
35. Mikayin Kaleebu (Ssekabaka Mutesa II)
36. Herbert. S. Muwanga (Kabaka Ronald Muwenda Mutebi II)
37. Mathias Kabogozza, is the current Kisolo of the Ngonge clan. (Kabaka Ronald Muwenda Mutebi II)

== See also ==
1. Buganda Kingdom
2. Lugave Clan
3. Mpindi clan
4. Clans of Buganda
