= Nte Clan =

Clan of Buganda kingdom

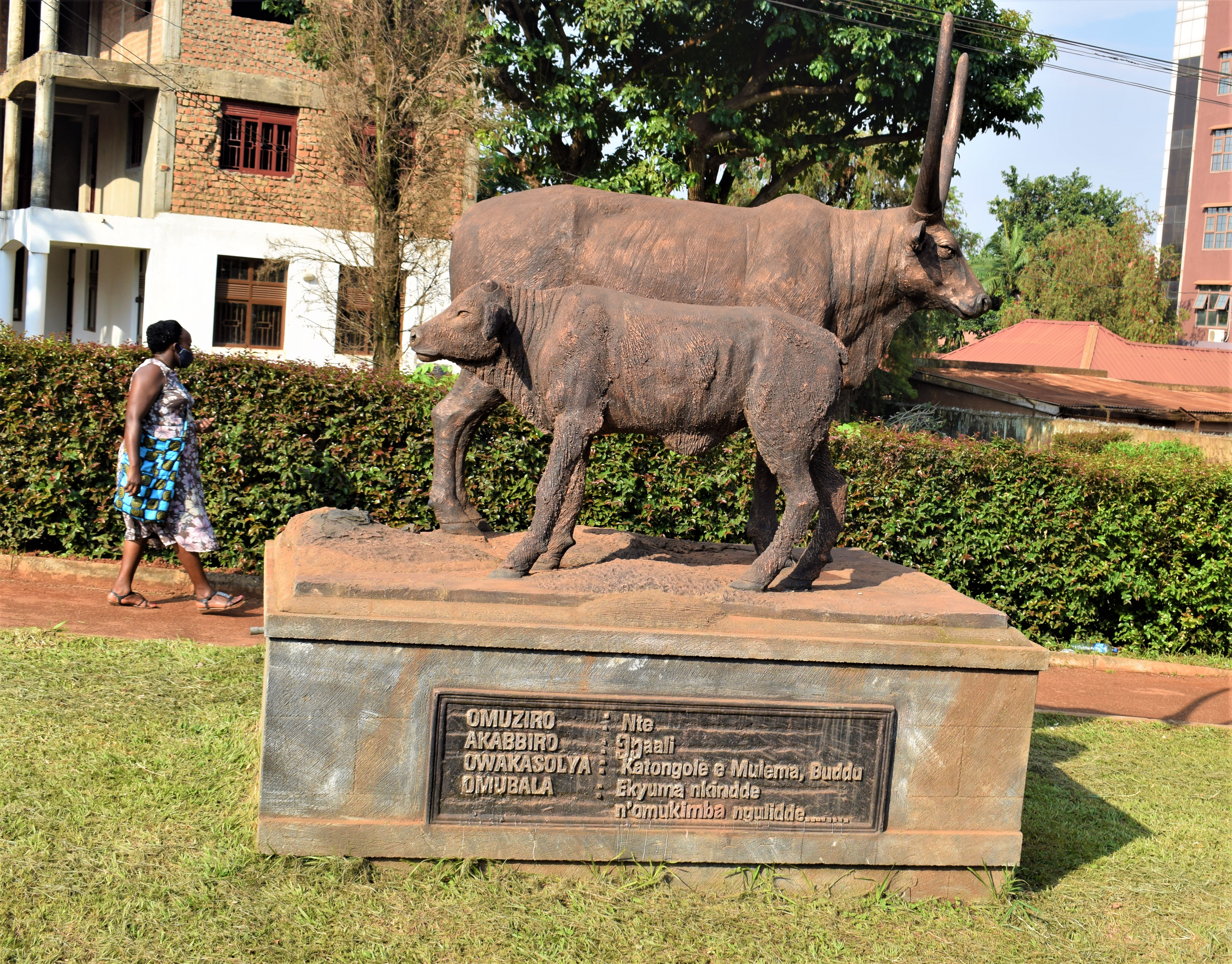
The photo shows a sculpture of Nte Clan Totem located in Mengo, Kampala.

Nte Clan is among the many clans in the present day Buganda Kingdom. Nte is a Luganda word meaning Cow. The Head of the Nte Clan is called Katongole. Katongole came from Bunyoro Kingdom. The clan seat of the Nte Clan is located at Mulema.

== Origin ==
History has it that Katongole and his brother Lukyamuzi were royal princes in the Bunyoro Kitara Kingdom. Their elder brother was the Omukama(King) at that time, who they helped take the throne in the Princely wars by making sophisticated spears and arrows that were superior to those other groups.

Katongole fell in love with the Omukama's favorite wife who then became pregnant. Upon the Omukama finding out, he became so furious that he ordered Katongole, his immediate family and whoever of the Princes/Princesses who side with him. Katongole and Lukyamuzi who were out looking for Matale stones(stones out of which metal was extracted for making spears and arrows), on their way home were informed of the Omukama's anger and the order for killing Katongole. Lukyamuzi was so close to Katongole, he decided to side with him making him to become a subject to the Omukama's harsh judgement.

The two brothers headed towards Buganda Kingdom where an ambitious Kabaka in a young Kingdom was trying to surpass Bunyoro's might through Land Conquest wars. The Kabaka welcomed them and gave them land in Ssingo where they first settled. They were also appointed as makers of spears and other metallic equipment for use in wars. The plot and price on their heads in Bunyoro still remained, so they had to move frequently and often lived in hiding. Katongole was still anxious and afraid that someday Omukama may send men to find him and his family and kill them. Because of this fear, they further headed South deep into Buganda where they entered Teero Forest and stayed there for sometime. After leaving Teero, the Kabaka offered Katongole and his family land by the river near Teero on the Shores of Lake Nalubaale(Lake Victoria). They headed further to Buddu while looking for Amatale(rock out of which iron was extracted). They settled at Bijja now Bikira from where they could go towards the shores of Lake Victoria often to find the Amatale. The Amatale was found in abundance near the shores of Lake Victoria at a place called Mulema.

Since Katongole was growing old, it was hard carrying rocks for long distances to Bijja, so he and his sons decided to settle at Mulema leaving Mutagubya and Nakana around Bijja. Mutagubya ended up at Nkenge where presently there is a seat of a Mutaba of the Nte Clan.

Katongole was laid to rest in Mulema and history says there is a big baobab tree that grew in front of his grave and still stands todate. Also it is said that Katongole's spear and ensinjo(tool used to cut hot metal) are buried at the base of this tree. This tree was used in many of the Bagabo ceremonies like the full moon celebrations. At the present date, no body is very sure of the exact spot of Katongole's grave.

== Nte Clan's Sub-clans ==
All people in the sub clans are headed by Katongole(Overall head of the Nte Clan). Each sub-clan has Bataka ba Masiga who report to Katongole and also each sub-clan observes its own rituals, customs and values. Nte Clan members are referred to Abagabo of Mulema. This name(Abagabo) originated from a long-held practice of spiritual renewal which spans three days before and three nights after the full moon.

Nte Clan has six well known common sub clans despite having many sub clans.

1. Ente eteriiko mukira oba Enkunku(Meaning tailless cow)
2. Ente ya Lubombwe
3. Ente ya Kaasa (Cow with a white spot on the head)
4. Busito (These do not drink milk from a cow that becomes in-calf again less than nine days after it gives birth)
5. Ente ya Kayinda (This is a cow that has a black back ridge running from the head to the tail)
6. Ente Erina Ekinuulo Ekiddugala Ekiganja ekimu ate ekirala nga kyeru(A cow with one part of its hoof black the other half white)

== Clan information ==
Clan	Information
Clan (Ekika)	Nte
Totem (Akabiro)	Ŋŋaali
Clan Head (Omutaka)	Katongole Muggatta
Clan Seat (Obutaka)	Mulema, Buddu
Slogan (Omubala)	1. Wante talina kabi. Mbadde ngaleeta (amata), omusumba aganywedde.; 2. Ekyuma nkiridde, n'omukimba (omusaala) ngulidde.; 3. Bwembirya, bwembiwoza, binsanga mu ssasa.

== See also ==
- Kabaka of Buganda
- Buganda Kingdom
- Mpindi Clan
- Mpologoma Clan
- Lugave Clan
- Nvubu Clan
- Njovu Clan
