= Nvuma Clan =

Clan of Buganda kingdom

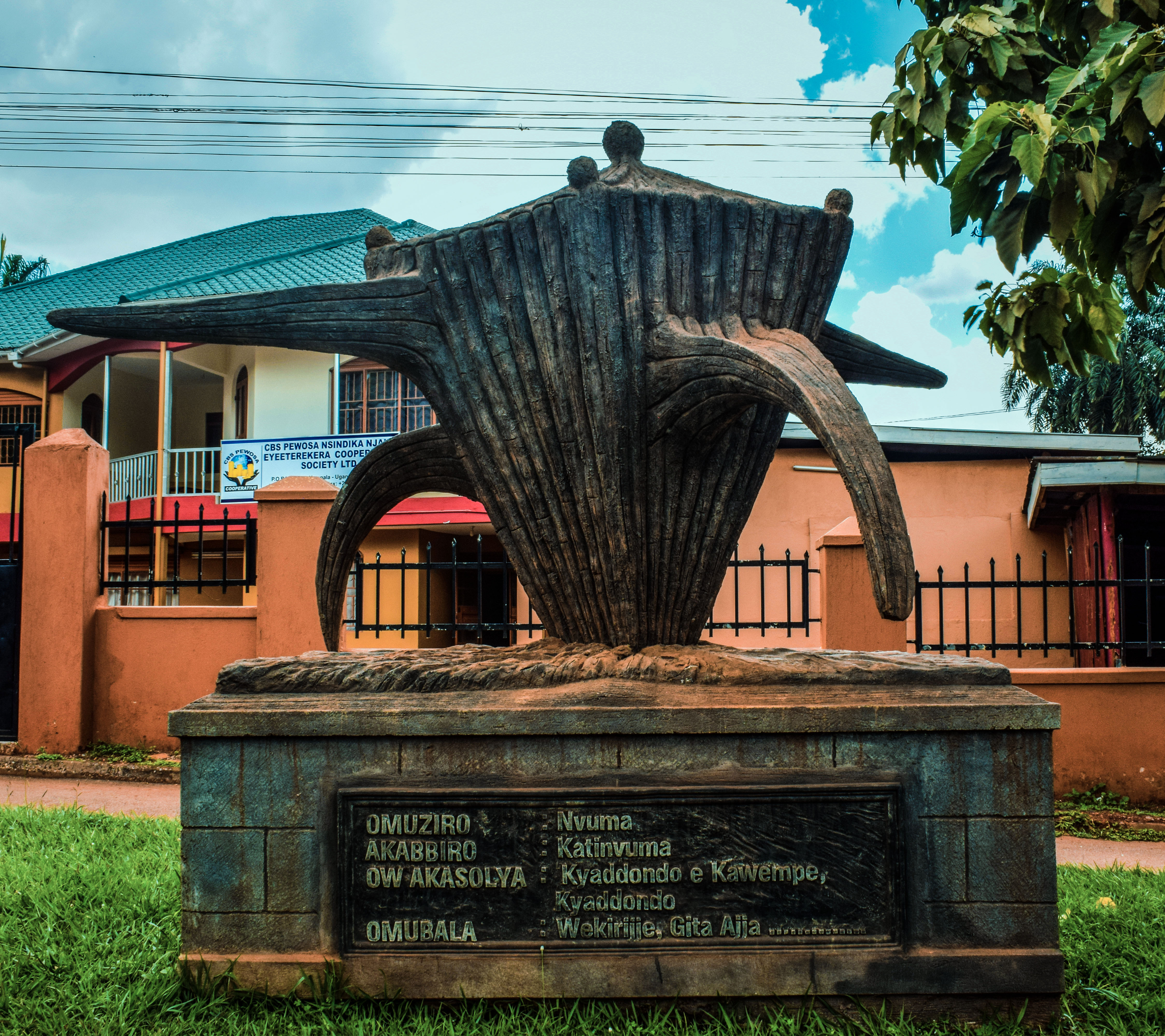
The sculpture shows the Nvuma Clan totem located in Mengo, Kampala

The Nvuma clan is believed to be one of the clans that were formed under Kabaka Kato Kintu who is regarded as the founding king of Buganda. It is among the clans in Buganda Kingdom. Nvuma is a name in Luganda which means Pearl, symbolizing value and cultural significance.

Everyone who belongs to the Buganda Kingdom belongs to a clan each having a Totem.,which serves as an important institution governing identity, kinship, marriage and cultural heritage.

== History ==
The clan started when the first Kyaddondo came to Buganda with the first Kabaka Kato Kintu. Kyaddondo was from Bubembe in the Ssese Islands and he joined forces with Kato Kintu in a major battle at Mangira in Kyaggwe against Bbemba of Buddo. For this he was rewarded by honoring him the title "Sabaddu" of Buganda.

Legend has it that one day Kyaddondo was travelling in a canoe between the island of Bubembe and Funve, he was holding the Nvuma seed which slipped and fell in the water sinking to the bottom. Kyaddondo then ordered those in his entourage as well as his children to search for the Nvuma seed until it is recovered from the water but all was in vain. So he then declared that he and every descendant will take the Nvuma as a clan totem because it took so many years before the Nvuma was ever sighted again. As a result, this was the origin of the Baganda saying "Ogutateganya teguzza Nvuma" meaning "Without hardwork, there is no reward.".This proverb reflects a broader moral teaching within Buganda culture emphasizing diligence, endurance, and determination.

== Clan organization information ==
| Clan | Information |
|---|---|
| Clan (Ekika) | Nvuma |
| Totem (Akabiro) | Katinvuma |
| Clan Head(Omutaka) | Kyaddondo |
| Clan Seat(Obutaka) | Kawempe, Kyaddondo |
| Clan Envoy(Omubaka w'Omutaka) mu UK and Ireland | Stephen Muteekaanya |
| Slogan (Omubala) | Mpaawo adduka, Mpaawo adduka, aliddayo e Kyaddondo. |

== Cultural role and significance ==
Clans in Buganda serve several important social and cultural functions, including:

- Preserving genealogical records and lineage.
- Regulating marriage, as members of the same clan are prohibited from marrying each other.
- Maitaining ancestral traditions and rituals.
- Providing social support and identity for members.
- Acting as custodian of Buganda's cultural heritage.

== See also ==
- Buganda Kingdom
- Kabaka of Buganda
- Mpologoma Clan
- Nvubu Clan
- Mpindi Clan
- Lugave Clan
