= Ssuuna II of Buganda =

Ssekabaka Ssuuna II Kalema Kasinjo

Kabaka of Buganda
- Reign: 1832 – 1856
- Predecessor: Kamaanya of Buganda
- Successor: Muteesa I of Buganda
- Born: c. 1820; Bujuuko Hill
- Died: 1856; Wamala, Kyaddondo
- Burial: Wamala, Kyaddondo
- Spouse: He married at least 148 wives
- House: Batandabezala
- Father: Kamaanya of Buganda
- Mother: Namasole Nakkazi Kannyange

Ssuuna II Kalema Kasinjo Mukaabya Sekkyungwa Muteesa Sewankambo Walugembe Mig'ekyaamye Lukeberwa Kyetutumula Magulunyondo Luwambya Omutanda Sseggwanga was the 29th Kabaka of the Kingdom of Buganda from 1832 until 1856.

His name is also spelt as Suna (in old documents) and as Suuna (in many English documents).

== Claim to the throne ==
He was born at Bujuuko Hill around 1820. He was the son of Kabaka Kamaanya Kadduwamala, Kabaka of Buganda, who reigned between 1814 and 1832. His mother was Nakkazi Kannyange, the twenty-third of his father's thirty-eight wives.

He ascended to the throne upon the death of his father in 1832, having executed all his brothers in order to remain as the sole heir.

He established his capital on Mulago Hill.

== Married life ==
Kabaka Ssuuna II continued in the tradition started by his grandfather and copied by his father; the practice of marrying an extraordinary number of wives. Ssuuna II outdid all of them. He is reported to have married one hundred and forty eight wives. Like in many areas of the world (royal intermarriage), the Kabakas of Buganda used marriage as a tool to create and cement bonds and alliances with rivals especially from the other clans of Buganda as well as important chiefs. This ensured that the next Kabaka would be a relative of anyone of Buganda's clans and possibly of an important chief. So every clan and important chief tried to ensure that one of its daughters became a wife to the current Kabaka.

== Issue ==
As expected, the Kabaka having married 148 wives, he fathered a large number of children. Written accounts put the number as high as 218 to 221 children.

- Prince (Omulangira) Kajumba
- Prince (Omulangira) Kiyimba, whose mother was Lady Zawedde
- Princess (Omumbejja) Nassuuna, whose mother was Lady Zawedde
- Prince (Omulangira) Mukaabya Walugembe, whose mother was Lady Muganzirwazza
- Prince (Omulangira) Nuhu Mbogo

This reference lists the names of all of them, giving the names of their mothers in most cases.

== Reign ==
Kabaka Ssuuna was only twelve 12 years when he ascended to the throne. He was a handsome boy, taking after the looks of his mother, Nakkazi Kannyange, reportedly one of the most beautiful women in Buganda at the time. He began as a popular monarch, loved by his people.

However, as he grew more confident, he became cocky and ruthless. He gave himself a string of names that implied invincibility and super-normal powers. He ordered the execution of fifty eight of his sixty brothers. Only two escaped the carnage:

- Prince (Omulangira) Wasajja, whose mother was Nakkazi of the Mamba clan (not Nakkazi Kannyange)
- Prince (Omulangira) Mugogo, whose mother was Kyotowadde of the Mamba clan

By the time of his death Kabaka Ssuuna II turned out to be one of the most ruthless of the Buganda kings.

Ssuuna continued the Buganda's trade in ivory and slaves with Zanzibar and for a time allowed foreign traders mainly Zanzibaris and Arabs like Snay bin Amir (in 1852) and Ahmed bin Ibrahim (in 1844), in his kingdom. The Arab traders supplied cloth (cotton and silk), firearms, ammunition, etc. However, the introduction of large quantities of cotton cloth gradually led to the decline in the use of Barkcloth. Barkcloth had been the main clothing worn by people in the region. Ssuuna eventually banned entry of all foreign traders in Buganda.

Ssuuna increased Buganda's naval fleet and expansion in Lake Nnalubaale.

The wars of conquest against the Kingdom's neighbors continued during his reign which led to an expansion of the territory of the Buganda Kingdom.

During his reign, the neglect of sanitary standards within the capital was decreed an offence punishable by death. Ssuuna put a number of persons to death for breach of his rules, which aroused the ire of a certain medium named Kigemuzi. Kigemuzi began to speak disrespectfully of the King, saying that he did so by order of the gods. On Ssuuna's orders, Kigemuzi was arrested and taken to the capital, contrary to the custom. He protested before the Kabaka, reminding him it was contrary to custom to bind a medicine-man or a medium. The King then ordered Kigemuzi to be removed, and that night the royal house was struck by lightning, and the King was scorched on his face and on one side of his body. Ssuuna at once sent for the medium Kigemuzi, released him, and asked him why there had been this storm. The medium answered: "Because the god of thunder (Kiwanuka) is angry at what you have done to me." The King then presented the man with cattle to make atonement for binding him, and the King's mother settled him on a large tract of land, in order to propitiate the gods, and to save her son from further harm.

== Final years ==
In his final years, Kabaka Ssuuna sent an emissary to the king of Buzongola. On his return, the emissary delivered a less than flattering message from Buzongola. Ssuuna took this as a slight and waged war against the kingdom of Buzongola. The Katikiro, Kayira, the Kabaka's great chiefs and the Queen mother all advised against embarking on a military campaign in a time of famine and small pox. The Kabaka proceeded with the ill advised war.

Despite emerging victorious and driving out the king of Buzongola, the combined effects of war, smallpox and famine greatly weakened his armies and most of his men died before reaching Buganda. Kabaka Ssuuna II died of smallpox on his way back to Buganda in October 1856. Kayiira brought his remains back to Nabulagala. His remains are currently buried at Wamala.

== Quotes ==
"He was a very cruel man: he was brave in war, he was a hunter of wild animals and very fond of hunting dogs. At times, however, he was kind, so they say, and it is well known that cruel kings at times exercise kindness so that they shall not be hated by their subjects. Such was Ssuuna."

- Ham Mukasa, "Some Notes on the Reign of Mutesa", 1934

"When he was reprimanded by Ahmed bin Ibrahim (the first Arab to visit Ssuuna II's court in 1844) over the wanton killing of his subjects, Ssuuna filed the following defence; 'I have no other secret for keeping my subjects in awe of me and in preventing conspiracies'."

- John A. Rowe, Revolution in Buganda, 1968

== Wamala tombs ==
Wamala is the sacred burial place of Kabaka Ssuuna II, who was the last Kabaka to be buried in his own palace and the last to have his jaw bone removed after death. It is located on a hilltop about 2.5 kilometres (1.6 mi) off Hoima Road.

== See also ==
- Kabaka of Buganda
- Mulago Hill

Preceded by Kamaanya Kadduwamala	King of Buganda; 1832 – 1856	Succeeded by Muteesa I Mukaabya
