= Nuhu Mbogo Kyabasinga =

Ugandan Muslim leader

Nuhu Mbogo
- Mbogo Kyabasinga
- Born: 1835; Mengo, Buganda
- Died: 26 September 1921 (aged 85–86)
- Burial place: Kawempe, Mbogo-Kampala
- Other name: Kyabasinga
- Occupation: Ugandan Muslim leader
- Known for: Islamic activism
- Successor: Badru Kakungulu

Nuhu Mbogo Kyabasinga (1835–1921) was a prince of the Buganda Kingdom, known for his prominent role in the Muslim community of Uganda. He was born to Kabaka (king) SSuuna Kalema II and his wife Kubina and was a notable figure during his time. Mbogo was also the brother of Kabaka Muteesa I, who was another important figure in the Buganda Kingdom. Mbogo made contributions to the development of Islam in Uganda.

== Early life ==
Nuhu Mbogo Kyabasinga was a prince (Mulangila) of the Buganda Kingdom who was born in 1835 to Kabaka Ssuuna II and Kubina, his wife. Kyabasinga grew up in a royal household and received a formal education. He developed a keen interest in Islam from a young age and became an active participant in the Muslim community of Uganda, eventually rising to a position of leadership within the community. Kyabasinga was widely regarded as an intelligent and pious figure, whose commitment to his faith had a significant impact on the development of Islam in Uganda.

== Mbogo and Islam in Uganda ==
Nuhu Mbogo Kyabasinga, commonly known as Mbogo, was an important figure in the history of Islam in Uganda. Mbogo was born into a prominent Buganda royal family in 1835 and was known for his interest in Islam from a young age. He converted to Islam and became an active member of the Muslim community in Uganda. Mbogo traveled to the East African coast in the 1860s, where he studied Islamic theology and Arabic. He returned to Uganda and became a respected teacher and preacher within the Muslim community. Mbogo's efforts were crucial to the establishment of the Uganda Muslim Association (UMA) in 1900, the first formal organization for Muslims in Uganda. He served as the first president of the UMA. Throughout his life, Mbogo was committed to promoting Islam among his fellow Ugandans and played a significant role in the growth and development of the religion in the country. He is widely regarded as one of the most important figures in the history of Islam in Uganda.

== Mbogo in exile ==
In the late 1880s, Nuhu Mbogo Kyabasinga became embroiled in a power struggle between the Buganda Kingdom and the neighboring kingdom of Bunyoro-Kitara. Mbogo was accused of collaborating with Bunyoro-Kitara and was subsequently charged with treason by his nephew (King) Kabaka Mwanga II, the King of Buganda. In 1888, Mbogo was exiled to the island of Bukasa an island on Lake Victoria, where he remained for nearly ten years. Despite his exile, Mbogo continued to promote Islam and maintain his connections with the wider Muslim world.

Mbogo's exile was lifted in 1897, following a change in the political climate. He returned to Buganda and resumed his position as a leader in the Muslim community. Mbogo's exile and subsequent return are seen as important parts of his legacy and contributed to his reputation as a brave and committed leader.

Throughout his life, Mbogo remained dedicated to promoting Islam and supporting the interests of his fellow Muslims. Despite the hardships he faced during his exile, Mbogo's commitment to his faith and his resilience in the face of adversity made him a revered figure in the history of Islam in Uganda.

== Religious wars in Uganda ==
Nuhu Mbogo Kyabasinga was involved in several religious conflicts and wars in Uganda, particularly those between Islam and Christianity. He played a key role in the Muslim resistance against Kabaka Mwanga II's attempts to suppress Islam in the Buganda Kingdom in the late 19th century. Mbogo was accused of collaborating with the neighboring kingdom of Bunyoro-Kitara and exiled in 1888, but returned to Buganda in 1897. In the early 20th century, Mbogo rescinded his claim to the throne to become a leader for Muslims under the British administration of the Protectorate of Uganda. Through working directly with British colonial administrators and the Christian majority of Uganda, Mbogo was widely recognized as the utmost authority on the governance of Islam in Uganda.

== Death ==
Nuhu Mbogo Kyabasinga, a prominent leader in the Muslim community in Uganda, died on 26 September 1921, at the age of 86. His funeral was attended by a large number of people, including members of the Buganda royal family, representatives from the Muslim community, and local and national political figures. Mbogo's legacy continued to be celebrated following his death, as he was remembered as a champion of social justice and human rights. He was buried in accordance with Islamic customs in the Muslim cemetery in Kampala. Today, Mbogo is widely recognized as one of the most important figures in the history of Islam in Uganda.

== Mbogo Mosque ==
Ugandan Muslims from Kawempe, the area where Mbogo was buried in a royal tomb, built one of the biggest mosques in the country as a memorial for Nuhu Mbogo. The mosques is named Mbogo Mosque.
