= Kamaanya of Buganda =

Ssekabaka Kamaanya Kadduwamala

Kabaka of Buganda
- Reign: 1814 – 1832
- Predecessor: Semakookiro of Buganda
- Successor: Suuna II of Buganda
- Born: Uganda
- Died: 1832; Lutengo
- Burial: Kasengejje, Busiro
- Spouse: 1. Lady Baakuyiira; 2. Lady Basiima Mukooki; 3. Lady Gwowemukira; 4. Lady Kayaga; 5. Lady Kisirisa; 6. Naabakyaala Saamanya, the Kaddulubaale; 7. Lady Ky'osiby'omunyolo; 8. Lady Kyot'owadde; 9. Lady Kyowol'otudde; 10. Lady Lubadde; 11. Lady Mpozaaki; 12. Lady Mubyuwo?; 13. Lady Muteezi; 14. Lady Mukwaano; 15. Lady Nambi; 16. Naabakyaala Nabikuku, the Kabejja; 17. Lady Nabirumbi; 18. Lady Nabiswaazi; 19. Lady Nabyonga; 20. Lady Nabbowa; 21. Lady Nakaddu; 22. Lady Nakanyike; 23. Lady Nakkazi Kannyange; 24. Lady Nakkazi; 25. Lady Nakku; 26. Lady Nakyekoledde; 27. Lady Nalumansi; 28. Lady Namale; 29. Lady Namukasa; 30. Lady Namawuba; 31. Lady Nambi Tebasaanidde; 32. Lady Namwenyagira; 33. Lady Nannozi; 34. Lady Nankanja; 35. Lady Nzaalambi; 36. Lady Siribatwaalira; 37. Lady Tebeemalizibwa; 38. Lady Nanteza
- Father: Semakookiro of Buganda
- Mother: Abakyala Nansikombi Ndwadd'ewazibwa

Kamaanya Kadduwamala was the 28th Kabaka of the Kingdom of Buganda, who ruled from 1814 until 1832.

== Claim to the throne ==
He was the eldest son of Kabaka Semakookiro Wasajja Nabbunga, Kabaka of Buganda, who reigned between 1797 and 1814. His mother was Nansikombi Ndwaddeewaaziba, the Kaddulubaale, of the Nseenene (Grasshopper) Clan. She was his father's first wife. His father married at least fifteen wives. He ascended to the throne upon the death of his father in 1814, assuming the name of Kamaanya. He established his capital at Nsujjumpolu.

== Married life ==
Like his father, Kabaka Kamaanya had many wives. He is recorded to have married at least thirty eight (38) wives:

1. Baakuyiira, daughter of Lule, of the Ngonge clan
2. Basiima Mukooki, daughter of Kateesigwa, of the Nkima clan
3. Gwowemukira
4. Kayaga, daughter of Kiwaalabye, of the Kkobe clan
5. Kisirisa, daughter of Walusimbi, of the Ffumbe clan
6. Naabakyaala Saamanya, the Kaddulubaale, daughter of Walusimbi, of the Ffumbe clan. She was killed on the orders of her husband.
7. Ky'osiby'omunyolo, daughter of Jjumba, of the Nkima clan
8. Kyot'owadde, daughter of Kiyaga, of the Mamba clan
9. Kyowol'otudde, daughter of Lutalo, of the Ndiga clan
10. Lubadde, daughter of Majanja, of the Ngeye clan
11. Mpozaaki, daughter of Kateesigwa, of the Nkima clan
12. Mubyuwo?, daughter of Nakatanza, of the Lugave clan
13. Muteezi, daughter of Nakato, of the Mbogo clan
14. Mukwaano, daughter of Mugema, of the Nkima clan
15. Nambi, daughter of Lutaaya, of the Ngonge clan
16. Naabakyaala Nabikuku, the Kabejja, daughter of Jjumba, of the Nkima clan
17. Nabirumbi, daughter of Kisuule of Busoga, of the Njaza (Reedbuck) clan
18. Nabiswaazi, daughter of Jjumba, of the Nkima clan
19. Nabyonga, daughter of Mwamba?, of the Lugave clan
20. Nabbowa, daughter of Kafumbirwango, of the Lugave clan
21. Nakaddu, daughter of Kamyuuka, of the Kkobe clan
22. Nakanyike, daughter of Senfuma, of the Mamba clan
23. Nakkazi Kannyange, daughter of Ssambwa Katenda, of the Mamba clan
24. Nakkazi, daughter of Lutalo, of the Mamba clan
25. Nakku, daughter of Walusimbi, of the Ffumbe clan
26. Nakyekoledde, daughter of Gabunga, of the Mamba clan
27. Nalumansi, daughter of Walusimbi, of the Ffumbe clan
28. Namale, daughter of Kiwalabye, of the Kkobe clan
29. Namukasa, daughter of Nankere, of the Mamba clan
30. Namawuba, daughter of Sempala, of the Ffumbe clan
31. Nambi Tebasaanidde, daughter of Mugula, of the Mamba clan
32. Namwenyagira, daughter of Kamyuuka, of the Kkobe clan
33. Nannozi, daughter of Gomottoka, of the Nvubu clan
34. Nankanja, daughter of Terwewalwa, of the Nvubu clan
35. Nzaalambi, daughter of Natiigo, of the Lugave clan
36. Siribatwaalira, of the Nkima clan
37. Tebeemalizibwa, daughter of Mwamba?, of the Lugave clan
38. Nanteza

== Issue ==
He is recorded to have fathered sixty one (61) sons and several daughters. His son Suuna II, executed fifty eight (58) of his brothers during his reign. The children of Kabaka Kamaanya included:

1. Prince (Omulangira) Kiggala I, whose mother was Baakuyiira
2. Prince (Omulangira) Nakibinge Bawuunyakangu, whose mother was Saamanya. He was killed by being burned alive, on the orders of his father at Busonyi, Busujju County.
3. Prince (Omulangira) Kimera, whose mother was Gwowemukira
4. Prince (Omulangira) Ndawula, whose mother was Gwowemukira
5. Prince (Omulangira) Lule, whose mother was Gwowemukira
6. Prince (Omulangira) Kiggala II, whose mother was Gwowemukira
7. Prince (Omulangira) Kitereera, whose mother was Gwowemukira
8. Princess (Omumbejja) Babirye, whose mother was Kayaga. Twin with Princess Nakato
9. Princess (Omumbejja) Nakato, whose mother was Kayaga. Twin with Princess Nakato
10. Prince (Omulangira) Kaggwa, whose mother was Kisirisa
11. Prince (Omulangira) Bagunyeenyamangu, whose mother was Saamanya
12. Prince (Omulangira) Mbajjwe, whose mother was Ky'osiby'omunyolo).
13. Prince (Omulangira) Bamweyana, whose mother was Kyootowadde
14. Prince (Omulangira) Twaayise, whose mother was Mpozaaki
15. Prince (Omulangira) Kyomubi, whose mother was Mukwaano
16. Prince (Omulangira) Luwedde, whose mother was Nabiswaazi
17. Prince (Omulangira) Kimera, whose mother was Nabbowa
18. Prince (Omulangira) Lumansi, whose mother was Nakaddu
19. Prince (Omulangira) Tebandeke, whose mother was Nakanyike
20. Prince (Omulangira) Suuna Kalema Kansinjo, who succeeded as Kabaka Suuna II Kalema Kansinjo Mukaabya Ssekkyungwa Muteesa I Sewankambo Walugembe Mig'ekyaamye Lukeberwa Kyetutumula Magulunnyondo Lubambula Omutanda Sseggwanga, whose mother was Nakkazi Kannyange
21. Prince (Omulangira) Wasajja, whose mother was Nakkazi. He escaped the slaughter of the princes by his brother, Suuna II.
22. Prince (Omulangira) Ndawula, whose mother was Nakyekoledde
23. Prince (Omulangira) Mutebi, whose mother was Nakyekoledde
24. Prince (Omulangira) Mugogo, whose mother was Kyotowadde. He too, escaped the slaughter of the princes by his brother, Suuna II.
25. Prince (Omulangira) Kigoye, whose mother was Namale
26. Princess (Omumbejja) Ndagire I, whose mother was Namukasa
27. Prince (Omulangira) Waswa, whose mother was Nambi Tebasaanidde. Twin with Babirye.
28. Princess (Omumbejja) Babirye, whose mother was Nambi Tebasaanidde. Twin with Babirye
29. Prince (Omulangira) Kajumba, whose mother was Nambi Tebasaanidde
30. Princess (Omumbejja) Ndagire II, whose mother was Nannozi
31. Prince (Omulangira) Kizza, whose mother was Nzaalambi
32. Princess (Omumbejja) Tajuba, whose mother was Lubadde. She died after 1927.
33. Princess (Omumbejja) Nassolo, whose mother Mubyuwo?
34. Princess (Omumbejja) Nambi, whose mother was Muteezi
35. Princess (Omumbejja) Nakayenga, whose mother was Kyowol'otudde
36. Princess (Omumbejja) Namayanja, whose mother was Lubadde
37. Princess (Omumbejja) Nabaloga, whose mother was Mpozaaki
38. Princess (Omumbejja) Kagere, whose mother was Mubyuwo
39. Princess (Omumbejja) Mwannyin'empologoma Nassolo, whose mother was Nabikuku
40. Princess (Omumbejja) Nalumansi, whose mother was Nabirumbi
41. Princess (Omumbejja) Nakku, whose mother was Nabyonga
42. Princess (Omumbejja) Nakalema, whose mother was Nalumansi
43. Princess (Omumbejja) Nakangu, whose mother was Nambi
44. Princess (Omumbejja) Namika, whose mother was Nakaddu
45. Princess (Omumbejja) Nakabiri, whose mother was Namwenyagira
46. Princess (Omumbejja) Katalina Nabisubi Mpalikitenda Nakayenga, whose mother was Siribatwaalira. She was born around 1814. She died on 27 January 1907.
47. Princess (Omumbejja) Lwantale, whose mother was Siribatwaalira. She was the Naalinnya to Kabaka Suuna II. She died in March 1881.
48. Princess (Omumbejja) Nagaddya, whose mother was Tebeemalizibwa
49. Princess (Omumbejja) Nassuuna Kyetenga, whose mother was Nankanja

== His reign ==
Kabaka Kamaanya continued the wars of conquest against the Kingdom's neighbors which led to an expansion of the territory of the Buganda Kingdom. He conquered the ssaza, Buweekula, from Bunyoro and annexed it to Buganda.

== The final years ==
Kabaka Kamaanya died at Lutengo in 1832. He was buried at Kasengejje, Busiro.

== Quotes ==
It is claimed that Kamanya’s original name was Kanakulya Mukasa. But because he was such a tyrant, his contemporaries began to refer to a person of uncontrollable temper with a persecution mania (and indirectly to the king) as a kamanya.

- MM Semakula Kiwanuka, A History of Buganda, 1971

== See also ==
- Kabaka of Buganda

Preceded by Semakookiro Wasajja Nabbunga	King of Buganda; 1814 – 1832	Succeeded by Suuna II Kalema
