= Kyabaggu of Buganda =

Ssekabaka Kyabaggu Kabinuli

Kabaka of Buganda
- Reign: 1750 – 1780
- Predecessor: Namuggala of Buganda
- Successor: Jjunju of Buganda
- Born: Uganda
- Died: 1780; Namubiru
- Burial: Kyebando
- Spouse: 1. Lady Gwolyoowa; 2. Lady Kiriibwa; 3. Lady Magota; 4. Lady Misinga; 5. Lady Mbigidde; 6. Lady Nabiweke; 7. Lady Nabugere; 8. Lady Nagalaale; 9. Naabakyaala Najjemba; 10. Lady Nalubimbi; 11. Lady Nalugooti; 12. Lady Nalunga; 13. Lady Nalwondooba; 14. Lady Namayanja; 15. Lady Nambooze; 16. Lady Nankanja; 17. Lady Nanteza; 18. Lady Nfambe; 19. Lady Nanzigu; 20. Lady Nakalyoowa.
- Father: Prince Musanje Golooba
- Mother: Namasole Nabulya Naluggwa

Kyabaggu Kabinuli was Kabaka of the Kingdom of Buganda from 1750 until 1780. He was the twenty-fifth (25th) Kabaka of Buganda.

== Claim to the throne ==
He was the third son of Prince Musanje Golooba. His mother was Nabulya Naluggwa of the Ndiga (Sheep) clan, the second (2nd) of his father's three (3) wives. He ascended to the throne upon the abdication of his elder brother Kabaka Namuggala in 1750. He established his capital at Lubya Hill.

== Married life ==
He is recorded to have married twenty (20) wives:

1. Gwolyoowa, daughter Myamba, of the Lugave clan
2. Kiriibwa, daughter of Sebugulu, of the Lugave clan
3. Magota, daughter of Namukoka, of the Mamba clan
4. Misinga, daughter of Natiigo, of the Lugave clan
5. Mbigidde, daughter of Terwewalwa, of the Nvuma clan
6. Nabiweke, daughter of Seggiriinya, of the Ngo clan
7. Nabugere, daughter of Sekayiba, of the Ffumbe clan
8. Nagalaale, daughter of Lule, of the Ngonge clan
9. Naabakyaala Najjemba, the Omubikka, daughter of Lule, of the Ngonge clan
10. Nalubimbi, daughter of Namwaama, of the Kkobe clan
11. Nalugooti, daughter of Masembe, of the Nsenene clan
12. Nalunga, daughter of Lugunju, of the Nvuma clan
13. Nalwondooba, daughter of Nankere, of the Mamba clan
14. Namayanja, daughter of Budde, of the Mamba clan. She killed her husband in a rage in 1750, prior to marrying the Kabaka.
15. Nambooze, daughter of Namwaama, of the Kkobe clan
16. Nankanja, daughter of Nakabalira, of the Nvuma clan
17. Nanteza, daughter of Kakembo, of the Njovu clan
18. Nfambe, daughter of Sekayiba, of the Ffumbe clan
19. Nanzigu
20. Nakalyoowa.

== Issue ==
Kabaka Kyabaggu fathered many children. Among his children are the following:

1. Prince (Omulangira) Sanya, whose mother was Misinga
2. Prince (Omulangira) Mbajjwe, whose mother was Nabugere
3. Prince (Omulangira) Saku, whose mother was Nalubimbi
4. Prince (Omulangira) Wango, whose mother was Nalwondooba
5. Prince (Omulangira) Kalema, whose mother was Nambooze. He contested the succession on the death of his father. Defeated by his brother, Jjunju, and fled to Bunyoro
6. Prince (Omulangira) Kibuli
7. Prince (Omulangira) Kigoye, whose mother was Nambooze
8. Prince (Omulangira) Lubambula.
9. Prince (Omulangira) Mukama. He rebelled against his half-brother, Kabaka Jjunju. He was killed by his half-brother, Prince Semakookiro, after 1780.
10. Prince (Omulangira) Wakayima. Prince Wakayima was the father of Prince (Omulangira) Sewaya.
11. Kabaka Junju Sendegeya, Kabaka of Buganda from 1780 to 1797, whose mother was Nanteza.
12. Kabaka Semakookiro Wasajja Nabbunga, Kabaka of Buganda between 1797 and 1814, whose mother was Nanteza.
13. Prince (Omulangira) Sekafuuwa, whose mother was Namayanja. He was killed in battle at Mulago, by his half-brother, Prince Wakayima, in 1780.
14. Prince (Omulangira) Kiribatta, whose mother was Namayanja. He was killed in battle at Mulago, by his half-brother, Kabaka Jjunju, in 1780.
15. Prince (Omulangira) Kikunta, whose mother was Namayanja. He was killed in battle at Mulago, by his half-brother, Kabaka Junju, in 1780.
16. Princess (Omumbejja) Nsekere, whose mother was Gwolyoowa
17. Princess (Omumbejja) Nalukwaakula, whose mother was Nagalaale
18. Princess (Omumbejja) Nakayiza
19. Princess (Omumbejja) Zansanze, whose mother was Nanteza

== The final years ==
Kabaka Kyabaggu was killed by Kikoso, valet to Nakirindisa, at Namubiru, in 1780. He was initially buried at Mereera. In 1869, his remains were exhumed and re-buried at Kyebando.

== See also ==
- Kabaka of Buganda
- Muwenda Mutebi II of Buganda

Preceded by Namuggala Kagali	King of Buganda c.1750–c.1780	Succeeded by Jjunju Sendegeya
