= Jjunju of Buganda =

Ssekabaka Jjunju Sendegeya

Kabaka of Buganda
- Reign: 1780 – 1797
- Predecessor: Kyabaggu of Buganda
- Successor: Semakookiro of Buganda
- Born: Uganda
- Died: 1797; Kiwawu
- Burial: Luwunga, Busiro
- Spouse: 1. Lady Katagya; 2. Lady Nakamu I 3. Lady Nakamu II; 4. Lady Tebwaaza
- Father: Kyabaggu of Buganda
- Mother: Namasole Nanteza

Jjunju Sendegeya was Kabaka of the Kingdom of Buganda from 1780 until 1797. He was the twenty-sixth (26th) Kabaka of Buganda.

== Claim to the throne ==
He was the son of Kabaka Kyabaggu Kabinuli, Kabaka of Buganda, who reigned between 1750 and 1780. His mother was Nanteza, the seventeenth (17th) of his father's seventeen (17) wives. He ascended to the throne upon the death of his father. He established his capital at Magonga.

== Married life ==
He is recorded to have married four wives:

- Katagya, daughter of Gabunga, of the Mamba clan
- Nakamu I, daughter of Lwowa, of the Ndiga clan
- Nakamu II, daughter of Katambala, of the Ndiga clan
- Tebwaaza, daughter of Kasamba, of the Mbogo clan

== Issue ==
He is recorded to have fathered three children; one son and two daughters:

- Prince (Omulangira) Semalume, whose mother was Nakamu I
- Princess (Omumbejja) Nakabiri, whose mother is not mentioned
- Princess (Omumbejja) Kyomubi, whose mother was Katagya

== His reign ==
During his reign, Buganda conquered Buddu (in present-day Masaka District) from Bunyoro. The reason for the conquest was probably because of how wealthy the region was in resources. He also conquered Kooki and Kabula, greatly extending the kingdom's boundaries and influence in the region of Kitara. He was renowned as a great general by his peers. The cities he conquered were rich in resources like cattle, iron ore, and backcloth which were essential to the kingdom's economy. The campaigns led to the increase in wealth for Buganda. His reign was interrupted by the struggle between him and his brother Prince Semakookiro, who rebelled against him. During the rebellion, Semakookiro ordered his men to go and capture Kabaka Jjunju and bring him to the rebel prince. The expedition went badly. Kabaka Jjunju was killed during the attempted capture.

He was an exceptionally good general, but cruel and bloodthirsty. His contemporaries remembered him for two things: the countless numbers of people he executed and the terrible wars he waged either in defence of his throne or in endeavouring to expand his country's frontiers.

— MM Semakula Kiwanuka.

When the regiment sent to capture the Kabaka came back to report that they had killed him, Semakookiro was so upset that he expelled all the regiment members together with their families and friends from Buganda, or else they would suffer the same fate as his brother. The expelled people fled Buganda and went westwards to present day Kitagwenda District and Bunyaruguru in Rubirizi District, Western Uganda.

This group of descendants were the reason why Kitagwenda and Bunyaruguru are called thus today. Batagwenda seems to mean those who cannot go further and Banyaruguru means those with strong-legs. Indeed, Kitagwenda is east of Bunyaruguru and is a plain area while Bunyaruguru is a hilly area west of Kitagwenda. Those without strong legs stayed in Kitagwenda and those who moved on and climbed the hills became the Banyaruguru.

== The final years ==
He was killed in the Battle of Kiwawu, against his brother Semakookiro, in 1797. He was buried at Luwunga, Busiro.

Another version of the death of Junju is that he was killed by the then Baganda of Ssese Islands, known as the Abalunyanja, Abakenye, Abakunta, Abasese following a disagreement that erupted as a result of mistreatment. The aggrieved group fled to the east escaping from the attacks that were being planned by the mainland Baganda. When they reached the area of present-day Busoga and Samia region, the natives of this area the Samia welcomed these migrants from the Buganda Kingdom by saying in the Samia Lugwe dialect Abahenyi ba kabaka baidire meaning that the visitors from the kingdom of Buganda have arrived. This is how these migrants are said to have acquired the name of their tribe Bakenye. The word "Bagenye" meant "visitors" according to the natives of this area-the Samia Bagwe. The migrants settled down in this area, carried out fishing activities around the water bodies of this area such as river Majanji, intermarried with the natives and took on new names, for example: For men Musana, Wegulo, Wankya, Njaye, Kifuko, Mwambazi, Mukadiyo, Galaama, Mufumu, Waitago, Gabulugo, Kajaye, Byekwaso, Wamulanga, Kirya, Divo, Wabwire, Mugote to mention but a few, and for the Bakenye women they took on names such as Gabeya, Namusana, Sana, Nawegulo, Kasuubi, Gamba, Nankya, Nekesa, Ikesa, Nabwire, Nabuudo to mention but a few. This deemed to be a strategy employed by the Bakenye migrants oto conceal themselves from the wrath of the agents of the Kabaka of Buganda who these migrants knew they were pursuing them whenever they settled down.

These migrants also adopted the cultures of the natives and the Lukenye language became partly assimilated and associated with the Samia and Lusoga. Today these migrants are known as Bakenyi or Bakenye. The Bakenyi can be found among the Baganga, Basoga, Bagwere, Balamogi, Banyoli, Baruli, Banyala and Samia ethnic Bantu speaking ethnic tribes. Some Bakenye migrants have preserved their Kiganda culture and traditions by naming their offspring according to Baganda tradition, for example Baganda names used by the Bakenye are Musoke, Namusoke,Mubiru, Namubiru, Bukenya, Nabukenya, Nakachwa, Mukasa, Namukasa, Musisi, Namusisi to mention but a few; members of the Ngo Clan (Leopard Clan) renamed themselves the Babango (a Bakenye clan), and changed their totem to the Guinea Fowl (Nkofu). The Ngabi Clan (Water buck clan) became the Bakoma (a Bakenye clan) and the Bagulu (a Bakenye clan).

== See also ==
- Kabaka of Buganda

| Preceded by Kyabaggu Kabinuli | King of Buganda c.1780–c.1797 | Succeeded by Semakookiro Wasajja Nabbunga |
