= Semakookiro of Buganda =

Ssekabaka Semakookiro Wasajja Nabbunga

Kabaka of Buganda
- Reign: 1797 – 1814
- Predecessor: Jjunju of Buganda
- Successor: Kamaanya of Buganda
- Born: Uganda
- Died: 1814; Kasangati, Kyaddondo, Uganda
- Burial: Kisimbiri, Busiro
- Spouse: 1. Naabakyaala Nansikombi Ndwadd'ewazibwa, the Kaddulubaale; 2. Lady Balambi; 3. Lady Bawedde; 4. Lady Bwaayita; 5. Lady Guluma; 6. Lady Gwowoleza; 7. Lady Jajjaw'abaana; 8. Nabakyaala Kikubula Nassaza; 9. Lady Nabisunsa; 10. Lady Namatama; 11. Lady Seb'andabawa; 12. Naabakyaala Sirisa, Kabejja; 13. Lady Sikyayinza; 14. Naabakyaala Namisango, the Nnabagereka; 15. Naabakyaala Nasuzewabi
- Father: Kyabaggu of Buganda
- Mother: Namasole Nanteza

Semakookiro, also spelled as Ssemakookiro, whose full name is Semakookiro Wasajja Nabbunga, was Kabaka of the Kingdom of Buganda, from 1797 until 1814. He was the twenty-seventh (27th) Kabaka of Buganda.

== Claim to the throne ==
He was the son of Kabaka Kyabaggu Kabinuli, Kabaka of Buganda, who reigned between 1750 and 1780. His mother was Nanteza, the seventeenth (17th) of his father's twenty (20) wives. He ascended the throne after the death of his brother, Kabaka Jjunju Sendegeya, whom Semakookiro defeated and killed in the Battle of Kiwawu in 1797. He established his capital at Kasangati.

== Married life ==
He is recorded to have married fifteen (15) wives:

1. Naabakyaala Nansikombi Ndwadd'ewazibwa, the Kaddulubaale, daughter of Luyombo, of the Nsenene (Grasshopper) clan
2. Balambi, daughter of Sembuzi, of the Ndiga clan
3. Bawedde, daughter of Nakato, of the Mbogo clan
4. Bwaayita, daughter of Jjumba, of the Nkima clan
5. Guluma, daughter of Lusinga, of the Ntalaganya clan
6. Gwowoleza, daughter of Luzige, of the Ndiga clan
7. Jajjaw'abaana, daughter of Serusa, of the Ndiga clan
8. Naabakyaala Kikubula, Nassaza, daughter of Luzige, of the Ndiga clan
9. Nabisunsa, daughter of Mukusu, of the Mpindi clan
10. Namatama, daughter of Malunda, of the Ndiga clan
11. Seb'andabawa, daughter of Nkali, of the Ngeye clan
12. Naabakyaala Sirisa, Kabejja, daughter of Sekiwedde, of the Mamba clan
13. Sikyayinza, daughter of Jjumba, of the Nkima clan
14. Naabakyaala Namisango, Naabagereka, daughter of Luyombo, of the Nsenene (Grasshopper) clan
15. Naabakyaala Nasuzewabi, daughter of Bunnya, of the Nsenene clan

== Issue ==
The children of Kabaka Semakookiro included the following:

1. Prince (Omulangira) Kanaakulya Mukasa, who succeeded his father as Kabaka Kamaanya Kadduwamala, Kabaka of Buganda, whose mother was Ndwadd'ewazibwa
2. Princess (Omumbejja) Ndagire, whose mother was Ndwadd'ewazibwa
3. Prince (Omulangira) Luyenje, whose mother was Bawedde
4. Prince (Omulangira) Tebattagwaabwe, whose mother was Bwaayita
5. Prince (Omulangira) Nyiningabo. He was killed by being burned alive at Benga, for rebellion against his father.
6. Prince (Omulangira) Kafunende. He was killed by being burned alive at Benga, for rebellion against his father.
7. Prince (Omulangira) Kiyimba, whose mother was Seb'andabawa
8. Prince (Omulangira) Kakirebwe, whose mother was Sirisa
9. Prince (Omulangira) Kakungulu, whose mother was Sikyayinza. Prince Kakungulu became the father of twins, born before 1814
10. Prince (Omulangira) Mutebi I, whose mother was Gwowoleza. He was killed by drowning in Busoga for rebellion against his father
11. Prince (Omulangira) Mutebi II, whose mother was Jajjaw'abaana). He contested the succession of his brother in 1814, but was defeated and fled to Bukoba, in Kyaggwe.
12. Prince (Omulangira) Zzimbe, whose mother was Namatama
13. Princess (Omumbejja) Nakuyita, whose mother was Balambi
14. Princess (Omumbejja) Nabisalo, whose mother was Guluma
15. Princess (Omumbejja) Nagaddya, whose mother was Nabisunsa
16. Princess (Omumbejja) Nabinaka

He increased the growth of Mituba (Ficus natalensis) trees and production of Barkcloth in Buganda.

== The final years ==
Kabaka Semakookiro died from an affliction, in old age at the Jjunju Palace at Kasangati, in Kyaddondo County. He was initially buried at Kasangati. In 1869, his remains were exhumed and re-buried at Kisimbiri in Busiro County.

== Quotes ==
"But he understood his own gross and cruel age. He also understood men. They were treacherous. The precautionary measures he had taken to preserve his throne enabled him to be the first king in more than a century to die a natural death. If nineteenth-century kings of Buganda wielded enormous despotic powers as indeed they did, part of the credit must be given to Semakokiro."

- MM Semakula Kiwanuka, A History of Buganda, 1971

== See also ==
- Kabaka of Buganda

Preceded by Jjunju Sendegeya	King of Buganda c.1797–c.1814	Succeeded by Kamaanya Kadduwamamala
