= Wamala Tombs =

Protected site in Uganda

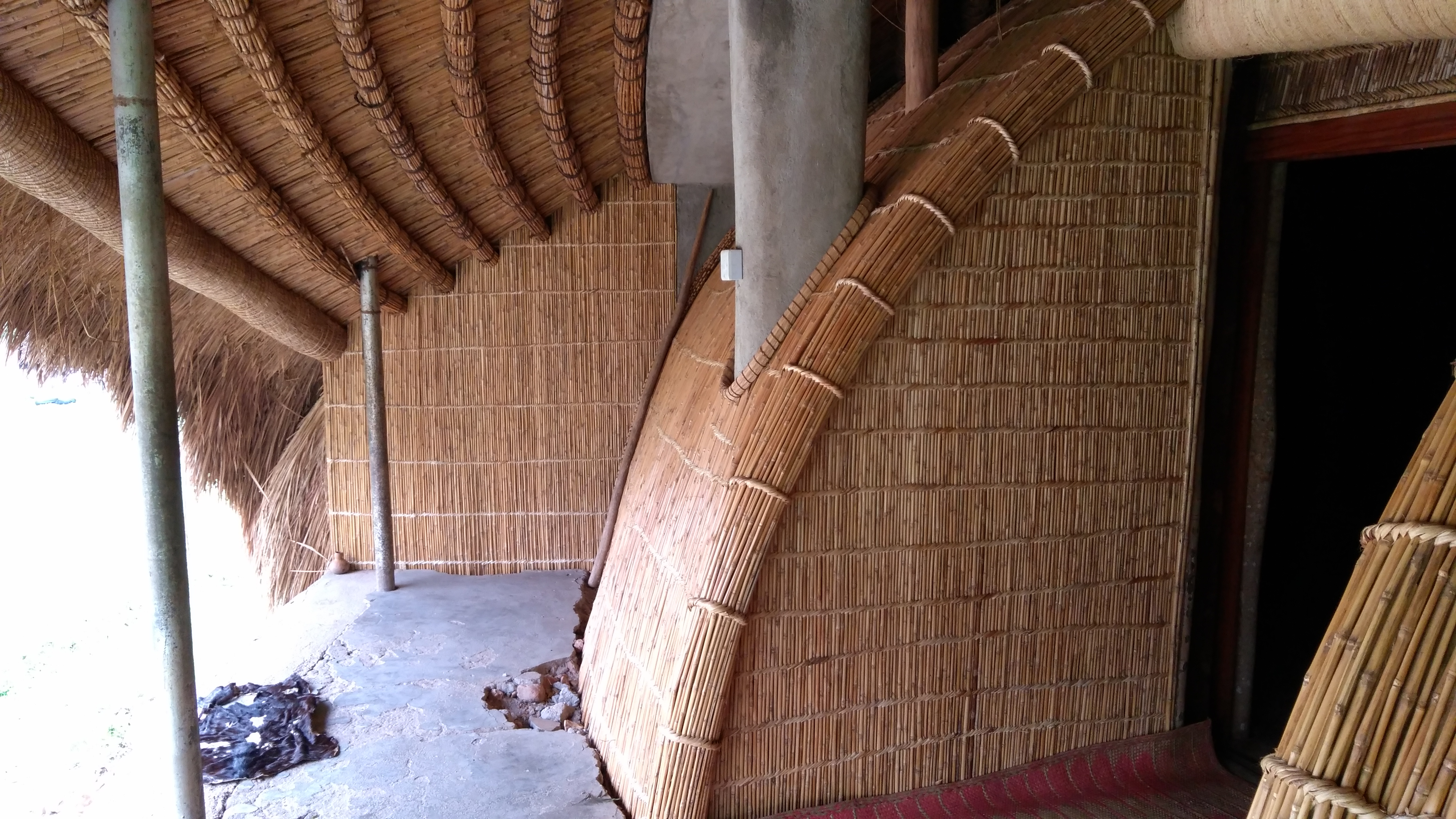
Entrance at Wamala Tombs

Wamala Tombs is a protected cultural heritage site in Uganda. It is found in Nabweru Sub-county, Wakiso district, a suburb of Kampala City. The tombs are the burial site of Ssekabaka Ssuuna II, the 29th king of Buganda who ruled from 1832-1856. The Tombs are a heritage site recognized by UNESCO alongside other heritage sites in Uganda.

== See also ==
- Kasubi Tombs
- Bigo Bya Mugenyi
- Uganda Museum
