= Nvubu Clan =

Clan of Buganda kingdom

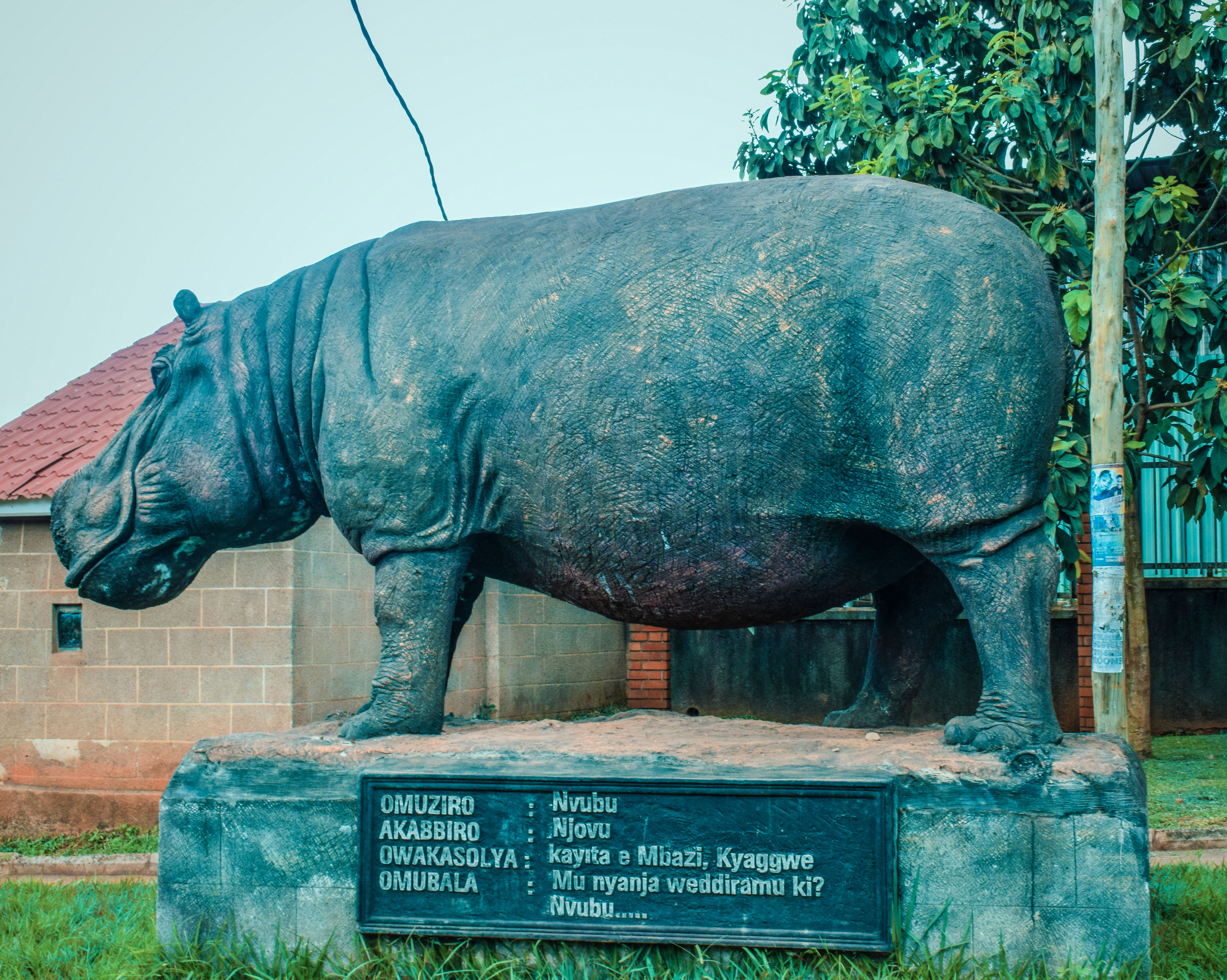
The sculpture symbolises the Nvubu clan totem located in Mengo, Kampala

Nvubu Clan is among the many clans in the present day Buganda Kingdom. It is one of the clans that came to Buganda with Kintu. Nvubu is a Luganda name meaning Hippopotamus. The Nvubu clan head is Kayita.

== Origin ==
During the reign of King Kintu, there was a local doctor who used to gather medicinal herbs during the night. This local doctor's name was called Kayita.

Whenever the King called for Kayita, he would always appear at the palace before day break. This forced the King to ask him, "Gwe oli kayita kiro?" which means "Are you a night traveller?" Hence the name of Kayita.

One of Kayita's sons, Nkukunala, was a prominent resident of Busunju County. Nkukunala's son called Ssemuwooya asked his father what their clan was. The father replied saying, "....a big animal that lives in the lake but feeds on land." That was also where the Ndiira name was derived meaning 'to feed or to eat.' The clan's motto (Omubala) was also derived from the connotation, "Mu nnyanja weddiramu ki? Nvubu, Nvubu, Nvubu."

== Main role in the Buganda Kingdom ==
The Nvubu Clan has two main tasks that were designated to them at the Kabaka's palace.

- Healing the sick/wounded. According to Buganda history, it is said whenever the Kabaka's warriors got wounded, for example if the warrior was struck in the chest by a spear, the doctor "Kayita" would relocate the wound from the chest to the leg and start the treatment process from there.
- Lighting up the palace torches (reeds light) mostly during the King's dinner time or during a conference with his chiefs.

== Nvubu clan heads ==
These are the main clan heads under Kayita:

- Kavubu of Ntonnyeze, Busujju
- Sserumaga of Bwendero, Ssese
- Nkambo of Busaabala, Kyaddondo
- Kasimaggwa of Mbazi, Kyaggwe
- Kisongole of Mbazi, Kyaggwe
- Ggambira of Masujju, Kyaggwe
- Namugunde of Mbazi, Kyaggwe
- Sebabi of Mbazi, Kyaggwe
- Mbuge of Mbazi, Kyaggwe
- Sempuuwo of Zzinga, Busiro
- Jjita of Matanga, Busiro
- Kibowa of Ddamba, Kyaggwe
- Mutwe of Bugolo, Kyaggwe
- Mawagajjo of Bugolo, Kyaggwe
- Ndobera of Buuje (Koome), Kyaggwe
- Walyato of Kkerenge, Buvuma
- Kikondo of Bugolo, Kyaggwe
- Sserufusa of Buligo, Ssese
- Kanaaba of Mbazi, Kyaggwe

== Clan information ==
Clan	Information
Clan (Ekika)	Nvubu
Totem (Akabiro)	Njovu
Clan Head (Omutaka)	Kayita
Clan Seat (Obutaka)	Mbazi, Kyaggwe
Slogan (Omubala)	Mu nnyanja weddiramu ki? Obudde bunzibiridde, Sula. Gabalama, gabalama, gabalama, gabalama ennyanja.

== See also ==
- Mpologoma clan
- Lugave clan
- Mpindi clan
