= Mpologoma Clan =

Clan of Buganda kingdom

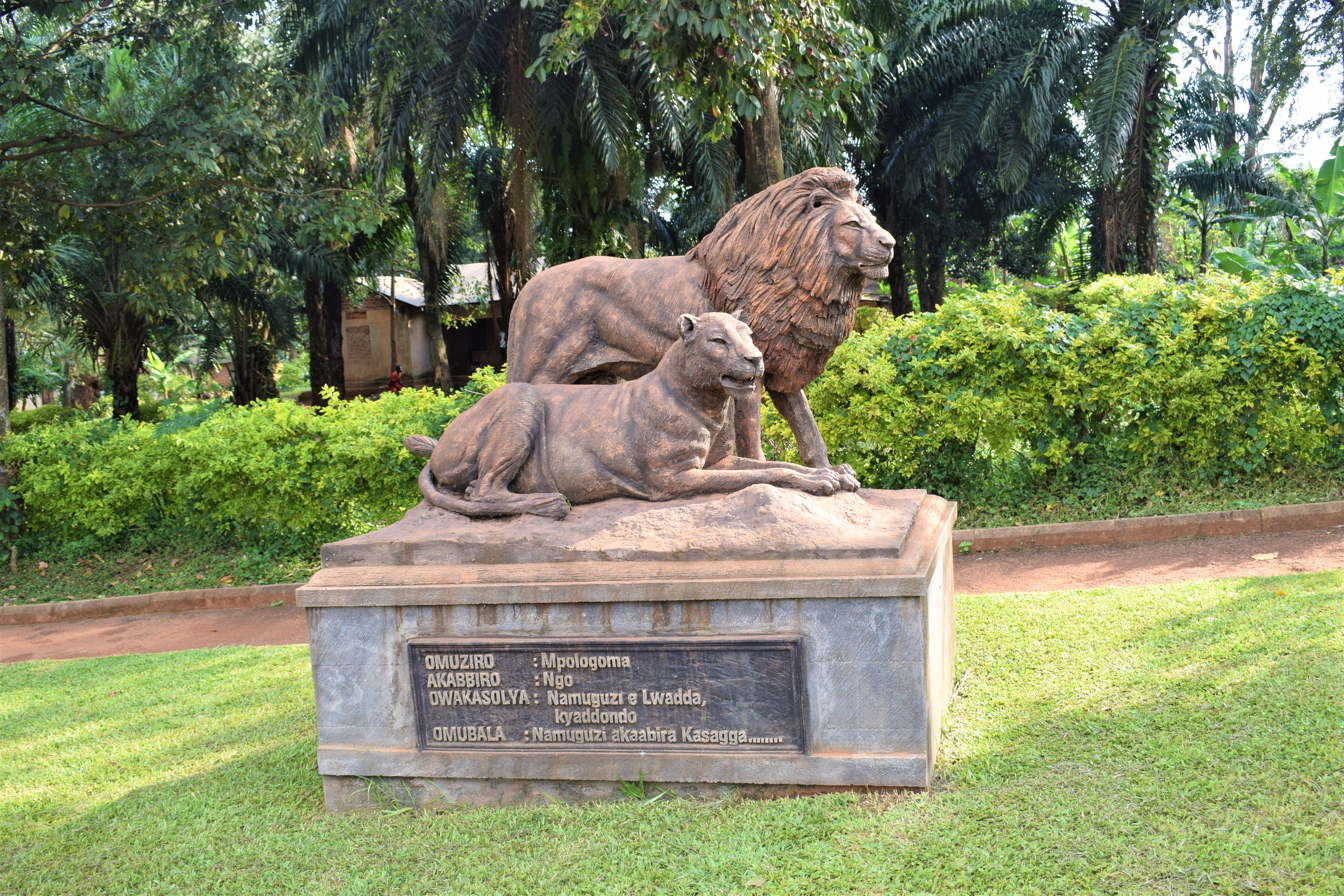
The sculpture symbolises the Mpologoma (Lion) Clan Totem located in Mengo Kampala

Mpologoma clan is among the clans in present-day Buganda Kingdom that are believed to have come with kabaka Kintu Kintu. Mpologoma is a word in Luganda which means lion. Every Muganda belongs to a clan, which automatically has to be his fathers's clan, and each clan has a totem a totem and minor totems which they are not allowed to eat and these totems are guarded jealously. The King of Buganda is also known as "Empologoma ya Buganda" which means the "Lion of Buganda".

== Origin of the mpologoma clan ==
On Lwadda hill at Matugga, Kyadondo county in Wakiso district, is where Kabaka Kintu built his main palace and he set up the palace after discovering that this hill was so nice when he was hunting coming from his Kanyaya palace . The clan started when Kabaka Kintu was in his Lwadda palace and lions roared from Kasalirwe hill, near Lwadda hill in Matugga, in Buganda's Kyadondo county in present day Wakiso district in Uganda. People were living in fear because of these fierce wild animals and Kabaka Kintu himself was not happy with it .When kabaka thought of how he can address this problem, he sent for his son Ssebuganda who was an expert in identifying the foot prints of wild animals to go and trace them so that they can be hunted and killed. It is said that while going to Lwadda to meet his father, Kabaka kintu, he passed by his father's palace of Kanyanya to pick his expectant mother then, Nambi Nantuttululu and they went together to Lwadda palace. It is said that Kabaka Kintu went with him to hunt the lion. When they reached Nasse village on kasalirwe hill where the hunting took place, they started chasing these animals, the first to run towards them lifting its mane and wanting to attack them was the male lion and Ssebuganda hit it with his stick rod and it died immediately. After killing the male, the lioness also ran to attack them and Ssebuganda using the same stick killed it also.

Kabaka Kintu left his son slaughtering the lions in the bush and went back to his palace. On reaching the palace, he found his wife had given birth to twins.

Kabaka kintu sent his brother in-law called Kawuuzuumo whom he had also made a royal guard (Omumbowa) in the palace to go to the bush where the lions were being slaughtered and tell his son Ssebuganda that his mother had produced twins, and he should bring for him some meat from the lions he had killed and slaughtered and also the stick he used to kill the lions too. After slaughtering the lions, Ssebuganda as requested by his father took the meat and also the stick he used to kill the lions. He found Kabaka Kintu in a meeting and gave him the stick that he used to hit the lions and on seeing the stick, Kabaka Kintu held it in his hand, looked at it and put it down. He picked again, held it in his hand and put it back .He did so several times and lastly said Wamma guno ssi muggo buggo luwaga meaning this is not just a mere stick but luwaga.

The lions' meat he brought for his father was cooked and some roasted for the people who were in the meeting to eat. Ssebuganda took some meat also to his home and some of the meat was prepared for dinner that night and some roasted .When dinner was ready ready, they sat down and blessed " Jajja Ddungu " the god of game of hunting in Buganda and they ate. After eating the lion's meat, all people in kabaka Kintu's palace and at Ssebuganda's home who ate on the lion's meat that developed complications, which included running stomachs, stomachache and vomited a lot also.

The following day, Kabaka Kintu sent his royal guard (Omumbowa ) Kawuuzumo to go and inform his son Ssebuganda about the stomach complications, and problems they had experienced after eating the lions' meat and also to inform him that the stick he used to kill the lions together with the chair he found him sitting on in a meeting when he brought the stick had turned into stones .In the same way, Ssebuganda early that morning sent a messenger to tell his father Kabaka Kintu about what had happened to him and his people in the night after eating on the lions meat but these two messengers used different routes. When Kawuuzuumo the guard (Omumbowa), reached Ssebuganda's home and learnt that even Ssebuganda's family had experienced the same problems after eating on the lions meat as those people in Kabaka Kintu's palace, he (Kawuzuumo ) didn't ask any one but just collected all the meat that had remained at the Ssebuganda's home and all the meat he found at the fire place on sticks being roasted and went with it back to the palace. He also collected even all the meat that had remained in the palace without leaving any piece behind, took it all together and dumped it Nakiduduma spring well.

On seeing what had happened to him and his people who ate on the lions' meat and when he also heard what happened to people at his son's home who ate on the lions meat, he declared himself, his children and all his grandchildren never again to eat on the meat from lions hence the emerging of the Mpologoma Clan. It was also believed that if they eat the lion's meat again, they would develop worse complications compared to what they experienced.

People from mpologoma clan are sometimes called royals (ie princes and princesses) because their clan came from the eldest son of Kabaka Kintu and a Kabaka produces princes and princesses

== The immediate successive subdivisions / lineages below the clan head ( Ssebuganda Namuguzi ) that form the mpologoma clan ( Amasiga agakola ekika ky'empologoma ) ==
Like all clans in Buganda, even the mpologoma clan after Ssebuganda Namuguzi the clan head at the top, going down in the clan structure has 29 immediate subdivisions ( called amasiga) and according to Buganda culture and norms ( ennono) the heads of these immediate subdivisions after the clan head were the children of the very first head of that clan. In most of Buganda clans, leadership in these subdivisions is hereditary. These are the twenty nine mpologoma clan immediate subdivision below, after the clan head Namuguzi Ssebuganda

1. Tebwakedde lineage
2. Nnyalwa lineage at Bbanda in Buddu county (In greater Masaka district)
3. Kiyuuka at Birongo in Buddu county (In greater Masaka district)
4. Kimaka at Bumaka in Kyaggwe county (In Mukono district )
5. Masengere.
6. Lumeeme
7. Mubbi Walutta at Bugiri Kojja in Kyaggwe county (In Mukono district )
8. Katajjwa at Mitondo in Buddu county ( In greater Masaka district)
9. Wassaggo at Lwadda in Kyaddondo county ( In Wakiso district )
10. Ssembiro Kibaddo at Kkulambiro Kyaddono ( Wakiso district )
11. Kirubaale at Ziroobwe Bulemeezi county ( Luweero district )
12. Luguma
13. Kabengwa at Bubengwa in Bulemeezi county ( Luweero district )
14. Kawemula at Buwemula in Ggomba county ( Ggomba district )
15. Kannajje at Kijujjusa in Buddu county (Greater Masaka district)
16. Ssegamwenge at Lwadda Kyaddondo county ( Wakiso district )
17. Kasendwa at Kajuna in Buddu county (Greater Masaka district)
18. Lubanjwa at Lusiriba Mawokota county (Mpigi district)
19. Makaayi at Namboole in Kyaddondo county ( Wakiso district )
20. Mpuuta Kakadde at Mpuku in Kyaggwe county ( greater Mukono district )
21. Golooba
22. Lule at Mpaffe in Mawokota county ( Mpigi district)
23. Ssagala at Butenzi in Buddu county (Greater Masaka district)
24. Kyalongo
25. Kkukumba at Kibindu in Buddu county ( Greater Masaka district )
26. Ggonjaagabwe
27. Lubyayi lineage at Kasaka in Buddu county ( Greater Masaka district)
28. Mululu lineage at Kasumba Kasalirwe Kyaddondo county ( Wakiso district )
29. Kiroomu lineage at Katalemwa in Kyaddondo county ( Wakiso district )

== Clan names ==
Some of the Mpologoma clan names include the following :

=== Names given to boys in the clan ===
- Ggenza
- Jjuuko
- Kajumba
- Kalema
- Kasagga
- Kasalirwe
- Kayemba
- Kayondo
- Kibuule
- Kimbugwe
- Kiyimba
- Kisekka
- Kitowoolo
- Lubuulwa
- Luwaga
- Luwemba
- Makaayi
- Mululu
- Ntale
- Ssebandeke
- Ssebuwufu
- Ssegamwenge
- Ssembwa
- Sserwadda
- Ssekibuule
- Wassajja

=== Names given to girls in the clan ===
- Nantale
- Nabadda
- Nabisere
- Nabuwufu
- Naggenza
- Najjuuko
- Nakalema
- Nakasagga
- Nakayondo
- Nakibuule
- Nakimbugwe
- Nakisozi
- Nakitowoolo
- Nakisekka
- Nakiyimba
- Nalubuulwa
- Nalubyayi
- Naluwaga
- Naluwemba
- Nalwadda
- Namazzi
- Nassiwa
- Nassolo
- Nassuuna.

== Mpologoma Clan information ==
Clan	Information
Totem ( Omuziro )	Mpologoma
Secondary totem ( Akabbiro)	Ngo
Clan head ( Omukulu w'ekika ow'akasolya)	Ssebuganda Namuguzi
Clan seat ( Obutaka bw'ekika )	Lwadda, Kyaddondo
Clan Envoy (Omubaka w'Omutaka mu) UK & Ireland	Margaret D Ntale
	Ssebuganda Namuguzi Omutaka we Lwadda kyagaba tasaba tasaaga. Ssebuganda Namuguzi Omutaka we Lwadda bwaba anatabaala asaabira ku kyoto. Ssebuganda Namuguzi Omutaka we Lwadda akaabira Kasagga. Ssebuganda Namuguzi Omutaka we Lwadda atambula masajja. Ggwe mpagi gwe Luwaga.

== Some of the mpologoma clan names and words and their origin ==
1. Namuguzi :The name Namuguzi started with Ssegamwenge, Ssebuganda's son who escorted prince Kalemeera to Bunyoro to work . Ssegamwemnge bought many hand hoes from Bunyoro, which he brought and sold to Baganda, hence naming him Namuguzi deriving the name from the word "okugula" which means "to buy" to mean someone who buys hand hoes and sells them to Buganda
2. Kasagga: This name was adopted by the mpologoma clan from a munyoro man called Misagga, who was chased away, by Ssekabaka Jjuuko and Namuguzi Ggenza Zziiziiri from Bulemeezi county. When Ssekabaka Jjuuko gave that place to Namuguzi, it was renamed Kasagga to remember Misagga who used to reside in that place in Bulemeezi.
3. Luwaga: This name was given to the stick rod that Ssebuganda used to kill the two lions when they went to hunt them as Kabaka Kintu wondered and said "guno ssi muggo luwaga (" this is not a mere stick but luwaga") and from there, luwaga started being used as a name in the mpologoma clan.
4. Kawemula: This name started with Ssekabaka Kateregga who sent Namuguzi's son to go to Ggomba to fight Banyoro, however he lost the battle and when Kabaka Kateregga got the news about his defeat, he said in his words wondering also that ng'omugabe awemudde Obuganda " !, meaning (As the fighter has ashamed Buganda" ) hence permanently becoming a clan name
5. Kireega: Came as a result of Kabaka Kintu directing his son Ssebuganda to make two small drums . Ssebuganda on geting this directive, he also directed his son Mululu Kasumba to make the drums. Because the making of drums is called okuleega in luganda, that's how that name Kireega came about. Up to date Kireega is the katikkiro of the clan and is responsible for leading the making of the kingdom royal drums called Mujaguzo .This position is also hereditary.............

== Oluyimba lw'ekika ky'empologoma (Mpologoma clan Anthem) ==
Empologoma ye ffe, ffe mpologoma

Ensolo zonna zitya empologoma

Ffe baazzukulu ba Ssebuganda Namuguzi

e Lwadda mu Kyaddondo gyali.

Omutanda atumanyi ffe ab'empologoma.

era kitwesimisa bwobeera gwe?

Wullira omubala ogwaffe gwogera

"Ssebuganda Namuguzi kyagaba, tasaaga

omutaka Ssebuganda Namuguzi atambula masajja

bwaba anaatabaala asaabira ku kyoto....

Ssebuganda Namuguzi omutaka w'e Lwadda

akaabira Kasagga.Gwe mpagi gwe luwaga....gwe mpagi gwe luwaga""

Empologoma akabbiro y'engo

n'amasiga agaffe gali abiri mu munaana

Omutaka Kireega ye katikkiro,

w'empologoma n'obwa Kireega

bwa nsikirano.

Ssegamwenge y'oyo ow'essiga

jajja Namuguzi mwava

alamula empologoma

Wullira omubala ogwaffe gwogera

"Ssebuganda Namuguzi kyagaba, tasaaga

omutaka Ssebuganda Namuguzi atambula masajja

bwaba anaatabaala asaabira ku kyoto....

Ssebuganda Namuguzi omutaka w'e Lwadda

akaabira Kasagga....

Gwe mpagi gwe luwaga....

gwe mpagi gwe luwaga""

Katajjwa, oyo wa ssiga, yaakomaga

olubugo olusumikirwa omutanda..

Lubyayi, mu Buddu eri e Kasaka

yakomaga olwa Nnaalinya lubuga

Ab'empologoma kukola na kunnyweza

butaka, e Lwadda jajja Namuguzi

gyali alinze.....

Okuleega mujaguzo ogwo gwaffe

era bwe bumu ku buweereza bwaffe

eri Kabaka....

Twenyumiriza okuleega

engoma zino mujaguzo

tetuva ku lusegere lw'omutanda...

Kale nno mujaguzo bwezivuga

omutima ogwaffe gubuuka ffe ng'abempologoma....

Wullira omubala ogwaffe gwogera

"Ssebuganda Namuguzi kyagaba, tasaaga

omutaka Ssebuganda Namuguzi atambula masajja

bwaba anaatabaala asaabira ku kyoto....

Ssebuganda Namuguzi omutaka w'e Lwadda

akabira Kasagga....

Gwe mpagi gwe luwaga....

gwe mpagi gwe luwaga""

Empologoma kika kya kitiibwa

jajja Namuguzi amuzaala

ye Kabaka Kintu....

Ffe ab'empologoma

tuli bambejja n'abalangira abasibuka

mu kabaka Kintu.

Kino ekika kyaffe bakyegomba kuba

kya ttutumu, kwogatta ebyafaayo

lutotto

Empologoma nga ya kitiibwa.. !

emanyi okweyiggira erina amanyi....

Bwendayira nnyinimu

kitegeeza mweri empologoma,

twesiimye abeddira empologoma

Katonda jajjaffe amukuume

jajja Namuguzi, Obuganda

ne Mutaddwamu...

Wullira omubala ogwaffe gwogera

"Ssebuganda Namuguzi kyagaba, tasaaga

omutaka Ssebuganda Namuguzi atambula masajja

bwaba anaatabaala asaabira ku kyoto....

Ssebuganda Namuguzi omutaka w'e Lwadda

akaabira Kasagga....

Gwe mpagi gwe luwaga....

gwe mpagi gwe luwaga""

== Mpologoma Clan roles in Buganda Kingdom ==
- Mpologoma clan people are the ones, responsible for making all kingdom's royal drums ( called Mujaguzo in luganda language) and this duty is led by a chief ( Omutaka ) in the mpologoma clan called Kasumba kireega of Kasalirwe hill village who is also the katikikiro of the clan head and this position is hereditary.
- Ssebuganda Namuguzi, the mpologoma clan head is the one who does the first ground breaking wherever every reigning Buganda king (Kabaka) wishes to build his palace
- People from mpologoma clan are the ones who make bark cloths for Kabaka and princesses

== Historical things and tourist attractions that can be found at Lwadda the mpologoma clan first and main Ancestral clan headquarter/ seat (Obutaka) ==
1. A chair inform a stone where Ssebuganda the clan head is crowned after being chosen asthe clan head since this position is hereditary
2. A fire place ( Ekyoto) that combines all Buganda clans and ti is said that this used to be lit by Kabaka Kintu to join all clans
3. A stone called Luwaga that is said to have been a stick that Ssebuganda used to kill the lions when they went to hunt them
4. A stone called Nakisozi and Nakisozi is one of the names given to girls in the mpologpma clan
5. A water well (Oluzzi) called Nakibuule and Nakibuule is also one of the names given to girls in the mpologpma clan
6. Kabaka Kintu's house

== Kasagga, another clan seat of the Mpologoma clan ==
The mpologoma clan also has another seat at Kassaga in Bulemeezi county as the word Kasagga is heard in the clan slogan or drum beat that "Namuguzi akaabira Kasagga"

== See also ==
- Mpindi Clan
- Lugave clan
- Ngonge Clan
