= Lugave Clan =

Clan of Buganda kingdom

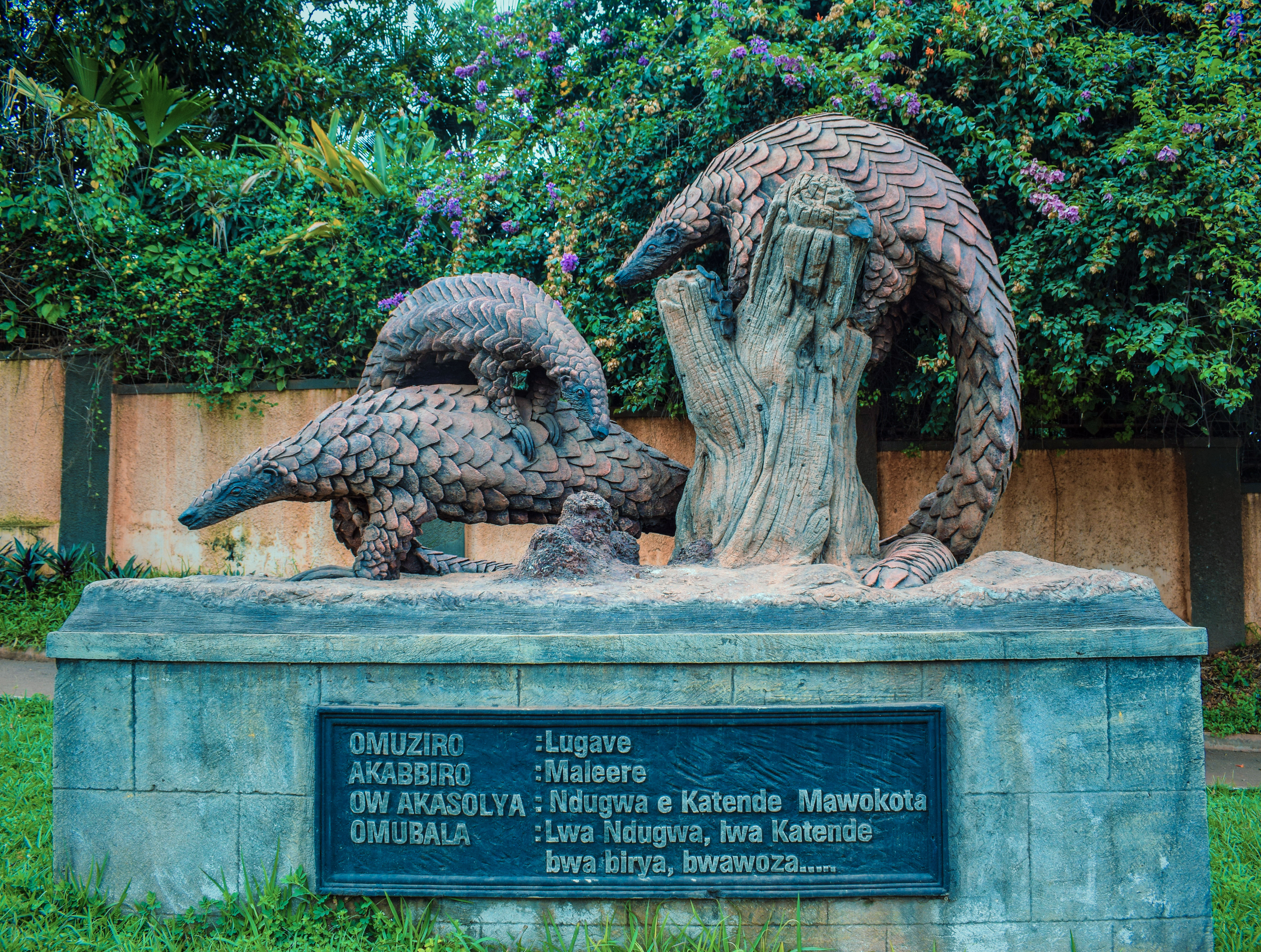
Sculpture of the Lugave Clan located in Mengo, Kampala

== Clan information ==
Clan	Information
Clan (Ekika)	Lugave
Totem (Omuziro)	Maleere
Clan Head(Omutaka)	Ndugwa
Clan Seat (Obutaka)	Katende, Mawokota
Clan Envoy (Omubaka w'Omutaka mu) UK & Ireland	Vincent B Mukiibi Lwa Ndugwa, lwa Katende
Slogan (Omubala)	Bwabirya, bw'awoza. Sseruku lulengejja, simanyi lunangwira. Bw'ompa akawala ako, ng'ebbanja liwedde.

== See also ==
- Buganda Kingdom
- Mpindi Clan
- Mpologoma Clan
- Lugave Clan
