= Mpindi clan =

Clan of Buganda kingdom

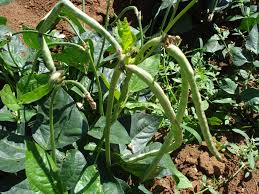
Mpindi plant

Mpindi is one of the 56 clans of the Buganda Kingdom, a historic cultural institution in Uganda. one of the largest ethnic tribes of Uganda. The Mpindi clan head (omutaka) is called Mazige and the clan seat (obutaka) is at Muyenje, Busiro County in Uganda. The Mpindi clan has the mpindi, a Luganda word for cowpea (Vigna unguiculalta) or Kiyindiru in Luganda, as its totem.Members of the clan often refrain from eating or disrespecting their totem as part of traditional taboo practice.Clan identity is inherited patrilineally and plays an important role in cultural and social organization within Buganda society.

== Origin (Obutaka) ==
According to legend, Mbogga, the founder of the clan, came with Ssekabaka (King) Kintu to establish the kingdom of Buganda along the north western shores of Lake Nalubaale (Victoria) during the 15th century. Traditionally, Mbogga's job in the palace was to look after the king's cow, "Mbulidde", a role that is now performed by the clan in the kingdom.

The Mpindi Clan currently is divided into two units; one belongs to Mbogga with its headquarters on Nsumba Hill in Mawokota (current Mpigi District) and the other belongs to Mugalu in Kyaggwe (current Mukono District).

== Mpindi Clan drum-Beat (Omubala Gw'ekika ky'e Mpindi ) ==
Samba eggotto. Samba egotto. Ggwe Mazige, Muggalu ne Kawenyera x 3

== Anthem (Oluyimba lw'ekika ) ==
Oluyimba lw’ekika olutongole (Mpindi Official Anthem)

Ekiddibwamu (Chorus) Ka tuyimbe ffenna n’essanyu lingi Olwe’ekika kyaffe ekyokubwabajjajjaffe Tuwere mu maaso ga jjajjaffe Mazige Nti ffe ab’Empindi tunywedde

Mu bika ebiri mu luse olwokubiri Ekika eky’empind mwanattu kivuga Tuwera obutaswaza jjajjaffe Mazige Kaakano ab’eMpindi tuwera Ekiddibwamu (Chorus)

Tukola emirimu ewa bbaffe Ffe tukuuma Mbulidde eyo nte yembuga Tuli bawulize bbaffe bwaba atutumye Wetuli tetujja kweganya Ekiddibwamu (Chorus)

Tukole ekika kigaggawale Ka tuzaale empindi eyole Tukuume ebyabangwawo bajjajjaffe Naffe tusseewo ebipya

Emirembe n’emirembe tetujja kwetya Tuwera okukuuma Mazige Buganda yattu ebya Buganda byonna Awangaale ayi nnyinimu wangaala

== Naming of children (Okutuuma amanya) ==
There being three lineages within the clan, each has a distinct set of names for both male and female.

== Boys clan names (Amanya agatuumibwa abaana abalenzi) ==
Bwabye, Kabanda, Kadoma, Kamyuuka, Kasenge, Katantazi, Kawenyera, Kikambi, Kitenda, Kyaluula, Kyembe, Kyeswa, Lukowe, Lutimba, Lyazi, Majeegwa, Matutu, Mbere, Mbogga, Mbogo, Mboowa, Mugalu, Mugenyi, Mukuuma, Muluuta, Muwoone, Muwube, Muyimbwa, Muyobyo, Nalikka, Nnankyama, Nsumba, Ntabaazi, Ntulume, Sebadduka, Ssalambwa, Ssekaluvu, Ssendegeya, Ssensawo, Sserubende, Ssewambwa, Wakibugu.

== Girls clan names (Amanya agatuumibwa abaana abawala) ==
Bulyaba, Najjuko, Nakabanda, Nakafu, Nalube, Nalule, Namboowa, Namuganyi, Namugenyi, Namuswe, Namuyimbwa, Nannozi, Nansumba, Nawambwa.

== Role and cultural significance ==
Clans in Buganda are fundamental units of social structure.Each clan has its own totem, ancestral traditions, naming systems(amanya), taboos and cultural roles.Clan membership influences marriage norms, inheritance, burial rituals, and other aspects of life.Members are expected to uphold clan values and participate in ceremonies that affirms collective identity.

== See also ==
- Njaza Clan
- Lugave Clan

== Mpindi clan ==
- Official Buganda Kingdom Website
- Buganda.com
- 101africa.com
