= Insects in mythology =

Interpretations and traditional meanings of insects among various human cultures

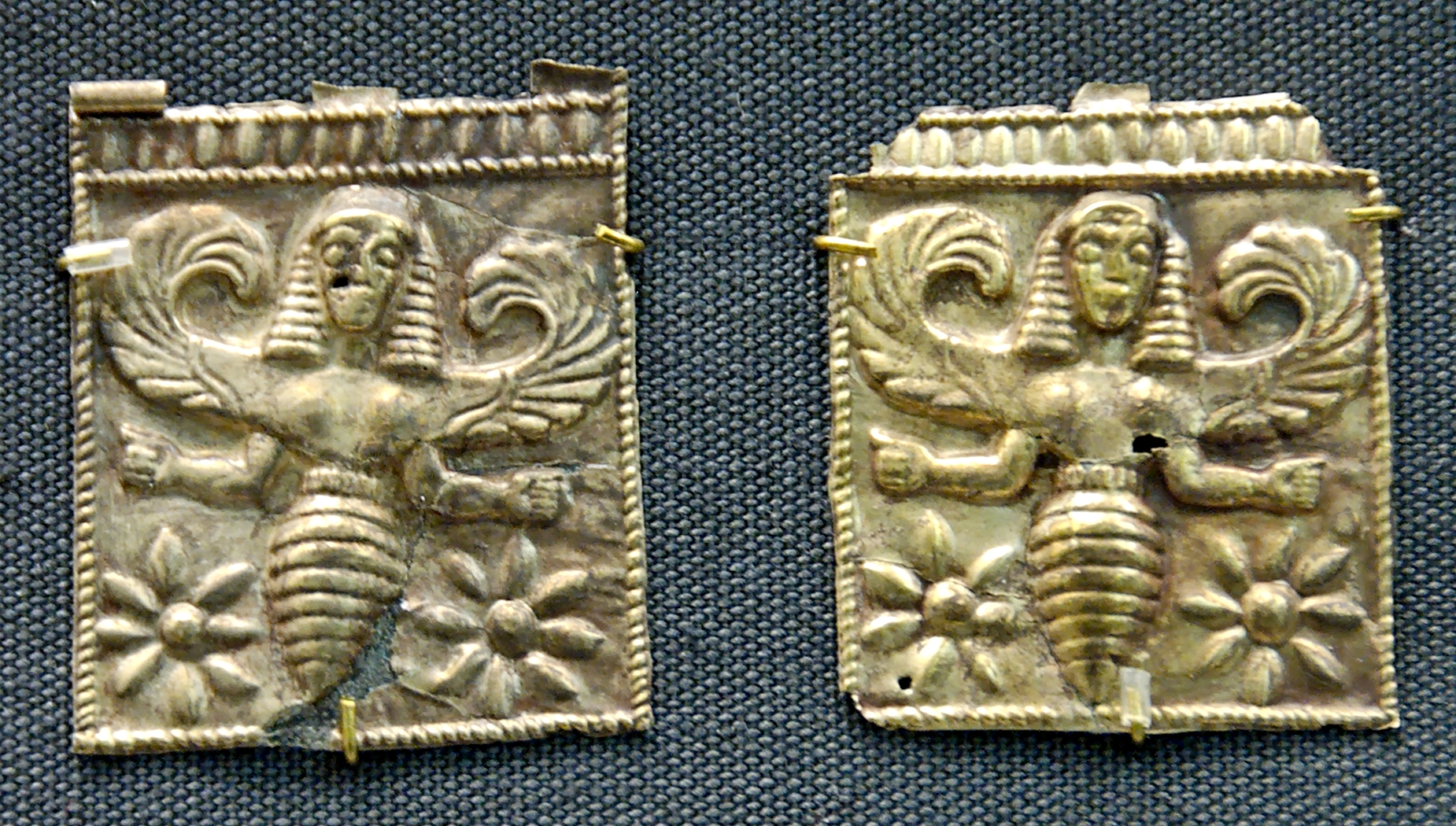
Gold plaques embossed with winged bee goddesses, perhaps the Thriai, found at Camiros in Rhodes, 7th century B.C.

Insects have appeared in mythology around the world from ancient times. Among the insect groups featuring in myths are the bee, fly, butterfly, cicada, dragonfly, praying mantis and scarab beetle.

Insect myths may present the origins of a people, or of their skills such as finding honey. Other myths concern the nature of the gods or their actions, and how they may be appeased. A variety of myths tell of transformations, such as between the soul of a living or dead person and a butterfly in Japan. Finally, insects appear as symbols of human qualities such as swiftness, or as portents of forthcoming trouble; accordingly, they may appear as amulets to ward off evil.

== Myths of origin ==
The Kalahari Desert's San people tell of a bee that carried a mantis across a river. The exhausted bee left the mantis on a floating flower but planted a seed in the mantis's body before it died. The seed grew to become the first human.

In Egyptian mythology, bees grew from the tears of the sun god Ra when they landed on the desert sand. There Egyptian gods that associate with insects like Selket Khepri and Neith The bowstring on Hindu love god Kamadeva's bow is made of honeybees.

The Baganda people of Uganda hold the legend of Kintu, the first man on earth. Save for his cow, Kintu lived alone. One day he asked permission from Ggulu, who lived in heaven, to marry his daughter Nambi. Ggulu set Kintu on a trial of five tests to pass before he would agree. For his final test Kintu was told to pick Ggulu's own cow from a stretch of cattle. Nambi aided Kintu in the final test by transforming herself into a bee, whispering into his ear to choose the one whose horn she landed on.

In Greek Mythology, Aristaeus was the god of bee-keeping. After inadvertently causing the death of Eurydice, who stepped upon a snake while fleeing him, her nymph sisters punished him by killing every one of his bees. Witnessing the empty hives where his bees had dwelt, Aristaeus wept and consulted Proteus who then proceeded to advise Aristaeus to give honor in memory of Eurydice by sacrificing four bulls and four cows. Upon doing so, he let them rot and from their corpses rose bees to fill his empty hives.

In the Homeric Hymn to Aphrodite, the goddess Aphrodite retells the legend of how Eos, the goddess of the dawn, requested Zeus to let her lover Tithonus live forever as an immortal. Zeus granted her request, but, because Eos forgot to ask him to also make Tithonus ageless, Tithonus never died, but he did grow old. Eventually, he became so tiny and shriveled that he turned into the first cicada.

Among Aboriginal Australians, a tale tells how giant men found bee honeycomb, and taught the Aboriginal peoples how to find it.

== Gods and mortals ==
In an ancient Sumerian poem, a fly helps the goddess Inanna when her husband Dumuzid is being chased by galla demons. Flies also appear on Old Babylonian seals as symbols of Nergal, the god of death and fly-shaped lapis lazuli beads were often worn by many different cultures in ancient Mesopotamia, along with other kinds of fly-jewellery. The Akkadian Epic of Gilgamesh contains allusions to dragonflies, signifying the impossibility of immortality.

The Homeric Hymn to Apollo acknowledges that Apollo's gift of prophecy first came to him from three bee maidens, usually but doubtfully identified with the Thriae, a trinity of pre-Hellenic Aegean bee goddesses. A series of identical embossed gold plaques were recovered at Camiros in Rhodes; they date from the archaic period of Greek art in the seventh century, but the winged bee goddesses they depict must be far older.

In Prometheus Bound, attributed to the Athenian tragic playwright Aeschylus, a gadfly sent by Zeus's wife Hera pursues and torments his mistress Io, who has been transformed into a cow and is watched constantly by the hundred eyes of the herdsman Argus. Shakespeare alludes to the myth: "Io: Ah! Hah! Again the prick, the stab of gadfly-sting! O earth, earth, hide, the hollow shape—Argus—that evil thing—the hundred-eyed."

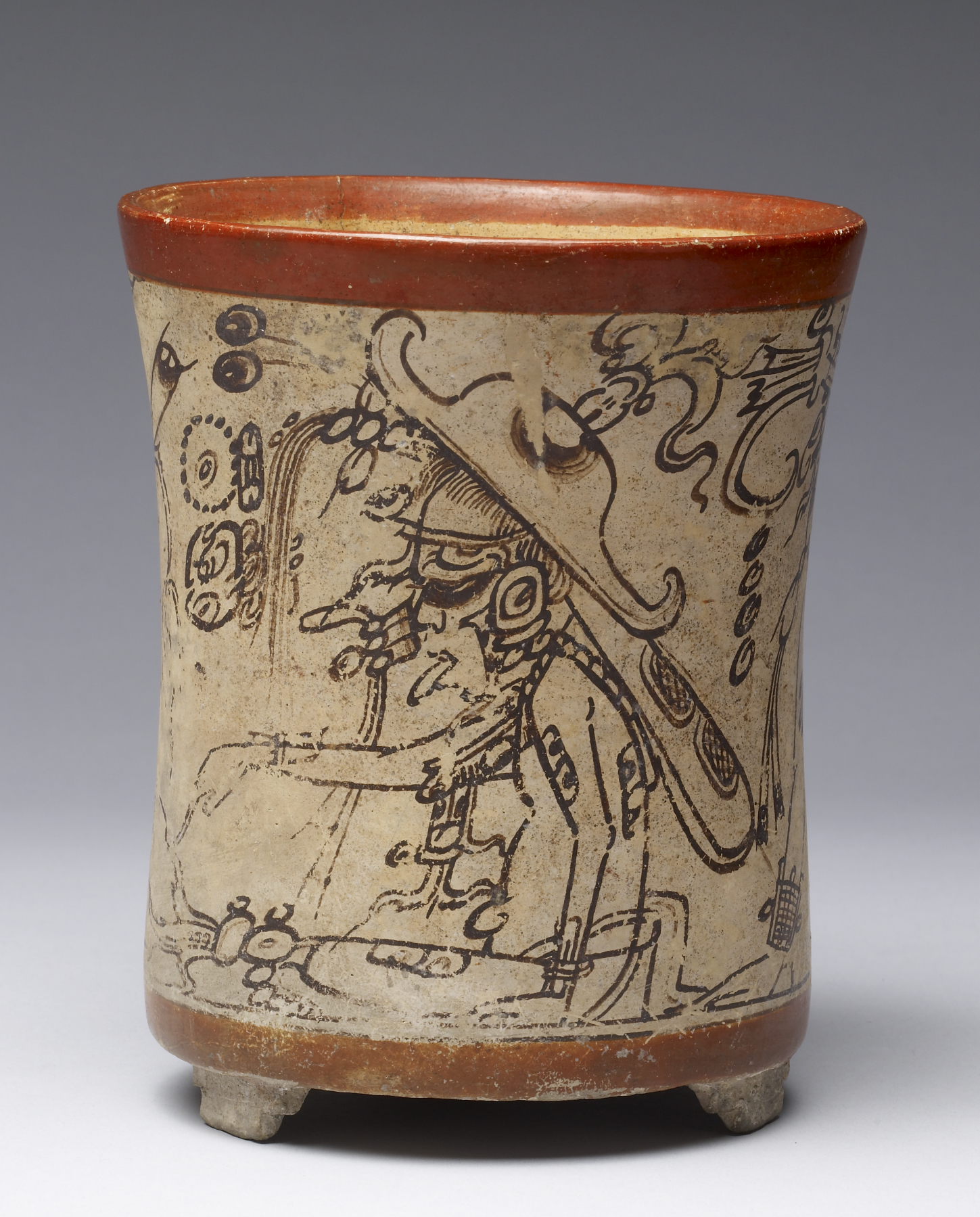
Mok Chi', patron deity of beekeepers, on a codex-style Maya vessel

In Hittite mythology, the god of agriculture, Telipinu, went on a rampage and refused to allow anything to grow and animals would not produce offspring. The gods went in search of Telipinu only to fail. Then the goddess Hannahannah sent forth a bee to bring him back. The bee finds Telipinu, stings him and smears wax upon him. The god grew even angrier, until the goddess Kamrusepa (or a mortal priest according to some references) used a ritual to send his anger to the Underworld.

In Hindu mythology, Parvati was summoned by the Gods to kill the demon Arunasura in the form of Bhramari Devi, who took over the heavens and the three worlds. She stings him to death with the help of innumerable black bees emerging from her body, and the Gods regain control.

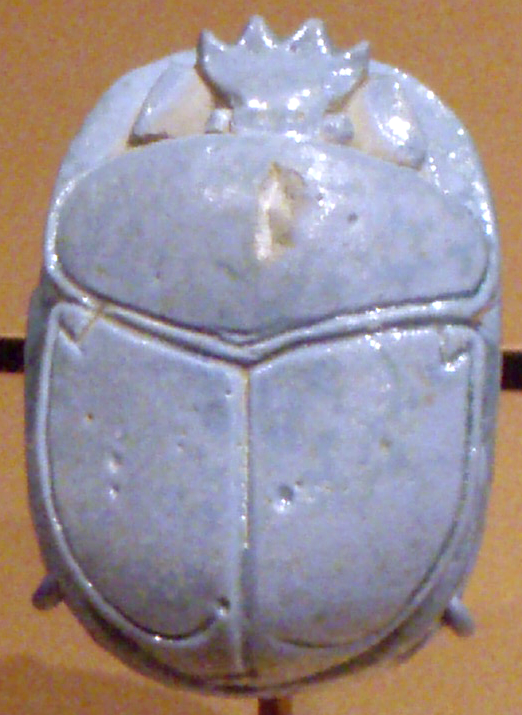
Commemorative Marriage Scarab for Queen Tiye from Amenhotep III

In ancient Egyptian religion, the sun god Ra is seen to roll across the sky each day, transforming bodies and souls. Beetles of the family Scarabaeidae (dung beetle) roll dung into a ball as food and as a brood chamber in which to lay eggs; this way, the larvae hatch and are immediately surrounded by food. For these reasons the scarab was seen as a symbol of this heavenly cycle and of the idea of rebirth or regeneration. The Egyptian god Khepri, Ra as the rising sun, was often depicted as a scarab beetle or as a scarab beetle-headed man. The ancient Egyptians believed that Khepri renewed the sun every day before rolling it above the horizon, then carried it through the other world after sunset, only to renew it, again, the next day.

The mantis was revered in southern African Khoi and San traditions where man and nature were intertwined. Several ancient civilizations considered the insect to have supernatural powers; for the Greeks, it had the ability to show lost travelers the way home; in the Ancient Egyptian Book of the Dead the "bird-fly" is a minor god that leads the souls of the dead to the underworld; in a list of 9th-century BC Nineveh grasshoppers (buru), the mantis is named necromancer (buru-enmeli) and soothsayer (buru-enmeli-ashaga).

== Transformations ==
According to Lafcadio Hearn, a butterfly was seen in Japan as the personification of a person's soul; whether they be living, dying, or already dead. If a butterfly enters your guestroom and perches behind the bamboo screen, it is said in Japan that the person whom you most love is coming to see you. Large numbers of butterflies are viewed as bad omens. When Taira no Masakado was secretly preparing for his famous revolt, there appeared in Kyoto so vast a swarm of butterflies that the people were frightened – thinking the apparition to be a portent of coming evil.

Diderot's Encyclopédie similarly cites butterflies as a symbol for the soul. A Roman sculpture depicts a butterfly exiting the mouth of a dead man, representing the Roman belief that the soul leaves through the mouth. Indeed, the ancient Greek word for "butterfly" is ψυχή (psȳchē), which primarily means "soul" or "mind". According to Mircea Eliade, some of the Nagas of Manipur claim ancestry from a butterfly. In some cultures, butterflies symbolise rebirth. In the English county of Devon, people once hurried to kill the first butterfly of the year, to avoid a year of bad luck. In the Philippines, a lingering black butterfly or moth in the house is taken to mean a death in the family.

An Ancient Greek myth tells of the cithara player Eunomos ("Mr Goodtune"). During a competition, the highest string on his five-string cithara broke. At that moment, a cicada landed on the musical instrument and sang in the place of the missing string: together, they won the competition.

An Australian aboriginal tale tells how a man builds a shelter for his sick son; when he returns with food, his son has vanished, but up in a tree is a cocoon around a pupa.

== Symbols, amulets and omens ==
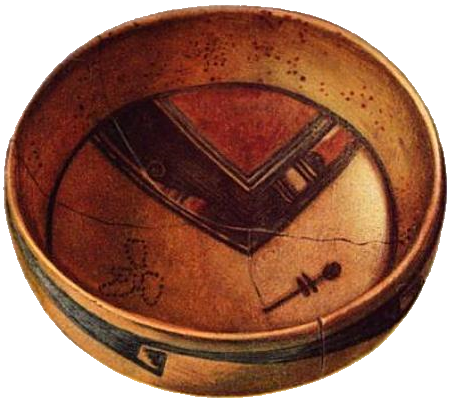
Dragonfly symbol on a Hopi bowl from Sikyátki, Arizona

Insects have often been taken to represent qualities, for good or ill, and accordingly have been used as amulets to ward off evil, or as omens that predict forthcoming events. A blue-glazed faience dragonfly amulet was found by Flinders Petrie at Lahun, from the Late Middle Kingdom of ancient Egypt. During the Greek Archaic Era, the grasshopper was the symbol of the polis of Athens, possibly because they were among the most common insects on the dry plains of Attica. Native Athenians wore golden grasshopper brooches to symbolize that they were of pure, Athenian lineage and did not have any foreign ancestors. In later times, this custom became seen as a mark of archaism.

For some Native American tribes, dragonflies represent swiftness and activity; for the Navajo, they symbolize pure water. They are a common motif in Zuni pottery; stylized as a double-barred cross, they appear in Hopi rock art and on Pueblo necklaces. Among the classical names of Japan are Akitsukuni (秋津国), Akitsushima (秋津島), Toyo-akitsushima (豊秋津島). Akitu or akidu are archaic or dialectal Japanese words for dragonfly, so one interpretation of Akitsushima is "Dragonfly Island". This is attributed to a legend in which Japan's mythical founder, Emperor Jinmu, was bitten by a mosquito, which was then eaten by a dragonfly. As a seasonal symbol in Japan, the dragonfly is associated with autumn, and more generally dragonflies are symbols of courage, strength, and happiness, and they often appear in Japanese art and literature, especially haiku.

In Europe, dragonflies have often been seen as sinister. Some English vernacular names, such as "horse-stinger", "devil's darning needle", and "ear cutter", link them with evil or injury. Swedish folklore holds that the devil uses dragonflies to weigh people's souls. The Norwegian name for dragonflies is Øyenstikker ("eye-poker"), and in Portugal, they are sometimes called tira-olhos ("eyes-snatcher"). They are often associated with snakes, as in the Welsh name gwas-y-neidr, "adder's servant". The Southern United States term "snake doctor" refers to a folk belief that dragonflies follow snakes around and stitch them back together if they are injured.

== See also ==
- Anansi
- Insects in religion
- Insectoids in science fiction and fantasy
