= Human uses of arthropods =

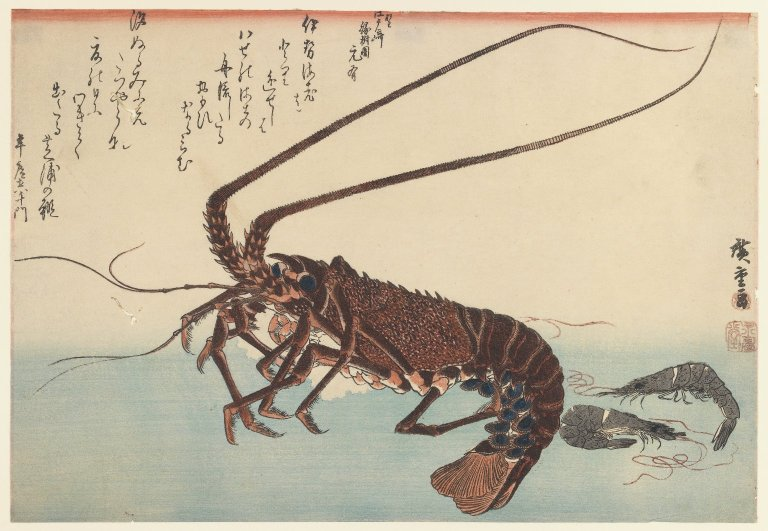
Crayfish and Two Shrimps by Utagawa Hiroshige, 1835-1845

Humans make many uses of arthropods, including as food, in art, in stories, and in mythology and religion. Many of these aspects concern insects, which are important both economically and symbolically, from the work of honeybees to the scarabs of Ancient Egypt. Other arthropods with cultural significance include crustaceans such as crabs, lobsters, and crayfish, which are popular subjects in art, especially still lifes, and arachnids such as spiders and scorpions, whose venom has medical applications. The crab and the scorpion are astrological signs of the zodiac.

== Context ==
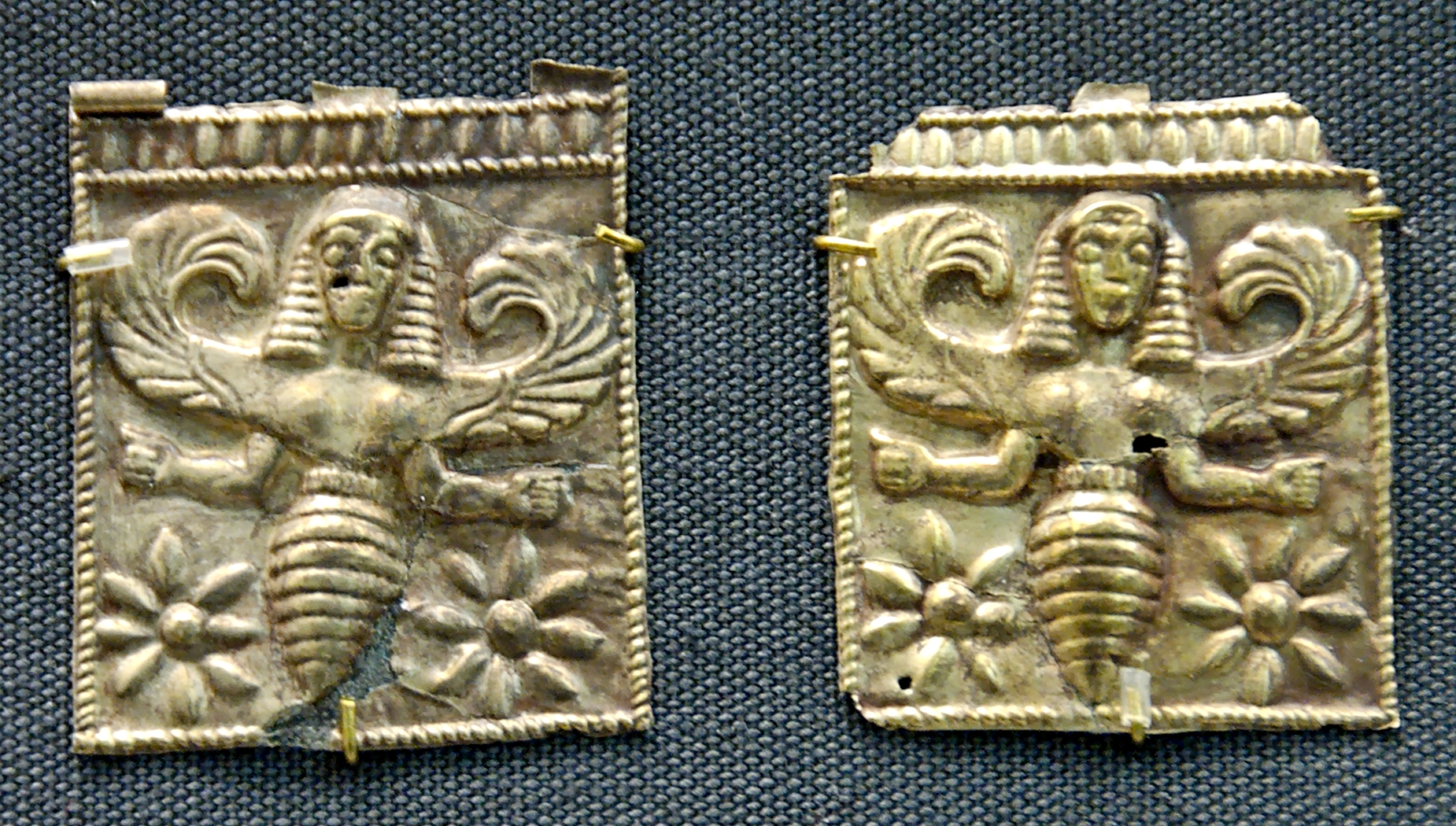
Gold plaques embossed with winged bee goddesses, perhaps the Thriai, found at Camiros Rhodes, dated to the 7th century B.C.

The arthropods are a phylum of animals with jointed legs; they include the insects, arachnids such as spiders, myriapods, and crustaceans. Insects play many roles in culture including their direct use as food, in medicine, for dyestuffs, and in science, where the common fruit fly Drosophila melanogaster serves as a model organism for work in genetics and developmental biology.

== As food ==
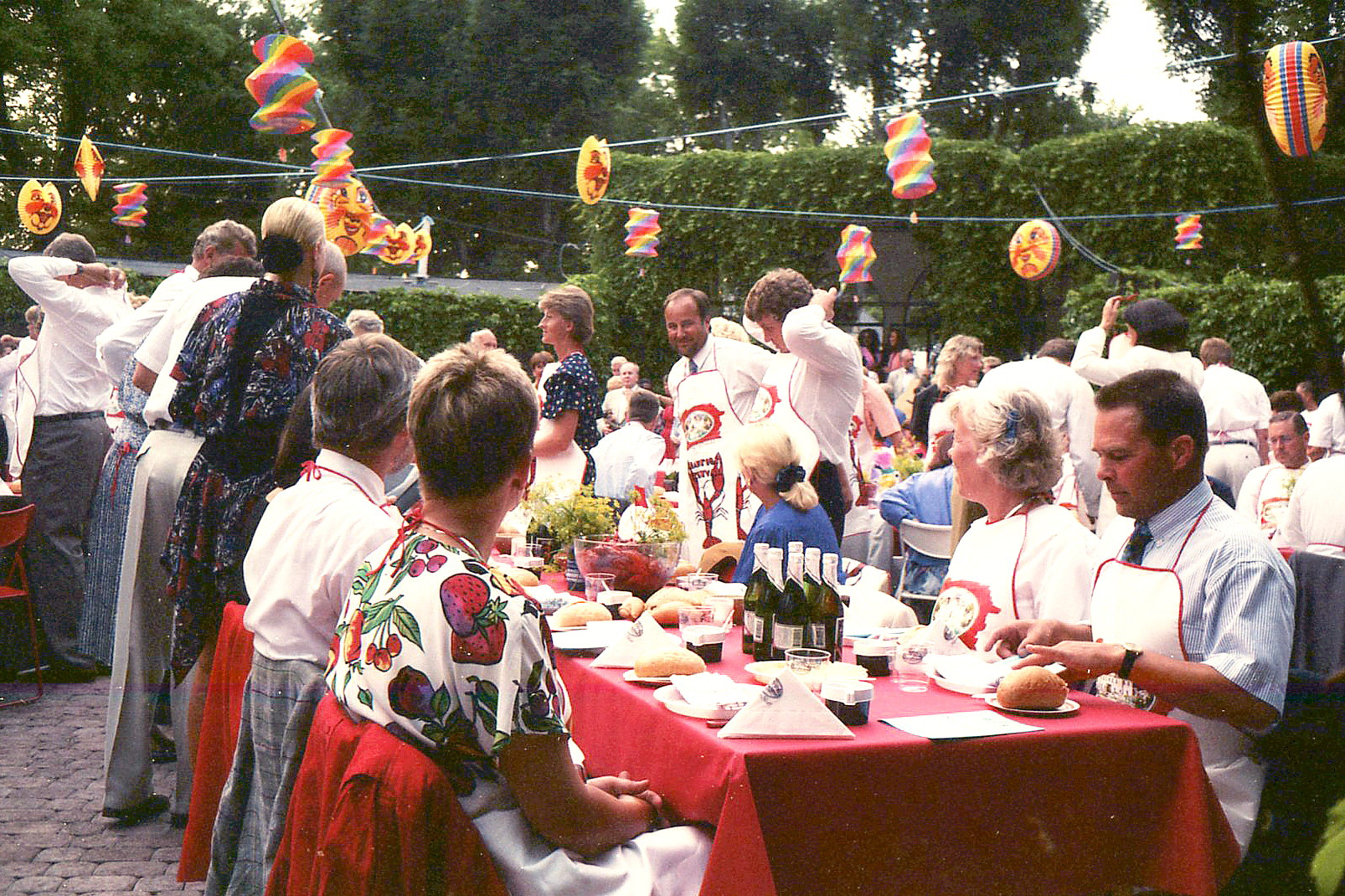
Crayfish party in Häringe Castle, Sweden 1991

Crustaceans are an important source of food, providing nearly 10,700,000 tons in 2007; the vast majority of this output is of decapods: crabs, lobsters, shrimps, crayfish, and prawns. Over 60% by weight of all crustaceans caught for consumption are shrimp and prawns, and nearly 80% is produced in Asia, with China alone producing nearly half the world's total. Non-decapod crustaceans are not widely consumed, with only 118,000 tons of krill being caught, despite krill having one of the greatest biomasses on the planet.

Crabs make up 20% of all marine crustaceans caught, farmed, and consumed worldwide, amounting to 1.5 million tonnes annually. One species, Portunus trituberculatus, accounts for one-fifth of that total. Other commercially important taxa include Portunus pelagicus, several species in the genus Chionoecetes, the blue crab (Callinectes sapidus), Charybdis spp., Cancer pagurus, the Dungeness crab (Metacarcinus magister), and Scylla serrata, each of which yields more than 20,000 tonnes annually.

Lobsters are caught using baited, one-way traps with a colour-coded marker buoy to mark cages. Lobster is fished in water between 2 and 900 metres (1 and 500 fathoms), although some lobsters live at 3,700 metres (2,000 fathoms). Cages are of plastic-coated galvanised steel or wood. A lobster fisher may tend as many as 2,000 traps. Around 2000, owing to overfishing and high demand, lobster aquaculture expanded. As of 2008, no lobster aquaculture operation had achieved commercial success, mainly because lobsters eat each other (cannibalism) and the growth of the species is slow.

Eighty percent of the world's nations eat insects of 1,000 to 2,000 species. Insects used as food around the world include crickets, cicadas, grasshoppers, ants, various beetle grubs (such as mealworms, the larvae of the darkling beetle), and various species of caterpillar (such as bamboo worms, mopani worms, silkworms and waxworms).

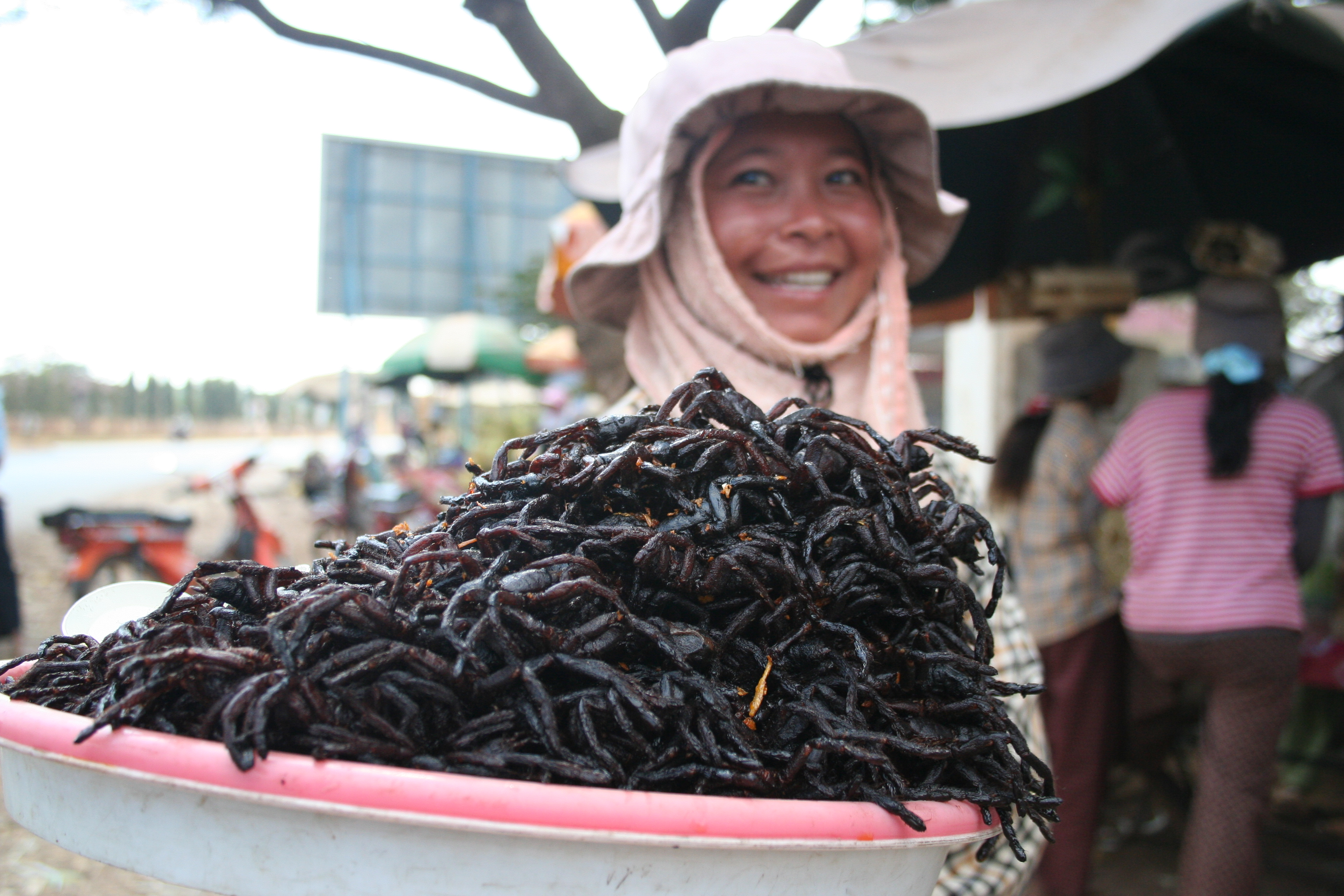
Cooked tarantula spiders are a delicacy in Cambodia.

Arachnids such as spiders, scorpions, or mite are also used as food worldwide. Fried tarantula spiders are considered a delicacy in Cambodia, and by the Piaroa Indians of southern Venezuela – provided the highly irritant hairs, the spiders' main defence system, are removed first.

== In science and engineering ==
Insects feature in a variety of ways in biomimicry, where, for example, the cooling system of termite mounds has been imitated in architecture.

Spider venoms may be a less polluting alternative to conventional pesticides, as they are deadly to insects, but the great majority are harmless to vertebrates. Australian funnel web spiders are a promising source, as most of the world's insect pests have had no opportunity to develop any immunity to their venom, and funnel web spiders thrive in captivity and are easy to "milk". It may be possible to target specific pests by engineering genes for the production of spider toxins into viruses that infect species such as cotton bollworms.

Because spider silk is both light and strong, attempts are being made to produce it in goats' milk and in the leaves of plants, by means of genetic engineering.

== In medicine ==
The Ch'ol Maya use a beverage created from the tarantula Brachypelma vagans for a condition they term 'tarantula wind', the symptoms of which include chest pain, asthma and coughing. The peptide GsMtx-4, found in the venom, has been studied for possible use in cardiac arrhythmia, muscular dystrophy, and glioma. Possible medical uses for other spider venoms have been investigated for the treatment of cardiac arrhythmia, Alzheimer's disease, strokes, and erectile dysfunction.

== In folklore, mythology and religion ==
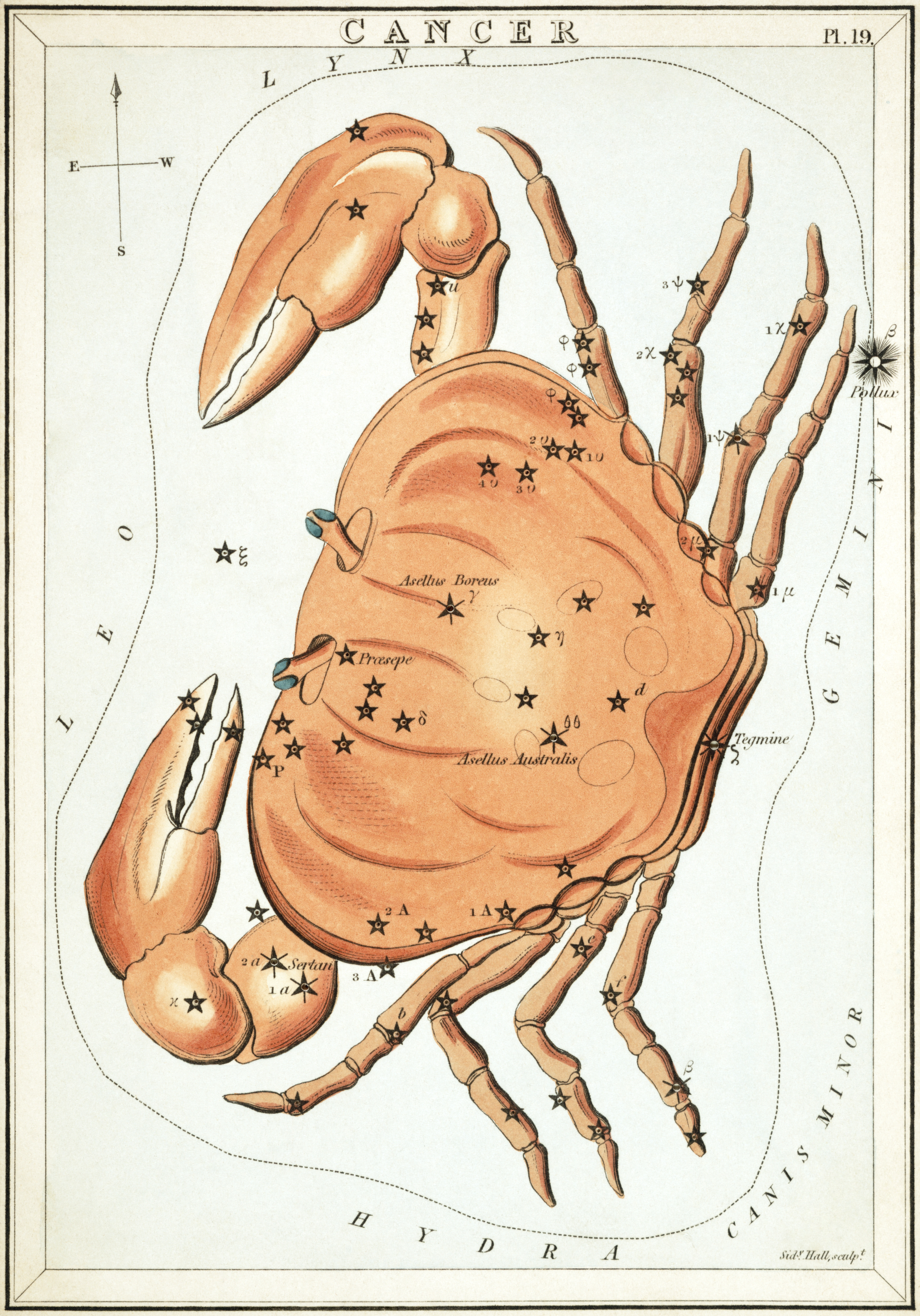
The constellation of Cancer, the crab, from Urania's Mirror, c. 1825

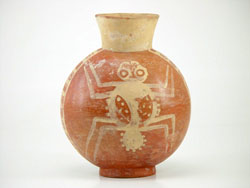
Moche ceramic spider, c. 300 AD

Arthropods appear in folklore, in mythology, and in religion. Since Insects in mythology and in religion are covered elsewhere, this section focuses on other arthropods.

Both the constellation Cancer and the astrological sign Cancer are named after the crab, and depicted as a crab. William Parsons, 3rd Earl of Rosse drew the Crab Nebula in 1848 and noticed its similarity to the animal; the Crab Pulsar lies at the centre of the nebula. The Moche people of ancient Peru worshipped nature, especially the sea, and often depicted crabs in their art. In Greek mythology, Karkinos was a crab that came to the aid of the Lernaean Hydra as it battled Heracles. One of Rudyard Kipling's Just So Stories, The Crab that Played with the Sea, tells the story of a gigantic crab who made the waters of the sea go up and down, like the tides.

In the Japanese fairy tale "My Lord Bag of Rice", the warrior Fujiwara no Hidesato slays a giant centipede, Ōmukade, to help a dragon princess.

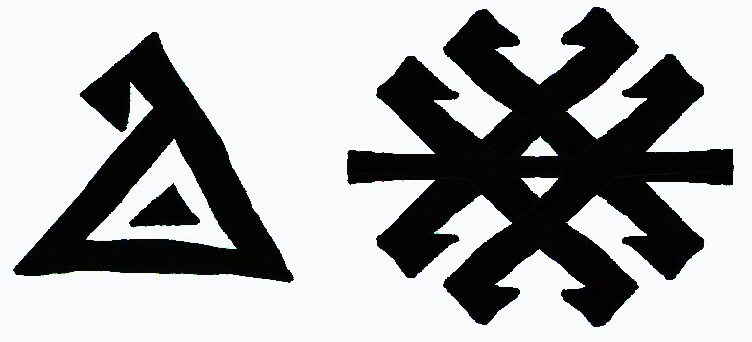
Scorpion motif is often woven into Turkish kilim flatweave carpets, for protection from their sting (2 examples).

Spiders have been depicted in stories, mythologies and the arts of many cultures for centuries. They have symbolized patience due to their hunting technique of setting webs and waiting for prey, as well as mischief and malice due to their venomous bites. The Italian tarantella is a dance supposedly to rid the young woman of the lustful effects of a bite by the tarantula wolf spider, Lycosa tarantula. Web-spinning caused the association of the spider with creation myths, as they seem to produce their own worlds. Dreamcatchers are depictions of spiderwebs. The Moche people of ancient Peru worshipped nature, emphasising animals and often depicting spiders in their art.

The scorpion appeared as the astrological sign Scorpio, in the twelve signs of the Zodiac, created by Babylonian astronomers during the Chaldean period, around 600 BC. In South Africa and South Asia, the scorpion is a significant animal culturally, appearing as a motif in art, especially in Islamic art in the Middle East. A scorpion motif is often woven into Turkish kilim flatweave carpets, for protection from their sting. The scorpion is perceived both as an embodiment of evil and a protective force that counters evil, such as a dervish's powers to combat evil. In another context, the scorpion portrays human sexuality. Scorpions are used in folk medicine in South Asia especially in antidotes for scorpion stings. In ancient Egypt the goddess Serket was often depicted as a scorpion, one of several goddesses who protected the Pharaoh.

== In art, literature, and music ==
Insects feature in art, in literature, in film, and in music.

The "Lobster Quadrille", also known as "The Mock Turtle's Song", is a song recited by the Mock Turtle in Alice's Adventures in Wonderland, chapters 9 and 10, accompanied by a dance.

The surrealist artist Salvador Dalí created a sculpture called Lobster Telephone with the crustacean in place of the traditional handset, resting in the cradle above the dial. The Surrealist filmmaker Luis Buñuel used scorpions in his 1930 classic L'Age d'or (The Golden Age).

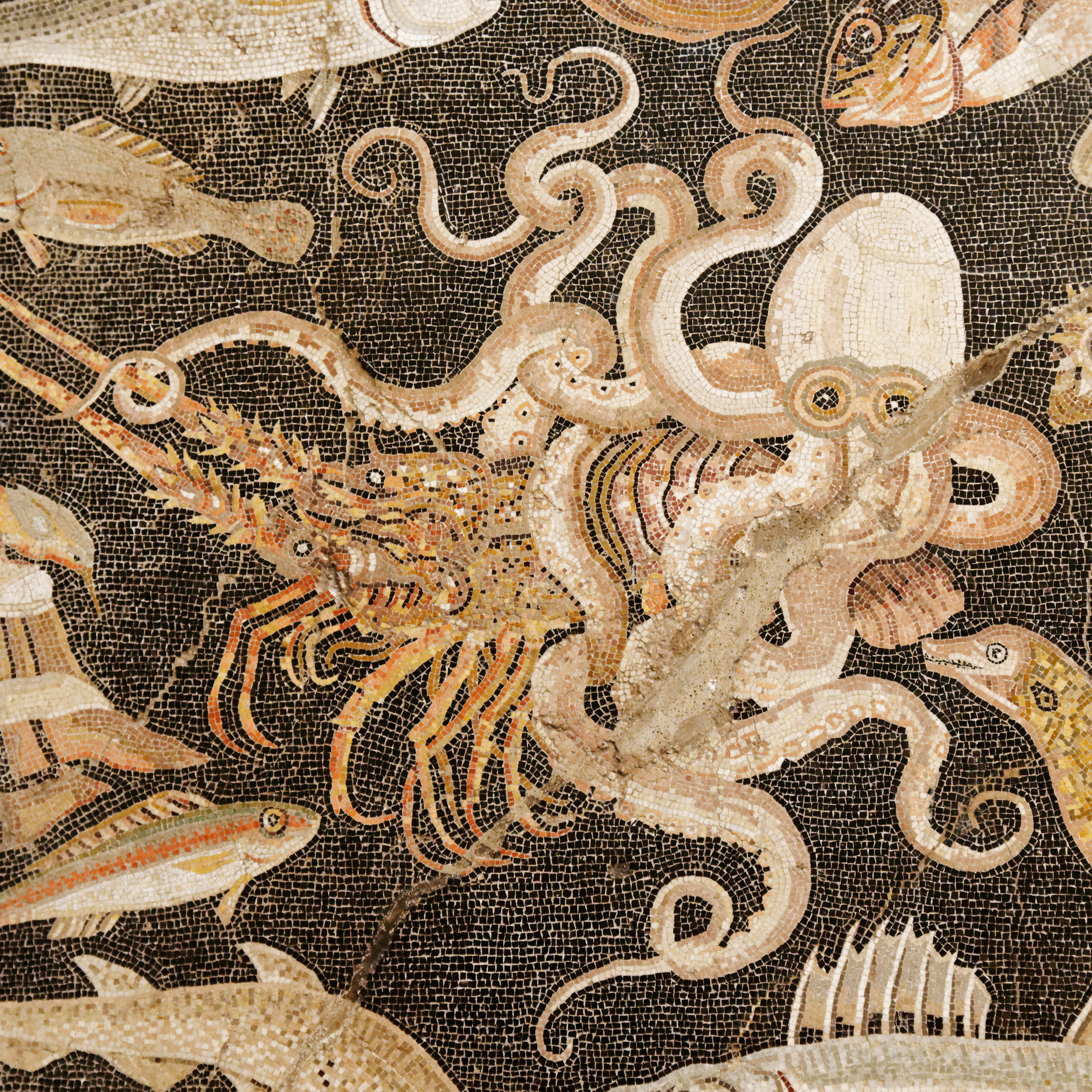
Crustaceans in Roman mosaic in the 'House of the Dancing Faun', Pompeii (by 79 AD)

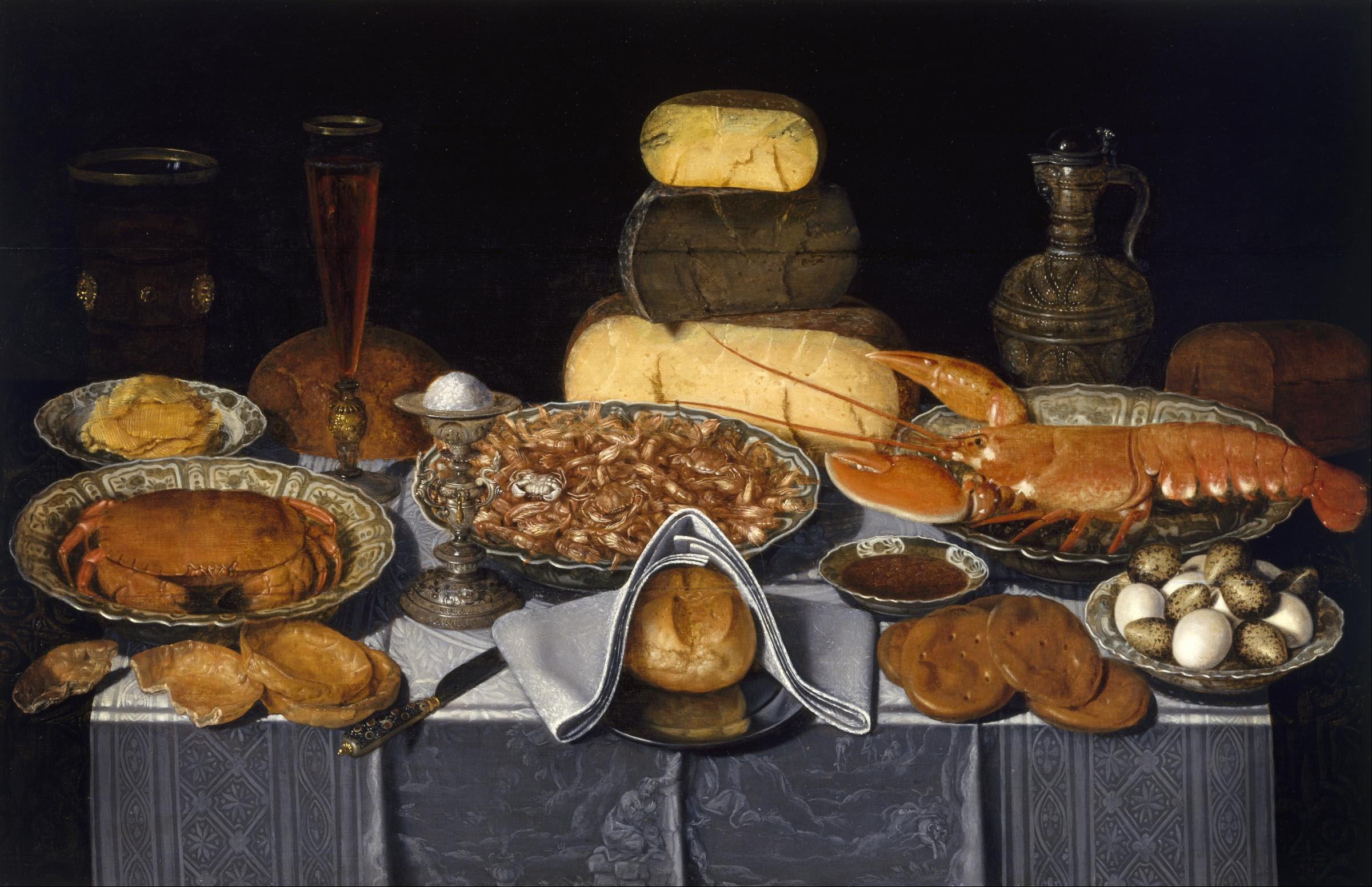
Still Life with Crab, Shrimps and Lobster, Clara Peeters, c. 1600

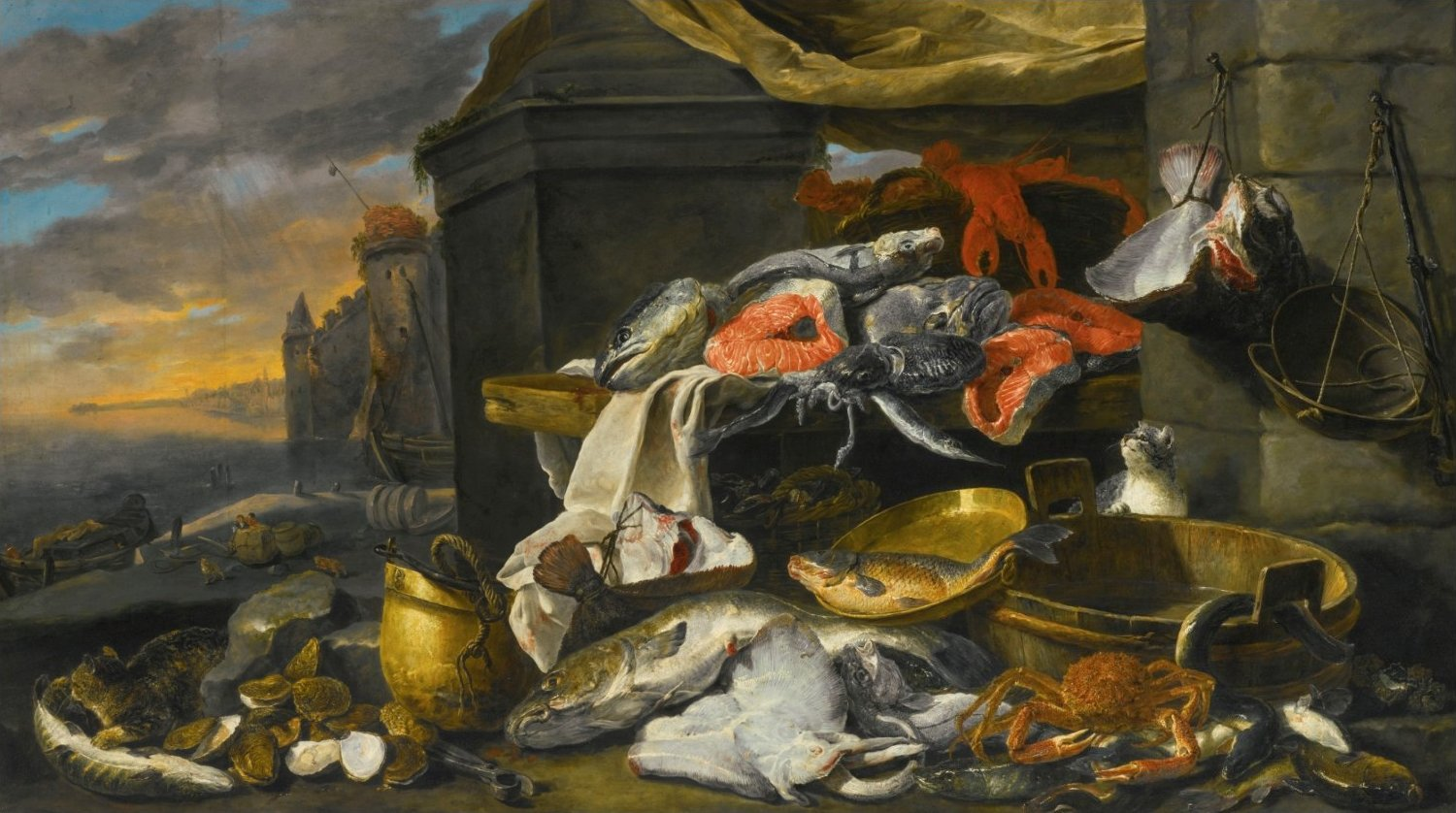
Fish, oysters, a crab and a lobster with cats..., Jan Fyt, c. 1650

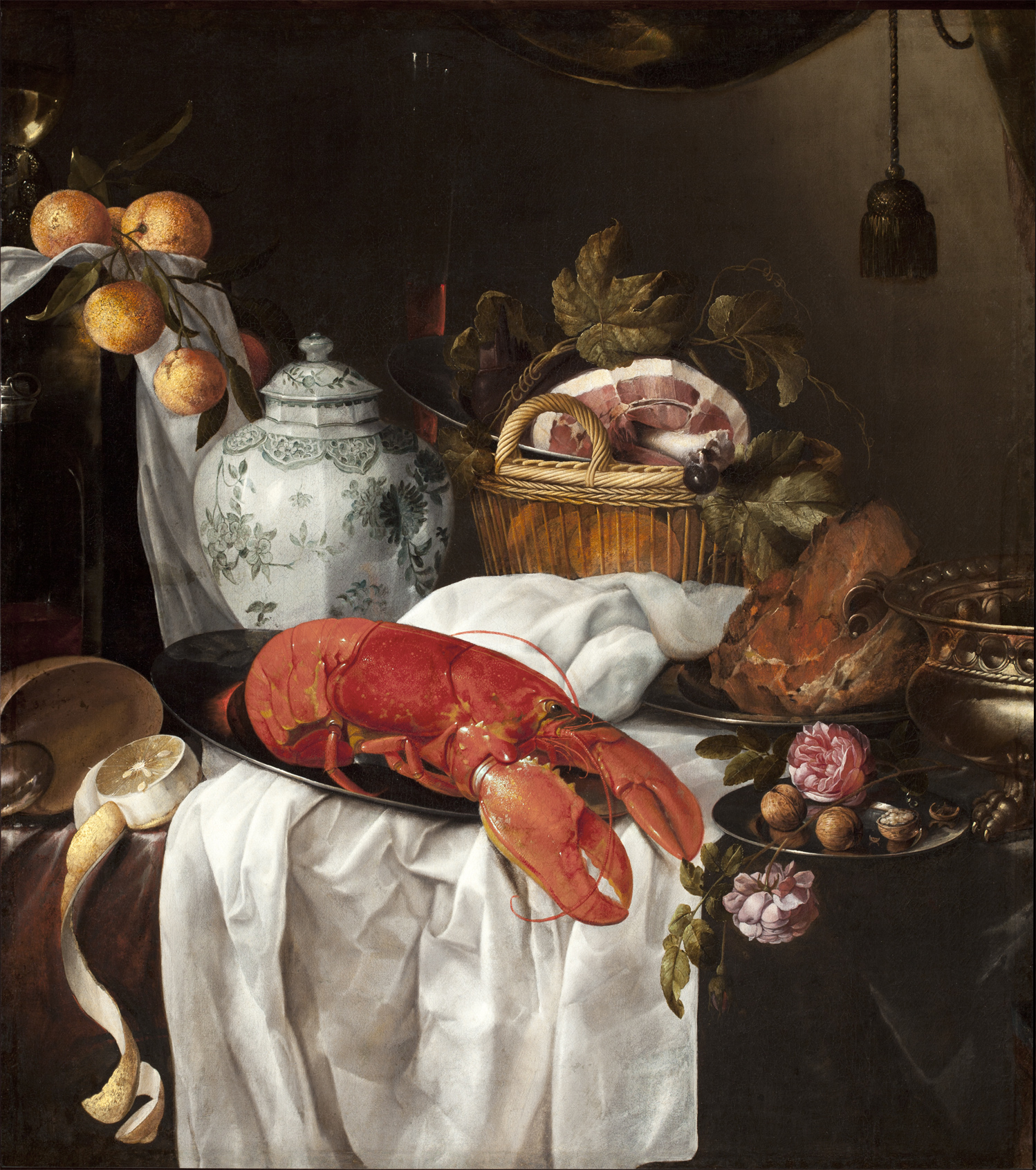
Pronk Still life with lobster, Jasper Geeraerts, 1650–1654

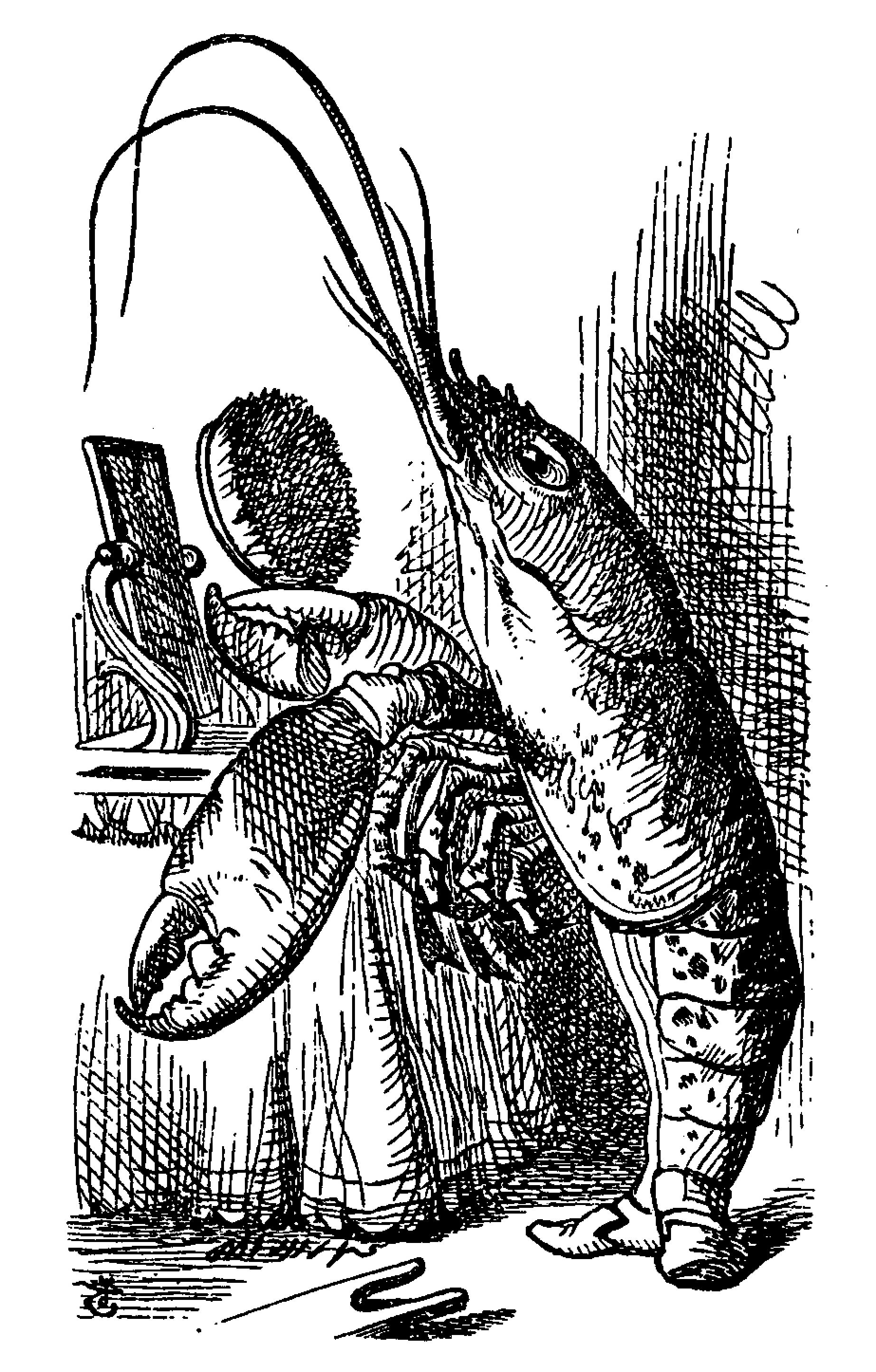
Lewis Carroll's lobster, drawn by Sir John Tenniel, 1869

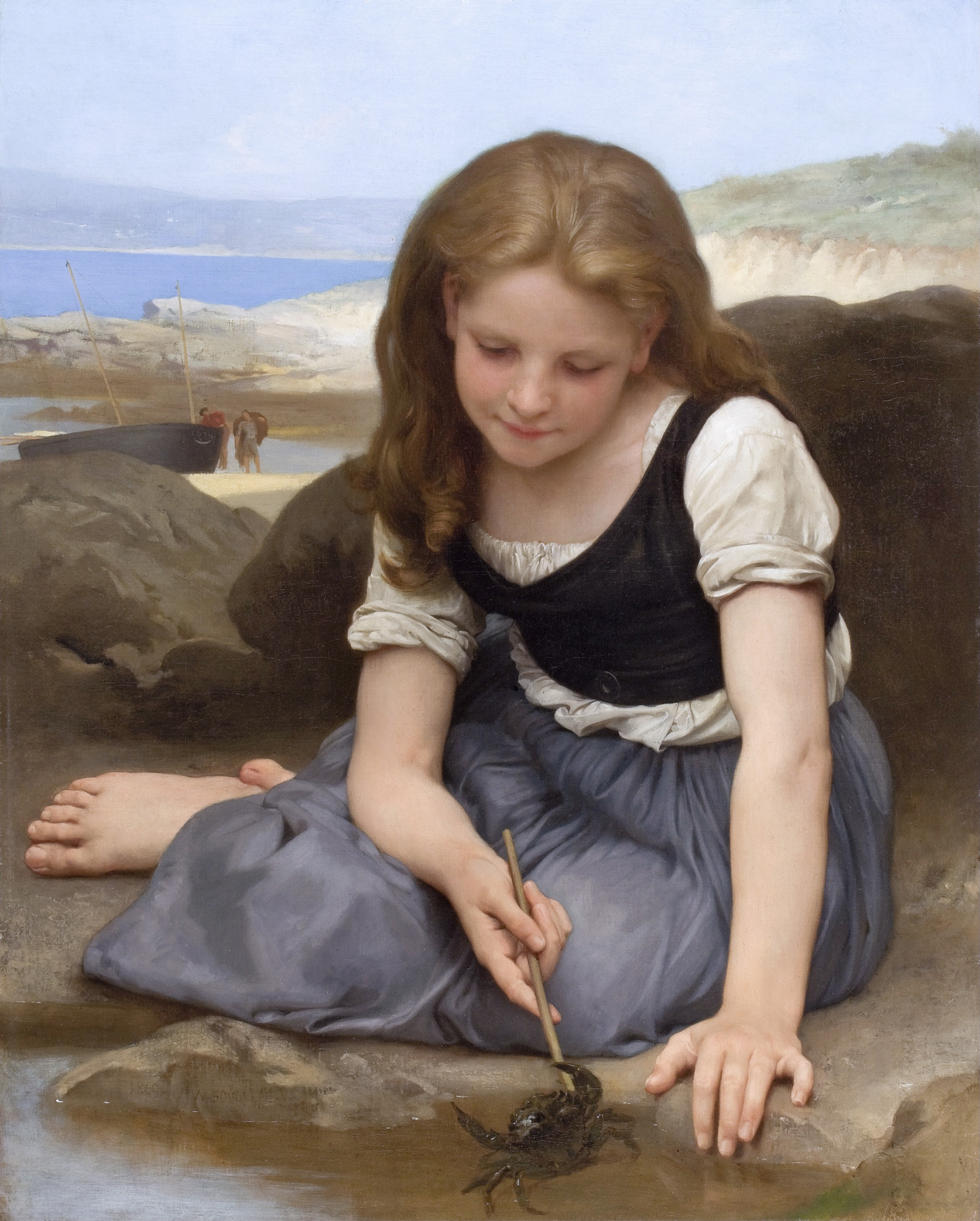
Le Crabe by William-Adolphe Bouguereau, 1869

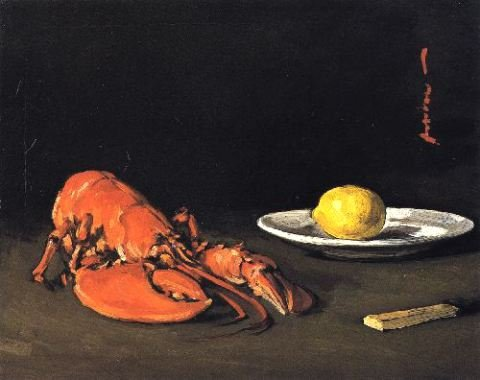
The Lobster by Samuel Peploe, c. 1903

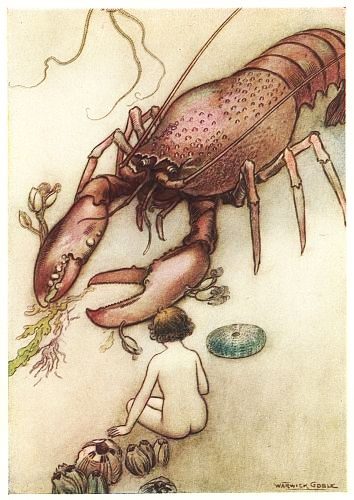
Illustration from The Water-Babies by Charles Kingsley, illustrated by Warwick Goble (d. 1943)

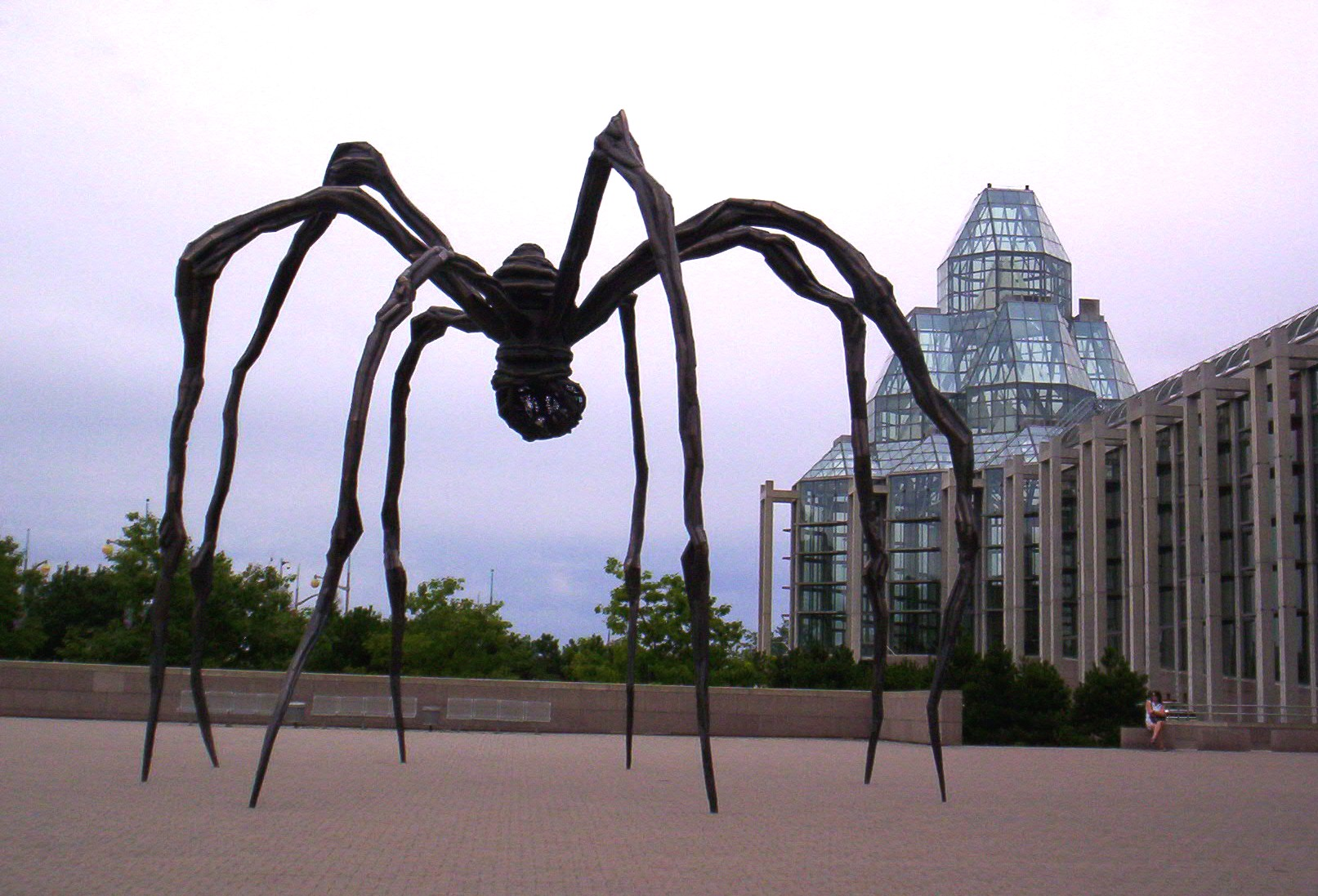
Maman sculpture by Louise Bourgeois at the National Gallery of Canada, 1999

== See also ==
- Cultural depictions of spiders
