= Mugulu =

Mugulu may refer to:

- Ggulu, character in Gandan creation myth
- Yujiulü Mugulü, first leader of the Rourans
