= Insectoids in science fiction and fantasy =

Insect-like creatures

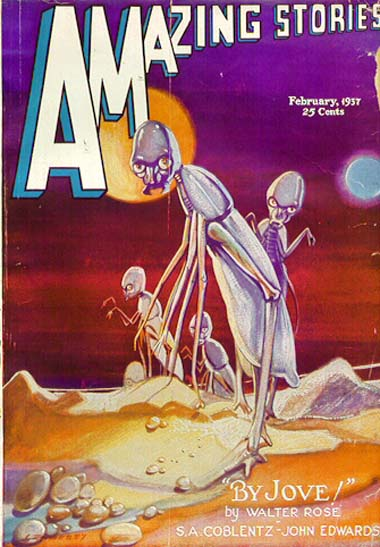
An insectoid alien on the cover of American science fiction magazine Amazing Stories from 1937

In science fiction and fantasy literatures, the term insectoid ("insect-like") denotes any fantastical fictional creature sharing physical or other traits with ordinary insects (or arachnids). Most frequently, insect-like or spider-like extraterrestrial life forms is meant; in such cases convergent evolution may presumably be responsible for the existence of such creatures. Occasionally, an Earth-bound setting — such as in the film The Fly (1958), in which a scientist is accidentally transformed into a human–fly hybrid, or Franz Kafka's novella The Metamorphosis (1915), which does not bother to explain how a man becomes an enormous insect — is the venue.

== Etymology ==
The term insectoid denotes any creature or object that shares a similar body or traits with common earth insects and arachnids. The term is a combination of "insect" and "-oid" (a suffix denoting similarity).

== History ==
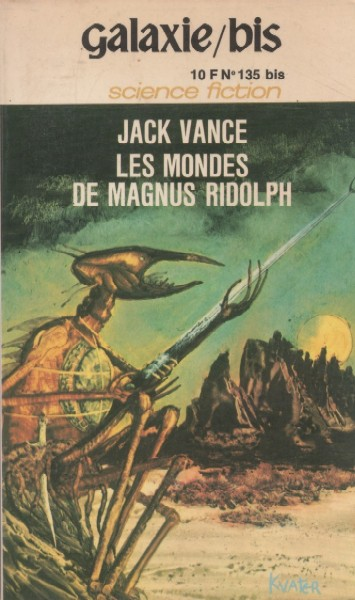
Insectoid alien on the cover of French science fiction magazine Galaxie bis from 1975

Insect-like extraterrestrials have long been a part of the tradition of science fiction. In the 1902 film A Trip to the Moon, Georges Méliès portrayed the Selenites (moon inhabitants) as insectoid. The Woggle-Bug appeared in L. Frank Baum's Oz books beginning in 1904. Olaf Stapledon incorporates insectoids in his 1937 Star Maker novel. In the pulp fiction novels, insectoid creatures were frequently used as the antagonists threatening the damsel in distress. Notable later depictions of hostile insect aliens include the antagonistic "Arachnids", or "Bugs", in Robert A. Heinlein's novel Starship Troopers (1959) and the "buggers" in Orson Scott Card's Ender's Game series (from 1985).

The hive mind, or group mind, is a theme in science fiction going back to the alien hive society depicted in H. G. Wells's The First Men in the Moon (1901). Hive minds often imply a lack, or loss, of individuality, identity, or personhood. The individuals forming the hive may specialize in different functions, in the manner of social insects. The hive queen has been a figure in novels including C. J. Cherryh's Serpent's Reach (1981) and the Alien film franchise (from 1979).

Insectoid sexuality has been addressed in Philip José Farmer's The Lovers (1952) Octavia Butler's Xenogenesis novels (from 1987) and China Miéville's Perdido Street Station (2000).

== Analysis ==
The motif of the insect became widely used in science fiction as an "abject human/insect hybrids that form the most common enemy" in related media. Bugs or bug-like shapes have been described as a common trope in them, and the term 'insectoid' is considered "almost a cliche" with regards to the "ubiquitous way of representing alien life".

In expressing his ambivalence with regard to science fiction, insectoids were on his mind when Carl Sagan complained of the type of story which "simply ignores what we know of molecular biology and Darwinian evolution.... I have...problems with films in which spiders 30 feet tall are menacing the cities of earth: Since insects and arachnids breathe by diffusion, such marauders would asphyxiate before they could savage their first metropolis".

== See also ==
- Bug-eyed monster
- District 9
- Insects in mythology
- Insects in religion
- List of fictional arthropods
- List of reptilian humanoids
- List of piscine and amphibian humanoids
