= Tanda pits =

Archeological site in Uganda

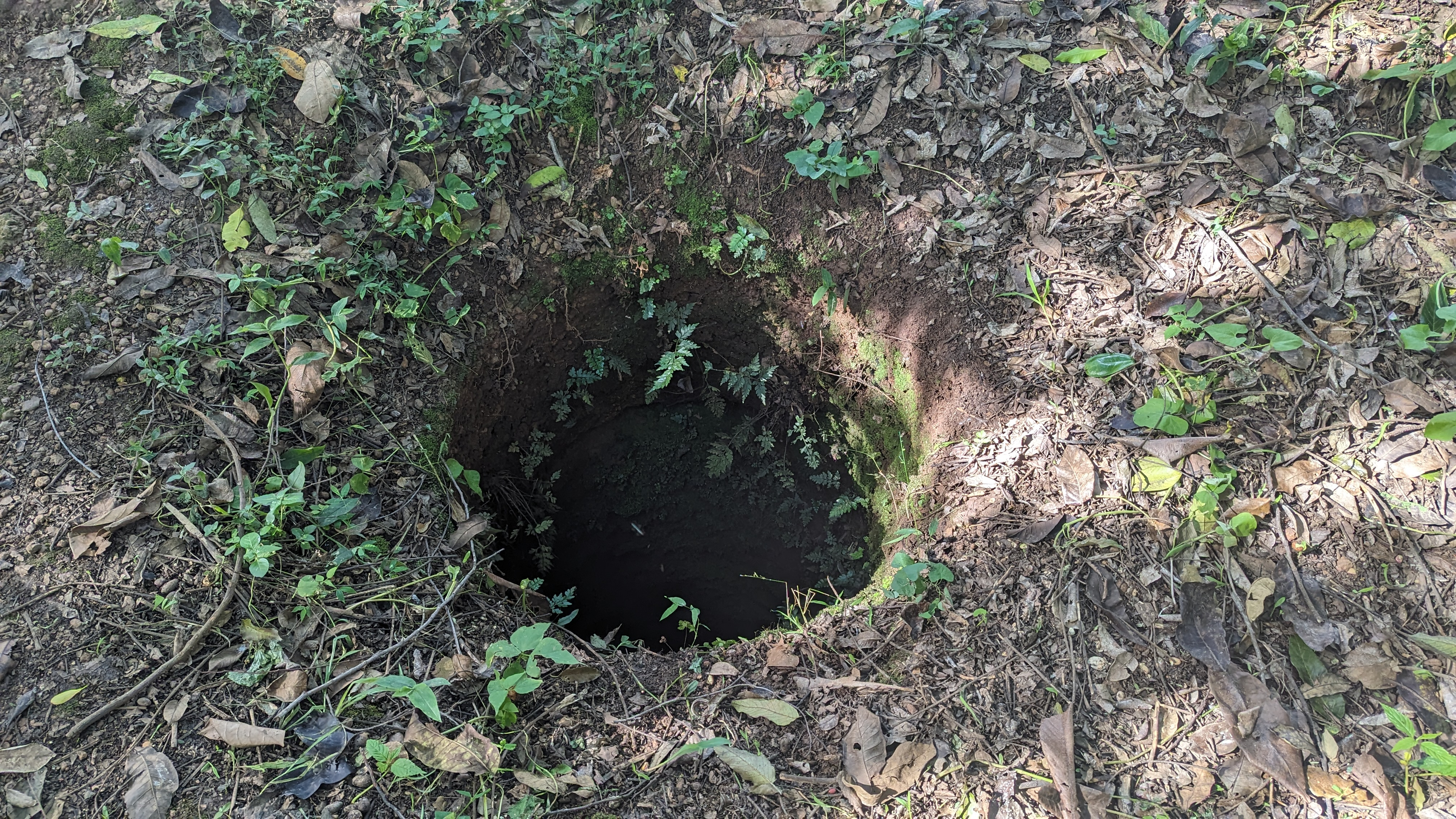
One of the pits at Tanda

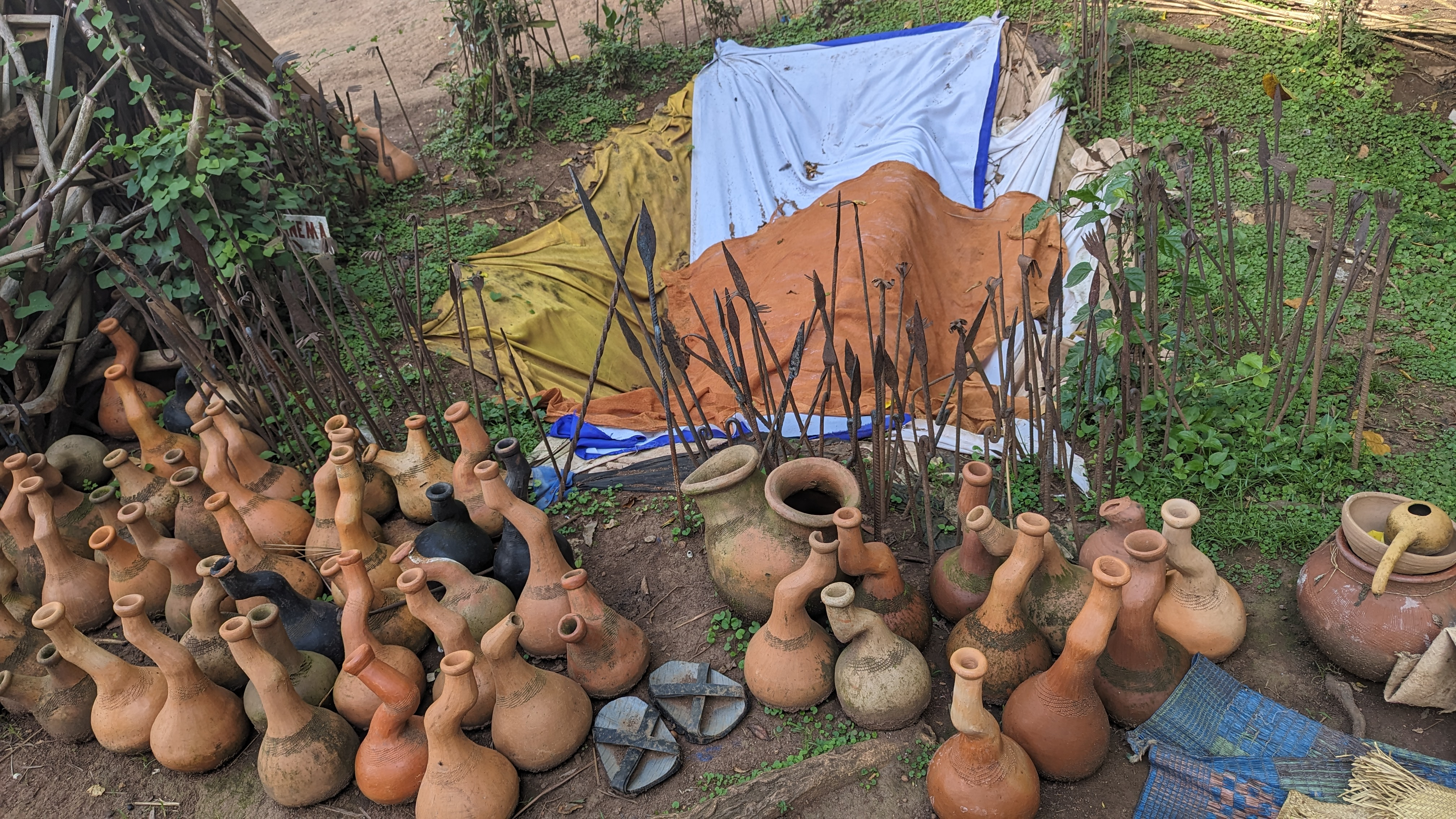
Ttanda Archaeological Pits

The Tanda pits (or Tanda Archaeological Site) near the town of Mityana, Uganda, are a group of over 240 circular pits in the forest. They are said to be caused by Walumbe, a central character in the creation myth of Kintu. Walumbe is a personification of death, and when he is being forced to return to heaven, he stomps on the ground, opening up pits to hide in.

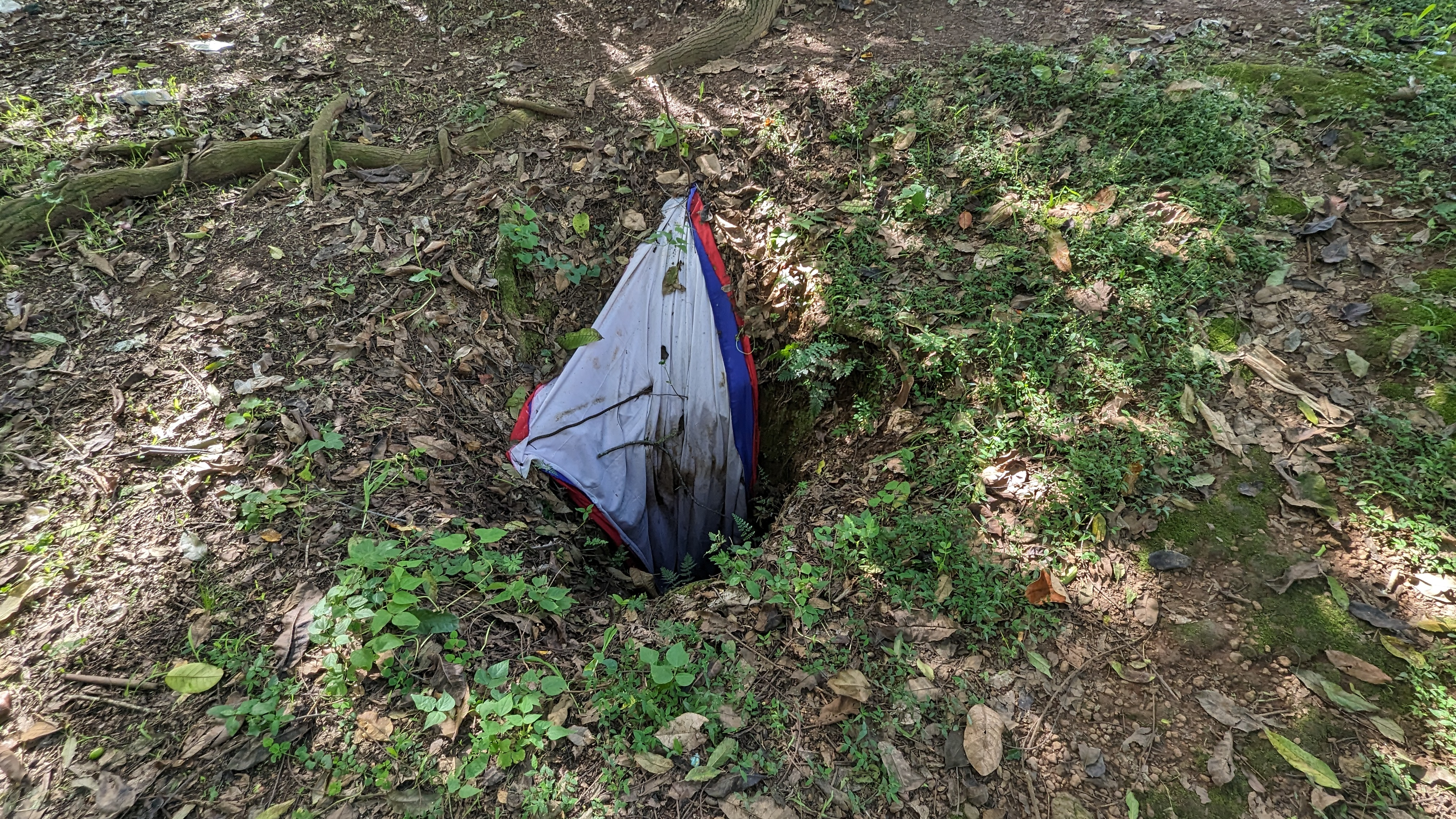
Ttanda Archaeological Pits - Ennyanga Za Walumbe, Ttanda

The pits, which according to Christopher Wrigley are "actually old iron-workings but thought of as entrances to the land of death", were fast becoming a "famous tourism destination" by 2018. The "Tanda Archives" are housed in a modern building, powered by solar panels and with "clean latrines preserved for visitors". According to one of the tour guides, only few facilities are built, in order to avoid "compromising the environment and cultural integrity". Guides speak various languages including English, French, and Swahili.

== Location ==
The archaeological site lies on the south side of Fort Portal Road about 48 kilometres west of Kampala's Busega Roundabout and 9 kilometres east of the Enro Hotel in Mityana. It's almost 2 kilometres from the junction to the entrance gate.

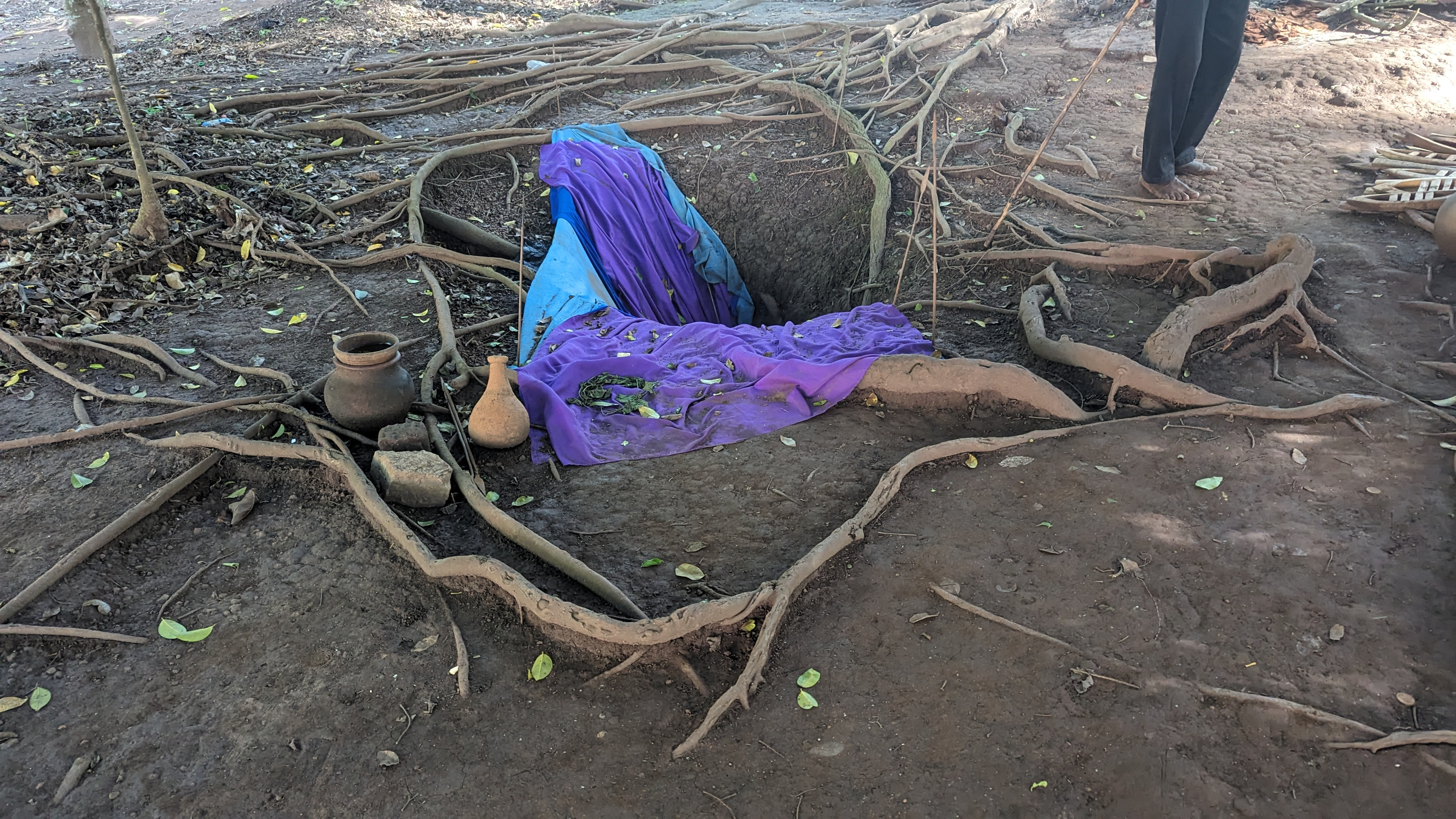
Ttanda Archaeological Pits - Ennyanga Za Walumbe Ttanda.
