= Nambi (mythology) =

Figure in Ugandan mythology

Nambi is the daughter of Mugulu, also known as Ggulu in some versions of Baganda mythology. In the Ugandan creation myth, it is Nambi and her younger sister who discover Kintu, the first man. Nambi helps Kintu throughout his journey and trials, and eventually becomes his wife and mother of his children.

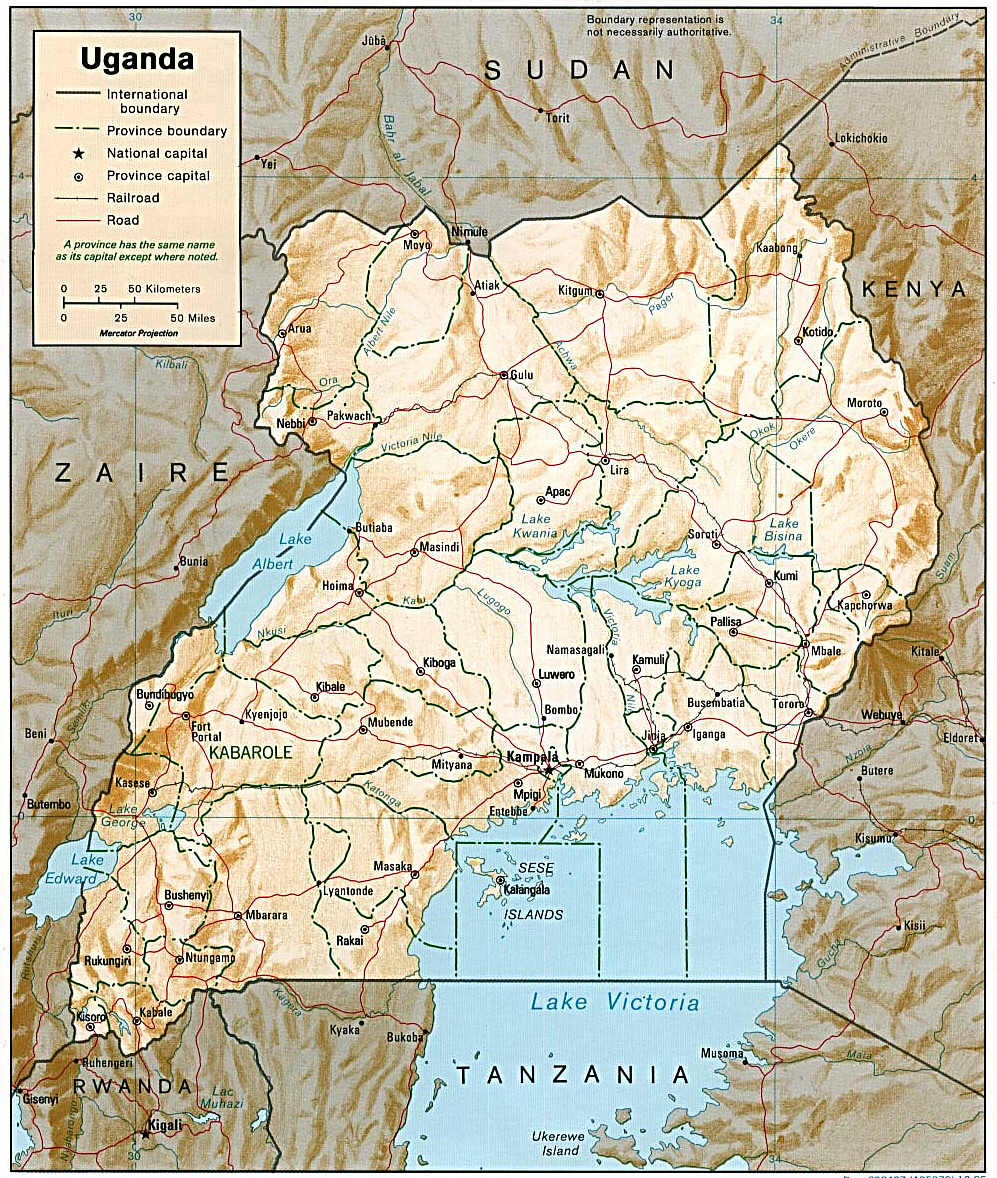
Map of Uganda

== Mythological character ==
The Ugandan creation story begins with Kintu, the first man, wandering Earth with only his possessions on him and his cow. For many days he wandered in Uganda alone, until suddenly, Nambi and her younger sister dropped down from heaven. Nambi is curious to see the man, unknowing who or what he is, nor what kind of creature his cow is. Kintu also sees the sisters, but instead of approaching them, keeps his distance. Nambi eventually approaches Kintu, asking what animal is with him and tells him that neither her nor her sister had ever seen a man before. After their meeting, Nambi and her sister discuss the interaction. Nambi decides that Kintu is a man, and upon asking him if this is true, she is proved correct. Nambi shares with Kintu about herself and her sister and insists they all return to her father in heaven together. Kintu insists that his cow must be taken along, but Nambi declines, and the sisters return to heaven alone.

When Nambi and her sister return to Mugulu, they tell him of their findings. Nambi tells her father that she would like to bring him up to heaven but Mugulu tells her that he will take care of the matter and dismisses her. Mugulu then tells his sons to go down to earth and to only retrieve the cow because he believed that Kintu would perish shortly anyway. Without his cow, his only source of food and drink, Kintu became angry and restless. The next day Nambi observes only the cow in heaven and becomes very upset, stating that tomorrow she will go down from heaven and bring Kintu to her father herself.

Nambi brings Kintu up to heaven and shows him all the resources and people they have in plenty. When Mugulu hears from his sons that Kintu had been brought to heaven, he begins setting up the first of many tasks he wants Kintu to accomplish. Kintu quickly completes his first task of eating an overabundance of food and impresses Mugulu. Mugulu then creates a second task for Kintu to accomplish and tells him if he does so, that he will have his cow back and will take Nambi's hand in marriage. After three more impossible tasks are completed by Kintu, Mugulu tells him to take Nambi and his cow and return to earth. Mugulu also packs them a bag of crops and one hen but warns them not to return to heaven, for they may encounter Nambi's evil brother, Walumbe.

Nambi and Kintu set on their journey back to Uganda but discovered they had forgotten the millet to feed the hen. Ignoring Mugulu's wishes, Kintu sets back to heaven and when he arrives, comes across Walumbe who inquires about Nambi's whereabouts. Walumbe accompanies Kintu back to earth and they soon reunite with Nambi. Nambi insists that Walumbe return home to heaven, but eventually it is decided that he will live with them on earth for a short period of time. Nambi, Kintu, and Walumbe settle in Magongo, a part of Uganda, and Nambi begins growing the crops as they settle in.

After some time Nambi and Kintu had three children, but Walumbe wants one of them to be his own to help him with daily tasks. Nambi and Kintu avoid his question, telling him that one day he will have one of them. Nambi continues having more children, and Walumbe grows upset because he still has no helper. Walumbe claims that day by day, he will kill one child until he feels that justice is served. Walumbe follows through on his proclamation, and each day, one of Kintu and Nambi's children dies. Kintu goes back to heaven to tell Mugulu their troubles. Mugulu explains that he had warned them about Walumbe but that he would send his son Kayiikuuzi down to earth to capture Walumbe. Walumbe and Kayiikuuzi begin to fight, but Walumbe quickly jumps into a hole in the ground, escaping Kayiikuuzi's every attempt to grasp him. Kayiikuuzi formulates a plan of two days of silence, claiming that Walumbe will come up from the ground to see why no one is making noise. Kayiikuuzi's plan works and he captures and Walumbe comes out in Tanda Pits, a different area of Uganda. When he comes across children who scream when they notice his presence, breaking the silence. Kayiikuuzi, frustrated, states that he will no longer partake in bringing Walumbe back to Mugulu in heaven, and Walumbe remained in Uganda.

== Historical figure ==
Nambi and Kintu in the Ugandan creation myth are rooted to Kato Kintu and Nambi Nantuttululu, historical figures from the fourteenth century Kingdom of Buganda.

== Uses for modern reception ==
- Nambi is seen in The Quest for Kintu and the Search for Peace: Mythology and Morality in Nineteenth-Century Buganda, alongside her husband Kintu. It is said in this journal that in Nineteenth-century Buganda, political leaders tried to unite back the kingdom by re-telling the creation myth and reminding those living in Buganda of where their constitutional and social roots come from. At the time, there was strife between the kingdom and the issue of war versus peace was at the root of the problem. During the time of Kabaka Mutesa's rule, violence in the Kingdom of Buganda peaked. In a narrative recounted by Sir Apolo Kaggwa, once Kintu and Nambi returned home to Earth and Warumbe had established his residence with them as well, Kintu began creating political roles, geographical boundaries, and civil defense methods. It is after establishing these that Nambi is found to be having an affair in this version of the myth, and consequently Kintu disappears for many years, during which the Chwa dynasty take the throne. The Chwa dynasty are assumed to be directly related to Kintu and it is stated that their Kabaka's followed the same ruling styles that Kintu possessed. Political leaders in Uganda then took this story, and used it to challenge Kabaka Mutesa, stating that all Kabakas should rule as Kintu and Chwa did, and that the ideals they possessed, such as non-violence and compassion, should be passed on from ruler to ruler.
- Nambi and other characters from the Bugandian creation story can be seen in "Kyazze Tekizzikayo- Short Ugandan Musical Film". This short film highlights and shows Nambi and Kintu's initial introduction, as well as their interactions with Warumbe, all told through musical styling.
- Nambi (film) is also adapted into a 2023 Ugandan film written and directed by Peter Mikiibi and produced by Dennis Arthur Abwakat and Usama Mukwaya.

== Other narratives of the Ugandan creation story ==
- In Kintu: The Myth, Nambi is the only daughter of Ggulu. Her and her brothers were playing on earth one day when they spotted him. While all of her brothers returned to heaven, she remained in Buganda to get to know Kintu better. After getting to know each other, they decided to marry one another and return to heaven to get Ggulu's approval. Ggulu creates tasks for Kintu to accomplish, and upon his completion of them, allows them to return to earth as man and wife. The rest of the myth follows as the one in Introduction to Mythology: Contemporary Approaches to Classical and World Myths.
- In The Quest for Kintu and the Search for Peace: Mythology and Morality in Nineteenth-Century Buganda, a different narrative of the Ugandan creation story is accounted. In Sabadu's version of the myth, after Kintu completed the tasks set by Mugulu and Nambi and Kintu return to earth, Nambi bore two sons and two daughters every year who each came out of the womb fully grown. After many years, Buganda was filled with thriving people, animals, and plants. Kintu then cut off pieces of his personal banana and tuber tree and tells his descendants to make life elsewhere for themselves. However, Kintu and Nambi never warned those leaving to teach right from wrong or good from evil to their offspring, so many of the descendants became wicked and unjust. He then goes to Nambi, telling her that they must leave and travel elsewhere. Their sons searched for them day and night, but when they could not be found, Chwa assumed the throne, thus leading to the second Kabaka after Kintu who is historically recognized. This also marked the beginning of the long lineage of kings of Buganda, which is now on its 36th king, King Ronald Muwenda Mutebi II, whose lineage can be traced back to Kintu.
- The Voice of Africa, a poem by Y.B. Lubambula recites a different narrative of how Kintu and Nambi initially meet. The poem begins with Kintu trapping different insects and animals, all of which he released after forming a blood-bond with them. One day, he comes to his trap and sees that instead of insects and animals, he has trapped a woman. The woman introduces herself as Nambi and requests a pole, a reed, and a blade of grass. The next day, a house had formed for the two of them. Nambi then plants a sweet-potato, which sprouted into many crops and grew rapidly. The next day, they find a cow eating the crops, so they trap it and domesticate it. A few days later Kintu cannot find Nambi; one of the insects he had previously caught and formed a bond with informs him that they are up in Heaven. It is here that Kintu meets Mugulu and begins completing his tasks for survival and for Nambi's hand in marriage.
