= Banbhori =

Banbhori Bhramari Devi
- Village
- Location within Haryana Location within India
- Coordinates: 29.405852°N 76.043382°E
- Country: India
- State: Haryana
- District: Hisar

Government
  - Type: Local government
  - Body: Panchayat

Languages
  - Official: Hindi
- Time zone: UTC+5:30 (IST)
- PIN: 125121
- Vehicle registration: HR-20
- Website: haryana.gov.in

Banbhori (also spelt as Banbhauri) is a village in Hisar district of Haryana state of northwestern India.

== Location ==
Banbhori is located on "Hisar-Barwala-Banhori-Uchana Road" 15 km northeast of Uchana, 55 km northeast of Hisar, 45 km north of Hansi, 170 km northwest IGI Delhi Airport, 200 km southwest of Chandigarh.

== Shri Durga Mata Bhramari Mandir ==
Shri Durga Mata Bhramari Mandir, run by the Government of Haryana's Shri Durga Mata Mandir Banbhori Temple Trust, is an ancient shakti peeth temple dedicated to Hindu deity Bhramari as a manifestation of Durga Shakti (feminine manifestation of God). In November 2017, Government of Haryana cabinet brought this privately managed temple under the ownership of government trust so that the annual donations of INR15 crore (in 2017) can be used for welfare of local populace.

=== Legend ===
According to the legend the Goddess Banbhori is manifestation of Bhagwati (Shakti) who manifested as a swarm of bees (bramar in sanskrit language) to kill the demon Arunasura, who was disturbing the penance of sages. This temple is located where she manifested.

=== Temple complex ===
Her statue in the temple, also called the Ashtabhuji Mata Mahishasuravardhini (lit eight armed mother Goddess the slayer of demon Mahishasura), is svayambhu (self-manifested i.e. found in the ground). Other statues in the temple are of Kali (manifestation of Parvati), Shiva and his manifestation as Bhairava, family of Shiva (such a ganesha), Radha-Krishna, and Hanuman. The temple has an eternal flame which has been continuously burning at the temple for at least 400 years.

=== Rituals ===
Devotees tie a sacred thread in the temple to make wishes, and return to express gratitude when their wishes are fulfilled. People also perform the Mundan ceremony (head tonsuring ceremony) for their children here. Newly married couples visit the temple to seek the goddess's blessings. As per the tradition the priests are the Brahmacharya (celibate) from the Kaushik clan.

=== Festivals ===
The temple celebrates various festivals, specially the Navratri, and hosts fairs twice a year and bhandara (community kitchen) is organised, attracting large numbers of devotees.

== See also ==
- Tourism in Haryana
- Tourism in India
