= Warumbe =

Character responsible for death on Earth according to Buganda mythology

Warumbe or Walumbe is a character in the Ganda creation myth, the legend of Kintu. He is the son of Ggulu and the brother of Nambi. His name in the Luganda language means 'disease' or 'death' and he is responsible for death on Earth according to Gandan mythology.

== Legend ==
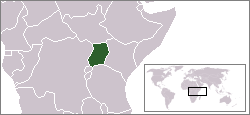
Location of Uganda

In the origin myth, Kintu, the first man, meets Nambi, the daughter of the heavenly deity Ggulu (also known as Mugulu). Upon learning of Kintu's existence, Ggulu orders his sons to steal Kintu's cow. Nambi is enraged by this and decides to bring Kintu to heaven. Kintu is then given many trials from Ggulu. After Kintu passes all of Ggulu's tests, Ggulu gives him his daughter among other gifts to take back to Earth. He gives them several vegetable plants, a hen, and some millet. He warns them then to hurry back to Earth to avoid gaining the attention of Nambi's brother Warumbe (also known as Walumbe) who he had sent away on an errand to prevent him from meeting Kintu. He specifically tells them not to come back for anything, but along the journey to earth Kintu and Nambi realize that they forgot to bring the millet. After much quarreling, one of them returns for the millet. While in heaven, Walumbe confronts Kintu and demands to accompany him to earth. After much deliberation, Kintu and Nambi allow Walumbe to accompany them to Earth.

In accordance with Gandan culture, Walumbe, as a brother of the bride, claimed one of Kintu's children as his own. Kintu refuses Walumbe's claims and continues to do so throughout the years. Frustrated, Walumbe then begins to kill a single child every day. After conversing with Ggulu, Kayikuuzi is sent to aid Kintu in sending Walumbe back to heaven. After refusing to accompany Kayikuuzi back to heaven, Walumbe retreats by hiding in craters in the ground that he creates by stomping his foot. This is said to have created the 240 Walumbe Tanda pits in the forest near Mityana; the pits now form an archaeological site and are also visited as shrines honouring the traditional beliefs. Kayikuuzi soon tires of pursuing Walumbe and asks all of mankind to be silent for two days to lure Walumbe out. When Walumbe finally emerges, Kintu's children cry out at the sight of him and he again retreats into the earth. Upon Kintu's dismissal, Kayikuuzi then returns to Ggulu and explains the situation. Upon hearing of this, Ggulu allows Walumbe to remain on Earth.

Walumbe is therefore blamed as the reason for death on Earth. Though every descendant of Kintu is eventually claimed by Walumbe, Kintu continues to fight Walumbe by constantly having more descendants than Walumbe can steal. This legend is acted out in Kyazze Tekizzikayo, a musical film directed and composed by Kaz Kasozi in 2007.

== Mpoobe meets Walumbe ==
The constant battle between Walumbe and Kintu's descendants is especially apparent in another Gandan story where a hunter named Mpoobe accidentally meets Walumbe.

While following his hunting dog through a large hole in the ground, Mpobe stumbles upon a village and eventually is met by Walumbe. After informing Mpoobe about his identity, Walumbe allows him to return after making him promise not to tell anyone about what he's seen. Mpoobe graciously accepts this deal, but later discloses the details of this accidental encounter to his mother. Walumbe learns of this and comes to claim Mpoobe's life. Mpoobe pleads a deal to first consume all of his possessions before dying, which Walumbe accepts. Mpoobe attempts to cheat death by prolonging this process over many years; however, his life is inevitably claimed by Walumbe.
