= Kaikuzi =

Character in the Gandan creation myth and the Legend of Kintu

Kaikuzi or Kayikuuzi is a character in the Gandan creation myth, The Legend of Kintu. He is the son of Ggulu. His name is translated as "the digger." He is responsible for attempting to rid the Earth of Walumbe, meaning "death" or "disease."

== The Legend ==
After Kintu succeeds in Ggulu's tests and returns to Earth with Nambi and Walumbe, he soon finds that in keeping with the Ganda tradition, Walumbe, as a brother of the bride, desires one of Kintu's children as his own. Kintu refuses Walumbe and continues to do so throughout the years. Frustrated, Walumbe, then begins to kill a single child every day. After conversing with Ggulu, Kaikuzi is sent to aid Kintu in returning Walumbe to heaven. Kaikuzi grapples with Walumbe, who then retreats by burrowing into the Earth. Kaikuzi pursues Walumbe, yet soon tires of the task. Kaikuzi then orders that there be two days of silence so as to lure Walumbe out. Kaikuzi then returns to his pursuit of Walumbe who finally emerges at a place called Tanda (located on the southside of the road to Mityana). At this place, children cry out at the sight of him and he again retreats into the earth. Kaikuzi then appears at Tanda and becomes frustrated upon hearing that the children broke the silence. Upon Kintu's dismissal, Kaikuzi returns to heaven and explains the situation to Ggulu. Upon hearing of this, Ggulu allows Walumbe, and thus death, to remain on Earth.
