= Bhramari =

Hindu goddess

- Goddess of Bees
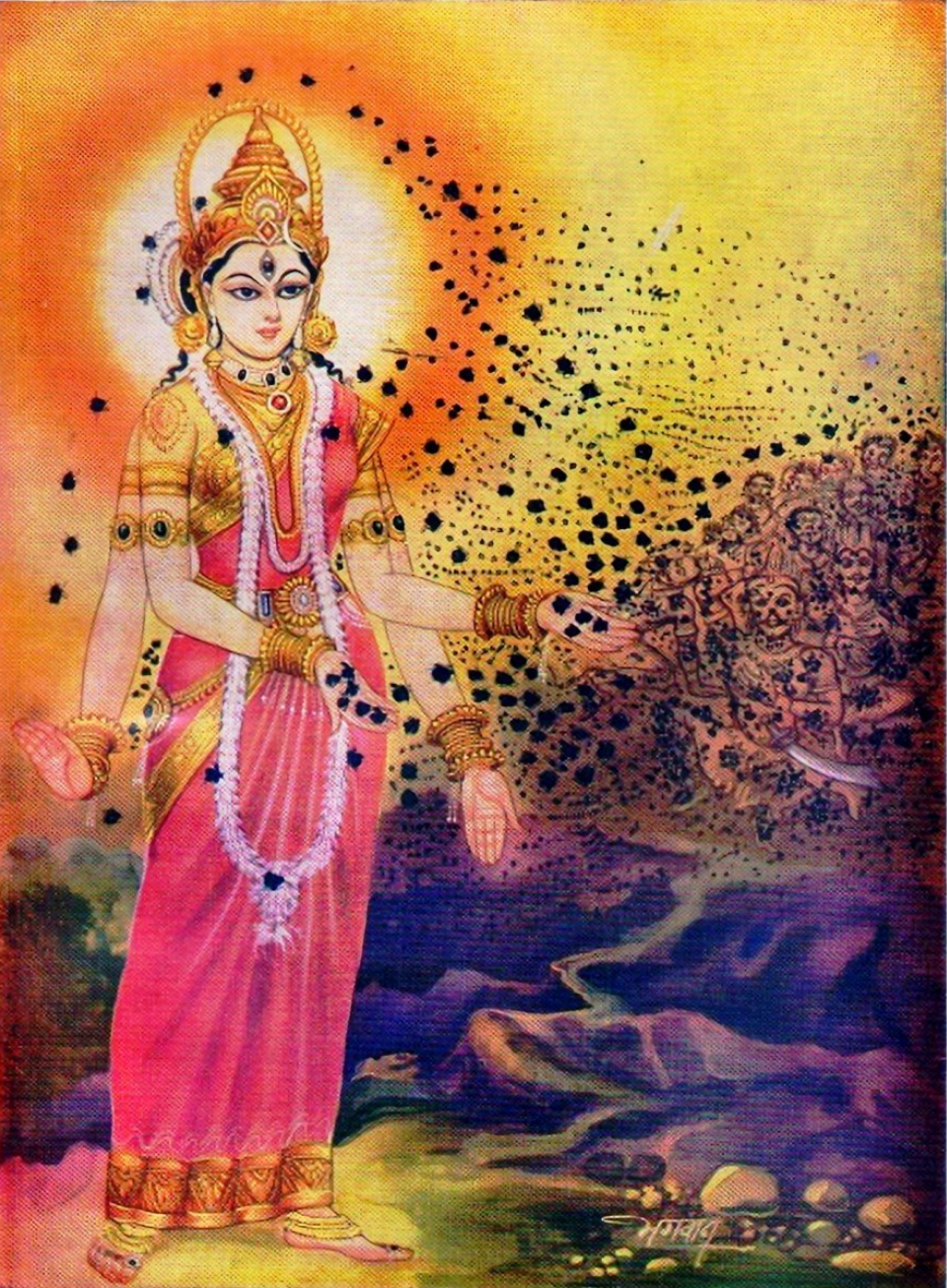
- Brahmari is seen releasing her army of black bees against the army of Arunasura
- Affiliation: Mahadevi, Parvati, Lakshmi

Bhramari (Sanskrit: भ्रामरी, romanized: Bhrāmarī, lit. 'like a bee') is the Hindu goddess of bees. She is an incarnation of the goddess Mahadevi in Shaktism. (Note: She is regarded to be a form of Lakshmi in the Pancharatra texts, while in Shaivism, she is also regarded to be a form of Parvati.)

== Etymology ==
Bhramari means 'the goddess of bees', or 'the goddess of black bees'.

== Iconography ==
The goddess is associated with bees, hornets, and wasps, which cling to her body, and is thus typically depicted as emanating bees and hornets from her four hands.

== Legend ==
The tenth book and thirteenth chapter of the Devi Bhagavata Purana records the exploits of the goddess Bhramari in detail:

In the city of the daityas, there lived a powerful asura named Aruna. He despised the devas, and sought above all else to conquer these deities. He went to the banks of the Ganges in the Himalayas, and practiced a very strict penance to Brahma, believing him to be the protector of the daityas.

Observing his penance and resolve, Brahma saw fit to bless Arunasura with the boon of not meeting his end at any war, nor by any arms or weapons, nor by any man or any woman, by any biped or quadruped creature, or any combination of the two. This blessing gave Arunasura the confidence to call on all the other daityas living in the nether regions and fight a final battle with the deities above. The daityas saluted him as their king. By his command, they sent messengers to Devaloka to signal their intent. Upon hearing the news, Indra trembled with fear, and went instantly with the deities to the abode of Brahma. After discussing the situation with Brahma, they went to the Vaikuntha to recruit Vishnu. There, they all held a conference on how to kill the daitya who sought to overthrow them.

While the deities conferred, Arunasura and his army invaded Devaloka. The daitya used the power of his penances to assume various forms and seized possession of the Chandra, Surya, Yama, Agni, and all the elemental deities. All these deities, dislodged from their stations, visited Kailasha, and presented to Shiva the dire nature of their situation. After conferring with Shiva, they turned to Adi Parashakti. The goddess was aware of Aruna's blessing, and devised a plan to kill the daitya with the help of six-legged creatures.

After taking control of all the celestial regions, Aruna's next intention was to attack Kailasha directly. Shiva and his sons confronted him at the foot of the mountain. They tried to defeat him, but were unsuccessful. Even Shiva was unable to defeat him. Adi Shakti then appeared behind Shiva, and grew to a massive size, emanating bees from her four hands. Her three eyes shone like the sun, the moon, and the eternal fire Agni. She closed her eyes in concentration, summoning forth countless bees, hornets, wasps, flies, termites, mosquitos and spiders from the skies. They crawled onto her body and clung onto her, merging with her to create the divine form of Bhramari.

In the battle that ensued, the daityas' swords were blocked by Bhramari's massive size, while her other arms inflicted damage on the massive army. The bees, hornets, wasps, flies, termites, mosquitos, and spiders, which clung to her emanated forth in a wave over the ranks. When Arunasura was the last daitya remaining on the battlefield, she retreated and sent out all of the insects to attack him. They crawled all over him and ripped open each part of his body: his chests, back and belly, arms, hands, fingers, legs, feet, and toes were all torn apart. Soon after seeing Arunasura's great fall, the insects returned to Bhramari and clung on her again. The deities, who were in awe of this new form, gave her great praise. On the successful decimation of the daitya forces, all of the devas were able to return to their celestial abodes.

== Literature ==
=== Devi Bhagavata Purana ===
The salutations offered to Bhramari in the Devi Bhagavata Purana indicate that she is a form of the goddess of prosperity, Lakshmi:

Obeisance to Thee! O Bhagavatī! It is Thou that didst appear as Lakṣmī out of the milk ocean (Kṣīra Samudra). Thou hadst destroyed Vritrāsura, Caṇḍa, Muṇḍa, Dhūmralocana, Rakta Bīja, Śumbha, Niśumbha and the Exterminator of the Dānavas and thus, Thou didst do great favours to the Devas.

— Devi Bhagavata Purana, Book 10, Chapter 13

=== Marakandeya Purana ===
She is also briefly alluded to in the Devi Mahatmya.

=== Lakshmi Tantra ===
Lakshmi declares herself to be Bhramari in the Lakshmi Tantra:

“During the sixtieth era there will be one demon, called Aruṇa who will do much harm to men and sages. Then I shall appear in bee-form incorporating innumerable bees, and I shall slay the mighty demon and rescue the three worlds. From then on people will praise me for ever and address me as Bhrāmarī.”

— Lakshmi Tantra, 9.41-43

== Yoga ==
In pranayama, the name Bhramari is given to a type of breathing through the nose, making a smooth humming sound like a bee buzzing.

== Worship ==
The goddess is worshipped as Bhramaramba together with Shiva at the following temples:

- Andhra Pradesh state
  - Mallikarjuna Temple at Srisailam in Nandyal district, one of the twelve Jyotirlingas temples and one of main 18 Shakta pithas.
- Karnataka state
  - Bhramari Sri Durga Parameshwari temple at Kateel in Dakshina Kannada district of the Indian state of Karnataka.
- Haryana state
  - Shri Durga Mata Bhramari Mandir at Banbhori village of Hisar district where fairs are held twice a year and an eternal flame which has been continuously burning at the temple for at least 400 years.

== See also ==
- Ah-Muzen-Cab -- Mayan god of bees.
- Aristaeus -- Ancient Greek god of bees.
- Austėja -- Lithuanian goddess of bees.
- Bubilas -- Lithuanian god of bees.
- Colel Cab -- Mayan goddess of bees.
- Melissa -- Ancient Greek/Minoan goddess of bees.
- Mellona -- Roman goddess of bees.
- Bee (mythology)
