= Insects in religion =

Interpretations and traditional meanings of insects among religions

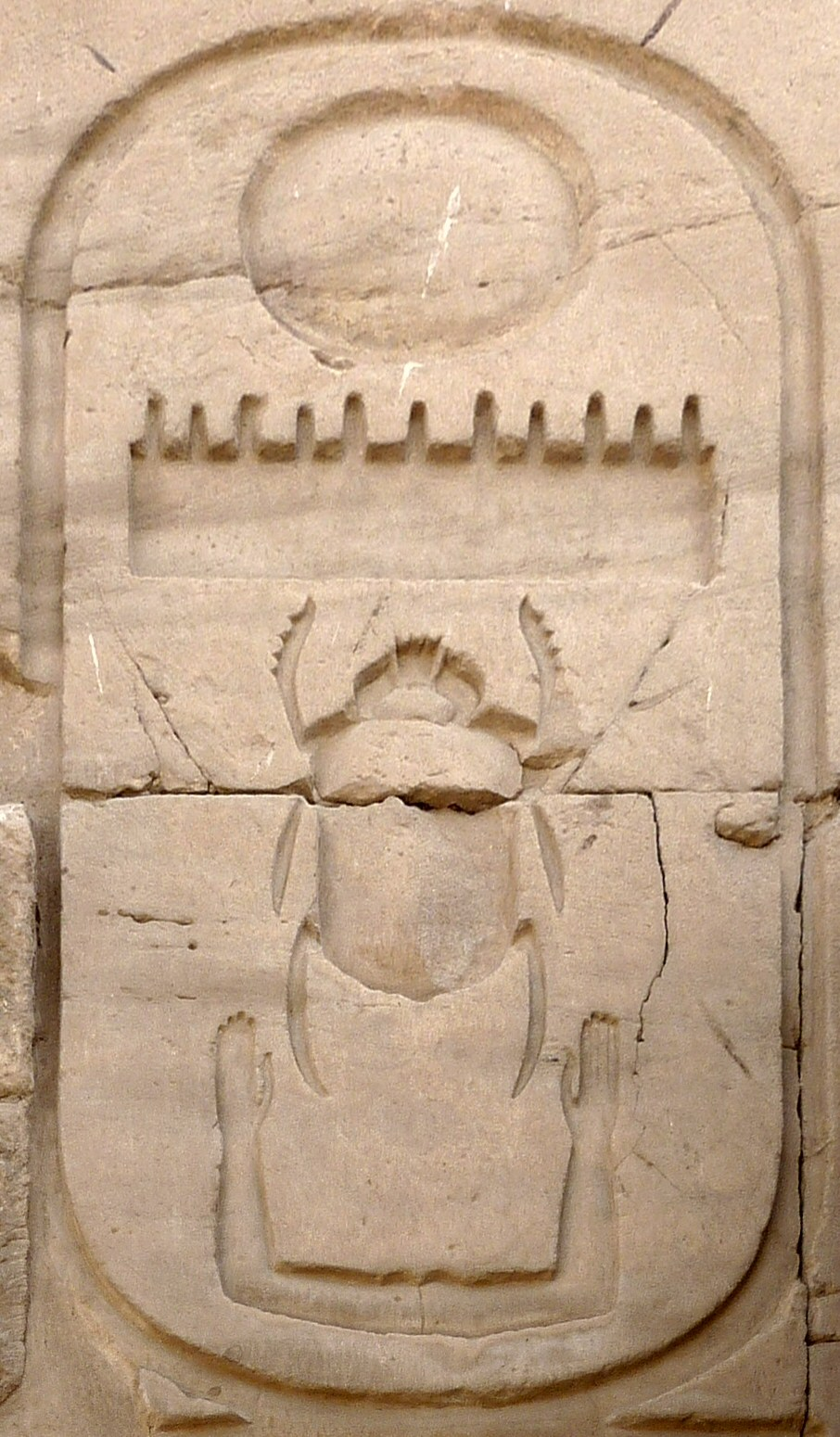
Sacred scarab in a cartouche of Thutmosis III from Karnak temple of Amun-Ra, Egypt

Insects have long been used in religion, both directly (with live insects) and as images or symbols.

== Live insects in religious ceremonies ==
In the Brazilian Amazon, members of the Tupí–Guaraní language family have been observed using Pachycondyla commutata ants during female rite-of-passage ceremonies, and prescribing the sting of Pseudomyrmex spp. for fevers and headaches.

Pogonomyrmex californicus, a red harvester ant, has been widely used by natives of Southern California and Northern Mexico for hundreds of years in ceremonies conducted to help tribe members acquire spirit helpers through hallucination. During the ritual, young men are sent away from the tribe and consume large quantities of live, unmasticated ants under the supervision of an elderly member of the tribe. Ingestion of ants should lead to a prolonged state of unconsciousness where dream helpers appear and serve as allies to the dreamer for the rest of his life.

== Insect symbols ==
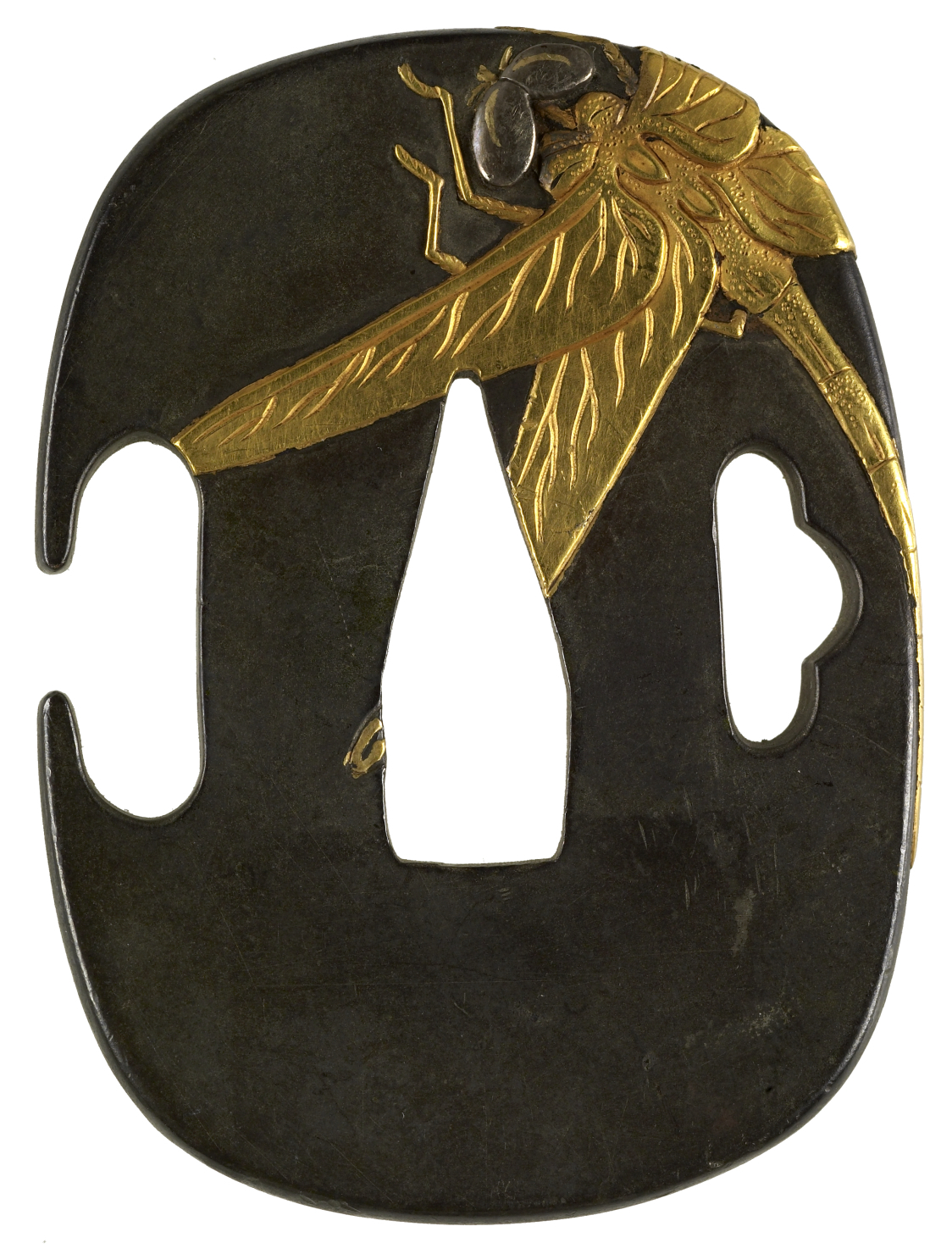
Japanese tsuba with a dragonfly, 1931

In Ancient Egyptian religion, the dung beetle now known as Scarabaeus sacer (formerly Ateuchus sacer) was revered as sacred, as Charles Darwin noted in On the Origin of Species, describing the genus Ateuchus as the "sacred beetle of the Egyptians." To them, the insect was a symbol of Khepri, the early morning manifestation of the sun god Ra, from an analogy between the beetle's behaviour of rolling a ball of dung across the ground and Khepri's task of rolling the sun across the sky. They accordingly held the species to be sacred. The Egyptians also observed young beetles emerging from the ball of dung, from which they mistakenly inferred that the female beetle was able to reproduce without needing a male. From this, they drew parallels with their god Atum, who also begat children alone.

In the Shinto of Japan, dragonflies are mentioned in haiku poems, for example behaving as if on pilgrimage, or gathering in the Bon festival of the dead.

In the Quran, the honeybee is the only creature that speaks directly to God. It is written in the Quran in chapter 16, in the 68-69 verses:

And your Lord taught the honey bee to build its cells in hills, on trees, and in (men's) habitations; Then to eat of all the produce (of the earth), and find with skill the spacious paths of its Lord: there issues from within their bodies a drink of varying colours, wherein is healing for men: verily in this is a Sign for those who give thought. (Surat an-Nahl (The Bee), 68-69)
