= Kintu =

Ugandan mythological figure

- Born: Buganda

Kintu is a mythological figure who appears in a creation myth of the people of Buganda, Uganda. According to this legend, Kintu was the first person on earth, and the first Muganda.

Kintu, meaning "thing" in Bantu languages, is also commonly attached to the name Muntu, the legendary figure who founded the Gisu and Bukusu tribes.

== Background and cultural significance ==
The creation myth of the people of Buganda, Uganda, includes a figure called Kintu, who was the first person on earth, and the first man to wander the plains of Uganda alone. He has also sometimes been known as God, or the father of all people who created the first kingdoms.

The name Kintu, meaning 'thing' in Bantu, is commonly attached to the name Muntu, who was the legendary figure who founded the Gisu and Bukusu tribes. Kintu is believed to originate from the east, west, and north, who brought with him the first materials to begin life on earth. These materials were millet, cattle or call it Ente in Luganda language, and bananas.

== Narrative ==
In the version of the creation myth recorded by Harry Johnston, Kintu appears on the plains of Uganda with a cow which was his only possession. He fed on its milk and cow dung before being rewarded bananas and millet from the sky god, Ggulu. Before his encounter with Ggulu, Kintu meets a woman named Nambi (sometimes rendered Nnambi) and her sister who had come from the sky. They first take his beloved cow to Ggulu to prove his humanness and to seek Ggulu's permission to admit him into the sky.

Once arriving in the sky, Kintu's humanness is tested by Ggulu through five consecutive trials, each one trickier and more difficult than the last. However, Kintu is able to come out of each trial victorious with the assistance of an unidentified divine power. Ggulu is impressed with Kintu's wit and resilience, rewarding his efforts with his daughter Nnambi and many agricultural gifts as dowry which included: bananas, potatoes, beans, maize corn, groundnuts, and a hen. From this point, Kintu was given the basic materials to be able to create life in Uganda.

However, before leaving the sky, Kintu and Nnambi were warned by Ggulu not to come back for any reason as they made their journey back to Earth for fear that Nnambi's brother, Walumbe (meaning 'disease' and 'death' in Bantu), would follow them back to Earth and cause them great trouble. Kintu and Nnambi disregarded Ggulu's warning and Kintu returned to the sky to fetch the millet the hen had to feed on while on earth that Nnambi had left behind. In his short time there, Walumbe had figured Nnambi's whereabouts and convinced Kintu to allow him to live with them on Earth. Upon seeing Walumbe accompanying Kintu on their way down from the sky, Nnambi at first denied her brother but Walumbe eventually persuaded her into allowing him to stay with them.

The three of them first settled in Magongo in Buganda where they rested and planted the first crops on earth: banana, maize corn, beans, and groundnuts. During this time, Kintu and Nnambi had three children, and Walumbe insisted on claiming one as his own. Kintu denied his request, promising him one of his future children; however, Kintu and Nnambi proceeded to have many more children and denied Walumbe with each child causing him to lash out and declare that he would kill each and every one of Kintu's children and claim them in that sense.

Each day for three days, one of Kintu's children died by the hands of Walumbe until Kintu returned to the sky and told Ggulu of the killings. Ggulu expected the actions of Walumbe and sent Kayiikuuzi (meaning 'digger' in Bantu), his son, to Earth to attempt to capture and bring Walumbe back to the sky. Kintu and Kayiikuuzi descended to Earth and were notified by Nnambi that a few more of their children had died during Kintu's trip to the sky. In response to this, Kayiikuuzi called upon Walumbe and the two met and fought.

During the fight, Walumbe was able to slip away into a hole in the ground and continued to dig deeper as Kayiikuuzi tried to retrieve him. These gigantic holes are believed to be in the present day Tanda. After relentlessly digging, Kayiikuuzi tired out and took a break from chasing Walumbe. Kayiikuuzi remained on earth for two more days and ordered silence among all things on Earth during that time (before sunrise) in an attempt to lure Walumbe out of the ground. However, just as Walumbe started to get curious and came out from under the ground, some of Kintu's children spotted him and screamed out, scaring Walumbe back into the Earth.

Tired and frustrated with his wasted efforts and broken orders, Kayiikuuzi returned to the sky without capturing Walumbe, who stayed on earth and is responsible for the misery and suffering of Kintu's children today. However, Kayiikuuzi is still chasing Walumbe and every time earthquakes and tsunamis strike, it is Kayiikuuzi almost catching Walumbe.

== Variations ==
=== Roscoe and Kaggwa ===
In the early 1900s, two similar oral traditions of the Kintu creation myth were recorded and published. One oral tradition recorded by John Roscoe differs from other versions in that Kintu was said to have been seduced by Nnambi into going with her to the sky. In addition, after completing the trials Ggulu tasked him with, he was given permission to marry Nnambi and returned to Uganda with various livestock and one plantation stalk to begin life on Earth. Furthermore, in this version Kintu was the one to try to capture Walumbe, not Kayiikuuzi.

The other oral tradition recorded by Sir Apolo Kaggwa differed from other Kintu creation myths in that it focused more on the contributions that Kintu had on the political aspects of Buganda. According to this oral tradition, Kintu formed the political and geographical foundations of the nation by setting the physical boundaries of the nation, founding the capital, and creating the first form of politics in Baganda society through royal hierarchy.

=== Kizza ===
Kintu is also presented in Kizza's 2011 The Oral Tradition of Baganda of Uganda. In this version of the Kintu creation myth, the importance of the story is placed upon Nambi; in the beginning of the myth, it is Nambi who falls in love with Kintu upon their first meeting in Baganda and convinces Kintu to seek approval from her father in order to get her hand in marriage. For this reason, Kintu's worthiness was tested by Nambi's father Ggulu through a series of trials over the course of four days. From this point, this version of the oral tradition differs from others in that Ggulu instructed Nambi to take one female and one male of each living thing in order to begin life on Earth. Ggulu also warned her not to forget anything while packing because she would never be able to return to the sky in fear that her mischievous brother Walumbe would follow them to Earth and bring hardships upon them.
