= Ggulu =

Translation for heaven in Luganda

Ggulu is a translation for heaven in the Bantu language Luganda.

== The legend ==
In the legend, two of Ggulu's daughters discover Kintu, the first human being according to Gandan myth. When Kintu declines to follow the daughters to heaven, they tell Ggulu who promptly tells his son to steal Kintu's cow, his only source of nutrition. When Kintu is brought to heaven by Nambi, Ggulu's daughter, Ggulu tests him by ordering Kintu to eat ten thousand meals to prove that he is a man. Kintu secretly disposes of the food into a hidden cavern and Ggulu tests him yet again. When Kintu succeeds in the second test of cutting stones through the use of a magical bronze axe, Ggulu orders Kintu to fetch him a bucket of dew to drink. Kintu is able to do this as the bucket itself has magical powers. Ggulu then tests Kintu one final time by herding three herds of ten thousand of cows before him. Kintu's job is to retrieve his cow and when the third herd is driven by, a magic hornet aids him in identifying his cow and two calves born while in captivity.

Upon passing all of Ggulu's tests, Ggulu gives Kintu his daughter, Nambi, to take back to Earth. He also gives them multiple vegetable plants, a hen, and some millet. He warns them then to hurry back to Earth to avoid gaining the attention of Walumbe (meaning "disease or death"), Nambi's brother. He tells them not to come back for anything, but when Kintu forgets the hen's millet, he returns for it. Upon Kintu's return, Walumbe discovers the situation and confronts Kintu and Nambi. After much deliberation, Kintu and Nambi allow Walumbe to stay with them on Earth for a time. When Walumbe begins killing children on Earth, Kintu returns to Ggulu. Ggulu sends his son, Kayiikuuzi, to aid in ridding Earth of Walumbe. Finally, when humans ruin Kayiikuuzi's plan for capturing Walumbe, Kayiikuuzi returns to heaven and Ggulu allows Walumbe to remain on Earth.
