= Human interactions with insects =

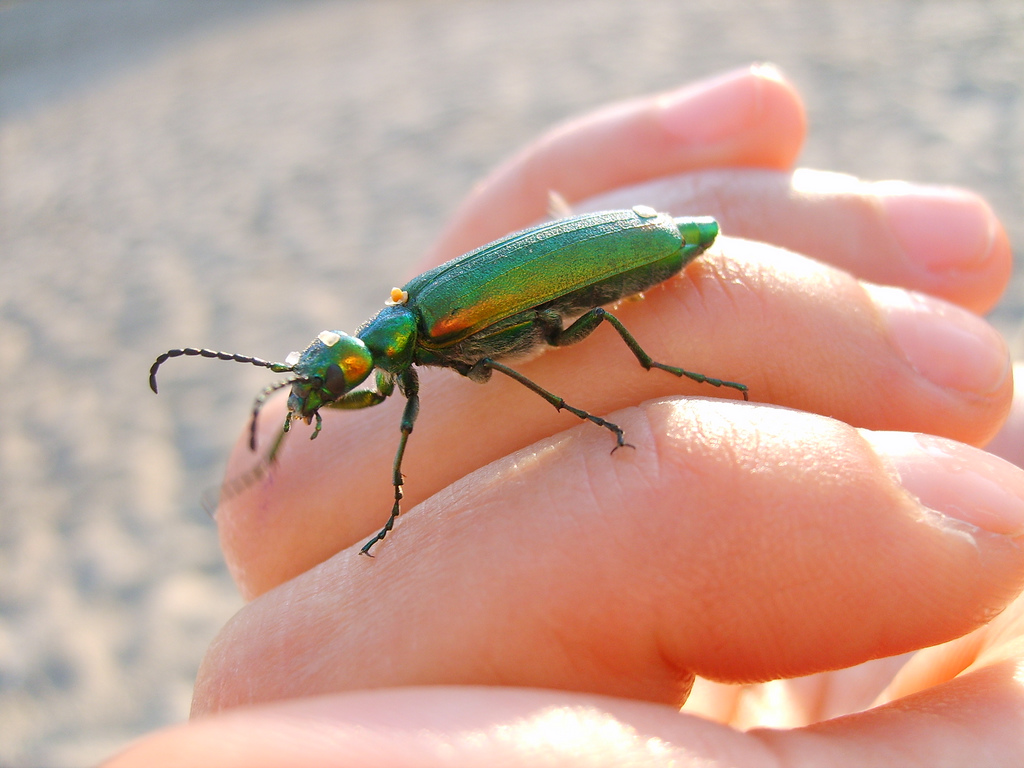
The "Spanish fly", Lytta vesicatoria, has been considered to have medicinal, aphrodisiac, and other properties.

Human interactions with insects include both a wide variety of uses, whether practical such as for food, textiles (especially silk), and dyestuffs, or symbolic, as in art, music, and literature, and negative interactions including damage to crops and extensive efforts to control insect pests.

Academically, the interaction of insects and society has been treated in part as cultural entomology, dealing mostly with "advanced" societies, and in part as ethnoentomology, dealing mostly with "primitive" societies, though the distinction is weak and not based on theory. Both academic disciplines explore the parallels, connections and influence of insects on human populations, and vice versa. They are rooted in anthropology and natural history, as well as entomology, the study of insects. Other cultural uses of insects, such as biomimicry, do not necessarily lie within these academic disciplines.

More generally, people make a wide range of uses of insects, both practical and symbolic. On the other hand, attitudes to insects are often negative, and extensive efforts are made to kill them. The widespread use of insecticides has failed to exterminate any insect pest, but has caused resistance to commonly used chemicals in a thousand insect species.

Practical uses include as food, in medicine, for the valuable textile silk, for dyestuffs such as carmine, in science, where the fruit fly is an important model organism in genetics, and in warfare, where insects were successfully used in the Second World War to spread disease in enemy populations. One insect, the honey bee, provides honey, pollen, royal jelly, propolis and an anti-inflammatory peptide, melittin; its larvae too are eaten in some societies. Medical uses of insects include maggot therapy for wound debridement. Over a thousand protein families have been identified in the saliva of blood-feeding insects; these may provide useful drugs such as anticoagulants, vasodilators, antihistamines and anaesthetics.

Symbolic uses include roles in art, in music (with many songs featuring insects), in film, in literature, in religion, and in mythology. Insect costumes are used in theatrical productions and worn for parties and carnivals.

== Cultural entomology and ethnoentomology ==
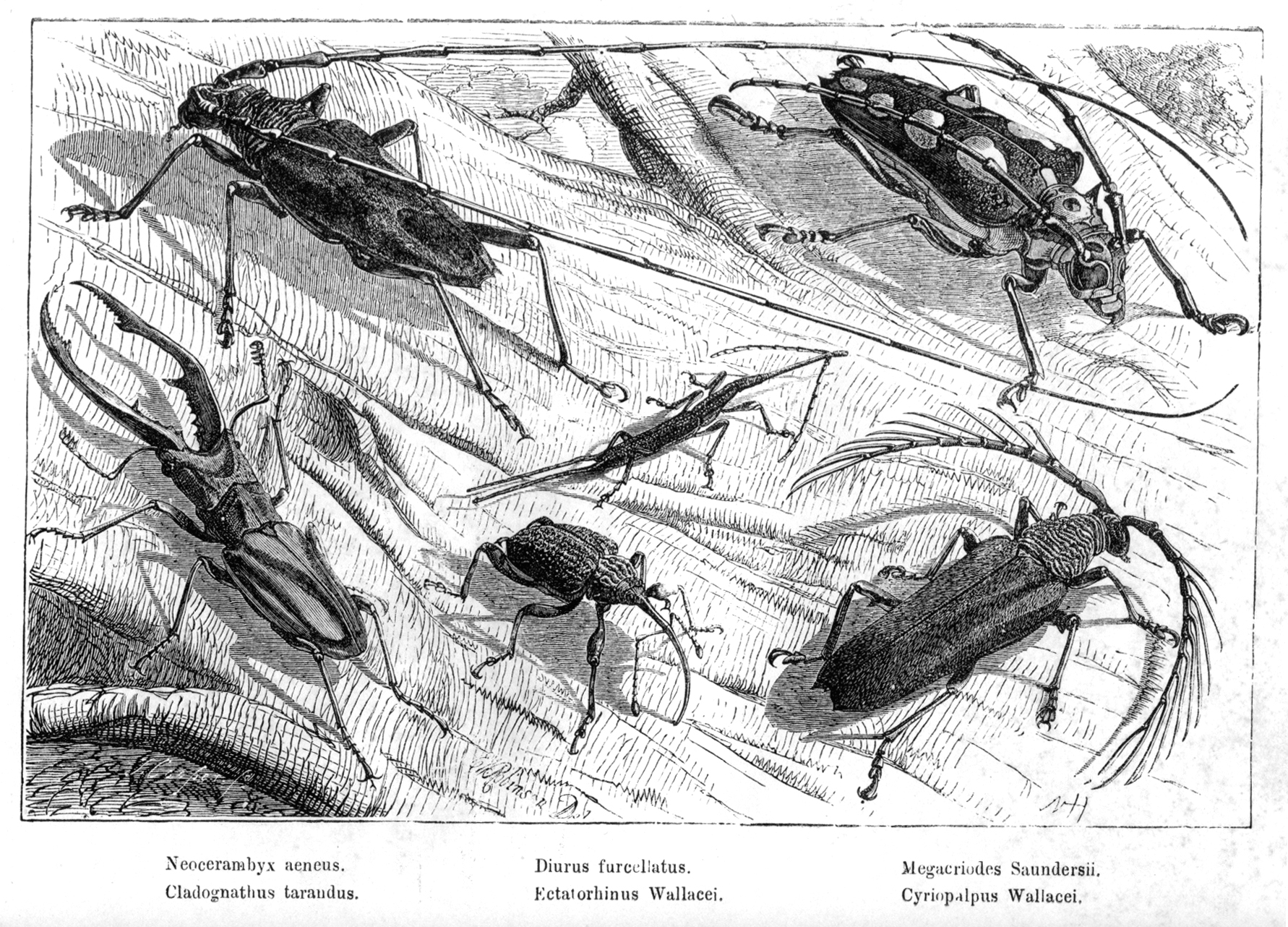
"Remarkable Beetles Found at Simunjon, Borneo": Alfred Russel Wallace was a pioneer of ethnoentomology.

Ethnoentomology developed from the 19th century with early works by authors such as Alfred Russel Wallace (1852) and Henry Walter Bates (1862). Hans Zinsser's classic Rats, Lice and History (1935) showed that insects were an important force in human history. Writers like William Morton Wheeler, Maurice Maeterlinck, and Jean Henri Fabre described insect life and communicated their meaning to people "with imagination and brilliance". Frederick Simon Bodenheimer's Insects as Human Food (1951) drew attention to the scope and potential of entomophagy, and showed a positive aspect of insects. Food is the most studied topic in ethnoentomology, followed by medicine and beekeeping.

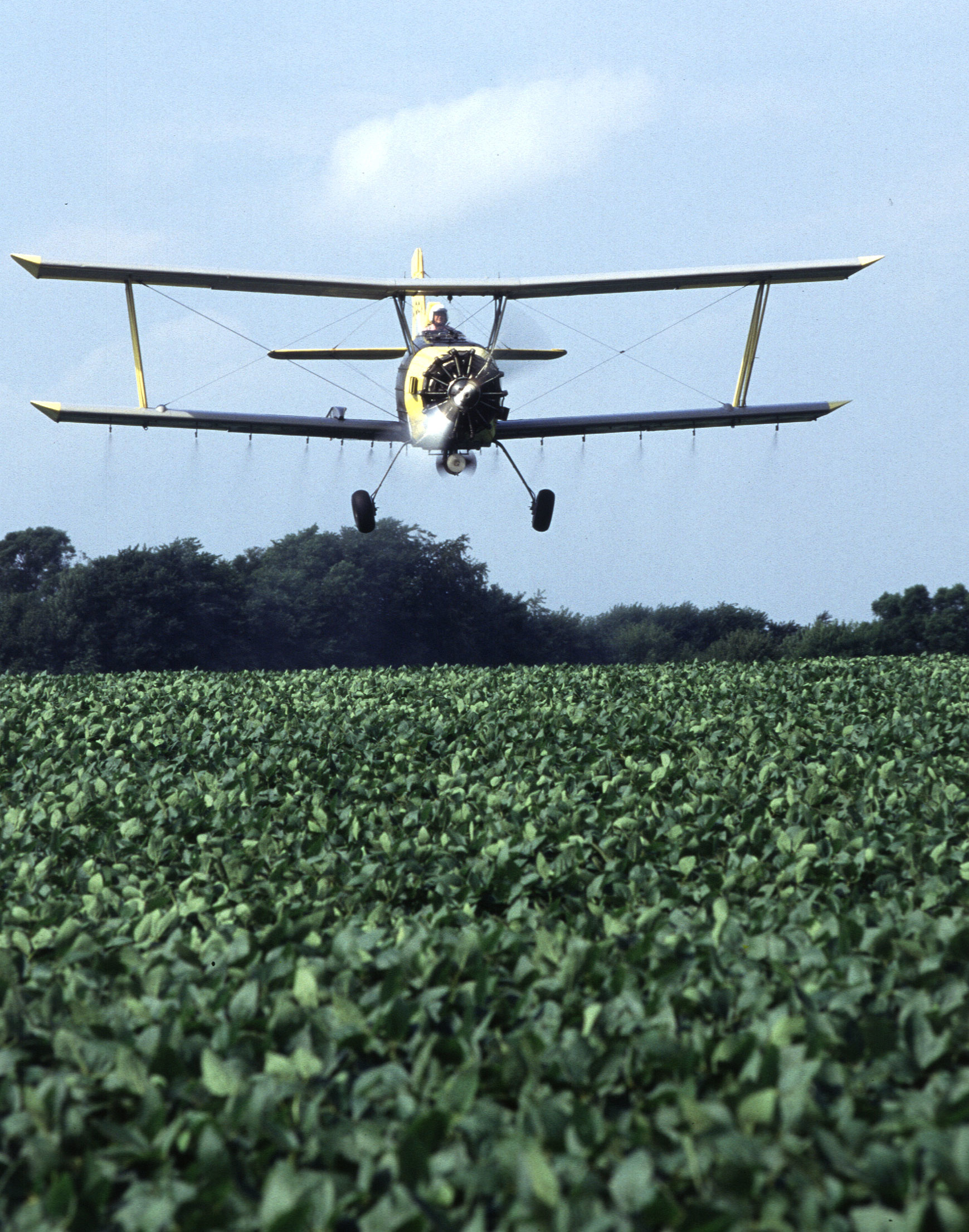
Fighting insects: an agricultural aircraft applies low-insecticide bait to kill western corn rootworms.

In 1968, Erwin Schimitschek claimed cultural entomology as a branch of insect studies, in a review of the roles insects played in folklore and culture including religion, food, medicine and the arts. In 1984, Charles Hogue covered the field in English and from 1994 to 1997, Hogue's The Cultural Entomology Digest served as a forum on the field. Hogue argued that "Humans spend their intellectual energies in three basic areas of activity: surviving, using practical learning (the application of technology); seeking pure knowledge through inductive mental processes (science); and pursuing enlightenment to taste a pleasure by aesthetic exercises that may be referred to as the 'humanities.' Entomology has long been concerned with survival (economic entomology) and scientific study (academic entomology), but the branch of investigation that addresses the influence of insects (and other terrestrial Arthropoda, including arachnids and myriapods) in literature, language, music, the arts, interpretive history, religion, and recreation has only become recognized as a distinct field" through Schimitschek's work. Hogue set out the boundaries of the field by saying: "The narrative history of the science of entomology is not part of cultural entomology, while the influence of insects on general history would be considered cultural entomology." He added: "Because the term "cultural" is narrowly defined, some aspects normally included in studies of human societies are excluded."

Darrell Addison Posey, noting that the boundary between cultural entomology and ethnoentomology is difficult to draw, cites Hogue as limiting cultural entomology to the influence of insects on "the essence of humanity as expressed in the arts and humanities". Posey notes further that cultural anthropology is usually restricted to the study of "advanced", industrialised, and literate societies, whereas ethnoentomology studies "the entomological concerns of 'primitive' or 'noncivilized' societies". Posey states at once that the division is artificial, complete with an unjustified us/them bias. Brian Morris similarly criticises the way that anthropologists treat non-Western attitudes to nature as monadic and spiritualist, and contrast this "in gnostic fashion" with a simplistic treatment of Western, often 17th-century, mechanistic attitude. Morris considers this "quite unhelpful, if not misleading", and offers instead his own research into the multiple ways that the people of Malawi relate to insects and other animals: "pragmatic, intellectual, realist, practical, aesthetic, symbolic and sacramental."

== Benefits and costs ==
=== Insect ecosystem services ===
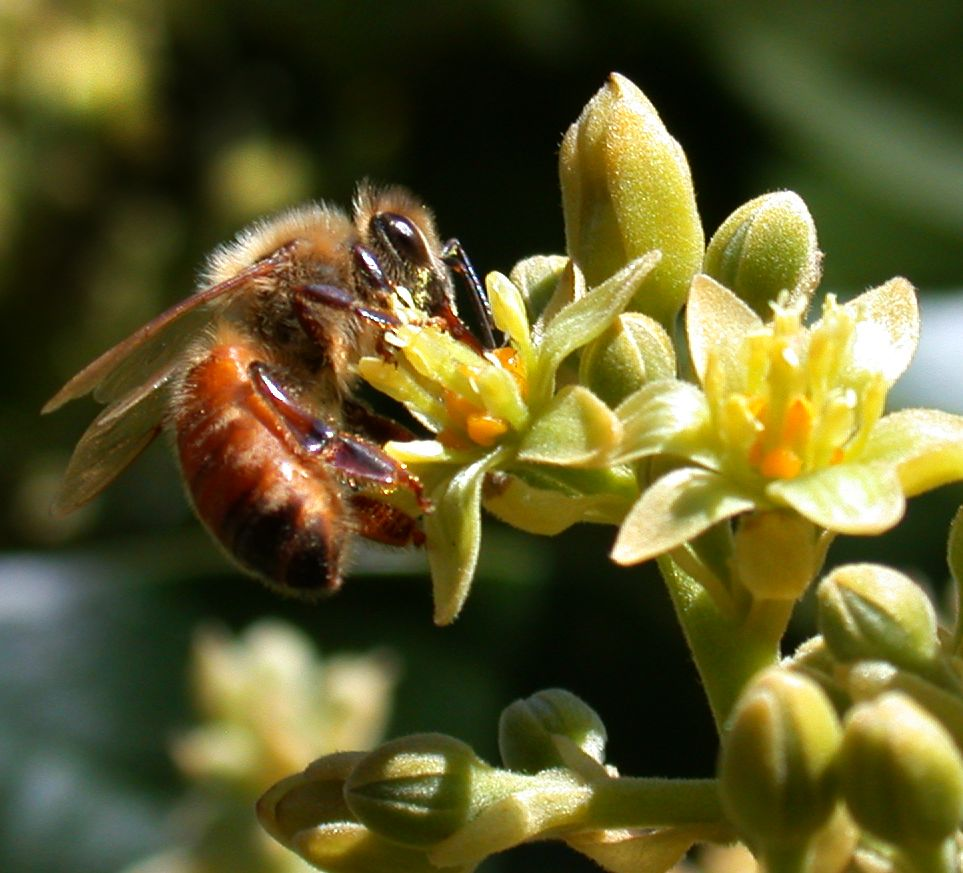
Pollination, here by a bee on an avocado crop, is an ecosystem service.

The Millennium Ecosystem Assessment (MEA) report 2005 defines ecosystem services as benefits people obtain from ecosystems, and distinguishes four categories, namely provisioning, regulating, supporting, and cultural. A fundamental tenet is that a few species of arthropod are well understood for their influence on humans (such as honeybees, ants, mosquitoes, and spiders). However, insects offer ecological goods and services. The Xerces Society calculates the economic impact of four ecological services rendered by insects: pollination, recreation (i.e. "the importance of bugs to hunting, fishing, and wildlife observation, including bird-watching"), dung burial, and pest control. The value has been estimated at $153 billion worldwide. As the ant expert E. O. Wilson observed: "If all mankind were to disappear, the world would regenerate back to the rich state of equilibrium that existed ten thousand years ago. If insects were to vanish, the environment would collapse into chaos." A Nova segment on the American Public Broadcasting Service framed the relationship with insects in an urban context: "We humans like to think that we run the world. But even in the heart of our great cities, a rival superpower thrives ... These tiny creatures live all around us in vast numbers, though we hardly even notice them. But in many ways, it is they who really run the show. The Washington Post stated: "We are flying blind in many aspects of preserving the environment, and that's why we are so surprised when a species like the honeybee starts to crash, or an insect we don't want, the Asian tiger mosquito or the fire ant, appears in our midst. In other words: Start thinking about the bugs."

=== Pests and propaganda ===
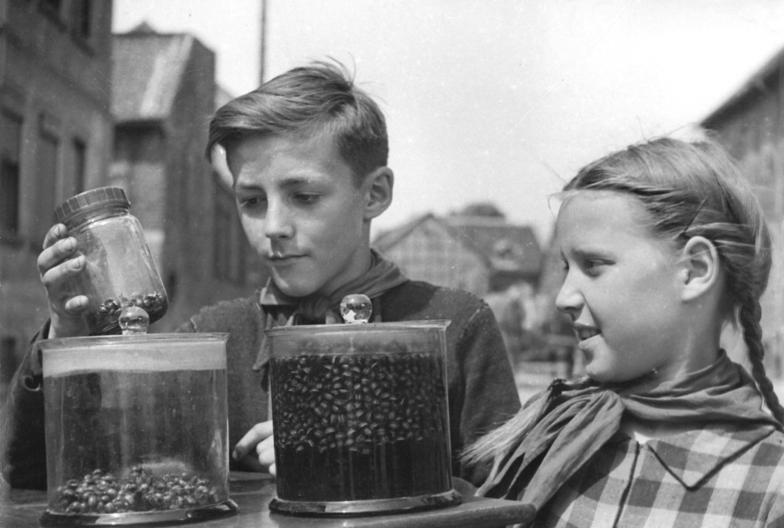
In the war against the potato beetle, East German Young Pioneers were urged to collect and kill Colorado beetles.

Human attitudes toward insects are often negative, reinforced by sensationalism in the media. This has produced a society that attempts to eliminate insects from daily life. For example, nearly 75 million pounds of broad-spectrum insecticides are manufactured and sold each year for use in American homes and gardens. Annual revenues from insecticide sales to homeowners exceeded $450 million in 2004. Out of the roughly a million species of insects described so far, not more than 1,000 can be regarded as serious pests, and less than 10,000 (about 1%) are even occasional pests. Yet not one species of insect has been permanently eradicated through the use of pesticides. Instead, at least 1,000 species have developed field resistance to pesticides, and extensive harm has been done to beneficial insects including pollinators such as bees.

During the Cold War, the Warsaw Pact countries launched a widespread war against the potato beetle, blaming the introduction of the species from America on the CIA, demonising the species in propaganda posters, and urging children to gather the beetles and kill them.

== Practical uses ==
=== As food ===
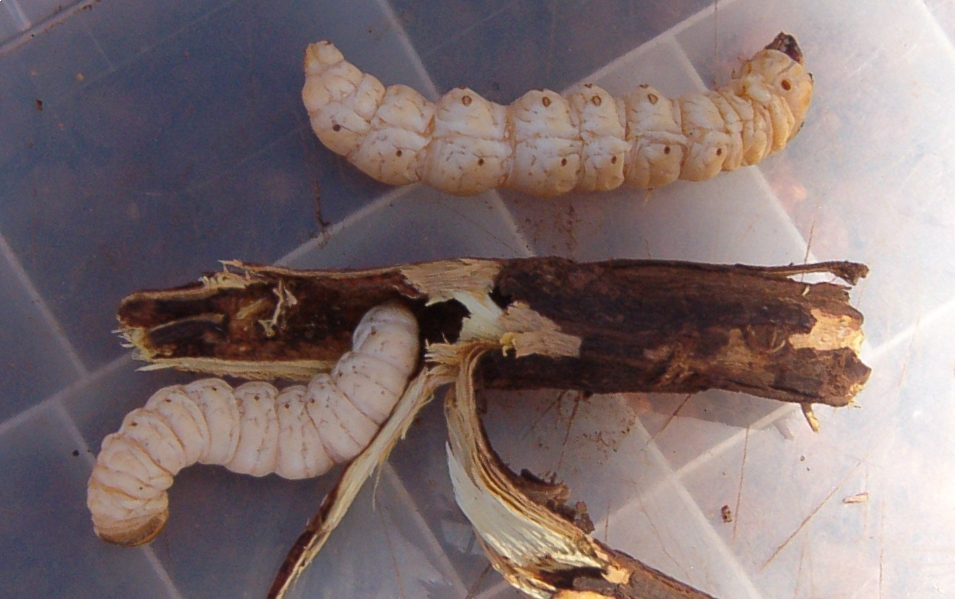
Witchetty grubs were prized as food by the Arrernte people of Australia

Entomophagy is the eating of insects. Many edible insects are considered a culinary delicacy in some societies around the world, and Frederick Simon Bodenheimer's Insects as Human Food (1951) drew attention to the scope and potential of entomophagy, but the practice is uncommon and even taboo in other societies. Sometimes insects are considered suitable only for the poor in the third world, but in 1975 Victor Meyer-Rochow suggested that insects could help ease global future food shortages and advocated a change in western attitudes towards cultures in which insects were appreciated as a food item. P. J. Gullan and P. S. Cranston felt that the remedy for this may be marketing of insect dishes as suitably exotic and costly to make them acceptable. They also note that some societies in sub-Saharan Africa prefer caterpillars to beef, while Chakravorty et al. (2011) point out that food insects (highly appreciated in North-East India) are more expensive than meat. The economics, i.e., the costs involved collecting food insects and the money earned through the sale of such insects, have been studied in a Laotian setting by Meyer-Rochow et al. (2008). In Mexico, ant larvae and corixid water boatman eggs are sought out as a form of caviar by gastronomes. In Guangdong, water beetles fetch a high enough price for these insects to be farmed. Especially high prices are fetched in Thailand for the giant water bug Lethocerus indicus.

Insects used in food include honey bee larvae and pupae, mopani worms, silkworms, Maguey worms, Witchetty grubs, crickets, grasshoppers and locusts. In Thailand, there are 20,000 farmers rearing crickets, producing some 7,500 tons per year.

=== In medicine ===
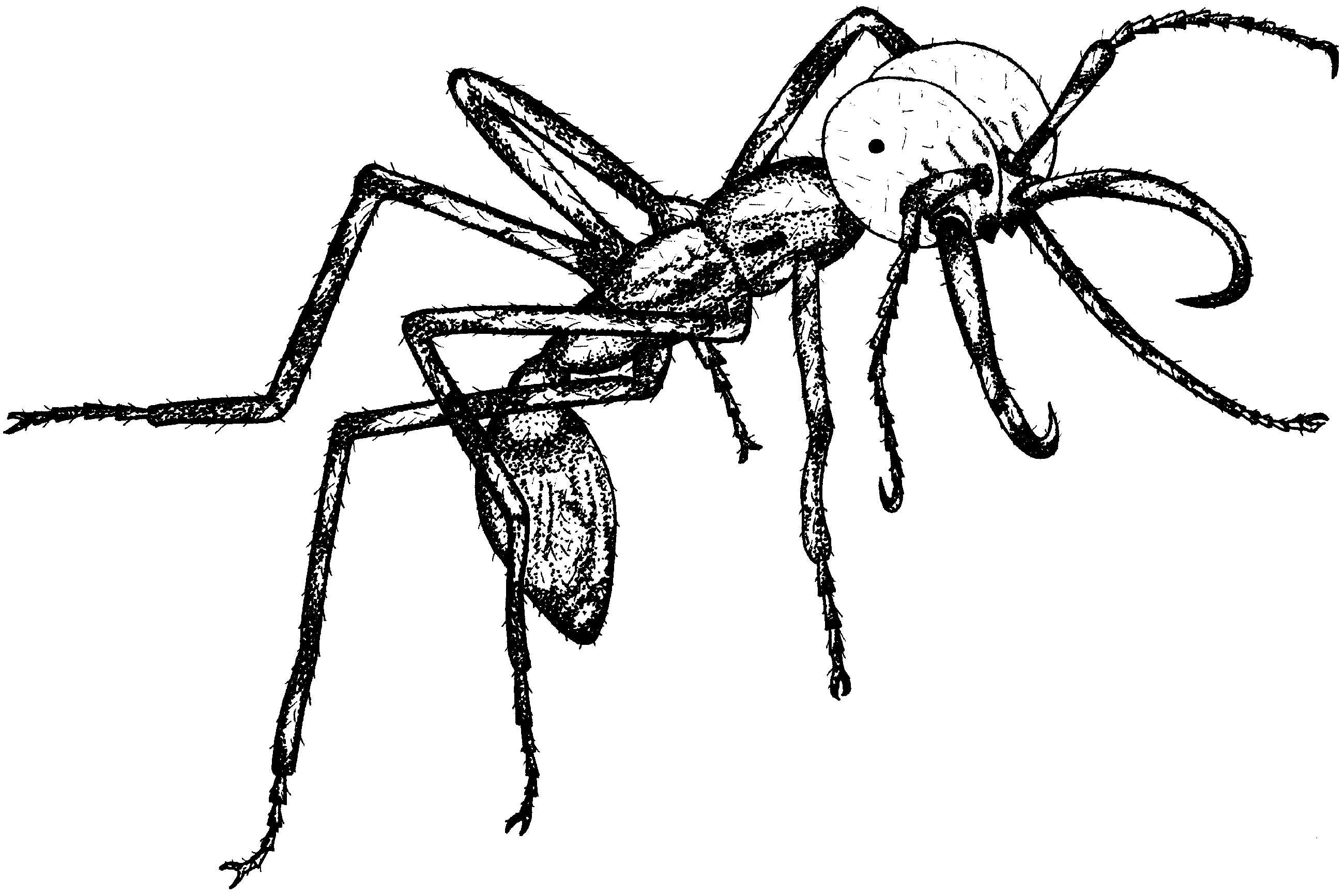
Eciton burchellii army ants were used by the Mayans as living sutures, their powerful jaws holding a wound closed.

Insects have been used medicinally in cultures around the world, often according to the Doctrine of Signatures. Thus, the femurs of grasshoppers, which were said to resemble the human liver, were used to treat liver ailments by the indigenous peoples of Mexico. The doctrine was applied in both Traditional Chinese Medicine (TCM) and in Ayurveda. TCM uses arthropods for various purposes; for example, centipede is used to treat tetanus, seizures, and convulsions, while the Chinese Black Mountain Ant, Polyrhachis vicina, is used as a cure all, especially by the elderly, and extracts have been examined as a possible anti-cancer agent. Ayurveda uses insects such as Termite for conditions such as ulcers, rheumatic diseases, anaemia, and pain. The Jatropha leaf miner's larvae are used boiled to induce lactation, reduce fever, and soothe the gastrointestinal tract. In contrast, the traditional insect medicine of Africa is local and unformalised. The indigenous peoples of Central America used a wide variety of insects medicinally. Mayans used Army ant soldiers as living sutures. The venom of the Red harvester ant was used to cure rheumatism, arthritis, and poliomyelitis via the immune reaction produced by its sting. Boiled silkworm pupae were taken to treat apoplexy, aphasy, bronchitis, pneumonia, convulsions, haemorrhages, and frequent urination.

Honey bee products are used medicinally in apitherapy across Asia, Europe, Africa, Australia, and the Americas, despite the fact that the honey bee was not introduced to the Americas until the colonization by Spain and Portugal. They are by far the most common medical insect product both historically and currently, and the most frequently referenced of these is honey. It can be applied to skin to treat excessive scar tissue, rashes, and burns, and as an eye poultice to treat infection. Honey is taken for digestive problems and as a general health restorative. It is taken hot to treat colds, cough, throat infections, laryngitis, tuberculosis, and lung diseases. Apitoxin (honey bee venom) is applied via direct stings to relieve arthritis, rheumatism, polyneuritis, and asthma. Propolis, a resinous, waxy mixture collected by honeybees and used as a hive insulator and sealant, is often consumed by menopausal women because of its high hormone content, and it is said to have antibiotic, anesthetic, and anti-inflammatory properties. Royal jelly is used to treat anaemia, gastrointestinal ulcers, arteriosclerosis, hypo- and hypertension, and inhibition of sexual libido. Finally bee bread, or bee pollen, is eaten as a generally health restorative, and is said to help treat both internal and external infections. One of the major peptides in bee venom, melittin, has the potential to treat inflammation in sufferers of rheumatoid arthritis and multiple sclerosis.

The rise of antibiotic resistant infections has sparked pharmaceutical research for new resources, including into arthropods.

Maggot therapy uses blowfly larvae to perform wound-cleaning debridement.

Cantharidin, the blister-causing oil found in several families of beetles described by the vague common name Spanish fly has been used as an aphrodisiac in some societies.

Blood-feeding insects like ticks, horseflies, and mosquitoes inject multiple bioactive compounds into their prey. These insects have long been used by practitioners of Eastern Medicine to prevent blood clot formation or thrombosis, suggesting possible applications in scientific medicine. Over 1280 protein families have been associated with the saliva of blood feeding organisms, including inhibitors of platelet aggregation, ADP, arachidonic acid, thrombin, PAF, anticoagulants, vasodilators, vasoconstrictors, antihistamines, sodium channel blockers, complement inhibitors, pore formers, inhibitors of angiogenesis, anaesthetics, AMPs and microbial pattern recognition molecules, and parasite enhancers/activators.

=== In science and technology ===
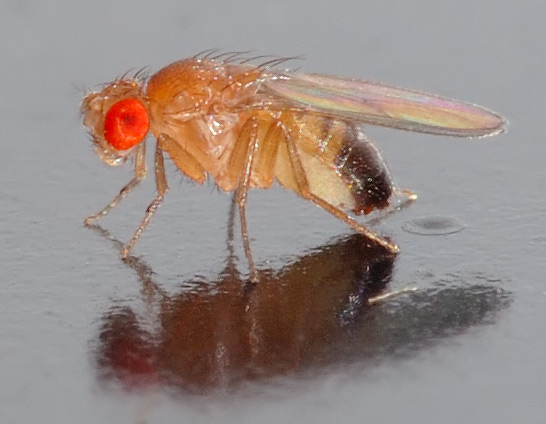
The common fruitfly Drosophila melanogaster is one of the most widely used model organisms in biological research.

Insects play an important role in biological research. Because of its small size, short generation time and high fecundity, the common fruit fly Drosophila melanogaster was selected as a model organism for studies of the genetics of higher eukaryotes. D. melanogaster has been an essential part of studies into principles like genetic linkage, interactions between genes, chromosomal genetics, evolutionary developmental biology, animal behaviour and evolution. Because genetic systems are well conserved among eukaryotes, understanding basic cellular processes like DNA replication or transcription in fruit flies helps scientists to understand those processes in other eukaryotes, including humans. The genome of D. melanogaster was sequenced in 2000, reflecting the fruit fly's important role in biological research. 70% of the fly genome is similar to the human genome, supporting the Darwinian theory of evolution from a single origin of life.

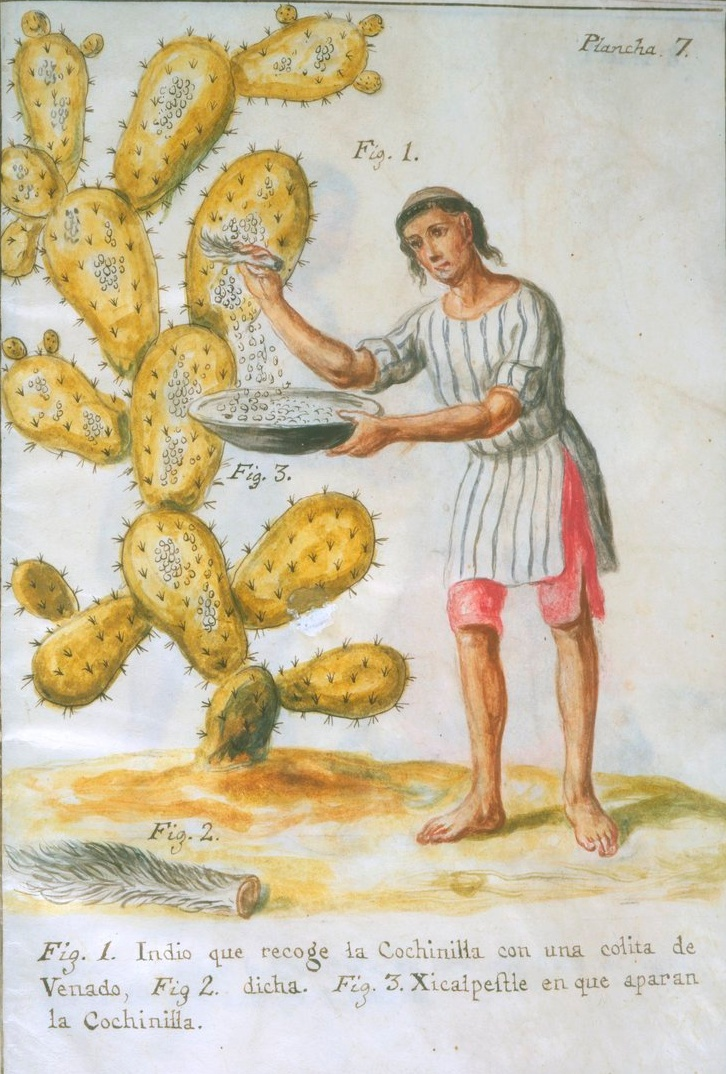
Cochineal scale insects being collected from a prickly pear in Central America. Illustration by José Antonio de Alzate y Ramírez, 1777

Some hemipterans are used to produce dyestuffs such as carmine (also called cochineal). The scale insect Dactylopius coccus produces the brilliant red-coloured carminic acid to deter predators. Up to 100,000 scale insects are needed to make a kilogram (2.2 lbs) of cochineal dye.

A similarly enormous number of lac bugs are needed to make a kilogram of shellac, a brush-on colourant and wood finish. Additional uses of this traditional product include the waxing of citrus fruits to extend their shelf-life, and the coating of pills to moisture-proof them, provide slow-release or mask the taste of bitter ingredients.

Kermes is a red dye from the dried bodies of the females of a scale insect in the genus Kermes, primarily Kermes vermilio. Kermes are native to the Mediterranean region, living on the sap of the kermes oak. They were used as a red dye by the ancient Greeks and Romans. The kermes dye is a rich red, and has good colour fastness in silk and wool.

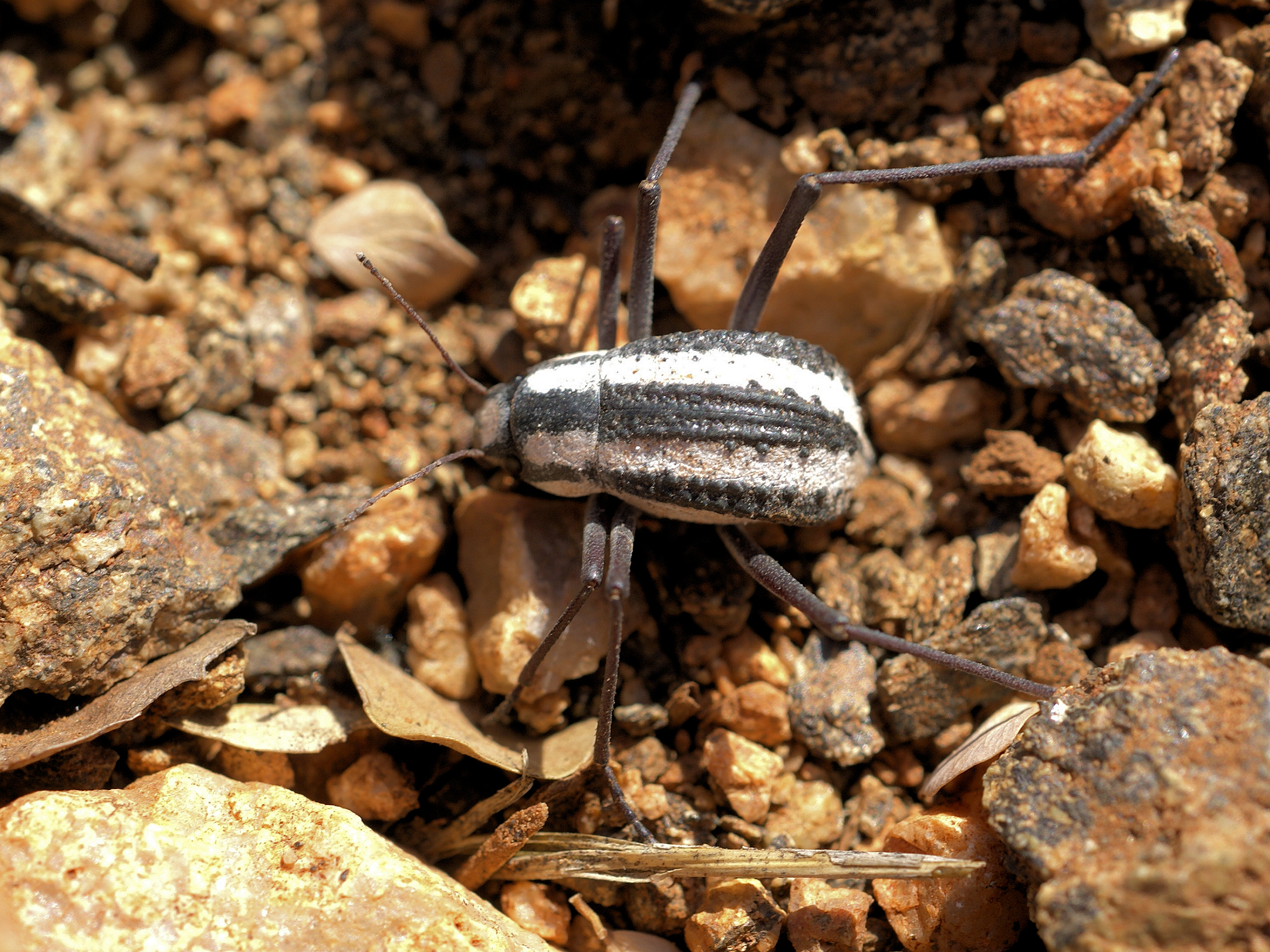
Target for biomimicry research: the Namib desert beetle, Stenocara gracilipes, channels water from fog down its wings.

Insect attributes are sometimes mimicked in architecture, as at the Eastgate Centre, Harare, which uses passive cooling, storing heat in the morning and releasing it in the warm parts of the day. The target of this piece of biomimicry is the structure of the mounds of termites such as Macrotermes michaelseni which effectively cool the nests of these social insects. The properties of the Namib desert beetle's exoskeleton, in particular its wing-cases (elytra) which have bumps with hydrophilic (water-attracting) tips and hydrophobic (water-shedding) sides, have been mimicked in a film coating designed for the British Ministry of Defence, to capture water in arid regions.

=== In textiles ===
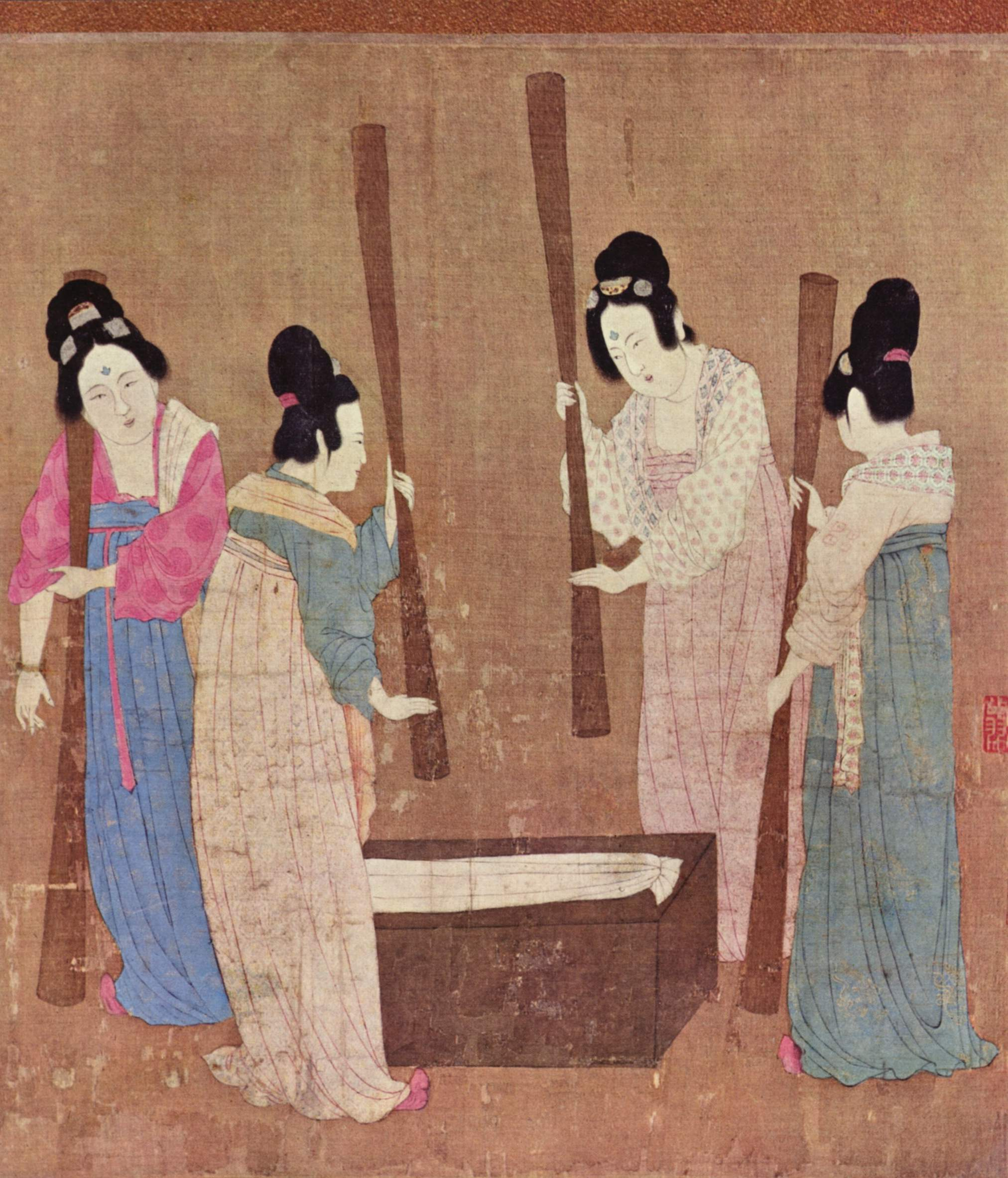
Court Ladies Preparing Newly Woven Silk, Song dynasty, 1100–1133

Silkworms, the caterpillars and pupae of the moth Bombyx mori, have been reared to produce silk in China from the Neolithic Yangshao period onwards, c. 5000 BC. Production spread to India by 140 AD. The caterpillars are fed on mulberry leaves. The cocoon, produced after the fourth moult, is covered with a continuous filament of the silk protein, fibroin, gummed together with sericin. In the traditional process, the gum is removed by soaking in hot water, and the silk is then unwound from the cocoon and reeled. Filaments are spun together to make silk thread. Commerce in silk between China and countries to its west began in ancient times, with silk known from an Egyptian mummy of 1070 BC, and later to the ancient Greeks and Romans. The Silk Road leading west from China was opened in the 2nd century AD, helping to drive trade in silk and other goods.

=== In warfare ===
The use of insects for warfare may have been attempted in the Middle Ages or earlier, but was first systematically researched by several nations during the 20th century. It was put into practice by the Japanese army's Unit 731 in attacks on China during the Second World War, killing almost 500,000 Chinese people with fleas infected with plague and flies infected with cholera. Also in the Second World War, the French and Germans explored the use of Colorado beetles to destroy enemy potato crops. During the Cold War, the US Army considered using yellow fever mosquitoes to attack Soviet cities.

== Symbolic uses ==
=== In mythology and folklore ===
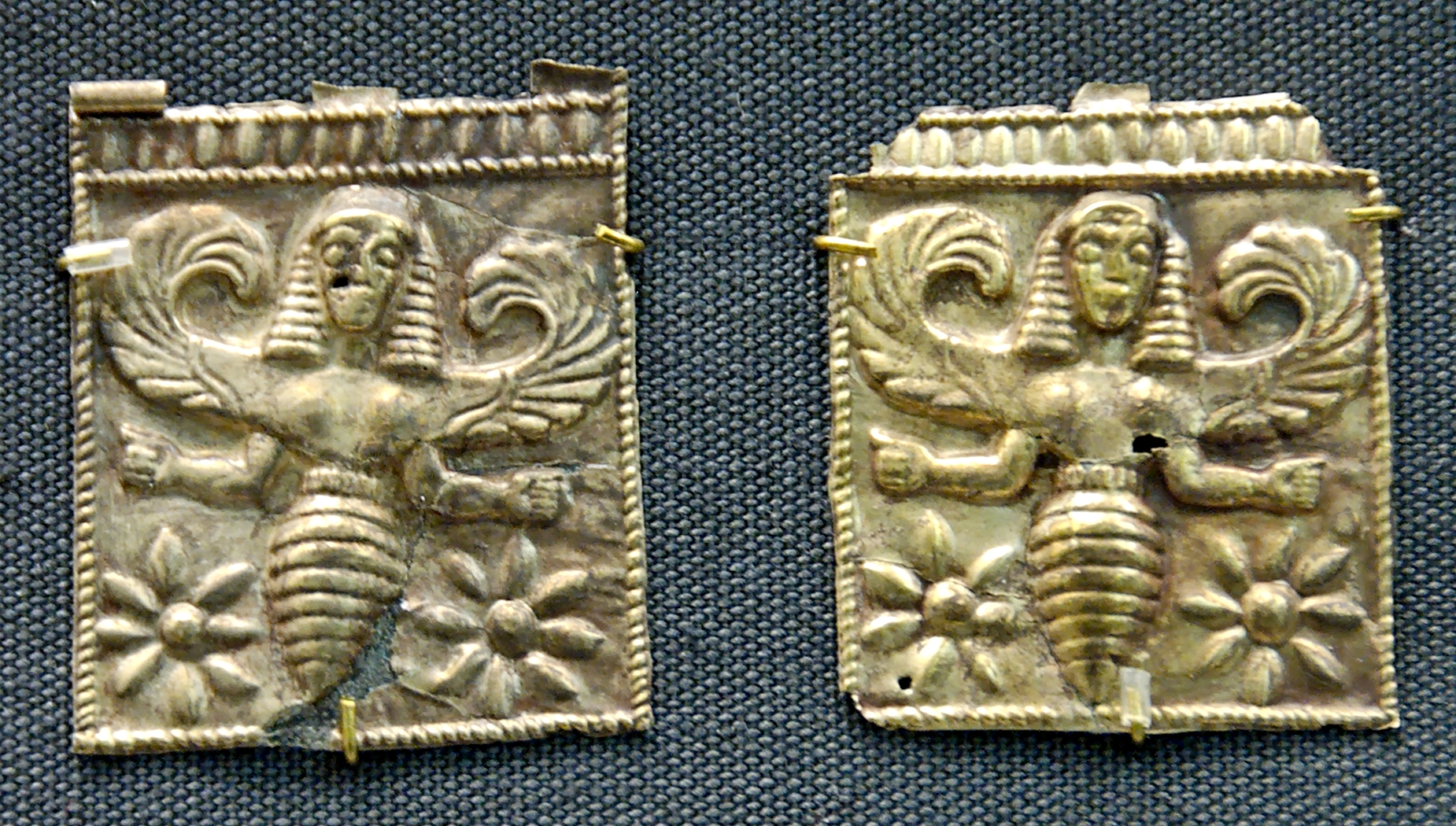
Gold plaques embossed with winged bee goddesses, perhaps the Thriai, found at Camiros Rhodes, dated to the 7th century BC.

Insects have appeared in mythology around the world from ancient times. Among the insect groups featuring in myths are the bee, butterfly, cicada, fly, dragonfly, praying mantis and scarab beetle. Scarab beetles held religious and cultural symbolism in Old Egypt, Greece and some shamanistic Old World cultures. The ancient Chinese regarded cicadas as symbols of rebirth or immortality. In the Homeric Hymn to Aphrodite, the goddess Aphrodite retells the legend of how Eos, the goddess of the dawn, requested Zeus to let her lover Tithonus live forever as an immortal. Zeus granted her request, but, because Eos forgot to ask him to also make Tithonus ageless, Tithonus never died, but he did grow old. Eventually, he became so tiny and shriveled that he turned into the first cicada.

In an ancient Sumerian poem, a fly helps the goddess Inanna when her husband Dumuzid is being chased by galla demons. Flies also appear on Old Babylonian seals as symbols of Nergal, the god of death and fly-shaped lapis lazuli beads were often worn by many different cultures in ancient Mesopotamia, along with other kinds of fly-jewellery. The Akkadian Epic of Gilgamesh contains allusions to dragonflies, signifying the impossibility of immortality.

Amongst the Arrernte people of Australia, honey ants and witchety grubs served as personal clan totems. In the case of the San bushmen of the Kalahari, it is the praying mantis which holds much cultural significance including creation and zen-like patience in waiting.

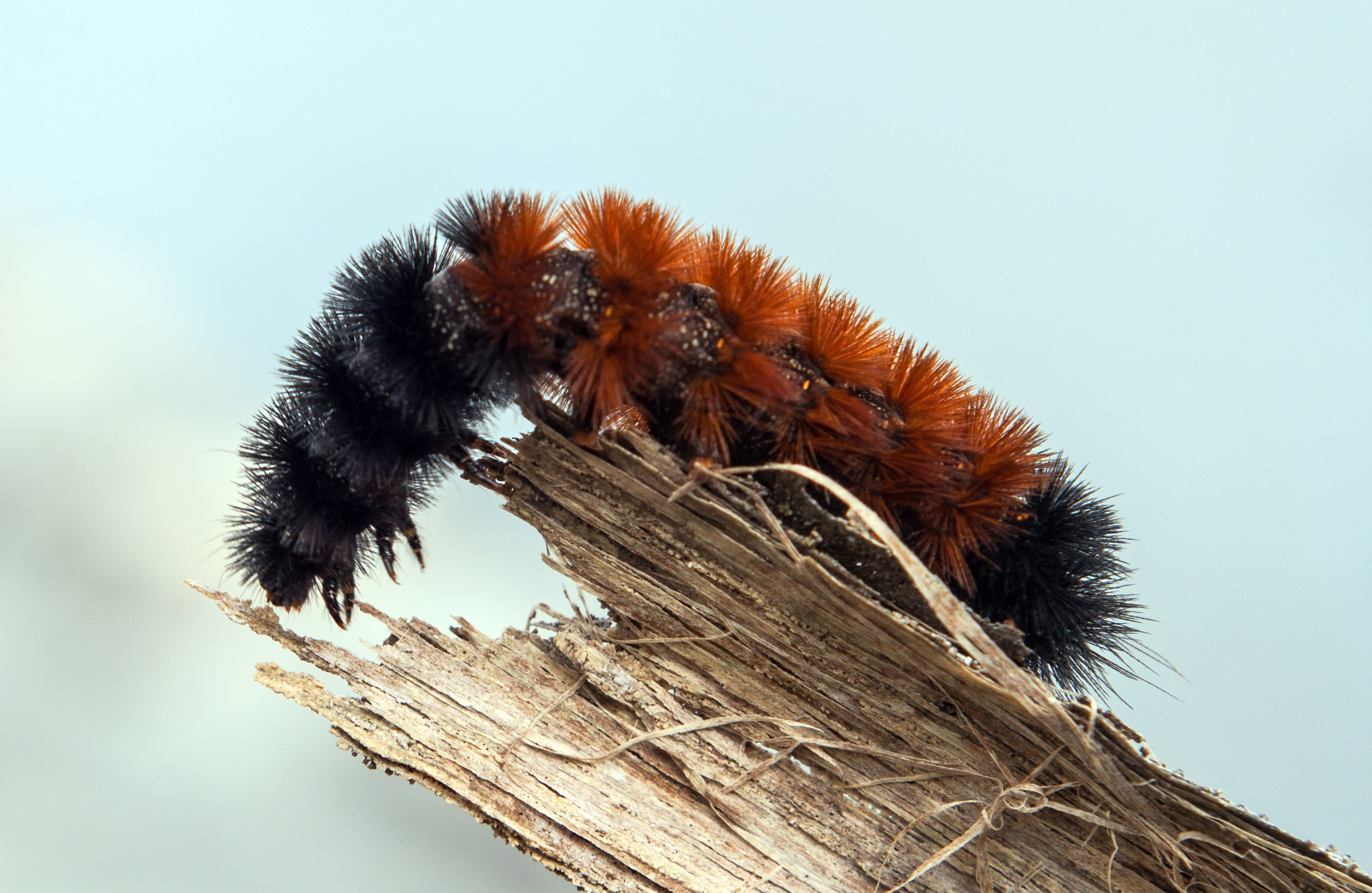
Woolly bear caterpillar larva of the isabella tiger moth, Pyrrharctia isabella, is celebrated in the annual Woollybear Festival of the American Great Lakes.

Insects feature in folklore around the world. In China, farmers traditionally regulated their crop planting according to the Awakening of the Insects, when temperature shifts and monsoon rains bring insects out of hibernation. Most "awakening" customs are related to eating snacks like pancakes, parched beans, pears, and fried corn, symbolizing harmful insects in the field.

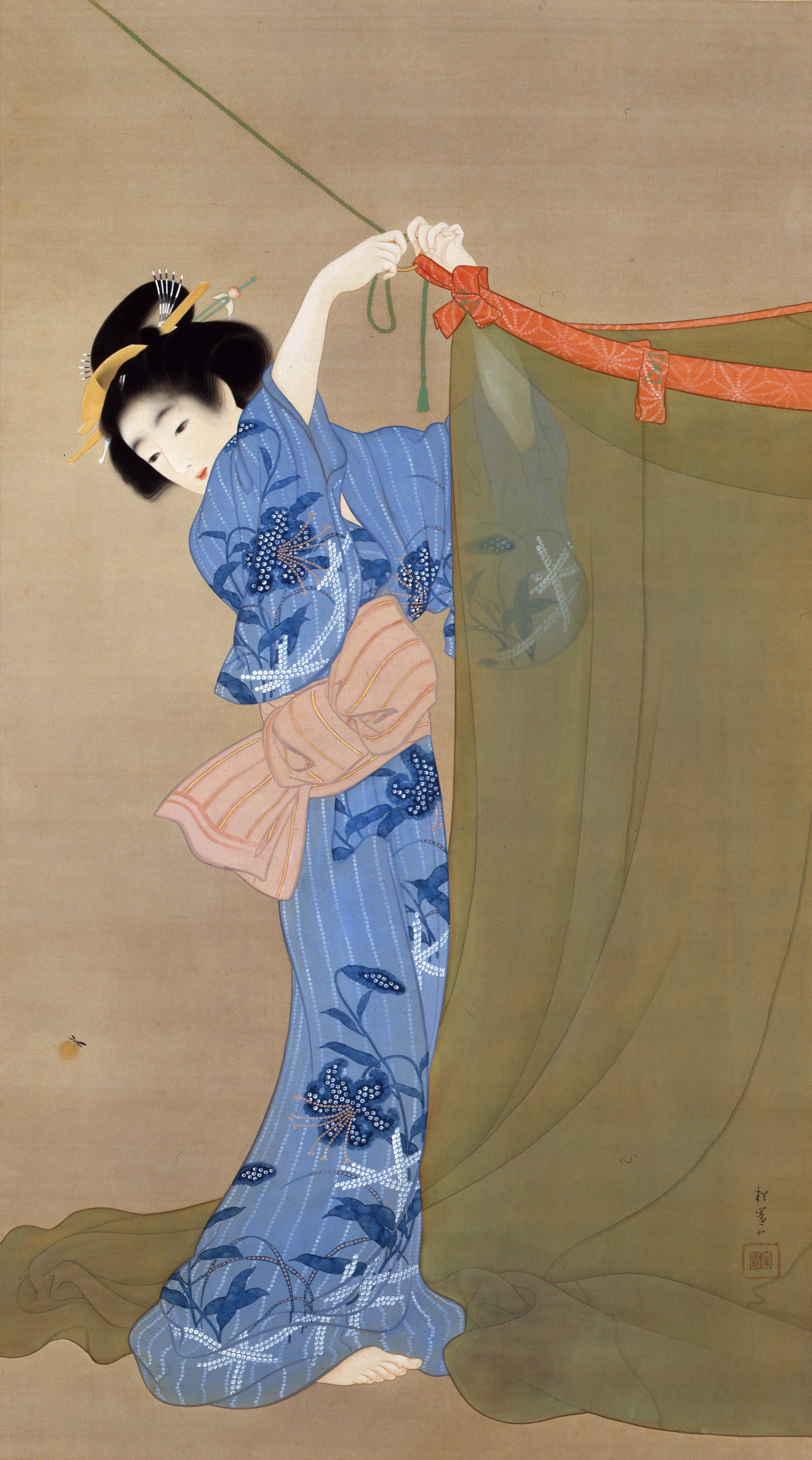
Shoen Uemura - firefly, a sign of summer in Japan

In the Great Lakes region of the United States, there is an annual Woollybear Festival that has been celebrated for over 40 years. The larvae of the species Pyrrharctia isabella (commonly known as the isabella tiger moth), with their 13 distinct segments of black and reddish brown, have the reputation in common folklore of being able to forecast the coming winter weather.

There is a common misconception that cockroaches are serious vectors of disease, but while they can carry bacteria they do not travel far, and have no bite or sting. Their shells contain a protein, arylphorin, implicated in asthma and other respiratory conditions.

Among the deep-sea fishermen of Greenock in Scotland, there is a belief that if a fly falls into a glass from which a person has been drinking, or is about to drink, it is a sure omen of good luck to the drinker.

Many people believe the urban myth that the daddy longlegs (Opiliones) has the most poisonous bite in the spider world, but that the fangs are too small to penetrate human skin. This is untrue on several counts. None of the known species of harvestmen have venom glands; their chelicerae are not hollowed fangs but grasping claws that are typically very small and definitely not strong enough to break human skin.

In Japan, the emergence of fireflies and rhinoceros beetles signify the anticipated changing of the seasons.

=== In religion ===
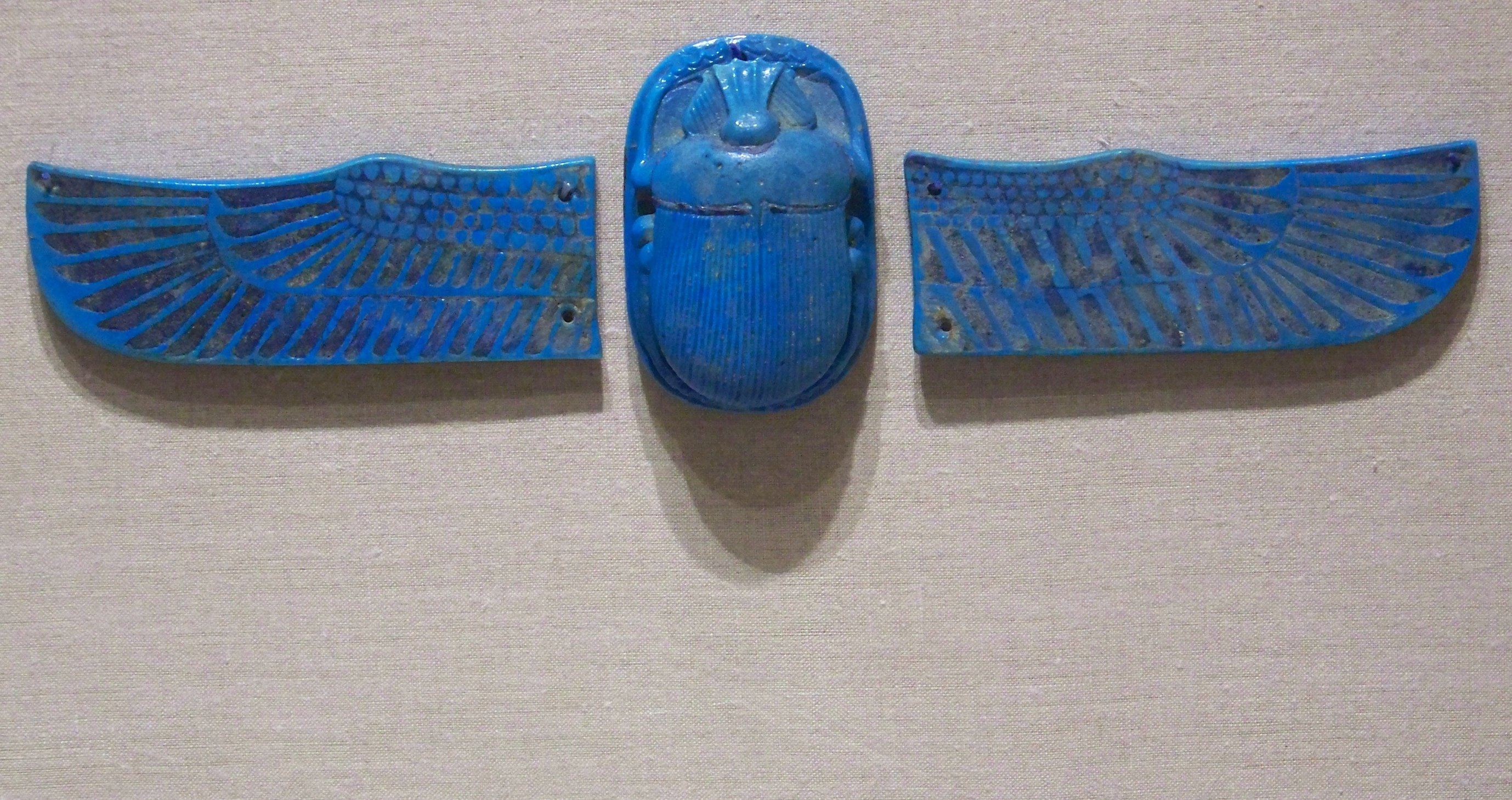
Scarab with separate wings, c. 712-342 BC.

In the Brazilian Amazon, members of the Tupí–Guaraní language family have been observed using Pachycondyla commutata ants during female rite-of-passage ceremonies, and prescribing the sting of Pseudomyrmex spp. for fevers and headaches.

The red harvester ant Pogonomyrmex californicus has been widely used by natives of Southern California and Northern Mexico for hundreds of years in ceremonies conducted to help tribe members acquire spirit helpers through hallucination. During the ritual, young men are sent away from the tribe and consume large quantities of live, unmasticated ants under the supervision of an elderly member of the tribe. Ingestion of ants should lead to a prolonged state of unconsciousness, where dream helpers appear and serve as allies to the dreamer for the rest of his life.

=== In art ===
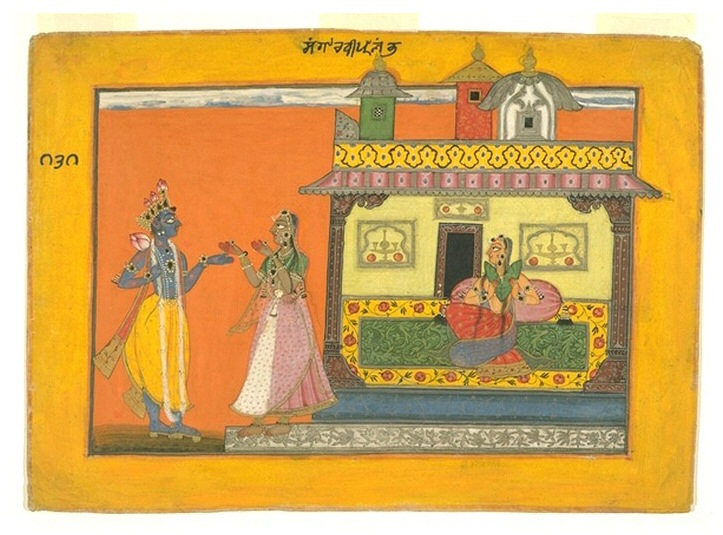
Radha and Krishna in Rasamanjari by Bhanudatta, Basohli, c. 1670. Opaque watercolour and gold on paper, with applied beetlewing fragments

Both the symbolic form and the actual body of insects have been used to adorn humans in ancient and modern times. A recurrent theme for ancient cultures in Europe and the Near East regarded the sacred image of a bee or human with insect features. Often referred to as the bee "goddess", these images were found in gems and stones. An onyx gem from Knossos (ancient Crete) dating to approximately 1500 BC illustrates a Bee goddess with bull horns above her head. In this instance, the figure is surrounded by dogs with wings, most likely representing Hecate and Artemis – gods of the underworld, similar to the Egyptian gods Akeu and Anubis.

Beetlewing art is an ancient craft technique using iridescent beetle wings practiced traditionally in Thailand, Myanmar, India, China and Japan. Beetlewing pieces are used as an adornment to paintings, textiles and jewelry. Different species of metallic wood-boring beetle wings were used depending on the region, but traditionally the most valued were those from beetles belonging to the genus Sternocera. The practice comes from across Asia and Southeast Asia, especially Thailand, Myanmar, Japan, India and China. In Thailand beetlewings were preferred to decorate clothing (shawls and Sabai cloth) and jewellery in former court circles.

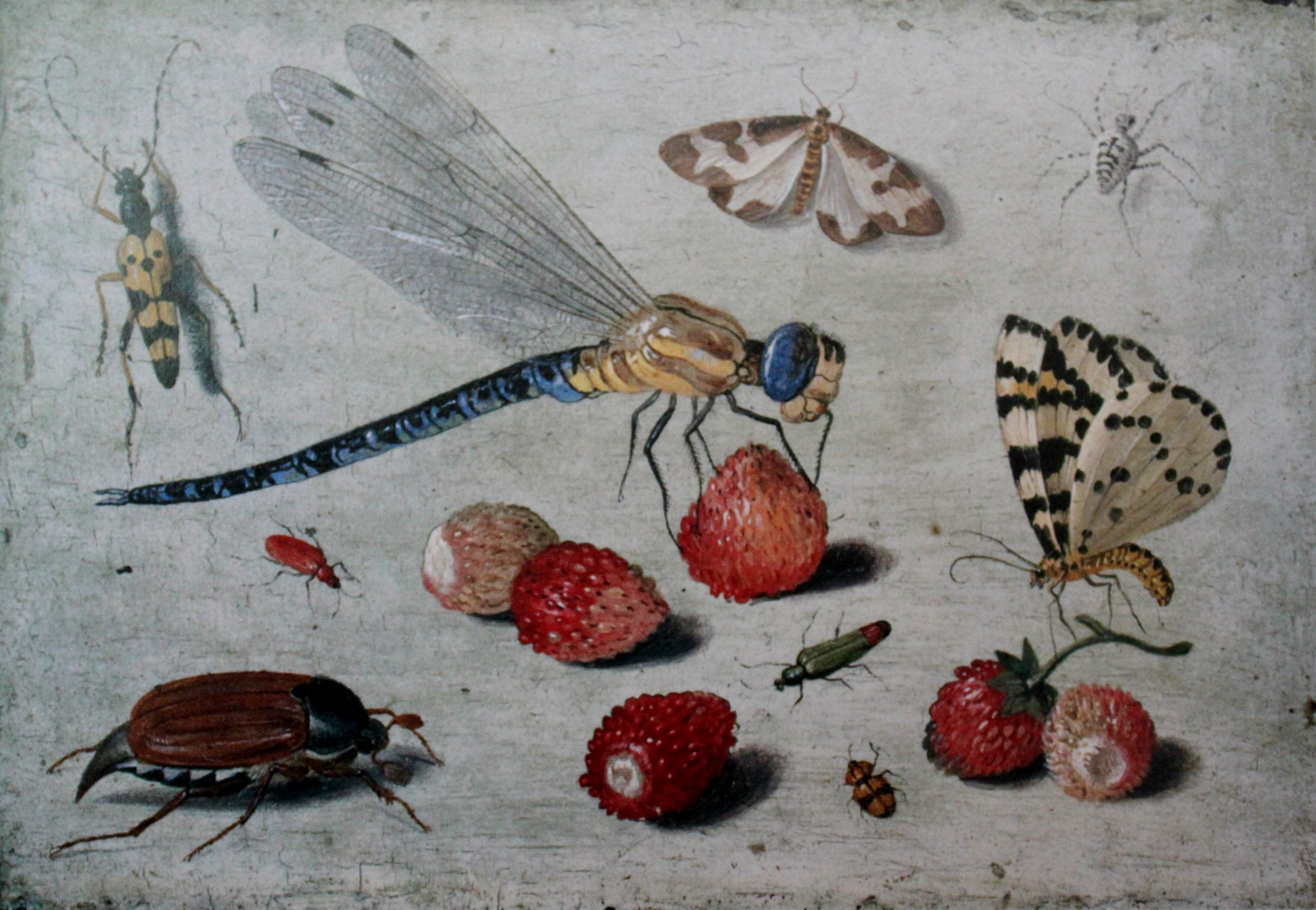
A Dragon-fly, Two Moths, a Spider and Some Beetles, With Wild Strawberries by Jan van Kessel, 17th century. Wasp beetle, top left; clouded border moth, top right; migrant hawker dragonfly and cardinal beetle, centre left; magpie moth, centre right; cockchafer, lower left.

The Canadian entomologist Charles Howard Curran's 1945 book, Insects of the Pacific World, noted women from India and Sri Lanka, who kept 1 1/2 inch (38 mm) long, iridescent greenish coppery beetles of the species Chrysochroa ocellata as pets. These living jewels were worn on festive occasions, probably with a small chain attached to one leg anchored to the clothing to prevent escape. Afterwards, the insects were bathed, fed, and housed in decorative cages. Living jewelled beetles have also been worn and kept as pets in Mexico.

Butterflies have long inspired humans with their life cycle, color, and ornate patterns. The novelist Vladimir Nabokov was also a renowned butterfly expert. He published and illustrated many butterfly species, stating:

I discovered in nature the nonutilitarian delights that I sought in art. Both were a form of magic, both were games of intricate enchantment and deception.

It was the aesthetic complexity of insects that led Nabokov to reject natural selection.

The naturalist Ian MacRae writes of butterflies:

the animal is at once awkward, flimsy, strange, bouncy in flight, yet beautiful and immensely sympathetic; it is painfully transient, albeit capable of extreme migrations and transformations. Images and phrases such as "kaleidoscopic instabilities," "oxymoron of similarities," "rebellious rainbows," "visible darkness" and "souls of stone" have much in common. They bring together the two terms of a conceptual contradiction, thereby facilitating the mixing of what should be discrete and mutually exclusive categories ... In positing such questions, butterfly science, an inexhaustible, complex, and finely nuanced field, becomes not unlike the human imagination, or the field of literature itself. In the natural history of the animal, we begin to sense its literary and artistic possibilities.

The photographer Kjell Sandved spent 25 years documenting all 26 characters of the Latin alphabet using the wing patterns of butterflies and moths as The Butterfly Alphabet.

In 2011, the artist Anna Collette created over 10,000 individual ceramic insects at Nottingham Castle, "Stirring the Swarm". Reviews of the exhibit offered a compelling narrative for cultural entomology: "the unexpected use of materials, dark overtones, and the straightforward impact of thousands of tiny multiples within the space. The exhibition was at once both exquisitely beautiful and deeply repulsive, and this strange duality was fascinating."

=== In literature and film ===
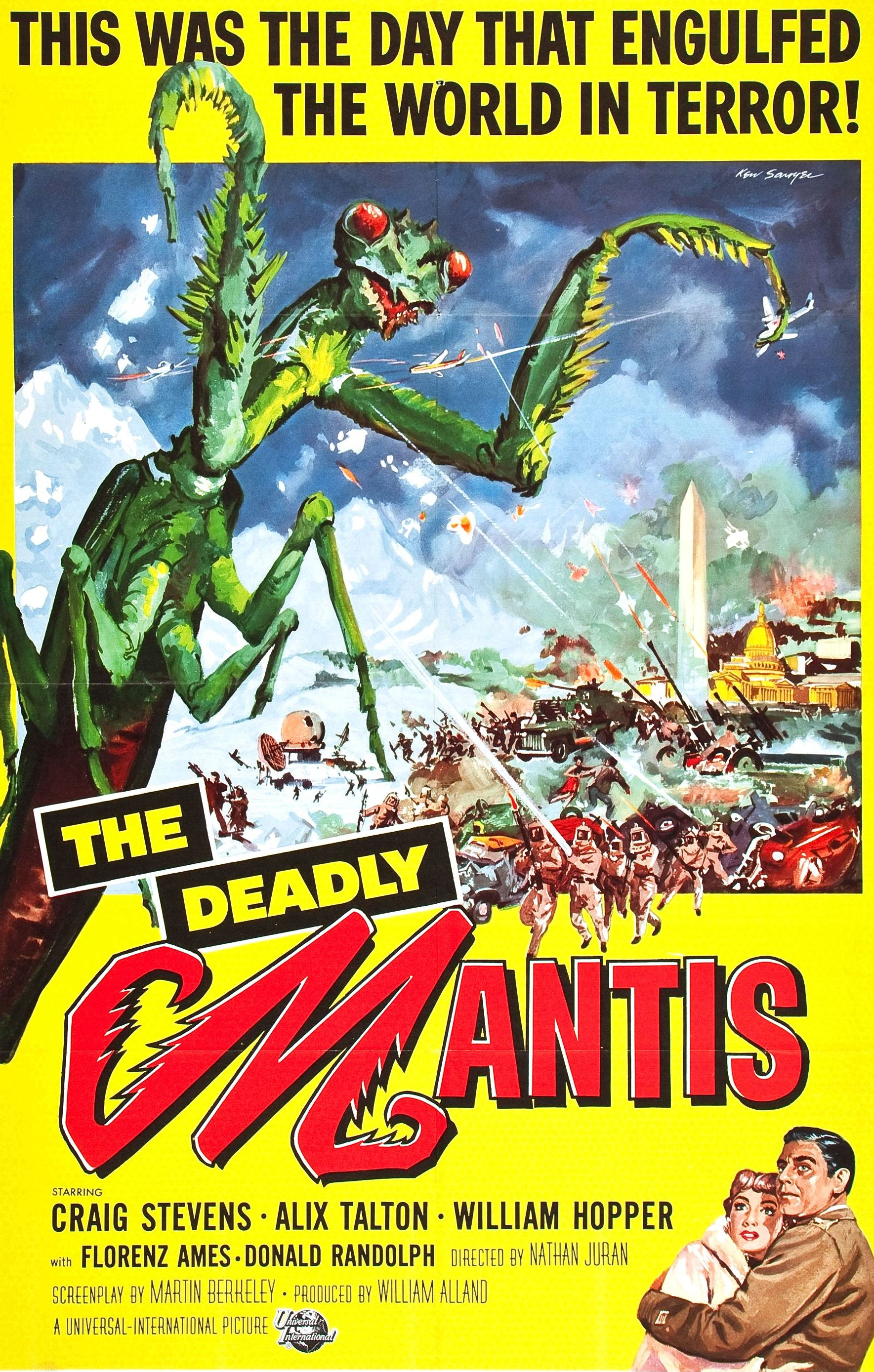
Poster for the 1957 film The Deadly Mantis

The Ancient Greek playwright Aeschylus has a gadfly pursue and torment Io, a maiden associated with the moon, watched constantly by the eyes of the herdsman Argus, associated with all the stars: "Io: Ah! Hah! Again the prick, the stab of gadfly-sting! O earth, earth, hide, the hollow shape—Argus—that evil thing—the hundred-eyed." William Shakespeare, inspired by Aeschylus, has Tom o'Bedlam in King Lear, "Whom the foul fiend hath led through fire and through flame, through ford and whirlpool, o'er bog and quagmire", driven mad by the constant pursuit. In Antony and Cleopatra, Shakespeare similarly likens Cleopatra's hasty departure from the Actium battlefield to that of a cow chased by a gadfly. H. G. Wells introduced giant wasps in his 1904 novel The Food of the Gods and How It Came to Earth, making use of the newly discovered growth hormones to lend plausibility to his science fiction. Lafcadio Hearn's essay Butterflies analyses the treatment of the butterfly in Japanese literature, both prose and poetry. He notes that these often allude to Chinese tales, such as of the young woman that the butterflies took to be a flower. He translates 22 Japanese haiku poems about butterflies, including one by the haiku master Matsuo Bashō, said to suggest happiness in springtime: "Wake up! Wake up!—I will make thee my comrade, thou sleeping butterfly."

The novelist Vladimir Nabokov was the son of a professional lepidopterist, and was interested in butterflies himself. He wrote his novel Lolita while travelling on his annual butterfly-collection trips in the western United States. He eventually became a leading lepidopterist. This is reflected in his fiction, where for example The Gift devotes two whole chapters (of five) to the tale of a father and son on a butterfly expedition.

Horror films involving insects, sometimes called "big bug movies", include the pioneering 1954 Them!, featuring giant ants mutated by radiation, and the 1957 The Deadly Mantis.

The Far Side, a newspaper cartoon, has been used by professor of Michael Burgett as a teaching tool in his entomology class; The Far Side and its author Gary Larson have been acknowledged by biologist Dale H. Clayton his colleague for "the enormous contribution" Larson has made to their field through his cartoons.

=== In music ===
Flight of the Bumblebee
Flight of the Bumblebee performed by the US Army Band

Some popular and influential pieces of music have had insects as their subjects. The French Renaissance composer Josquin des Prez wrote a frottola entitled El Grillo (lit. 'The Cricket'). It is among the most frequently sung of his works. Nikolai Rimsky-Korsakov wrote the "Flight of the Bumblebee" in 1899–1900 as part of his opera The Tale of Tsar Saltan. The piece is one of the most recognizable pieces in classical composition. The bumblebee in the story is a prince who has been transformed into an insect so that he can fly off to visit his father. The play upon which the opera was based – written by Alexander Pushkin – originally had two more insect themes: the Flight of the Mosquito and the Flight of the Fly. The Hungarian composer Béla Bartók explained in his diary that he was attempting to depict the desperate attempts to escape of a fly caught in a cobweb in his piece From the Diary of a Fly, for piano (Mikrokosmos Vol. 6/142).

The jazz musician and philosophy professor David Rothenberg plays duets with singing insects including cicadas, crickets, and beetles.

=== In astronomy and cosmology ===
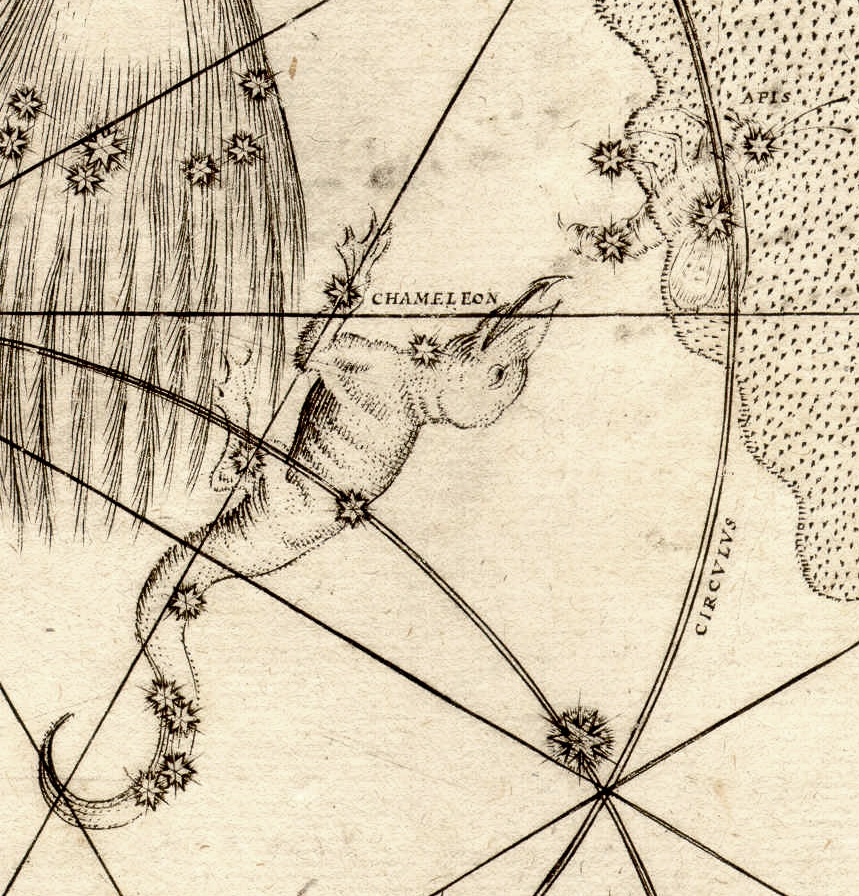
The constellation Musca (as Apis) is upper right. Detail from Johann Bayer's Uranometria, 1603

In astronomy, constellations named after arthropods include the zodiacal Scorpius, the scorpion, and Musca, the fly, also known as Apis, the bee, in the deep southern sky. Musca, the only recognised insect constellation, was named by Petrus Plancius in 1597.

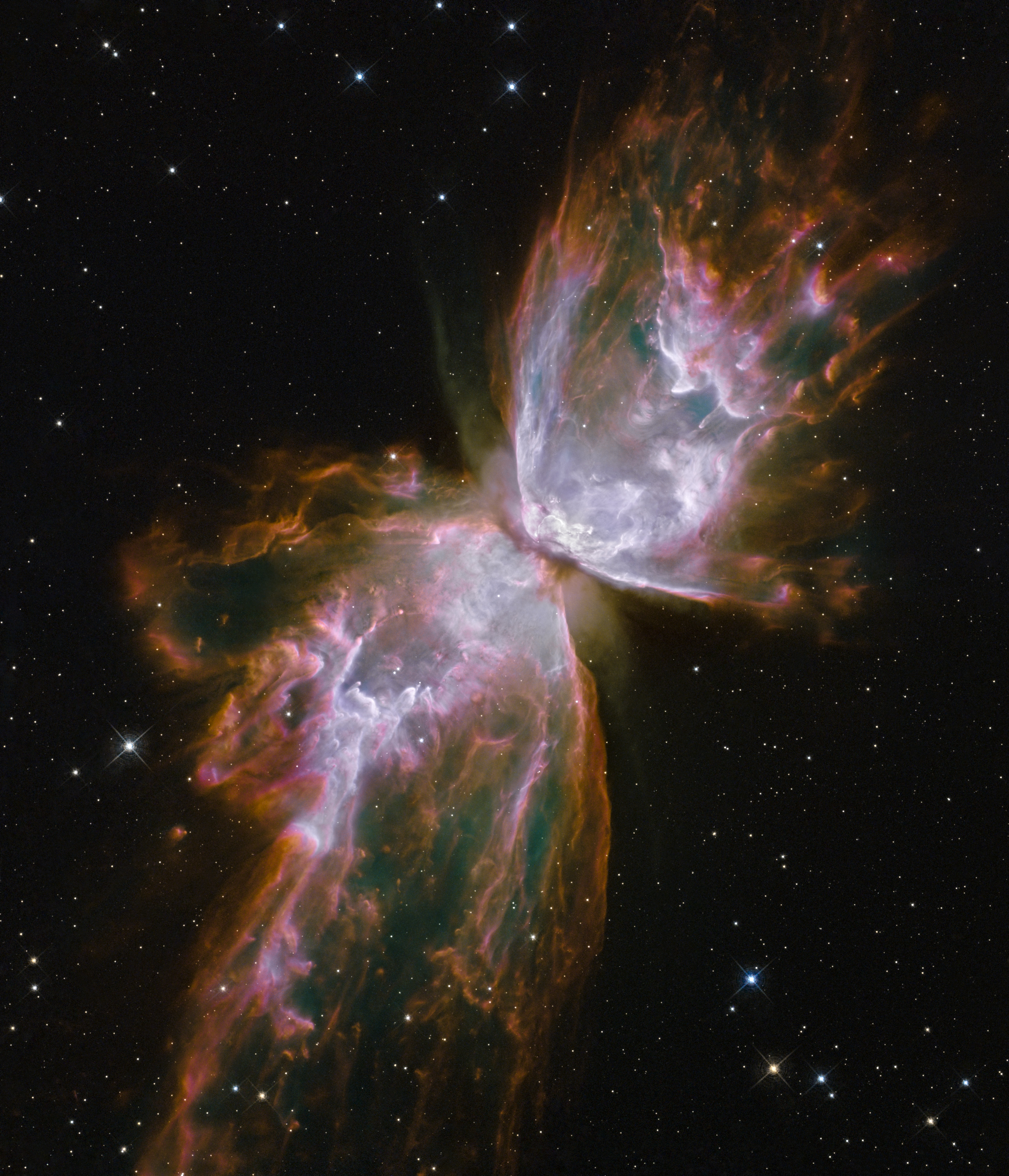
The Butterfly Nebula, NGC 6302

"The Bug Nebula", also called "The Butterfly Nebula", is a more recent discovery. Known as NGC 6302 is one of the brightest and most popular stars in the universe – popular in that its features draw the attention of a lot of researchers. It happens to be located in the Scorpius constellation. It is perfectly bipolar, and until recently, the central star was unobservable, clouded by gas, but estimated to be one of the hottest in the galaxy – 200,000 degrees Fahrenheit, perhaps 35 times hotter than the Sun.

The honey bee played a central role in the cosmology of the Mayan people. The stucco figure at the temples of Tulum known as "Ah Mucen Kab" – the Diving Bee God – bears resemblance to the insect in the Codex Tro-Cortesianus identified as a bee. Such reliefs might have indicated towns and villages that produce honey. Modern Mayan authorities say the figure also have a connection to modern cosmology. Mayan mythology expert Migel Angel Vergara relates that the Mayans held a belief that bees came from Venus, the "Second Sun." The relief might be indicative of another "insect deity", that of Xux Ex, the Mayan "wasp star." The Mayan embodied Venus in the form of the god Kukulkán (also known as or related to Gukumatz and Quetzalcoatl in other parts of Mexico), Quetzalcoatl is a Mesoamerican deity whose name in Nahuatl means "feathered serpent". The cult was the first Mesoamerican religion to transcend the old Classic Period linguistic and ethnic divisions. This cult facilitated communication and peaceful trade among peoples of many different social and ethnic backgrounds. Although the cult was originally centered on the ancient city of Chichén Itzá in the modern Mexican state of Yucatán, it spread as far as the Guatemalan highlands.

=== In costumes ===
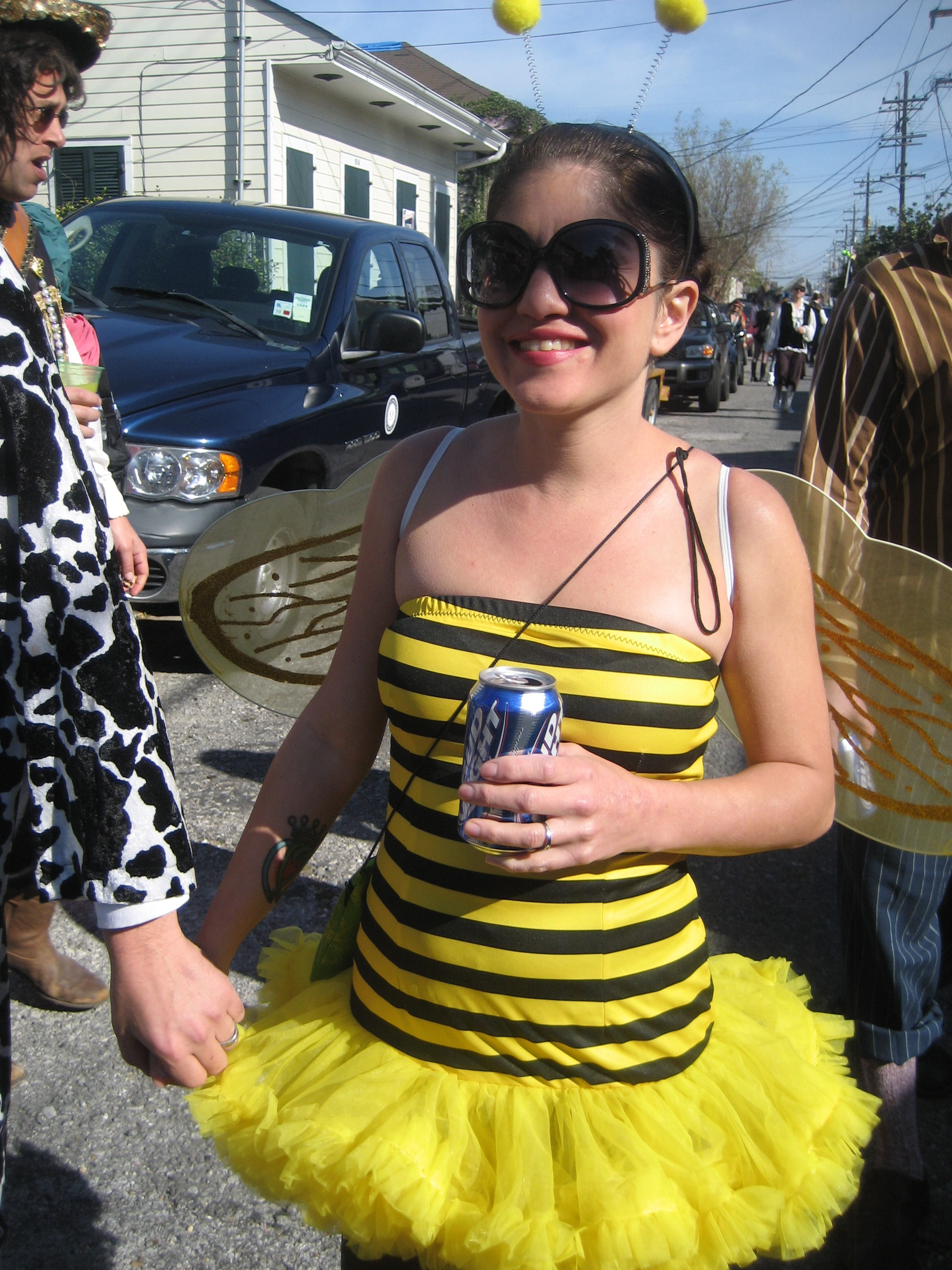
A bee costume for a Mardi Gras celebration

Bee and other insect costumes are worn in a variety of countries for parties, carnivals and other celebrations.

Ovo is an insect-themed production by the world renowned Canadian entertainment company Cirque du Soleil. The show looks at the world of insects and its biodiversity where they go about their daily lives until a mysterious egg appears in their midst, as the insects become awestruck about this iconic object that represents the enigma and cycles of their lives. The costuming was a fusion of arthropod body types blended with superhero armour. Liz Vandal, the lead costume designer, has a special affinity for the world of the insect:

When I was just a kid I put rocks down around the yard near the fruit trees and I lifted them regularly to watch the insects who had taken up residence underneath them. I petted caterpillars and let butterflies into the house. So when I learned that OVO was inspired by insects, I immediately knew that I was in a perfect position to pay tribute to this majestic world with my costumes. All insects are beautiful and perfect; it is what they evoke for each of us that changes our perception of them."

The Webby award-winning video series Green Porno was created to showcase the reproductive habits of insects. Jody Shapiro and Rick Gilbert were responsible for translating the research and concepts that Isabella Rossellini envisioned into the paper and paste costumes which directly contribute to the series' unique visual style. The film series was driven by the creation of costumes to translate scientific research into "something visual and how to make it comical."

== See also ==
- Arthropods in culture
- Human uses of birds
- Human uses of plants
- Human interactions with insects in southern Africa
- Insects in ethics
- Insect collecting
