= Insects in art =

- Mediums: Painting, sculpture, jewelry, textiles, photography
- Notable artists: Maria Sibylla Merian; Jan van Kessel the Elder; Salvador Dalí; Jan Fabre; Damien Hirst
- Major themes: Vanitas, Metamorphosis, Mimesis, Entomology, Symbolism
- Common subjects: Bees, Butterflies, Beetles, Dragonflies, Flies

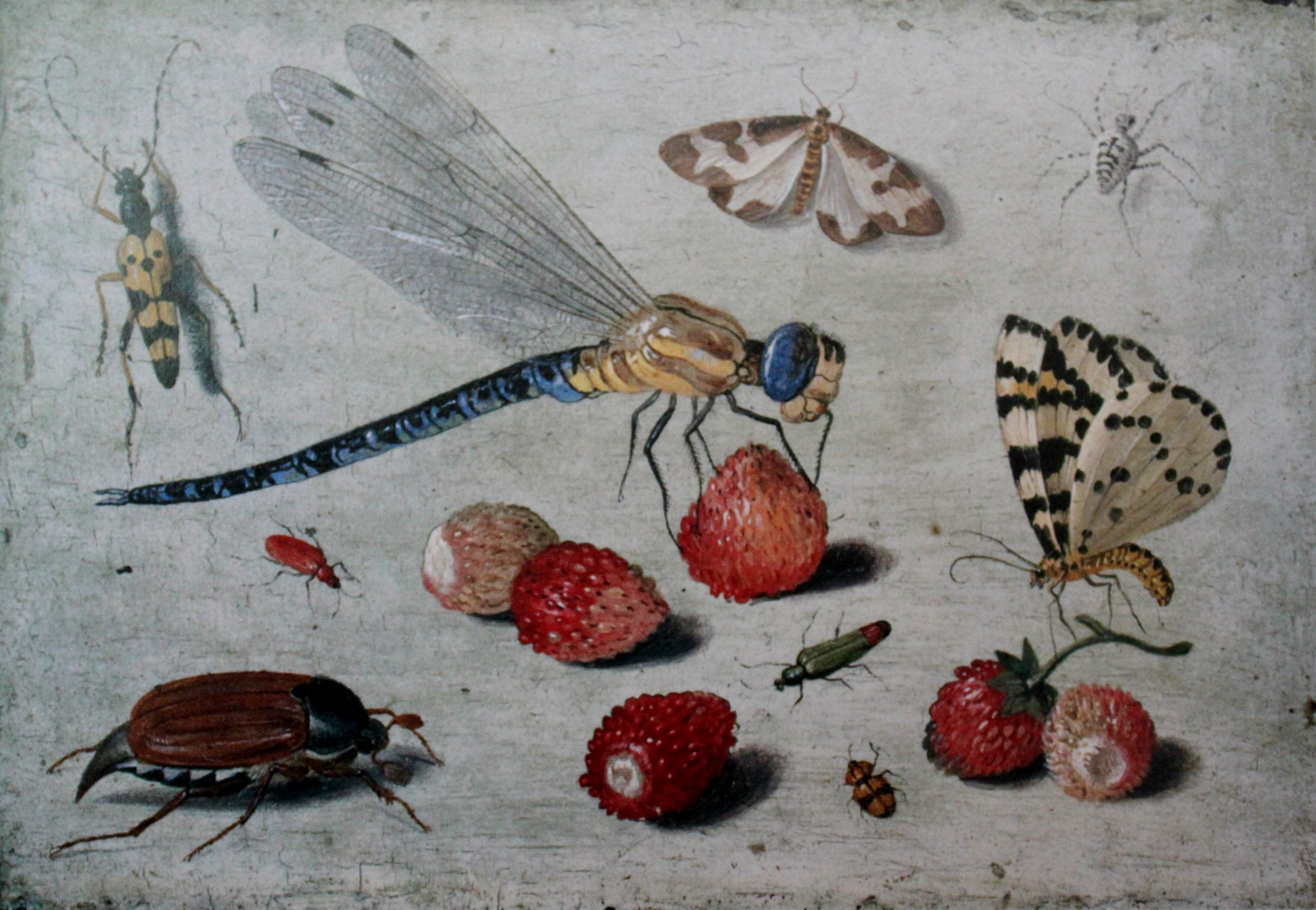
A Dragon-fly, Two Moths, a Spider and Some Beetles, With Wild Strawberries by Jan van Kessel, 17th century. A wasp-mimicking longhorn beetle, top left; clouded border moth, top right; migrant hawker dragonfly and cardinal beetle, centre left; magpie moth, centre right; cockchafer, lower left.

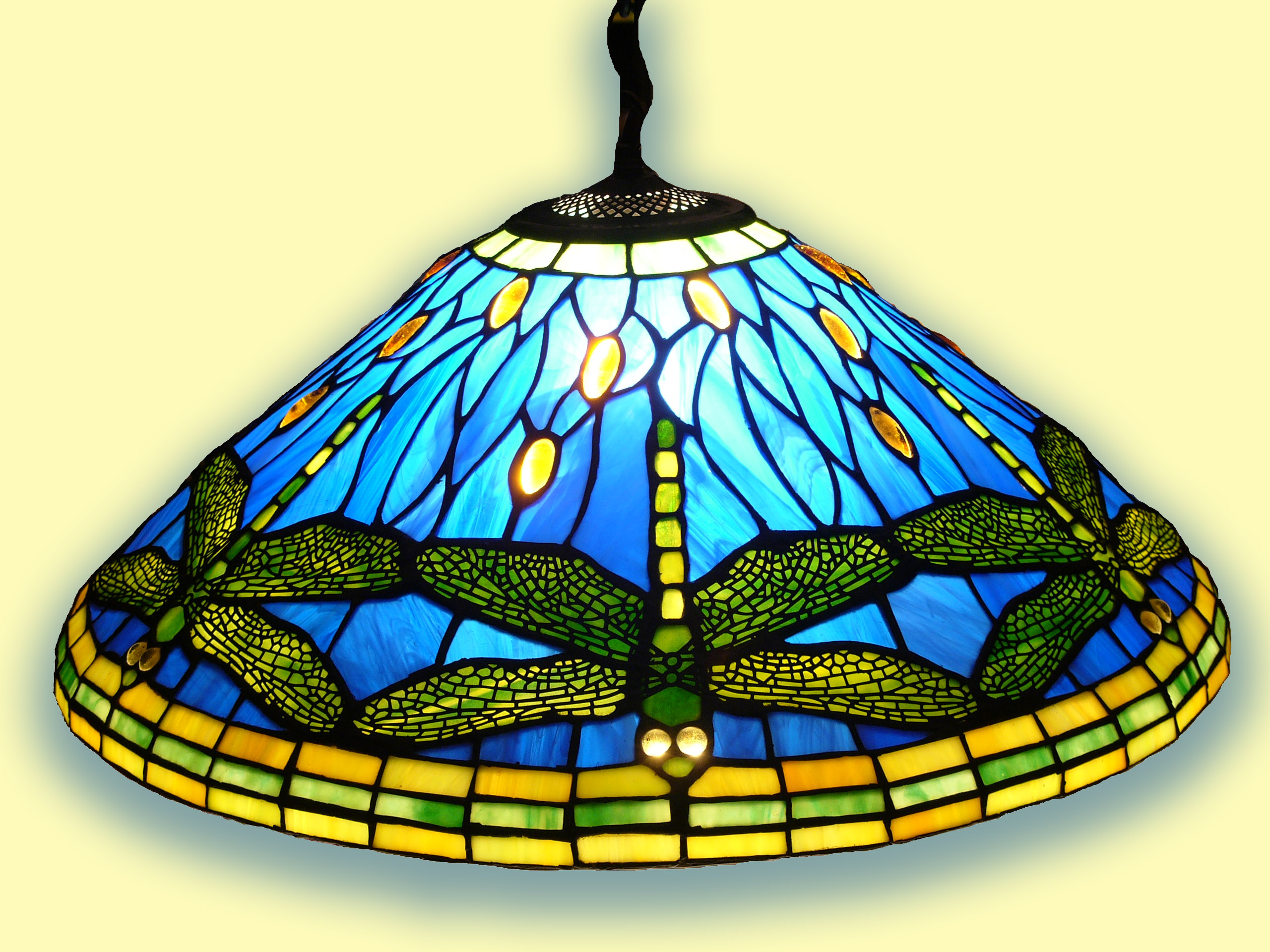
Tiffany & Co. dragonfly pendant lamp

Insects has found uses in art, as in other aspects of culture, both symbolically and physically, from ancient times. Artforms include the direct usage of beetlewing (elytra) in paintings, textiles, and jewellery, as well as the representation of insects in fine arts such as paintings and sculpture. Insects have sometimes formed characteristic features of artforms, as in Art Nouveau jewellery.

Insect groups represented in art include bees, beetles, butterflies, grasshoppers, and dragonflies.

== Overview ==
Societies across the world have from ancient to modern times used the shapes and colours of insects, and sometimes their actual bodies, in their art, whether jewellery or ceramics, body painting or textiles, paintings or sculptures. In North America, the Navajo make symbolic sandpaintings of blowflies, cicadas, corn bugs and dragonflies. The Hopi draw a variety of insects, but especially butterflies, on pottery. In other parts of the world, insects, most often honeybees, are shown in ancient rock art. Australian Aborigines often represented totemic insects in cave paintings and ritual objects. The art of cultures as widely separated as Ancient Greece, China and Japan includes bees, butterflies, crickets, cicadas and dragonflies.

== Insect groups ==
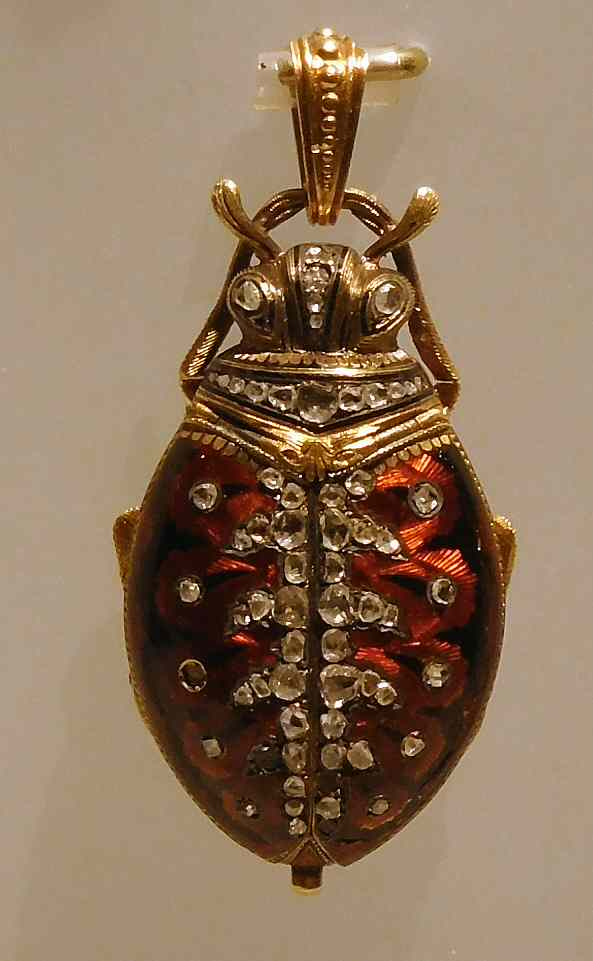
Pendant watch in shape of beetle, Switzerland 1850-1900 gold, diamond, enamel

=== Bees ===
A recurrent theme for ancient cultures in Europe and the Near East was the sacred image of a bee or human with insect features. Often referred to as the bee "goddess", these images were found in gems and stones. An onyx gem from Knossos (ancient Crete) dating to approximately 1500 BC illustrates a Bee goddess with bull horns above her head. In this instance, the figure is surrounded by dogs with wings, most likely representing Hecate and Artemis - gods of the underworld, similar to the Egyptian gods Akeu and Anubis.

In 2011, the artist Anna Collette created over 10,000 ceramic insects at Nottingham Castle for her work "Stirring the Swarm."

Canadian artist Aganetha Dyck allowed bees to modify objects such as porcelain figurines and athletic equipment by encasing them in honeycombs. Her work explores the interdependence of humans and bees while emphasizing the fragility of ecosystems. Through her art, Dyck has raised awareness about the environmental challenges faced by pollinators, including colony collapse disorder.

=== Beetles ===
Beetlewing art is an ancient craft technique using iridescent beetle wing cases (elytra), practised traditionally in Thailand, Myanmar, India, China and Japan, as well as Africa and South America. Beetlewing pieces are used as an adornment to paintings, textiles and jewellery. Different species of metallic wood-boring beetle wings were used depending on the region, but traditionally the most valued were the brilliant green wing cases of jewel beetles in the genus Sternocera (Buprestidae). In Thailand, beetlewings were used to decorate clothing (shawls and Sabai cloth) and jewellery in court circles.

The Canadian entomologist C.H. Curran's 1945 book, Insects of the Pacific World, noted women from India and Sri Lanka, who kept 1 1/2 inch long, iridescent greenish coppery beetles of the species Chrysochroa ocellata as pets. These living jewels were worn on festive occasions, probably with a small chain attached to one leg anchored to the clothing to prevent escape. Afterwards, the insects were bathed, fed, and housed in decorative cages. Living jeweled beetles have also been worn and kept as pets in Mexico.

=== Butterflies ===
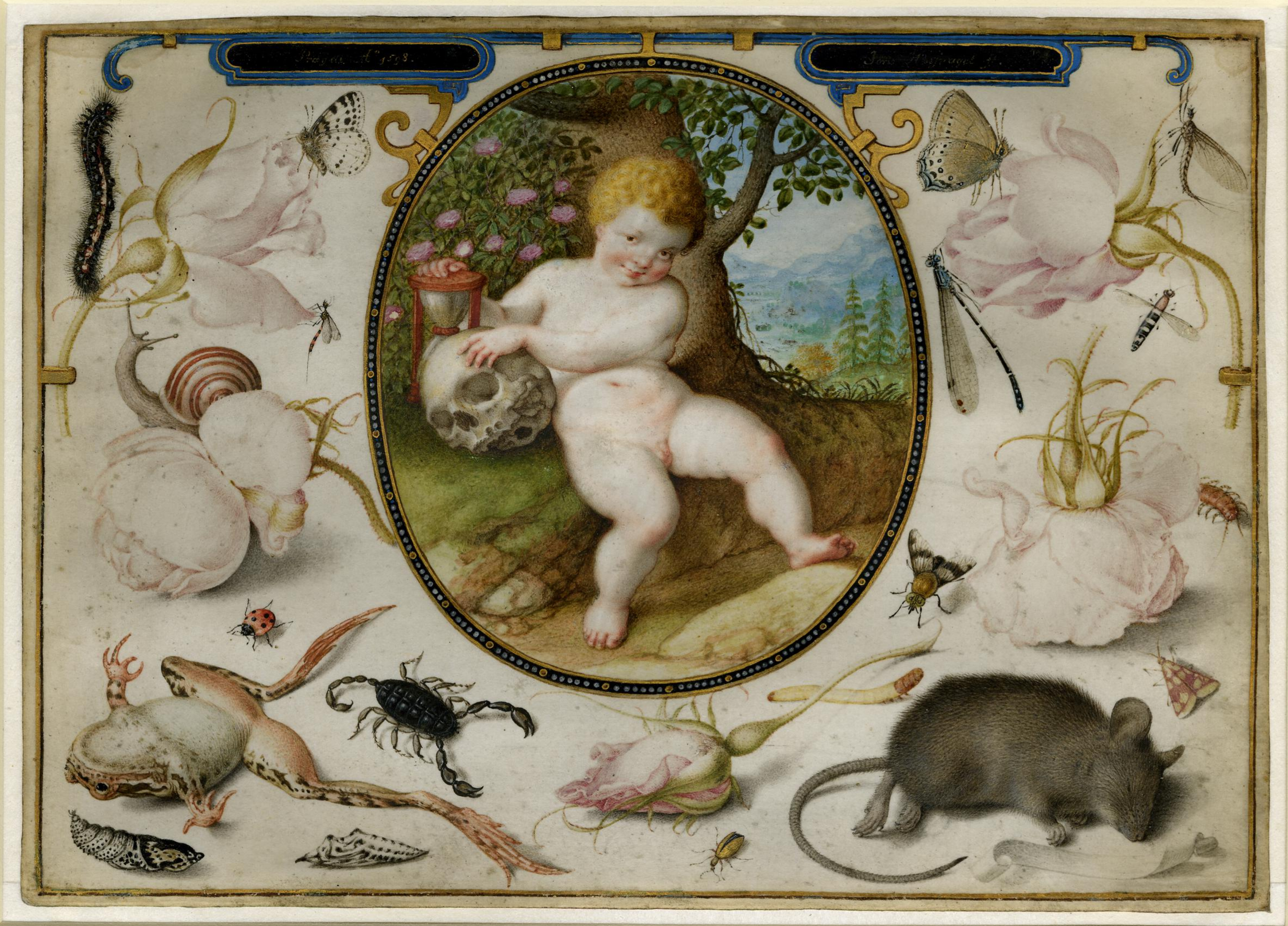
Allegory on Life and Death, a collaboration between Joris and Jacob Hoefnagel, 1598. Visible are Lepidoptera, Diptera, Coleoptera, and Zygoptera.

Butterflies have long inspired humans with their life cycle, colour, and ornate patterns. The novelist Vladimir Nabokov was also a renowned butterfly expert. He published and illustrated many butterfly species, stating:

"I discovered in nature the nonutilitarian delights that I sought in art. Both were a form of magic, both were games of intricate enchantment and deception."

It was the aesthetic complexity of insects that led Nabokov to reject natural selection.

The naturalist Ian MacRae writes of butterflies:

".. . the animal is at once awkward, flimsy, strange, bouncy in flight, yet beautiful and immensely sympathetic; it is painfully transient, albeit capable of extreme migrations and transformations. Images and phrases such as "kaleidoscopic instabilities," "oxymoron of similarities," "rebellious rainbows," "visible darkness" and "souls of stone" have much in common.They bring together the two terms of a conceptual contradiction, thereby facilitating the mixing of what should be discrete and mutually exclusive categories . . . In positing such questions, butterfly science, an inexhaustible, complex, and finely nuanced field, becomes not unlike the human imagination, or the field of literature itself. In the natural history of the animal, we begin to sense its literary and artistic possibilities."

The photographer Kjell Sanded spent 25 years documenting all 26 characters of the Latin alphabet using the wing patterns of butterflies and moths as "The Butterfly Alphabet".

=== Dragonflies ===
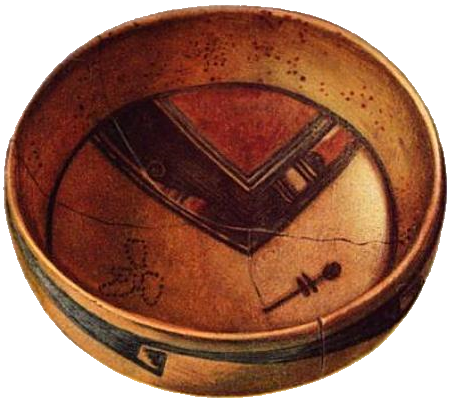
Dragonfly symbol on a Hopi bowl from Sikyátki, Arizona

For some Native American tribes, dragonflies represent swiftness and activity; for the Navajo, they symbolize pure water. They are a common motif in Zuni pottery; stylized as a double-barred cross, they appear in Hopi rock art and on Pueblo necklaces.

Images of dragonflies are common in Art Nouveau, especially in jewellery designs.

=== Flies ===
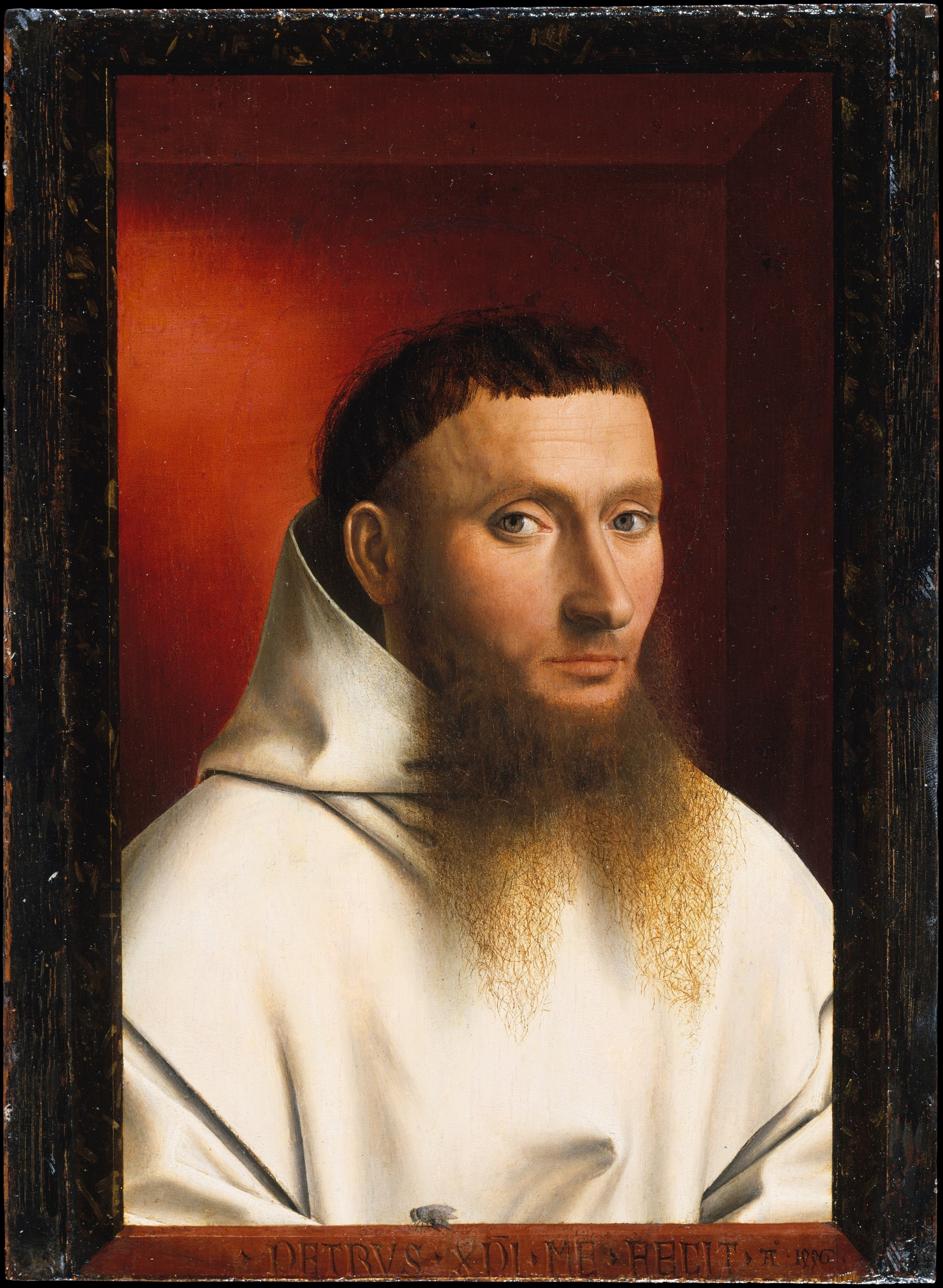
Petrus Christus's 1446 painting Portrait of a Carthusian has a musca depicta (painted fly) on a trompe-l'œil frame.

Musca depicta ("painted fly" in Latin) is a depiction of a fly as a conspicuous element of various paintings. This feature was widespread in 15th and 16th centuries paintings and its presence may be explained as a jest; to symbolize the worthiness of even the smallest of God's creations; as an artistic privilege; to show that the portrait is post mortem; or as an imitation of works of previous painters.

=== Grasshoppers ===
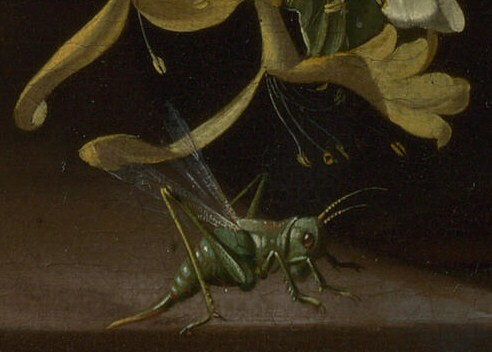
Detail of grasshopper on table in Rachel Ruysch's painting Flowers in a Vase, c. 1685. National Gallery, London

Grasshoppers are occasionally depicted in artworks, such as the Dutch Golden Age painter Balthasar van der Ast's still life oil painting Flowers in a Vase with Shells and Insects, c. 1630, though the insect may be a bush-cricket.

Another grasshopper is found in Rachel Ruysch's still life Flowers in a Vase, c. 1685. The seemingly static scene is animated by a "grasshopper on the table that looks about ready to spring", according to the gallery curator Betsy Wieseman, with other invertebrates including a spider, an ant, and two caterpillars.
