= Insects in literature =

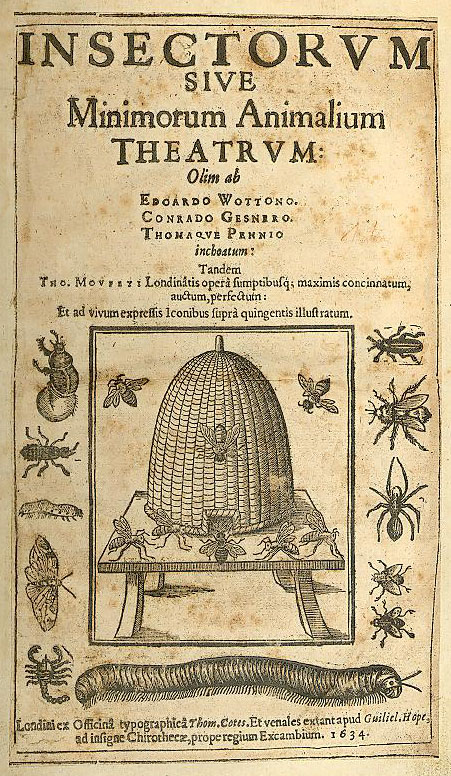
Thomas Muffett's 1634 book The Theatre of Insects

Insects have appeared in literature from classical times to the present day, an aspect of their role in culture more generally. Insects represent both positive qualities like cooperation and hard work, and negative ones like greed.

Among the positive qualities, ants and bees represent industry and cooperation from the Book of Proverbs and Aesop's fables to tales by Beatrix Potter. Insects including the dragonfly have symbolised harmony with nature, while the butterfly has represented happiness in springtime in Japanese Haiku, as well as the soul of a person who has died.

Insects have equally been used for their strangeness and alien qualities, with giant wasps and intelligent ants threatening human society in science fiction stories. Locusts have represented greed, and more literally plague and destruction, while the fly has been used to indicate death and decay, and the grasshopper has indicated improvidence. The horsefly has been used from classical times to portray torment, appearing in a play by Aeschylus and again in Shakespeare's King Lear and Antony and Cleopatra; the mosquito has a similar reputation.

== Overview ==
Insects play important roles in around one hundred novels and a hundred short stories in English literature. They are used to portray both positive and negative qualities, more usually negative, including entrapment, stinging, being rapacious, and swarming. They are common in fantasy and especially in science fiction, often as the earthly or alien villains. Detective novels sometimes use insects as unexpected murder weapons. A fly on the wall is used as a voyeur to tell erotic stories in R. Chopping's The Fly, and the anonymous Autobiography of a Flea. Franz Kafka made use of the strangeness of insect metamorphosis in his novella The Metamorphosis (German: Die Verwandlung), as have several authors since. Despite this, it has been argued that insects are underrepresented in literature in comparison to other classes of animals.

== Positive qualities ==
=== Industriousness and cooperation ===
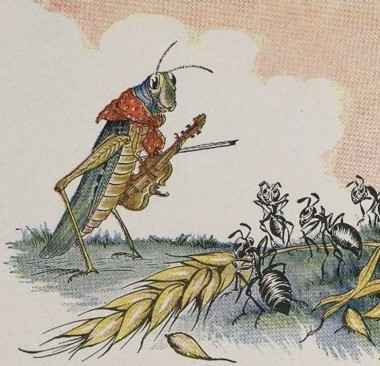
Aesop's ants: picture by Milo Winter, 1888–1956

Anthropomorphised ants have often been used in fables, children's stories, and religious texts to represent industriousness and cooperative effort. In the Book of Proverbs, ants are held up as a good example for humans for their hard work and cooperation. Aesop did the same in his fable "The Ant and the Grasshopper". Some modern authors have used ants to comment on the relationship between society and the individual, as with Robert Frost in his poem "Departmental" and T. H. White in his fantasy novel The Once and Future King.

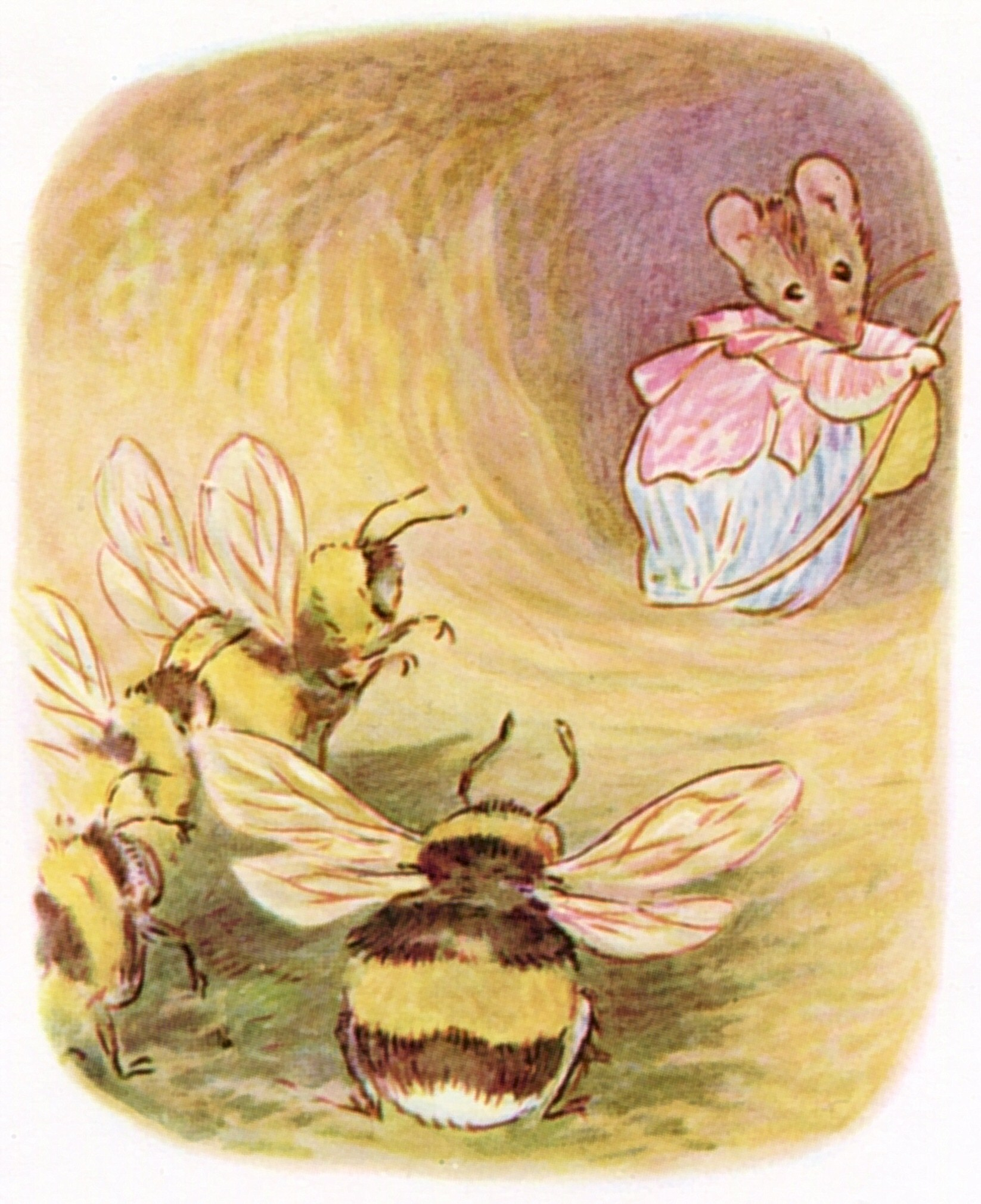
Beatrix Potter's illustration of Babbity Bumble in The Tale of Mrs Tittlemouse, 1910

Beatrix Potter's illustrated 1910 children's book The Tale of Mrs Tittlemouse features the busy bumblebee Babbity Bumble and her brood.

=== Harmony with nature ===
The poet W. B. Yeats wrote The Lake Isle of Innisfree (1888) with the honey bee couplet "Nine bean rows will I have there, a hive for the honey bee, / And live alone in the bee loud glade", while he was living in Bedford Park, London.

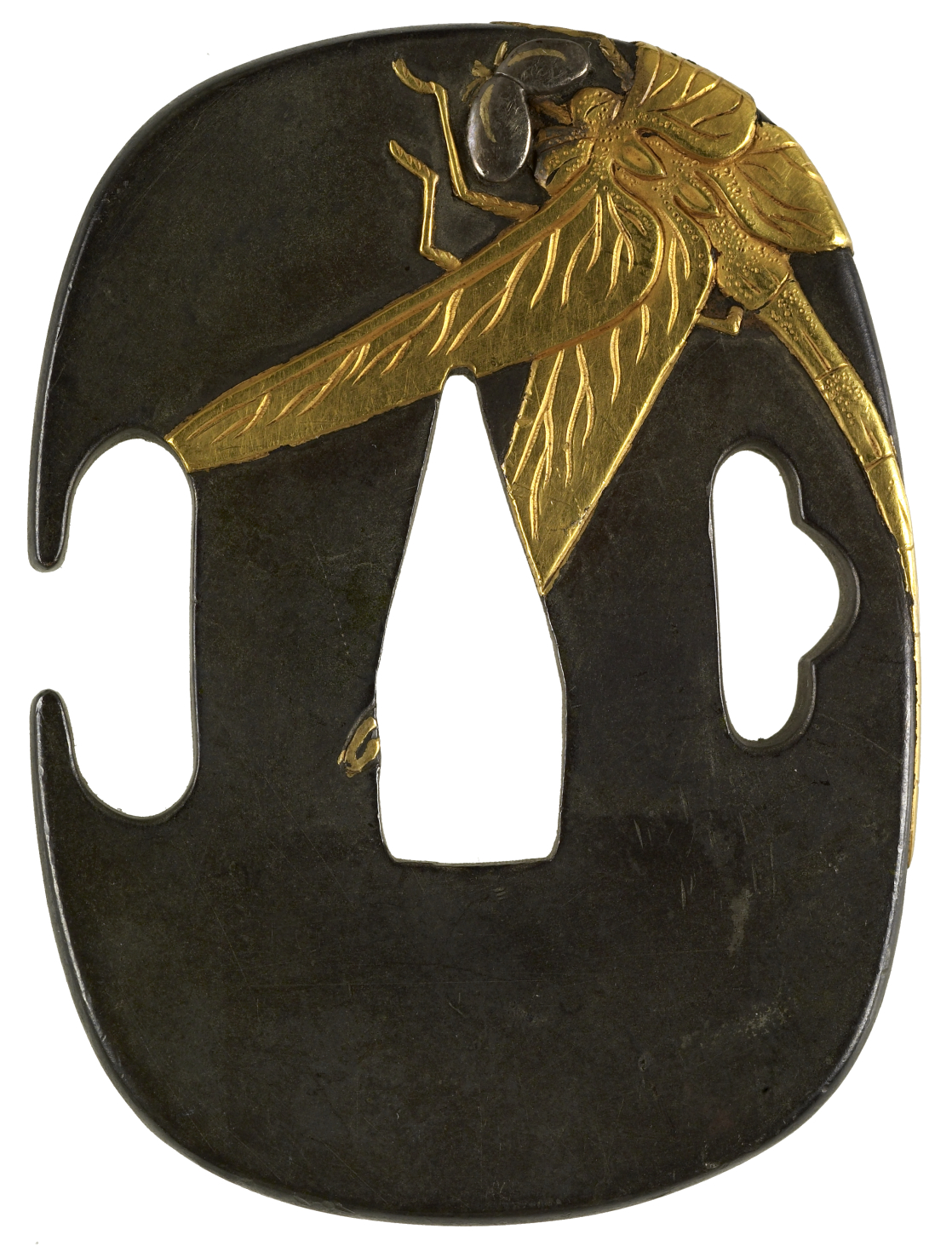
Japanese tsuba with a dragonfly, 1931: Shibuichi with gold and silver, Walters Art Museum

Lafcadio Hearn wrote in his 1901 book A Japanese Miscellany that Japanese poets had created dragonfly haiku "almost as numerous as are the dragonflies themselves in the early autumn." The poet Matsuo Bashō (1644–1694) wrote haiku such as "Crimson pepper pod / add two pairs of wings, and look / darting dragonfly", relating the autumn season to the dragonfly. Hori Bakusui (1718–1783) similarly wrote "Dyed he is with the / Colour of autumnal days, / O red dragonfly."

The poet Alfred, Lord Tennyson described a dragonfly splitting its old skin and emerging shining metallic blue like "sapphire mail" in his 1842 poem "The Two Voices", with the lines "An inner impulse rent the veil / Of his old husk: from head to tail / Came out clear plates of sapphire mail."

The novelist H. E. Bates described the rapid, agile flight of dragonflies in his 1937 nonfiction book Down the River:

I saw, once, an endless procession, just over an area of water-lilies, of small sapphire dragonflies, a continuous play of blue gauze over the snowy flowers above the sun-glassy water. It was all confined, in true dragonfly fashion, to one small space. It was a continuous turning and returning, an endless darting, poising, striking and hovering, so swift that it was often lost in sunlight.

=== The spirit world ===
In the traditional Navajo religion, Big Fly is an important spirit being.

Lafcadio Hearn's essay Butterflies analyses the treatment of the butterfly in Japanese literature, both prose and poetry. He notes that these often allude to Chinese tales, such as of the young woman that the butterflies took to be a flower. Among the brief 17-syllable Japanese Haiku poems about butterflies, of which he translates 22, one by the Haiku master Matsuo Bashō is said to suggest happiness in springtime: "Wake up! Wake up!—I will make thee my comrade, thou sleeping butterfly." Another compares the butterfly's shape to a Japanese silk upper-dress, the haori, "being taken off". A third says they look to be girls of "about seventeen or eighteen years old." Hearn retells, too, the old story of a man who dies after 50 years alone, having mourned his sweetheart Akiko daily all that time. As he dies, "a very large white butterfly entered the room, and perched upon the sick man's pillow." The man smiles in death. "Then it must have been Akiko!", says an old woman who knew him.

== Negative qualities ==
=== Strange and alien beings ===
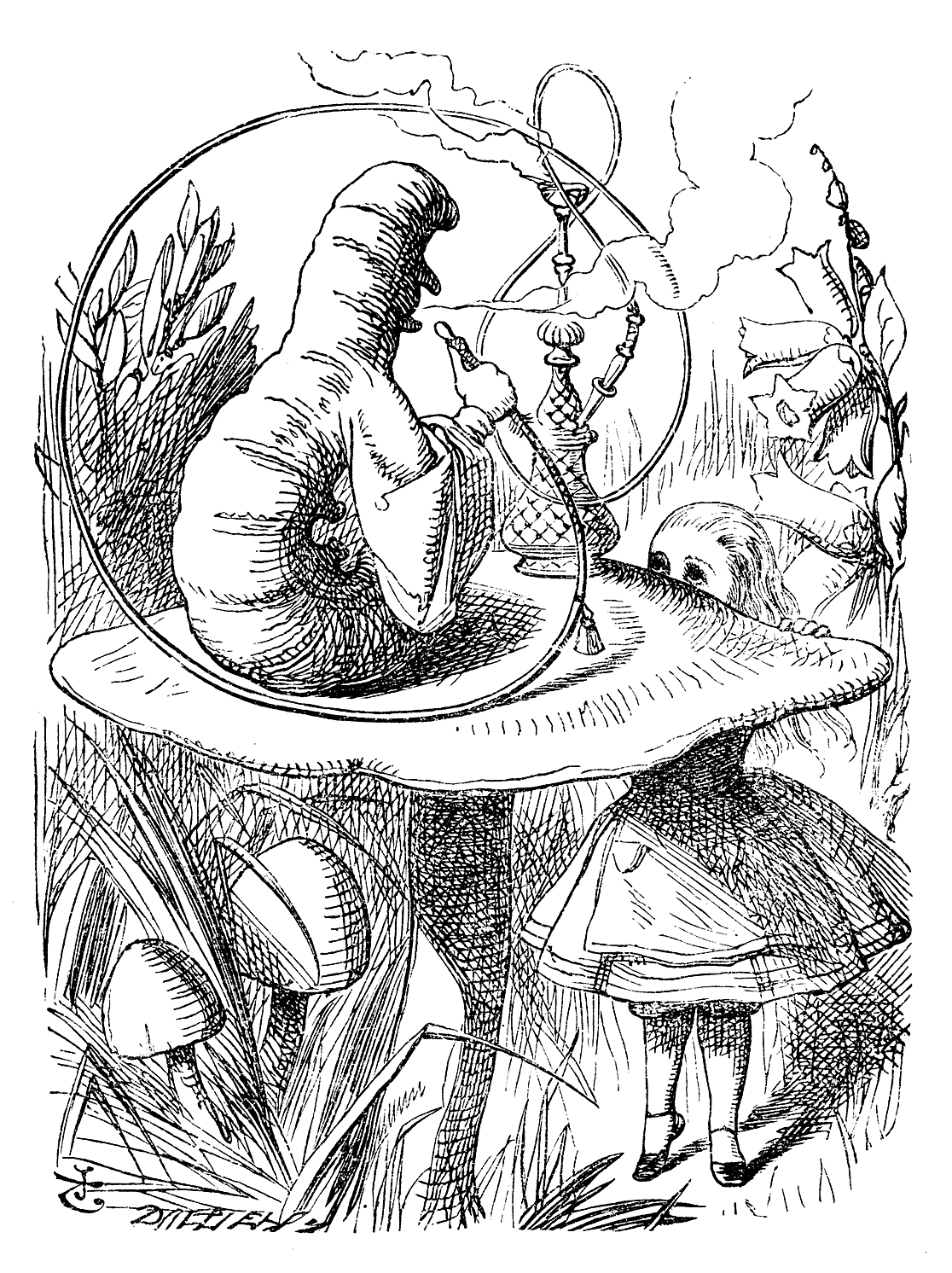
Alice meets the caterpillar. Illustration by Sir John Tenniel in Lewis Carroll's Alice in Wonderland, c. 1865

Insects have repeatedly been used in literature as strange or alien beings. Sir John Tenniel drew a famous illustration of Alice meeting a caterpillar for Lewis Carroll's Alice in Wonderland, c. 1865. The caterpillar is seated on a toadstool and is smoking a hookah pipe; the image can be read as showing either the forelegs of the larva, or as suggesting a face with protruding nose and chin. H.G. Wells wrote about intelligent ants destroying human settlements in Brazil and threatening human civilization in his 1905 science-fiction short story, The Empire of the Ants. He made use of giant wasps in his 1904 novel The Food of the Gods and How It Came to Earth:

It flew, he is convinced, within a yard of him, struck the ground, rose again, came down again perhaps thirty yards away, and rolled over with its body wriggling and its sting stabbing out and back in its last agony. He emptied both barrels into it before he ventured to go near. When he came to measure the thing, he found it was twenty-seven and a half inches across its open wings, and its sting was three inches long. ... The day after, a cyclist riding, feet up, down the hill between Sevenoaks and Tonbridge, very narrowly missed running over a second of these giants that was crawling across the roadway.

In 1917 the ghost story author Algernon Blackwood wrote An Egyptian Hornet, about a beast at once alarming and beautiful: "From a distance he examined this intrusion of the devil. It was calm and very still. It was wonderfully made, both before and behind. Its wings were folded upon its terrible body. Long, sinuous things, pointed like temptation, barbed as well, stuck out of it. There was poison, and yet grace, in its exquisite presentment." The story contrasts the reactions to the threat of the churchman, the Reverend James Milligan, and the "depraved" Mr. Mullins.

The science fiction writer Eric Frank Russell's 1957 Wasp has its protagonist, James Mowry, as a "wasp" terrorist, a small but deadly Terran (human) force in the Sirian Empire's midst.

=== Greed ===
Devouring plagues of locusts are mentioned in literature throughout history. The Ancient Egyptians carved locusts on tombs in the period 2470 to 2220 BC, and a devastating plague is mentioned in the Book of Exodus in the Bible, as taking place in Egypt around 1300 BC. Plagues of locusts are also mentioned in the Quran.

Eric Carle's children's book The Very Hungry Caterpillar portrays the larva as an extraordinarily hungry animal.

=== Self-importance ===
The Impertinent Insect is a group of five fables, sometimes ascribed to Aesop, concerning an insect which may be a fly, gnat, or flea, and which puffs itself up to seem important.

=== Death and decay ===
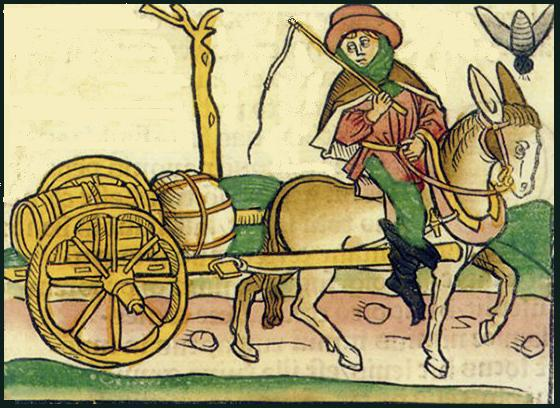
A woodprint of The fly and the mule from the 1464 Ulm edition of Steinhöwel's collection of Aesop's Fables. It is one of five versions of The Impertinent Insect.

In the Biblical fourth plague of Egypt, flies represent death and decay. Myiagros was a god in Greek mythology who chased away flies during the sacrifices to Zeus and Athena; Zeus sent a fly to bite Pegasus, causing Bellerophon to fall back to Earth when he attempted to ride the winged steed to Mount Olympus.

Emily Dickinson's 1855 poem "I Heard a Fly Buzz When I Died" refers to flies in the context of death. In William Golding's 1954 novel Lord of the Flies, the fly is a symbol of the children involved.

=== Improvidence ===
One of Aesop's Fables, the tale of The Ant and the Grasshopper. The ant works hard all summer, while the grasshopper plays. In winter, the ant is ready but the improvident grasshopper starves. Somerset Maugham's short story "The Ant and the Grasshopper" explores the fable's symbolism via complex framing.

=== Unfaithfulness ===
Other human weaknesses besides improvidence have become identified with the grasshopper's behaviour. So an unfaithful woman (hopping from man to man) is "a grasshopper" (Russian: Попрыгунья, romanized: Poprygunya), an 1892 short story by Anton Chekhov, and in the films called The Grasshopper by Samson Samsonov (1955) and Jerry Paris (1970) based on that story.

=== Torment ===
The Ancient Greek playwright Aeschylus has a gadfly pursue and torment Io, a maiden associated with the moon, watched constantly by the eyes of the herdsman Argus, associated with all the stars: "Io: Ah! Hah! Again the prick, the stab of gadfly-sting! O earth, earth, hide, the hollow shape—Argus—that evil thing—the hundred-eyed." William Shakespeare, inspired by Aeschylus, has Tom o'Bedlam in King Lear, "Whom the foul fiend hath led through fire and through flame, through ford and whirlpool, o'er bog and quagmire", driven mad by the constant pursuit. In Antony and Cleopatra, Shakespeare likens Cleopatra's hasty departure from the Actium battlefield to that of a cow chased by a gadfly: "The breeze [gadfly] upon her, like a cow in June / hoists sail and flies", where "June" may allude not only to the month but also to the goddess Juno who torments Io; and the cow in turn may allude to Io, who is changed into a cow in Ovid's Metamorphoses.

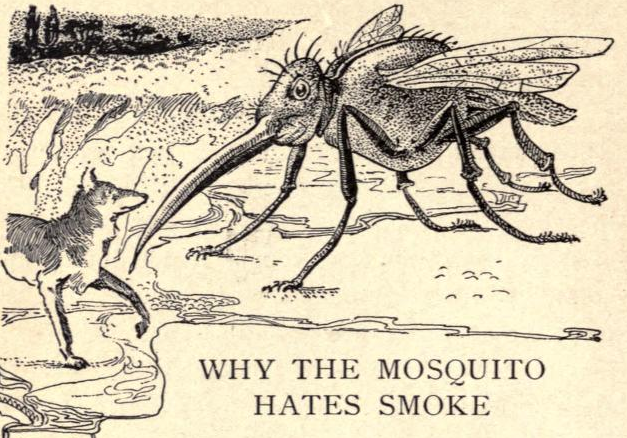
Illustration by J.W. Ferguson Kennedy, 1905

The physician and naturalist Thomas Muffet wrote that the horse-fly "carries before him a very hard, stiff, and well-compacted sting, (Note: Muffet means the fly's biting mouthparts.) with which he strikes through the Oxe his hide; he is in fashion like a great Fly, and forces the beasts for fear of him only to stand up to the belly in water, or else to betake themselves to wood sides, cool shades, and places where the wind blowes through." The "Blue Tail Fly" in the eponymous song was probably the mourning horsefly (Tabanus atratus), a tabanid with a blue-black abdomen common to the southeastern United States.

Mosquitoes have been part of oral lore, and even of told jokes, and from folklore pronouncing the origin of the mosquito, and depicting its relation to a "blood-sucking monster" contemporary work has been written and illustrated. The Tlingit legend "How Mosquitoes Came to Be" expresses the never-ending torment inflicted by the mosquito.

== Sources ==
- Hearn, Lafcadio (2015). Insect Literature (Limited (300 copies) ed.). Dublin: Swan River Press. ISBN 978-1-78380-009-4.
- Morris, Brian (2006) [2004]. Cultural Entomology. Berg. pp. 181–216. ISBN 978-1-84520-949-0.
