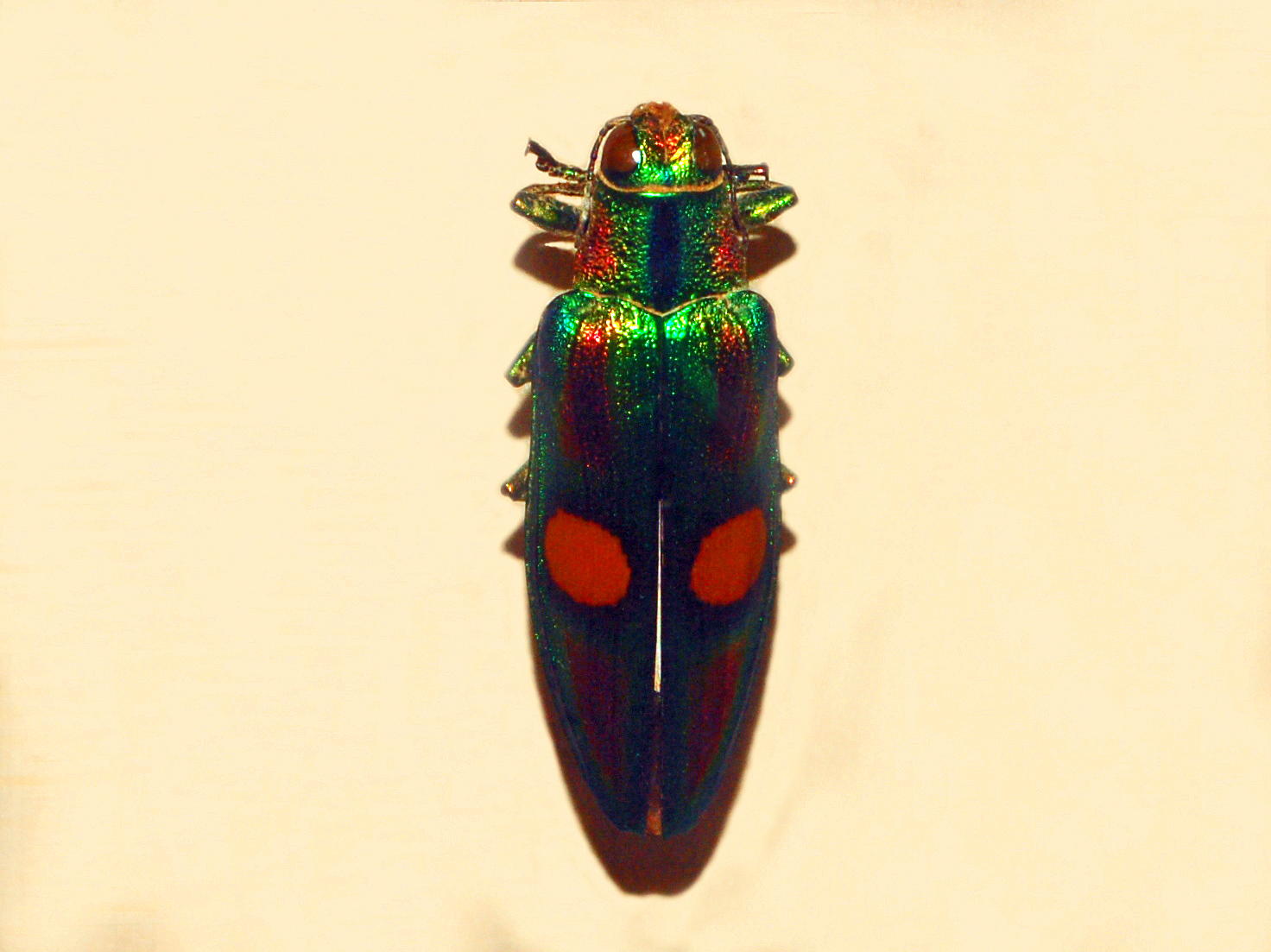
- Chrysochroa ocellata from Andaman Islands

Scientific classification
- Kingdom: Animalia
- Phylum: Arthropoda
- Clade: Pancrustacea
- Class: Insecta
- Order: Coleoptera
- Suborder: Polyphaga
- Infraorder: Elateriformia
- Family: Buprestidae
- Genus: Chrysochroa
- Species: C. ocellata

Binomial name
- Chrysochroa ocellata (Fabricius, 1775)
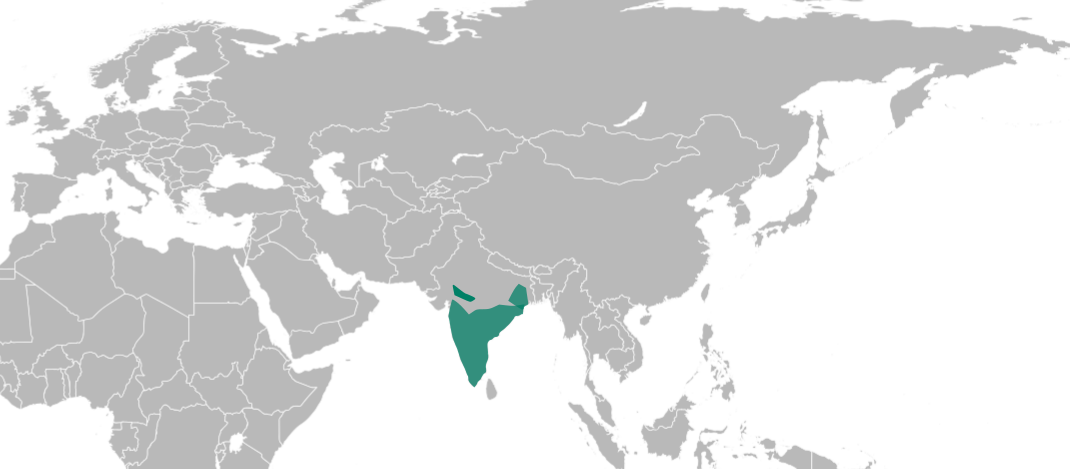

= Chrysochroa ocellata =

Species of beetle

Chrysochroa ocellata is a beetle of the Buprestidae family.

== Description ==
Chrysochroa ocellata can reach a length of about 20 millimetres (0.79 in). Elytra and pronotum are metallic green. Elytra have a longitudinal bright reddish band interrupted by a broad rounded yellow-orange spot in the middle. The legs are bright green.

== Distribution ==
These beetles can be found in India.

== Subspecies ==
- Chrysochroa ocellata fulgens (DeGeer, 1778)
- Chrysochroa ocellata ocellata (Fabricius, 1775)
