= Nova Central School District =

Former school district in Newfoundland and Labrador, Canada

Nova Central School District was a school district headquartered in Gander in the Canadian province of Newfoundland and Labrador. The district had 66 schools located in 50 different communities, and served about 13,000 students, including a significant rural population. The District was formed by the merger of the Lewisporte-Gander and Baie Verte-Central-Connaigre school boards in 2004. The largest school in the district was Gander Academy. The district was replaced by the Newfoundland and Labrador English School District upon provincial amalgamation in 2013.

== Schools ==
- Avoca Collegiate in Badger
- Baie Verte Collegiate in Baie Verte
- Baie Verte Academy in Baie Verte
- Bay d'Espoir Academy in Milltown
- Bayview Primary in Nipper's Harbour
- Botwood Collegiate in Botwood
- Brian Peckford Elementary in Triton
- Centreville Academy in Centreville-Wareham
- Charlottetown Primary in Charlottetown
- Cape John Collegiate in La Scie
- Cottrells Cove Academy in Cottrell's Cove
- Deckwood Primary in Woodstock
- Dorset Collegiate in Pilley's Island
- Exploits Valley Intermediate in Grand Falls-Windsor
- Exploits Valley High in Grand Falls-Windsor
- Fitzgerald Academy in English Harbour West
- Fogo Island Central Academy in Fogo Island Central
- Gander Academy in Gander
- Gander Collegiate in Gander
- Gill Memorial Academy in Musgrave Harbour
- Glovertown Academy in Glovertown
- Green Bay South Academy in Robert's Arm
- Greenwood Academy in Campbellton
- Helen Tulk Elementary in Bishop's Falls
- Heritage Academy in Greens Pond
- Hillside Elementary in La Scie
- Hillview Academy in Norris Arm South
- H.L. Strong Academy in Little Bay Islands
- Holy Cross School in Eastport
- Indian River High School in Springdale
- Indian River Academy in Springdale
- J.M. Olds Collegiate in Twillingate
- Jane Collins Academy in Hare Bay
- John Watlkins Academy in Hermitage
- King Academy in Harbour Breton
- Lakewood Academy in Glenwood
- Lester Pearson Memorial High in Wesleyville
- Lewisporte Academy in Lewisporte
- Lewisporte Collegiate in Lewisporte
- Lewisporte Intermediate in Lewisporte
- Lumsden School Complex in Lumsden
- Lakeside Academy in Buchans
- Leading Tickles Elementary in Leading Tickles
- Leo Burke Academy in Bishop's Falls
- Long Island Academy in Beaumont
- Memorial Academy in Wesleyville
- Memorial Academy in Botwood
- M.S.B. Regional Academy in Middle Arm
- Millcrest Academy in Grand Falls-Windsor
- New World Island Academy in Summerford
- Phoenix Academy in Carmanville
- Point Leamington Academy in Point Leamington
- Riverwood Academy in Wings Point
- Sandstone Academy in Ladle Cove
- Smallwood Academy in Gambo
- St. Gabriel's All-Grade in St. Brendans
- St. Paul's Intermediate in Gander
- St. Stephen's All-Grade in Rencontre East
- St. Peter's All-Grade in McCallum
- St. Peter's Academy in Westport
- St. Joseph's Elementary in Harbour Breton
- Sprucewood Academy in Grand Falls-Windsor
- Twillingate Island Elementary in Twillingate
- Victoria Academy in Gaultois
- Valmont Academy in King's Point
- William Mercer Academy in Dover
- Woodland Primary in Grand Falls-Windsor
