= Gander =

Gander may refer to:

== Animals ==
- Gander (goose), an adult male goose
- Gander (dog), a Newfoundland dog, recipient of the Dickin Medal for bravery
- Gander (horse), a thoroughbred race horse

== Places ==
=== Canada ===
- Gander, Newfoundland and Labrador, a town in Canada
  - Gander (electoral district), a provincial electoral district
  - Gander Academy, an elementary school in Gander
  - Gander Collegiate, a high school in Gander
  - Gander International Airport, a major airport in Newfoundland and Labrador
  - CFB Gander, also known as 9 Wing Gander, a Canadian air force base co-located at Gander International Airport
- Gander Bay, Newfoundland
- Gander Lake, Newfoundland
- Gander River, Newfoundland
- Gander terrane, a continental fragment in Newfoundland
- Gander Island, part of the Moore Islands, British Columbia

=== France/Luxembourg ===
- Gander (Moselle), a small river

== People ==
- Gander (surname)
- Monty Stratton (1912-1982), nicknamed "Gander", Major League Baseball pitcher

== Fictional characters ==
- Gladstone Gander, a Walt Disney fictional character created by cartoonist Carl Barks
- Goosetave Gander, a fictional character of the Scrooge McDuck Universe, Gladstone Gander's father
- Richard Gander, in the 1972 British sitcom Alcock and Gander

== Other uses ==
- Gander Stakes, an ungraded stakes race for New York bred Thoroughbred race horses
- Kokusai Ku-8, a 1940s Japanese light transport monoplane codenamed Gander by the Allies
- USS Gander, a Danube class starship in the science fiction franchise Star Trek

== See also ==
- Gander Mountain, a hunting and fishing store
- Nicolae Dobrin (1947–2007), Romanian footballer nicknamed Gâscanul ("The Gander")
- Ganda (disambiguation)
