= Eastern School District of Newfoundland and Labrador =

Former school district in Newfoundland and Labrador, Canada

The Eastern School District of Newfoundland and Labrador (ESDNL) was the de facto school board for the eastern portion of the island of Newfoundland, in the Canadian province of Newfoundland and Labrador. Its headquarters was in St. John's and there were regional offices in Spaniard's Bay, Burin and Clarenville. The district served approximately 40,000 students with 4,200 staff and teachers. It was amalgamated in 2013 into the Newfoundland and Labrador English School District.

The last CEO/Director of Education was Dr. Bruce Vey, who was appointed in October 2012. Previous directors include Ford Rice, Darrin Pike, who was appointed Deputy Minister of the Department of Education in 2009, and Dr. Darin King, who joined the district in 2004 and departed to enter provincial politics where he served as Minister of Education.

== Schools ==
The Eastern School District managed 119 schools in four regions, including the following high schools and schools with school grades:

Avalon East Regional Schools

- Mary Queen of the World Elementary School
- Baltimore School Complex
- Bishops College
- Booth Memorial High School
- East Point Elementary
- Gonzaga Regional High School
- Holy Heart of Mary High School
- Holy Spirit High School
- Holy Trinity High School
- Janeway Hospital School
- Mobile Central High School
- Mount Pearl Senior High School
- O'Donel High School
- Prince of Wales Collegiate
- Queen Elizabeth Regional High School
- St. Anne's Academy
- St. Kevin's High School
- St. Michael's High School

Avalon West Regional Schools

- Ascension Collegiate
- Baccalieu Collegiate
- Carbonear Collegiate
- Crescent Collegiate

Burin Regional Schools

- Christ the King School (Dunne Memorial Academy)
- Fatima Academy
- Laval High School
- Roncalli Central High School
- St. Catherine's Academy
- Christ the King School
- Fortune Bay Academy
- Holy Name of Mary
- John Burke High School
- Marystown Central High
- St. Joseph's Academy
- St. Joseph's All Grade
- St. Lawrence Academy

Vista Regional Schools (including Clarenville and Bonavista Peninsula):

- Bishop White School
- Clarenville High School
- Discovery Collegiate
- Heritage Collegiate
- Random Island Academy
- Southwest Arm Academy
- St. Mark's School
- Swift Current Academy
- Tricentia Academy
