= Newfoundland and Labrador English School District =

English-language school district for all of Newfoundland and Labrador, Canada

NLESD logo.

NLSchools (formally known as Newfoundland & Labrador English School District as of 2024) is the school board overseeing all English-language primary and secondary education in the Canadian province of Newfoundland and Labrador. In June 2018, NLESD held jurisdiction over 256 schools serving more than 65,000 students across the province. It was created in 2013 as part of the amalgamation of all provincial school boards into an English-language and a French-language board. There had previously been four English-language school boards in the province: the Nova Central School District, Eastern School District, Labrador School Board, and Western School Board.

== List of Schools ==
=== Former Eastern School District ===
Avalon East Regional Schools

- Mary Queen of the World Elementary School
- Baltimore School Complex
- Bishops College
- Booth Memorial High School
- Gonzaga Regional High School
- Holy Heart of Mary High School
- Holy Spirit High School
- Holy Trinity High School
- Janeway Hospital School
- Mobile Central High School
- Mount Pearl Senior High School
- O'Donel High School
- Prince of Wales Collegiate
- Queen Elizabeth Regional High School
- St. Anne's Academy
- St. Kevin's High School
- St. Michael's High School

Avalon West Regional Schools

- Ascension Collegiate
- Baccalieu Collegiate
- Carbonear Collegiate
- Crescent Collegiate

Burin Regional Schools

- Christ the King School (Dunne Memorial Academy)
- Fatima Academy
- Laval High School
- Roncalli Central High School
- St. Catherine's Academy
- Christ the King School
- Fortune Bay Academy
- Holy Name of Mary
- John Burke High School
- Marystown Central High
- St. Joseph's Academy
- St. Joseph's All Grade
- St. Lawrence Academy

Vista Regional Schools

(including Clarenville and Bonavista Peninsula):

- Bishop White School
- Clarenville High School
- Discovery Collegiate
- Heritage Collegiate
- Random Island Academy
- Southwest Arm Academy
- St. Mark's School
- Swift Current Academy
- Tricentia Academy

=== Former Nova Central School District ===
- Avoca Collegiate in Badger
- Baie Verte Collegiate in Baie Verte
- Baie Verte Academy in Baie Verte
- Bay d'Espoir Academy in St. Alban's
- Bayview Primary in Nipper's Harbour
- Botwood Collegiate in Botwood
- Brian Peckford Elementary in Triton
- Centreville Academy in Centreville-Wareham
- Charlottetown Primary in Charlottetown
- Cape John Collegiate in La Scie
- Cottrells Cove Academy in Cottrell's Cove
- Deckwood Primary in Woodstock
- Dorset Collegiate in Pilley's Island
- Exploits Valley Intermediate in Grand Falls-Windsor
- Exploits Valley High in Grand Falls-Windsor
- Fitzgerald Academy in English Harbour West
- Fogo Island Central Academy in Fogo Island Central
- Gander Academy in Gander
- Gander Collegiate in Gander
- Gander Elementary in Gander
- Gill Memorial Academy in Musgrave Harbour
- Glovertown Academy in Glovertown
- Green Bay South Academy in Robert's Arm
- Greenwood Academy in Campbellton
- Helen Tulk Elementary in Bishop's Falls
- Heritage Academy in Greens Pond
- Hillside Elementary in La Scie
- Hillview Academy in Norris Arm South
- H.L. Strong Academy in Little Bay Islands
- Holy Cross School in Eastport
- Indian River High School in Springdale
- Indian River Academy in Springdale
- J.M. Olds Collegiate in Twillingate
- Jane Collins Academy in Hare Bay
- John Watlkins Academy in Hermitage
- King Academy in Harbour Breton
- Lakewood Academy in Glenwood
- Lester Pearson Memorial High in Wesleyville
- Lewisporte Academy in Lewisporte
- Lewisporte Collegiate in Lewisporte
- Lewisporte Intermediate in Lewisporte
- Lumsden School Complex in Lumsden
- Lakeside Academy in Buchans
- Leading Tickles Elementary in Leading Tickles
- Leo Burke Academy in Bishop's Falls
- Long Island Academy in Beaumont
- Memorial Academy in Wesleyville
- Memorial Academy in Botwood
- M.S.B. Regional Academy in Middle Arm
- Millcrest Academy in Grand Falls-Windsor
- New World Island Academy in Summerford
- Phoenix Academy in Carmanville
- Point Leamington Academy in Point Leamington
- Riverwood Academy in Wings Point
- Sandstone Academy in Ladle Cove
- Smallwood Academy in Gambo
- St. Gabriel's All-Grade in St. Brendans
- St. Paul's Intermediate in Gander
- St. Stephen's All-Grade in Rencontre East
- St. Peter's All-Grade in McCallum
- St. Peter's Academy in Westport
- St. Joseph's Elementary in Harbour Breton
- Sprucewood Academy in Grand Falls-Windsor
- Twillingate Island Elementary in Twillingate
- Victoria Academy in Gaultois
- Valmont Academy in King's Point
- William Mercer Academy in Dover
- Woodland Primary in Grand Falls-Windsor

=== Former Western School Board ===
- Bayview Academy
