= Ganda =

Ganda may refer to:

== Places ==
- Ganda, Angola
- Ganda, Tibet, China
- Ganda, the ancient Latin name of Ghent, a city in Belgium
- Ganda, a settlement in Kilifi County, Kenya

== Other uses ==
- Baganda or Ganda, a people of Uganda
  - Luganda or Ganda language, a language of Uganda
- Ganda and "Ganda", a 2018 album and song by GreatGuys
- Ganda (caste), a caste in India

== People ==
- Ganda (Chandela dynasty), 11th century ruler in central India
- Ganda (music producer), Puerto Rican music producer; see Baby Rasta & Gringo
- Vice Ganda (born 1976), Filipino comedian, television presenter, and actor

=== Given name ===
- Ganda Singh Datt (1830–1903), decorated soldier in the British Indian Army
- Ganda Singh Dhillon (died 1776), famous royal Sikh warrior

=== Surname ===
- Joseph Ganda (bishop) (born 1932), Archbishop of the Archdiocese of Freetown and Bo
- Joseph Ganda (footballer) (born 1997), Israeli footballer
- Matthew Ganda (born 1990), better known by his stage name Kainawa, British recording artist and record producer
- Oumarou Ganda (1935–1981), Nigerien director and actor

== See also ==
- Gander (disambiguation)
- Uganda, a landlocked country in East Africa
