= Butiko Clan =

The Butiko clan (Mushrooms clan), headed by Omutaka Ggunju Matia Kawere, and is one of the clans in Buganda or Central Uganda. The members of the Butiko clan are called Ab'obutiko (Singular: Ow'obutiko). The members of this clan are Baganda people and speak Luganda language.

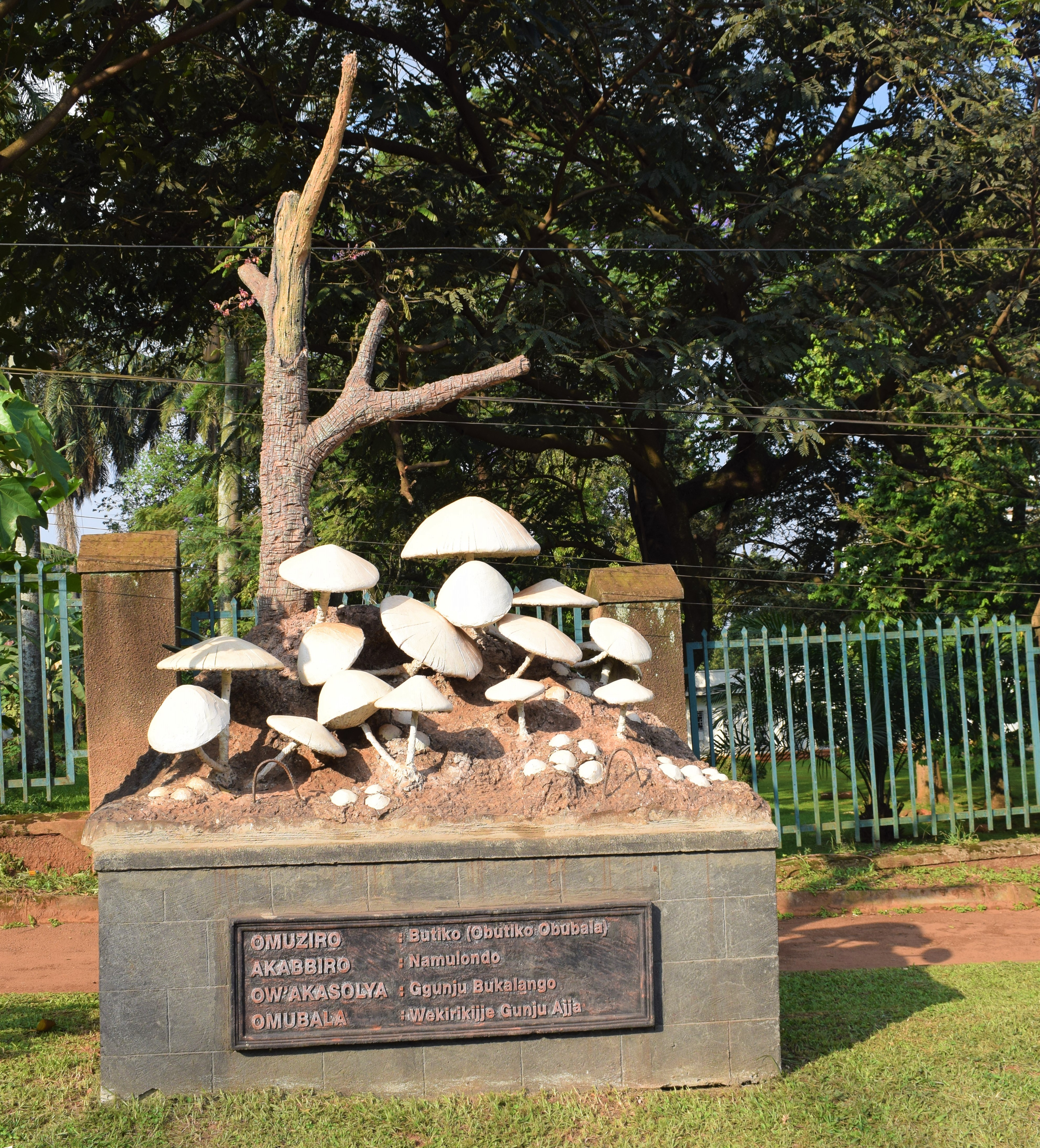
Mushrooms, Obutiko in Luganda

== Titles ==
Ggunju is the title of the head of the Butiko clan. Omutaka is a general title for each head of a clan.

== Clan totems ==
The primary totem, Omuziro, is the Mushrooms. The secondary totem, akabbiro, is a (Nnamulondo). A member of the Butiko clan is forbidden from eating or injuring Mushrooms or even toadstools.

== Structure ==
=== The Kabaka (Ssaabataka) ===
The Kabaka of Buganda is the head of the clan structure and the heads of the clans, the Bataka (plural form of Omutaka)) are under him.

=== Clan Head (Ow'Akasolya) ===
The head of the Kasolya (roof) is Omutaka Ggunju.

=== Clan Seat (Obutaka) ===
The location of the clan seat (Obutaka) is in Bukalango, Busiro, Wakiso District, Uganda.

=== Clan motto (Omubala) ===
The clan's motto (omubala) or slogans (emibala) are:

1. Weekirikite, Ggunju ajja
2. Gabolokota teggwa nte.

== Duties and Responsibility at Palace ==
The members of the Butiko clan were the Kabaka's Blacksmiths.

== Clan Names (Mannya g'ekika) ==
The surnames or last names of people belonging to this clan vary depending on one's biological gender (Male or Female). Some of the names are common to all members of the clan but some are more commonly used in specific units (Essiga) of the clan. In fact, some of the names that a particular Ssiga uses may have come from a different clan, for instance due to Okubbula (i.e naming someone after a favorite or a deceased person who was dear to them).

=== Boys' Names ===
Some boys' names belonging to this clan are:

1. Balinnya
2. Bbirikadde
3. Ddibya
4. Kabu
5. Kabuusu
6. Kagombe
7. Kasirye
8. Katimbo
9. Kawere
10. Kisuule
11. Kyazze
12. Lumala
13. Mubiru

=== Girls' Names ===
Some girls' names belonging to this clan are:

1. Nnabagereka (or Nabagereka)
2. Nnajjuka (or Najjuka)
3. Nnakyagaba (or Nakyagaba)
4. Nnakyazze (or Nakyazze)
5. Nnalugunju (or Nnalugunju)
6. Nnamberenge (or Namberenge)
7. Nnamulondo (or Namulondo)
8. Nnannoni (or Nannoni)
9. Nnakakaawa (or Nakakaawa)

== Famous members of the clan ==
1. Brigadier General Augustine Kyazze a senior military officer in the Uganda People's Defence Forces.
2. The Late Thomas Kawere was a professional boxer and coach.
