= Gandel =

Gandel is a surname. Notable people with the surname include:

- John Gandel (born 1935), Australian businessman, property developer, and philanthropist
- Pauline Gandel, Australian philanthropist, wife of John

== See also ==
- Gander (surname)
- Handel (name)
- Mandel
