= Gangda =

Gangda may be:

- The Mandarin reading of the colloquial name for the University of Hong Kong
- 185535 Gangda, a minor planet
- A district in Junagadh, Gujarat, India with pin code 362560

== See also ==
- Ganda (disambiguation)
