= HSHS =

HSHS may refer to:

- Hamilton Southeastern High School, Fishers, Indiana, United States
- Helensvale State High School, Helensvale, Queensland, Australia
- Henry-Senachwine High School, Henry, Illinois, United States
- Highland Springs High School, Highland Springs, Virginia, United States
- Hinsdale South High School, Darien, Illinois, United States
- Holy Spirit High School (disambiguation)
- Holly Springs High School, Holly Springs, North Carolina, United States
- Hot Springs High School (Arkansas), Hot Springs, Arkansas, United States
- Hot Springs High School (Montana), Hot Springs, Montana, United States
- Hospital Sisters Health System, Springfield, Illinois, United States
