= Gandar (surname) =

Gandar is a surname. Notable people with the surname include:

- Laurence Gandar (1915–1998), South African journalist and newspaper editor
- Les Gandar (1919–1994), New Zealand politician
- Jacqueline Gandar (born 1994), French long-distance runner

== See also ==
- Gander (surname)
