= HTE =

HTE may refer to:

- Hatia railway station, in Jharkhand, India
- Happier Than Ever, a studio album by Billie Eilish
- High-temperature electrolysis
- Harvest Energy Trust, a Canadian oil and gas company
- Hatch End railway station, in London
- Helen Tulk Elementary, in Bishop's Falls, Newfoundland and Labrador, Canada
- High-throughput experimentation
- Hiller HTE, a helicopter
- Historical Thesaurus of English
- Horvitz–Thompson estimator
- Hydrogen telluride ion (HTe-)
