= Mmamba Gabunga Clan =

Luganda clan

The Mmamba Clan headed by Omutaka Gabunga is one of the original (indigenous) clans in Buganda or Central Uganda. The members of this clan are called Ab'emmamba ya Gabunga (Singular: Ow'emmamba ya Gabunga). The members of this clan are Baganda people and speak Luganda language.

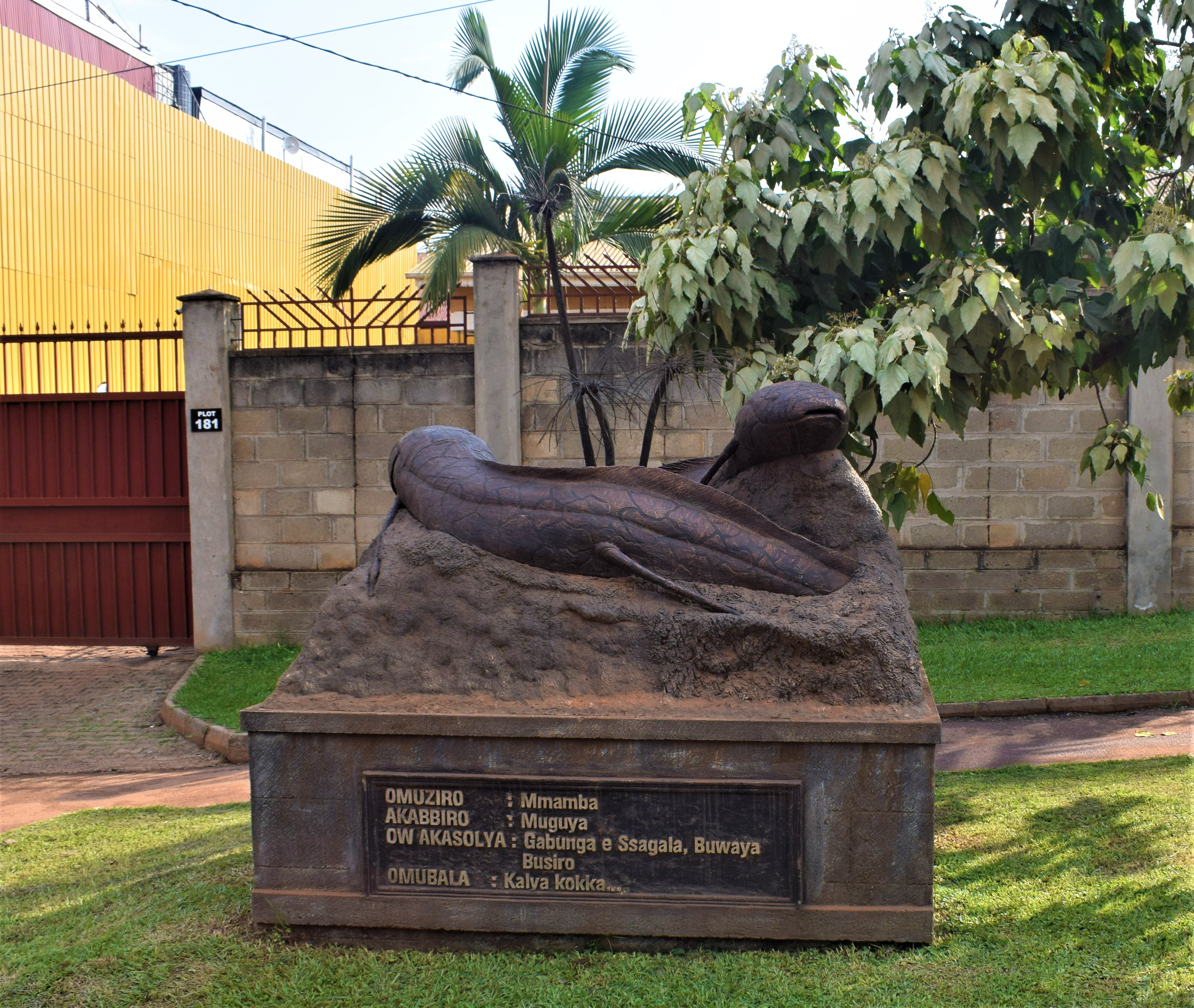
Lungfish, Emmamba in Luganda

== Titles ==
Gabunga or Ggabunga is the title of the head of the Mmamba Gabunga clan. Omutaka is a general title for each head of a clan. The current head of the clan is called Omutaka Gabunga Mubiru Zziikwa.

== Clan Totems ==
=== Primary Totem (Omuziro) ===
The primary totem (Omuziro) is Lungfish (Mmamba). It is taboo for a member of the Mmamba clan to eat or harm a Lungfish. This taboo does not apply to people who do not belong to this clan.

=== Secondary Totem (Akabbiro) ===
The secondary totem (akabbiro) is a young Lungfish (Omuguya).

== Structure ==
=== The Kabaka (Ssaabataka) ===
The Kabaka of Buganda is at the peak of the clan structure. So all the heads of the clans, the Bataka (plural form of Omutaka)) are under him. Hence his title, Ssaabataka.

=== Clan Head (Ow'Akasolya) ===
The head of the Kasolya (roof) is Omutaka Gabunga or sometimes written as Ggabunga.

=== Clan Seat (Obutaka) ===
The location of the clan seat (Obutaka) is in Ssagala-Buwaya, Busiro, Wakiso District, Uganda. .

=== Clan Motto (Omubala) ===
The clan's motto (omubala) or slogans (emibala) are:

1. Sirya mmamba, amazzi nnywa.
2. Bandaba kulya mpola ne bampita omukodo.
3. Sirya mmamba, amazzi nnywa.

("I don't eat Lungfish, I drink water. They see me eat slowly and call me selfish. I don't eat Lungfish, I drink water.", in English)

Other:

1. Sirya mmamba, amazzi nnywa.
2. Sirya mmamba amazzi nnywa.
3. Eno ssi mmamba nnamakaka.
4. Gwe ndisanga mu menvu n’ebikuta alibirya.
5. Akalya kokka ke keetenda obulyampola.

== Duties and Responsibility at Palace ==
The members of the Mmamba clan are responsible for the Kabaka's boats, ships, etc. In ancient times, the Gabunga headed Buganda Kingdom's Navy and was therefore equivalent to a Navy Admiral

== Clan Names ==
The surnames or lastnames of people belonging to this clan vary depending on one's biological gender (Male or Female). Some of the names are common to all members of the clan but some are more commonly used in specific units (Essiga) of the clan. In fact, some of the names that a particular Ssiga uses may have come from a different clan, for instance due to Okubbula (i.e naming someone after a favorite or a deceased person who was dear to them).

=== Male names ===
Some boys' names belonging to this clan are:

1. Buwule
2. Kayiwa
3. Kayizzi
4. Kifamba
5. Kizito
6. Luutu
7. Mayanja
8. Miiro
9. Mubiru
10. Mutebi
11. Nsubuga
12. Ssebalu
13. Ssemafumu (or Semafumu)
14. Ssembuya (or Sembuya)

15. Ssekatawa

=== Female names ===
Some girls' names belonging to this clan are:

1. Ndagire
2. Nnakifamba (or Nakifamba)
3. Nnalwoga (or Nalwoga)
4. Nnamayanja (or Namayanja)
5. Nnamiiro (or Namiiro)
6. Nnamubiru (or Namubiru)
7. Nnamutebi (or Namutebi)
8. Nnankya (or Nankya)
9. Nnansubuga (or Nansubuga)
10. Nnawoova (or Nawoova)
11. Nnakaye (or Nakaye)

== Amasiga Names ==
These are some of the names of the pillars (Amasiga) of the Mmamba Gabunga clan:

1. Essiga lya Balukake e Mpondwe, Mawokota
2. Essiga lya Bukulubwawadda e Kamunye, Busiro
3. Essiga lya Kagenda e Luwunga, Mawokota
4. Essiga lya Kasenke e Ntolomwe, Butambala
5. Essiga lya Kasiga e Bendegere, Busiro
6. Essiga lya Katenda e Zziba, Kyaggwe
7. Essiga lya Kibeevu e Ssi – Bukunja, Kyaggwe
8. Essiga lya Kirulu e Bwerenga, Busiro
9. Essiga lya Kisanje e Maggyo, Buvuma
10. Essiga lya Kisuze e Katwe Nakawuka, Busiro
11. Essiga lya Kivuba e Ndwasi, Bugaya, Buvuma District
12. Essiga lya Kiyaga e Ssanda, Busiro
13. Essiga lya Lugunju e Bbira, Ssingo
14. Essiga lya Lutimba e Kibulala, Ssingo
15. Essiga lya Luvule e Sserinya, Ssese
16. Essiga lya Mbajja e Namayamba, Bulemeezi
17. Essiga lya Miiro e Luubu, Mawokota
18. Essiga lya Miiro e Zzinga, Busiro
19. Essiga lya Minyanya e Mpatta, Buvuma
20. Essiga lya Mpumbu Mikalazi e Zziba - Buwaya, Busiro
21. Essiga lya Mugula e Buyiira, Ntebe, Busiro, Wakiso District
22. Essiga lya Mulinde e Mulajje, Kyaggwe
23. Essiga lya Mulinde e Namaliri, Kyaggwe
24. Essiga lya Munoga e Ntolomwe, Butambala
25. Essiga lya Namaabo e Kojja - Kagulu, Kyaggwe
26. Essiga lya Nyenje e Kkome, Kyaggwe
27. Essiga lya Sekibo e Kibanga, Ssese
28. Essiga lya Sempagama – Ssegwanga e Manyago, Busiro
29. Essiga lya Ssebawutu e Nsaamu, Mawokota
30. Essiga lya Ssenfuma e Kanyike, Mawokota
31. Essiga lya Ssennaku Katenda e Mayirikiti, Kyaggwe
32. Essiga lya Wabbuzi - Muzito e Bugaya, Buvuma
33. Essiga lya Wampona Mubiru Kirimungo e Busami, Busiro

== Famous members of the clan ==
1. The current Kabaka of Buganda, Mwenda Mutebi II is belongs to the Mmamba Gabunga Clan.
2. The Late industrialists, Christopher Sembuya and his younger brother, Henry Buwule who together founded the Sembule Group of Companies.
3. The late industrialist, Dr James Mulwana, who founded NICE House of Plastics, Jeza farm, Uganda batteries among other companies.
