= Ffumbe Clan =

Clan in Buganda or Central Uganda

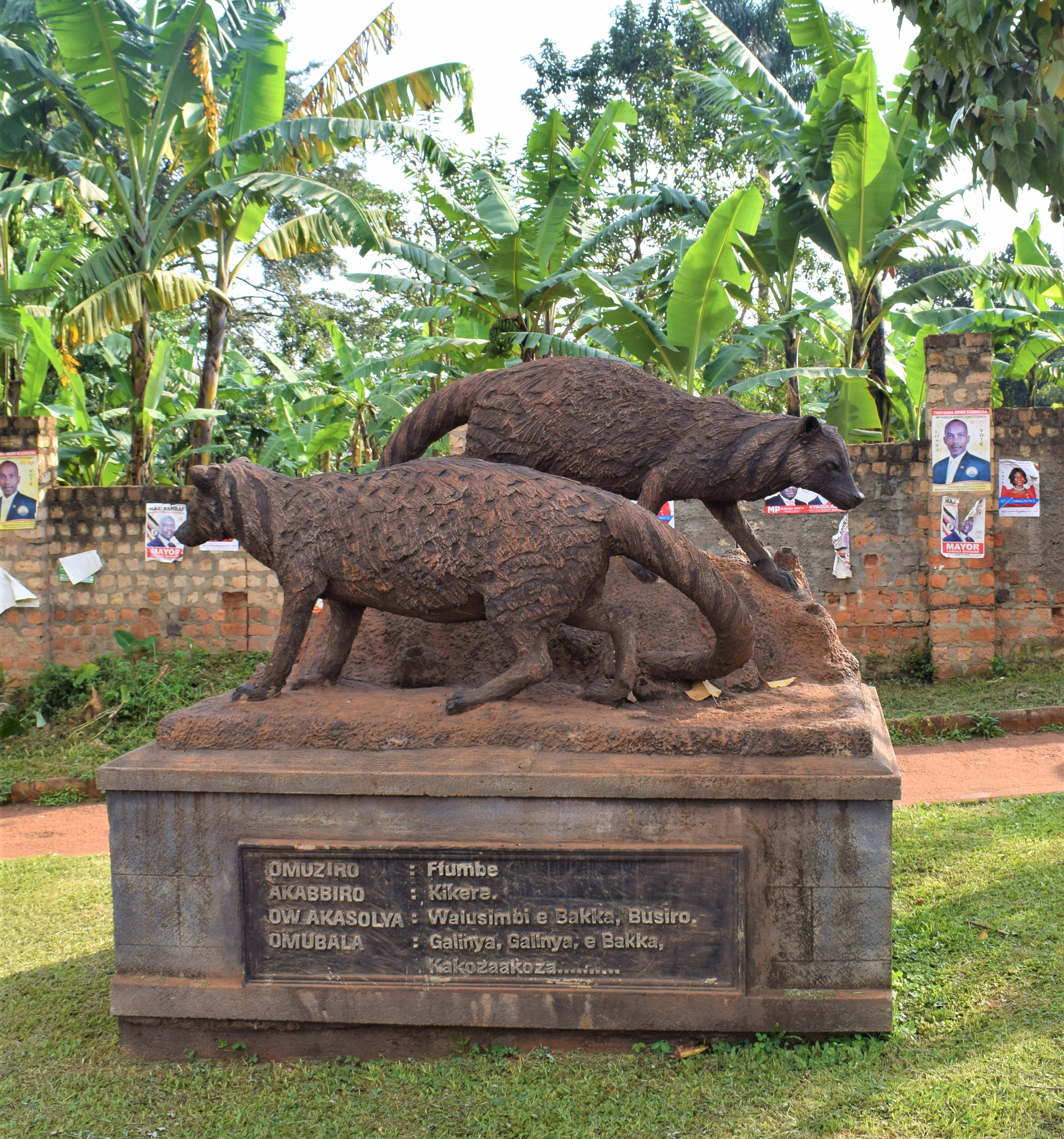
Sculpture representing the Ffumbe clan totem along the Royal Mile in Mengo, Kampala

The Ffumbe clan, headed by Omutaka Walusimbi, was one of the native (Nnansangwa) clans in Buganda or Central Uganda. The members of the Ffumbe clan are called Ab'effumbe (Singular: Ow'effumbe). The members of this clan are Baganda people and speak Luganda language.

== Titles ==
Walusimbi is the title of the head of the Ffumbe clan. Omutaka is a general title for each head of a clan.

== Clan totems ==
The primary totem, Omuziro, is the African civet. The secondary totem, akabbiro, is a frog (Kikere). A member of the Ffumbe clan is forbidden from eating or injuring the African Civet cat.

== Structure ==
=== The Kabaka (Ssaabataka) ===
The Kabaka of Buganda is the head of the clan structure and the heads of the clans, the Bataka (plural form of Omutaka)) are under him.

=== Clan Head (Ow'Akasolya) ===
The head of the Kasolya (roof) is Omutaka Walusimbi.

=== Clan Seat (Obutaka) ===
The location of the clan seat (Obutaka) is in Bakka, Busiro, Wakiso District, Uganda.

=== Clan motto (Omubala) ===
The clan's motto (omubala) or slogan (emibala) is:

1. Galinnya e Bakka.
2. E Bakka basengejja (mbu ebirungi tebiggwa Bakka)
3. Kasolo ki? Ffumbe
4. Ka muti gumu
5. Kakozaakoza alikoza mu lw'effumbe
6. Taatuuke Bumpi

== Duties and Responsibility at Palace ==
The members of the Ffumbe clan were the Kabaka's medicine men.

== Clan Names ("Mannya g'ekika") ==
The surnames or lastnames of people belonging to this clan vary depending on one's biological gender (Male or Female). Some of the names are common to all members of the clan but some are more commonly used in specific units (Essiga) of the clan. In fact, some of the names that a particular Ssiga uses may have come from a different clan, for instance due to Okubbula (i.e naming someone after a favorite or a deceased person who was dear to them).

=== Boys' Names ===
Some boys' names belonging to this clan are:

1. Bakka
2. Balimwezo
3. Ggolola
4. Kafumbe
5. Kajoba
6. Kalema
7. Kasolo
8. Kaweesa
9. Kigozi
10. Kimuli
11. Kisitu
12. Kiwendo
13. Lukomwa
14. Lubwama
15. Luzinda
16. Mabikke
17. Magunda
18. Mayambala
19. Mpanga
20. Musaazi
21. Nagaya
22. Nsobya
23. Ntege
24. Nvule
25. Senkaba
26. Sennoga
27. Ssebaggala
28. Ssebirumbi
29. Ssekadde
30. Ssempala
31. Ssengendo (or Sseŋŋendo)
32. Ssentumbwe
33. Ssewakuka
34. Walusimbi

=== Girls' Names ===
Some girls' names belonging to this clan are:

1. Nabaggala
2. Nabakka
3. Nabumba
4. Nabwami
5. Nakafumbe
6. Nakasi
7. Nakaweesa
8. Nakawungu
9. Nakigozi
10. Nakimuli
11. Nakindi
12. Nakku
13. Nalubwama
14. Nalumansi
15. Namammonde
16. Nampala
17. Namusaazi
18. Nandugga
19. Nangendo (or Naŋŋendo)
20. Nannozzi
21. Nantaba
22. Nanteza
23. Nnaabalamba
24. Nnakanyike
25. Nnanvule
26. Zaawedde

== Famous members of the clan ==
1. Former Katikkiro, Engineer John Baptist Walusimbi was a member of the Ffumbe clan.
2. Former Uganda Attorney General, the Late Professor Kiddu Makubuya.
3. Former Vice Chancellor, Makerere University, the Late Professor Livingstone Luboobi.
4. Former Prime minister, Uganda, the Late Apolo Nsibambi
