= Kalama Armoured Warfare Training School =

Armoured warfare training school in Uganda

Karama Armoured Warfare Training School
- Type: Armoured Warfare Training School
- Established: 2005
- Commandant: Brigadier; Francis Chemonges
- Undergraduates: 450
- Location: Kabamba, Mubende District, Uganda; 00°15′00″N 31°11′06″E
- Location within Uganda

The Karama Armoured Warfare Training School (KAWATS), is an Armoured Warfare Training School in Uganda, East Africa. Typically, graduates are commanders in the Uganda People's Defence Force. Other African countries also send their military personnel to the school for training.

== Location ==
The school is located in Kabamba, Mubende District, Central Uganda. This location, lies approximately 49 kilometres (30 mi), by road, southwest of Mubende, the nearest large town and the location of the district headquarters. Kabamba is located approximately 200 kilometres (120 mi), west of Kampala, the capital of Uganda and the largest city in that country. The coordinates of Kabamba are:0°15'00.0"N, 31°11'06.0"E (Latitude:0.2500; Longitude:31.1850).

== History ==
The school, built by Uganda's Ministry of Defence, at a cost of USh 1.8 billion (approximately US$730,000), was commissioned in February 2005. Medallion Engineering Limited, was the lead construction contractor. The school can accommodate approximately 450 students at one time. The current Commandant of KAWATS is Brigadier Francis Chemonges, formerly the Armoured Brigade Operations Officer.

== Notable staff ==
- Augustine Kyazze, at the rank of Brigadier General, served as Chief Instructor here
- Francis Chemonges, at the rank of Brigadier General, served as Commandant here in the 2010s.

== Notable alumni ==
- General Muhoozi Kainerugaba attended a course at this school earlier in his career.
- Major General Don Nabasa attended a course at this school earlier in his career.

== See also ==
- UPDF
- NRA
- UG Military Schools
