= Heart's Delight-Islington =

Canadian town

Coordinates: 47°46′00″N 53°28′30″W

- Town
- Seal
- Interactive map of Heart's Delight-Islington
- Country: Canada
- Province: Newfoundland and Labrador

Government
  - Mayor: Clayton Branton

Area
  - Total: 27.27 km^{2} (10.53 sq mi)

Population (2021)
  - Total: 646
  - Density: 24.7/km^{2} (64/sq mi)
- Time zone: UTC-3:30 (Newfoundland Time)
  - Summer (DST): UTC-2:30 (Newfoundland Daylight)
- Area code: 709
- Highways: Route 80

Heart's Delight-Islington is a town on the south side of Trinity Bay in the Canadian province of Newfoundland and Labrador, located on Newfoundland and Labrador Route 80. The Post Office was established in 1954. The first Postmistress was Maggie Chislett.

== Location ==
The town is located on Route 80 between Cavendish and Heart's Desire. It is about 15 minutes from the Pitcher's Pond Golf Course, and 30 minutes from Carbonear in Conception Bay.

== Etymology ==
There are several stories about the origin of the name "Heart's Delight." One is that it was named by a traveler who arrived in the cove and found his "Heart's Delight" there:

...the name Heart's Delight was given to create a favourable impression. Local tradition maintains that the community was given its name by weary travellers who were "delighted" by the beauty of the place. The harbour of Heart's Delight is also said to resemble the shape of a heart.

Another theory says that Heart's Delight and the communities of Heart's Desire and Heart's Content were named after fishing vessels, the Heart's Delight, the Heart's Desire and the Heart's Content, that fished out of the surrounding harbour during the fishery in the 17th and 18th centuries.

== History ==
Heart's Delight was settled in the late 18th century. The earliest reference to Heart's Delight in the Trinity parish records is the birth of Elizabeth Wolfrey, daughter of William and Elizabeth, in 1785. The first settler is believed to have been a man named Bryant, and the first official Census in 1836 recorded a population at 167, 165 Protestant Dissenters and two Roman Catholics.

In 1887, the population was recorded at 357, which included 60 married couples, 6 widowers, 6 widows, and 4 orphans.

The font in the Anglican church was donated by the vicar of Kingskerswell, Devon, England, in about 1893.

Construction of two new concrete bridges in the community was undertaken in 1963.

== Demographics ==
In the 2021 Census of Population conducted by Statistics Canada, Heart's Delight-Islington had a population of 646 living in 315 of its 427 total private dwellings, a change of −4.2% from its 2016 population of 674. With a land area of 26.95 km^{2} (10.41 sq mi), it had a population density of 24.0/km^{2} (62.1/sq mi) in 2021.

== Trivia ==
Danielle Seward represented Heart's Delight-Islington in the Miss Teen Newfoundland & Labrador Pageant in 2007. She was crowned the winner of the pageant that year.

== See also ==
- List of communities in Newfoundland and Labrador
