= Holy Heart of Mary Regional High School =

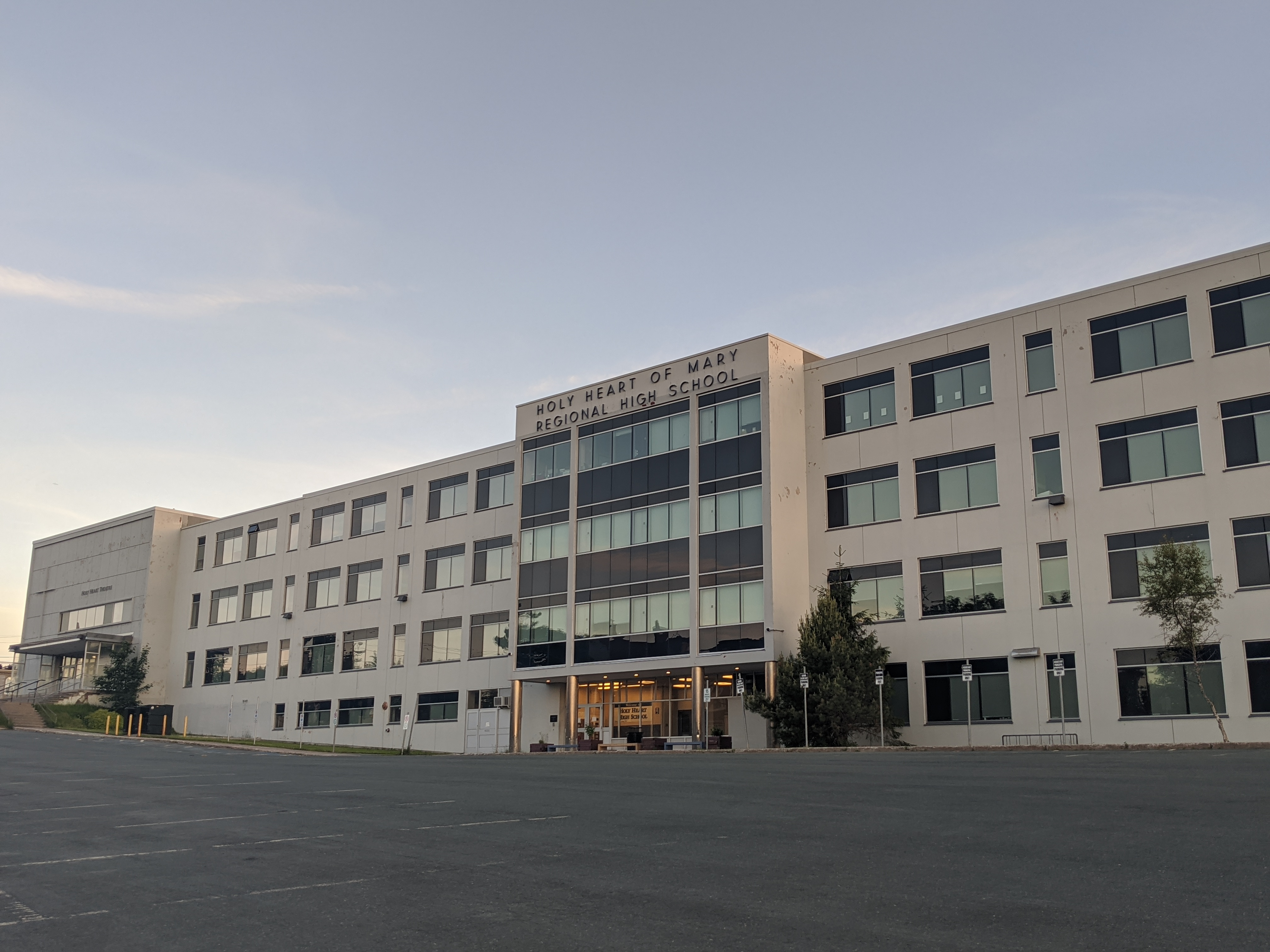
- Holy Heart as of July 2020

Location
- 55 Bonaventure Avenue; St. John's, NL, A1C 3Z3; Canada; 47°34′06.94″N 52°42′56.73″W

Information
- Type: Public
- Founded: 1958
- School board: Newfoundland and Labrador English School District
- Area trustee: Derek Winsor
- Principal: Carla Roberts
- Grades: 10-12
- Enrolment: 1212
- Language: English
- Website: www.holyhearthigh.ca

Holy Heart of Mary Regional High School is a public high school located in the downtown to midtown area of St. John's, Newfoundland and Labrador, Canada.

== History ==
Built in the 1950s by the Presentation sisters and the Sisters of Mercy, it was originally an all-girls school called "Holy Heart of Mary Regional High School for Girls". The first classes were held in November 1958.

== Outline ==
Historically, the student population has often exceeded 1,000 students; this makes Holy Heart of Mary one of the largest schools in the province. Holy Heart offers several Advanced Placement courses, and is also the only school in Newfoundland that currently offers the International Baccalaureate Diploma Programme. It is also one of the few schools in the province providing courses in English as a Second Language.

Academic standards are high at this institution and the teaching instruction offered typically includes a higher number of instructors and teachers with post-graduate degrees; many teachers at Holy Heart also teach at Memorial University.

Holy Heart's students have had strong showings in regional and provincial high school sports leagues, with teams in soccer, hockey, basketball, rugby, and other sports. Students have also had successes with national academic programs such as SHAD and the Canada Wide Science Fair, and at provincial competitions in drama, debating, and other activities.

The music program at the school is nationally and internationally renowned. The Holy Heart of Mary Chamber Choir, formerly led by Susan Quinn and now led by Robert Colbourne, won a gold medal at the International Youth and Music Festival in Vienna, Austria, in 1996, and has continued to win local and national awards since then, including First Prize for under-19 school choirs at the National Music Festival of Canada in 2007. It also performed at Carnegie Hall in May 2010. Several choir alumni perform in another amateur choir managed by Quinn, the Quintessential Vocal Ensemble.

The instrumental program, formerly led by Grant Etchegary, a recipient of the Prime Minister's Awards for Teaching Excellence, and now led by Mary Brennan, enjoys a similar reputation throughout Canada.

The Holy Heart Auditorium, attached to the school, was refurbished in 2006 and again in 2012 and has played host to a number of concerts from outside the school community. The theatre is open to students and staff during the academic day; students have full access to theatrical equipment. The Holy Heart Performing Arts Program hosts their classes and shows here, lead and directed by John Rao. In 2024, the Holy Heart of Mary Improv Team placed first place in the Canadian Improv Games.
