= Dorset Collegiate =

Location
- Pilley's Island; Newfoundland and Labrador; Canada; 49.4990°N 55.7024°W

Information
- School type: Public, High school
- Established: 1977
- Sister school: GBS Academy
- School district: Newfoundland and Labrador English School District
- Principal: Danielle Winsor
- Grades: 7-12
- Colours: Blue, Gold, and White
- Athletics: Badminton; Ball hockey Softball; Volleyball
- Mascot: Husky
- Team name: Dorset Huskies
- Rival: Springdale Wildcats
- Alumni: Jonah Winsor; Courtney Woodford

Dorset Collegiate (officially called Dorset Collegiate High School) is a school in Pilley's Island, Newfoundland and Labrador, Canada. The principal is Danielle Winsor and the vice principal is Alex Hutchings.

The school is in Division B of the 3A Provincial Slo-Pitch Tournament and Division A of the 3A Boys Volleyball Provincials. The school also participates in the annual Under 14/16/19 Atlantic Team Qualifier badminton tournament and the 3A Ball Hockey Tournament. In 1978, Dorset Collegiate participated in a student exchange program with Riverdale High School in Montreal, Quebec. In 2008, Dorset Collegiate hosted the annual review of the Royal Canadian Sea Cadets. In 2009, Courtney Woodford, a Dorset Collegiate student, won the Miss Talent title at the Miss Teen Newfoundland & Labrador Pageant. The school's 2009 graduation ceremonies were cancelled due to the death of Jonah Winsor, the captain of the school's hockey team. Winsor died in a single-vehicle accident near the school. He was driving a Kawasaki motorcycle at the time.
