= Kasimba Clan =

Names

The Kasimba clan, headed by Omutaka Kabazzi Mitti David Nampuuma, was one of the clans in Buganda or Central Uganda. The members of the Kasimba clan are called Ab'akasimba (Singular: Ow'akasimba). The members of this clan are Baganda people and speak Luganda language.

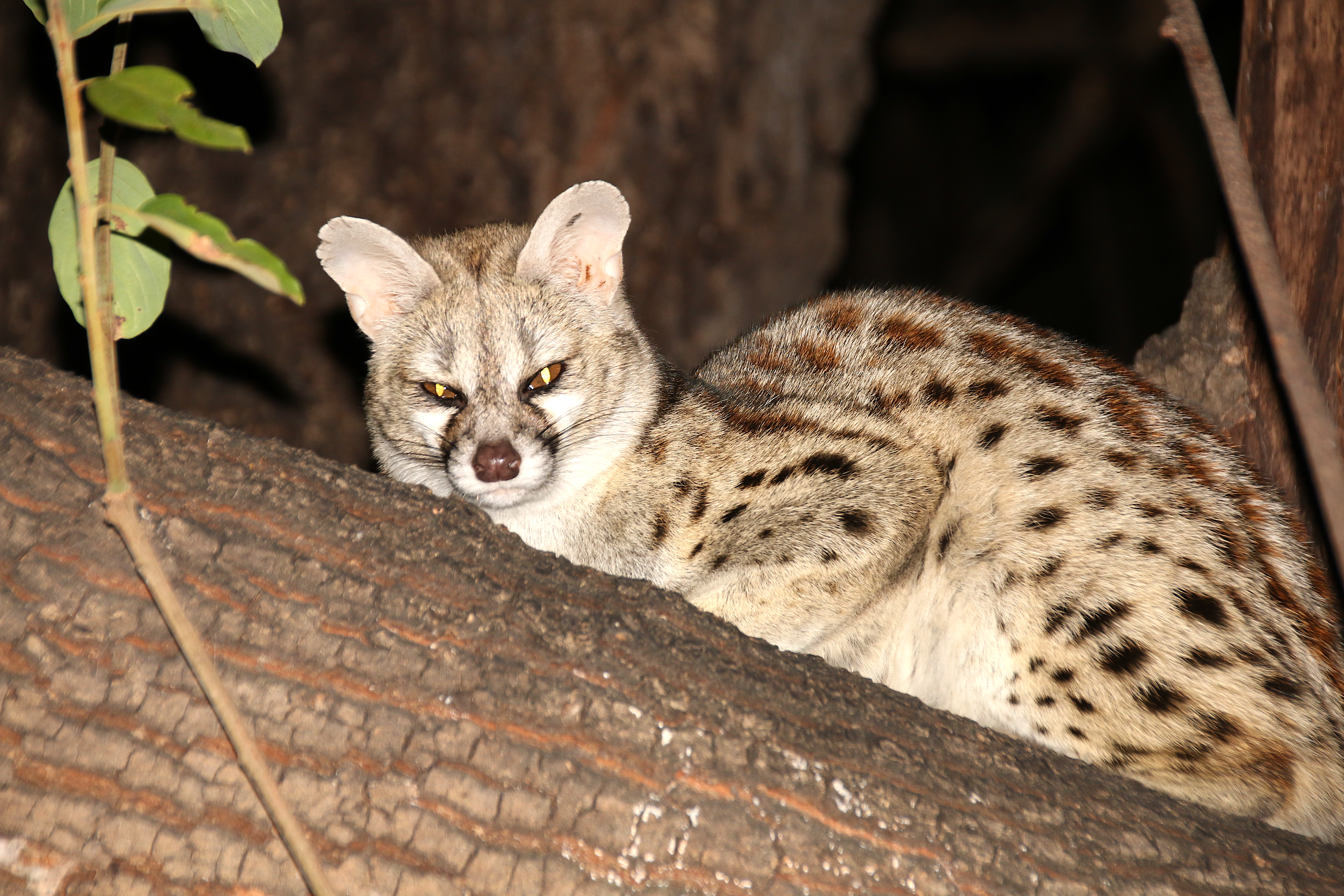
Genet, Akasimba in Luganda

== Titles ==
Kabazzi is the title of the head of the Kasimba clan. Omutaka is a general title for each head of a clan.

== Clan totems ==
The primary totem, Omuziro, is the Genet. The secondary totem, akabbiro, is a Leopard (Ngo). A member of the Kasimba clan is forbidden from eating or injuring the Genet.

== Structure ==
=== The Kabaka (Ssaabataka) ===
The Kabaka of Buganda is the head of the clan structure and the heads of the clans, the Bataka (plural form of Omutaka)) are under him.

=== Clan Head (Ow'Akasolya) ===
The head of the Kasolya (roof) is Omutaka Kabazzi.

=== Clan Seat (Obutaka) ===
The location of the clan seat (Obutaka) is in Kyango, Mawokota, Mpigi District, Uganda.

=== Clan motto (Omubala) ===
The clan's motto (omubala) or slogans (emibala) are:

1. Kiiso: bwe kikulaba obulungi, naawe okiraba.
2. Kababembe

== Duties and Responsibility at Palace ==
The members of the Kasimba clan were the Kabaka's Blacksmith and making Kabaka's Barkcloth.

== Clan Names (Mannya g'ekika) ==
The surnames or lastnames of people belonging to this clan vary depending on one's biological gender (Male or Female). Some of the names are common to all members of the clan but some are more commonly used in specific units (Essiga) of the clan. In fact, some of the names that a particular Ssiga uses may have come from a different clan, for instance due to Okubbula (i.e naming someone after a favorite or a deceased person who was dear to them).

=== Boys' Names ===
Some boys' names belonging to this clan are:

1. Bakulumpagi
2. Buyondo
3. Jeero
4. Kisawuzi
5. Kisiriinya
6. Kiyemba
7. Lubyayi
8. Mabuzi
9. Mazinga
10. Mazzi
11. Mbaziira
12. Nampuuma
13. Sseruwo
14. Walukagga
15. Kabuubi Luyijja

=== Girls' Names ===
Some girls' names belonging to this clan are:

1. Nnabazzi
2. Nnakawungu or (Nakawungu)
3. Nnakiyemba or (Nakiyemba)
4. Nnaluwo or (Naluwo)
5. Nnaluwooza or (Naluwooza)
6. Nnamazzi or (Namazzi)
7. Nnandagire or (Nandagire)

== Famous members of the clan ==
1. Peter Mazinga, Former soccer player with KCC FC.
