= Holy Spirit High School =

Holy Spirit High School may refer to:

- Holy Spirit High School (New Jersey), a school in Absecon, New Jersey
- Holy Spirit High School (Newfoundland), a school in Conception Bay South, Newfoundland and Labrador
- Holy Spirit High School (Tuscaloosa, Alabama), a private, Roman Catholic high school in Tuscaloosa, Alabama
