= Francis Chemonges =

Ugandan military officer

Brigadier Francis Chemonges
- Military career
- Allegiance: Uganda
- Branch: Uganda People’s Defence Force
- Rank: Brigadier
- Unit: Armoured Brigade
- Commands: Commandant, Kalama Armoured Warfare Training School (KAWATS); Operations Officer, Armoured Brigade; Battle Group Commander, AMISOM
- Conflicts: African Union Mission in Somalia (AMISOM)

Francis Chemonges, is a Ugandan military officer. He currently serves as the commandant of Kalama Armoured Warfare Training School (KAWATS), located in Kabamba, Mubende District, Central Uganda.

== Career ==
Immediately prior to his appointment to his current post, in May 2013, he served as the operations officer of the Armoured Brigade, located in Masaka, Masaka District, Central Uganda. In 2010, at the rank of lieutenant colonel, Francis Chemonges was a commander of a battle group in AMISOM, based in Mogadishu, Somalia. In 2021 he was the UPDF Chief of Operations in Land Forces. In 2023, he was replaced by Brigadier Peter Onzia Chandia as the new head of Kalama Armoured Warfare Training School.

== See also ==
- Katumba Wamala
- David Muhoozi
- Uganda People's Defence Force
