= J.M. Olds Collegiate =

High school in Newfoundland and Labrador, Canada

J.M. Olds Collegiate

Address

97 Main Street
Twillingate, NL, A0G 4M0
Canada

Contact

Tel (709) 884-5931

Information

School Board	NLESD
Principal	Scott Burton
Vice Principal
School type	Public
Grades	7 - 12
Language	English
Enrollment	111

== History ==
The school is named after Dr. John McKee Olds (March 27, 1906 - September 6, 1985) Dr. Olds practiced medicine in the town of Twillingate for over 49 years. The school was originally named Central High and was renamed to J.M. Olds Collegiate on March 22, 1980 in his honour.

== Academics ==
J.M. Olds Collegiate follows the standard Newfoundland and Labrador curriculum, offering general, academic, and advanced courses. The standard courses include English, Mathematics, Science, Physics, Biology, Chemistry, French, Physical Education, Social Studies, Career, Art and Music classes as well as electives such as Newfoundland Studies, Nutrition, Skilled Trades, Philosophy, Clothing, and Textiles.

== Extracurriculars ==
The school has junior and senior volleyball, basketball, softball, soccer, ice hockey, badminton, ball hockey and frisbee teams. The schools official mascot is a tiger. The school also has a Drama Club, and Art Club.

== See also ==
- Twillingate
