= Centre for Distance Learning and Innovation =

The Centre for Distance Learning & Innovation or CDLI is a branch of the Newfoundland and Labrador Department of Education responsible for providing efficient education opportunities to students living in remote areas.

== History ==
CDLI was founded in December 2000 following the recommendations of the 1999 Sparks-Williams Ministerial Panel on Educational Delivery.

Previous to its creation, distance learning and education in Newfoundland and Labrador had been an expensive and difficult undertaking. Due to all teacher-student communications being telephone based and all texts being in print, updating information and adding new students to the program became both time consuming and expensive.

Currently, CDLI is primarily computer and internet based. The network formed following its creation allows instant updating of texts, and webpage based education reduces the need for scheduled sessions with remote teachers.

Starting in the 2002 school year many schools made e-courses available through the Centre. These courses use the same curriculum as classroom-based education but are available to students whose schools may not offer courses they wish to take or are required for certain professions.

== Technology ==
The primary technological resource of CDLI is the internet which facilitates its other aspects.

- Headsets are used for vocal communication
- Webcams are used for visual teaching
- Tablets are used to communicate writing
- Desire2Learn is used for asynchronous communication
- Eluminate Live is used for synchronous communication via live web conferencing
- Polycoms are now being introduced into some schools to give the distance ed teachers a means to visually monitor their students while in class

Mostly proprietary software is used, although some software is based on the GNU GPL.

== Services ==
There are students who are "e-tutors" and they provide tutoring via E-live or are e-tutors in the schools themselves to help new students and teachers get introduced into using the technology. Materials needed are sometimes provided by CDLI and shipped by postal mail. A student survival guide is also provided as is a guidance room and many lunch-time presentations from nearby universities and so on. Multimedia learning objects or "mLos" are provided by teachers as "learning clips" or "mini-classes" for students seeking help outside of class. The general software used is Internet Explorer, Mozilla Firefox, Desire2Learn, Adobe Flash, PDF files, Windows Media Files and other media-type files, and Sun Java is used. Chemsketch is used for chemical molecular modelling, as is Ti-83+ interface software and of course word processing software is also used. There is a wide variety of software that is used. There is also a math league, a math club were students compete in solving mathematical problems.

== Courses offered ==
CDLI Courses

Academic Mathematics 2204 Academic Mathematics 3103 Academic Mathematics 3204 Advanced Mathematics 2205 Advanced Mathematics 3205 Advanced Mathematics 3207 AP Psychology 4220 Art & Design 3200 Art Technologies 1201 Biology 2201 Biology 3201 Canadian Economy 2203 Canadian History 1201 Career Development 2201 Chemistry 2202 Chemistry 3202 Communications Technology 2104/3104 English 1201 English 2201 English 3201 Enterprise Education 3205 Environmental Science 3215 Experiencing Music 2200 French 2200 French 3200 French 3201 Healthy Living 1200 Integrated Systems 1205 Mathematics 1204 Physics 2204 Physics 3204 Science 1206 World Geography 3202 World History 3201 Writing 2203

CDLI Resource Courses

AP Biology 4221 AP Chemistry 4222 AP Math 4225 AP Physics 4224 Career Exploration 1100 Human Dynamics 2201 Intermediate Technology Education—Control Science 2200

== Scope ==
Access to CDLI is freely available to all students. While communication with teachers is mostly reserved for distance learners, students in urban settings may also benefit from web-based course information and lessons.
