= Miss Teen Newfoundland & Labrador Pageant =

The Miss Teen Newfoundland & Labrador Pageant is a teen pageant based out of St. John's, Newfoundland & Labrador, Canada. Founded in 1996, the pageant sets out to annually showcase the talents and achievements and build the confidence of the province's brightest young women, between the ages of 13 and 18. It is the longest-running teen pageant in the province, one of the most widely recognized and successful pageants in Canada, and is one of the select few pageant events in Canada to be televised.

The winner becomes an active ambassador and role model for the province's young women, and over the course of her reign, tours the province, volunteering at various community festivals and charitable events. She is also the recipient of a formidable prize package, including a $1,500 academic scholarship. As of 2009, the pageant is also the selection medium for Newfoundland & Labrador's delegates at the Miss Teenage Canada Pageant (formerly Miss Teen Canada-World), the largest teen pageant in Canada.

== Pageant history ==
The Miss Teen Newfoundland & Labrador Pageant began in 1997 to fill the void for a teen pageant in the province, after the cessation of the original Miss Teen Newfoundland Pageant in 1990. It is held annually at the St. John's Arts and Culture Centre, which, with a seating capacity of 1,013, is the largest theatre in the province. Since that time, it has emerged as a major player in the Canadian pageant industry, influencing the scoring systems of numerous other events, and actively seeking to alter the widely held views of what a teen pageant entails.

The pageant was traditionally held in February or March, but as of 2014, the pageant realigned to become a fall event, with its next edition taking place October 2–5. From 1997 to2005, the pageant was held over a four-day weekend; however, in 2006, it was reduced to three days. As of 2009, the pageant has since returned to the four-day pageant weekend format.

With unprecedented media coverage, web traffic, participants, audience-goers and staff, it is currently the largest pageantry event in the province of Newfoundland & Labrador.

== Scoring system ==
Dispelling the stereotypical view of pageantry, the Miss Teen Newfoundland & Labrador is not a beauty pageant. The scoring system consists of a 40% personal interview with the judging panel, a 20% academic test, a 15% fitness test (all of which take place in the days leading up to the pageant's final gala), and on-stage casual and evening wear competitions worth 10% each. Upon completion of the first half of the show, the top 10 contestants scoring the highest advance to the semi-finals, where they may give a speech on a topic of their choice, worth 25%. The top 10 are then narrowed to the top 5 contestants, who answer an impromptu question, again worth 25%. These scores are then tabulated by a professional auditor to determine the winner of the pageant.

For 11 years, the final round of the pageant included the top four contestants. However, in 2008, the pageant expanded to include a fifth finalist.

In addition to the winner and four runners-up, the pageant also hands out other individual awards, including Miss Teen Academic Achievement (to the contestant who scores the highest on the academic test), Miss Teen Fitness (to the contestant who scores the highest on the fitness test), Miss Teen Talent (an optional competition with its own separate judging panel), Miss Teen Photogenic (as judged by Sara Rostotski and Sharon Woodford), Miss Teen Friendship (voted on by the contestants themselves), and (as of 2008) the People's Choice Award (as voted by the general public via the pageant's website).

In 2013, the pageant also included a humanitarian component (worth 5% of their preliminary score), where the contestants were tasked to raise a target of $200 each for the pageant's official charity, the Children's Wish Foundation of Newfoundland & Labrador. The 20 delegates of 2013 raised $24,023.86 for the cause. (Photo of cheque presentation)

== Weekend activities ==
Prior to the pageant's glamorous final gala, the contestants participate in a number of educational or recreational activities as a group. These have included in the past such things as glow bowling, rock climbing, educational seminars (haircare, public speaking, motivational seminars, scholarship acquisition, etc.), tours of the provincial Government House and House of Assembly, a boat cruise throughout St. John's harbour, taking in local community musical productions, etc.

== Titleholders ==
2017	Jessica Skinner	Kippens
2016	Chanel Zhouri	Grand Falls- Windsor
2015	Alaina Joe	Conne River
2014	Sonali Verma	Stephenville
2013	Raylene Mackey	Goulds
2012	Emily Bland	Grand Falls-Windsor
2011	Chelsea Butler	Conception Bay South
2010	Georgina Barbour	Witless Bay
2010	Somaria Balram	St. John's
2009	Chelsea Squires	Burin
2008	Laura Woodworth	Grand Falls-Windsor
2007	Danielle Seward	Heart's Delight-Islington
2006	Sabrina Fitzpatrick	Kilbride
2005	Nikita Hickey	Grand le Pierre
2004	Melissa Jenkins	Carbonear
2004	Renée Hodder	Mount Pearl
2003	Ashley Bursey	St. John's
2002	Kristen Parsons	Wabush
2001	Natalie Langor	Corner Brook
2000	Arlene O'Keefe	Paradise
1999	Crystal Freake	Grand Falls-Windsor
1999	Melanie O'Brien	Paradise
1998	Christa Borden	Chamberlains
1997	Kathleen Bradbury	Mount Pearl

- In 2014, the pageant was realigned from a March event to an October pageant. As such, the 2013 1st runner-up (Verma) was awarded the title of Miss Teen 2014, and will carry out her reign until a new winner is crowned in October 2014.
- In 2010, winner Somaria Balram left the province to pursue post-secondary education in Nova Scotia, resulting in 1st runner-up Georgina Barbour assuming the title in August 2010.
- In 2004, winner Renée Hodder elected to not sign the titleholder agreement, resulting in 1st runner-up Melissa Jenkins (Carbonear) assuming the title in October 2004.
- In 1999, Crystal Freake was the winner of the Miss Teen Canada International title, resulting in the 1st runner-up Melanie O'Brien (Paradise) assuming the provincial title.

== Production ==
- Since 1998, the pageant's running crowning theme has been "You're a Superstar" by Canadian band Love Inc.
- The pageant is traditionally co-hosted by the outgoing Miss Teen Newfoundland & Labrador, and has featured co-hosts such as Mark Critch (Newfoundland & Labrador comedian) (1998-2001), Larry Jay (Oz FM radio and NTV television personality) (1997), Tom Ormsby (VOCM radio personality) (2002-2004), and former pageant assistant director Chris Fry (2005–2016). In 2015, Laura Woodworth became the first repeat co-host, returning as an OZ FM personality after hosting in 2009 as the outgoing Miss Teen. For the 2016 pageant, Fry (in his final appearance) was joined by NTV personality Sharon Snow.
- Miss Teen Newfoundland & Labrador appears annually on the cover of the provincial entertainment magazine 'The Newfoundland Herald'.
- The pageant's judging panel has a star-studded history, featuring such notable judges as Natalie Glebova (Miss Universe 2005), Marjorie Clarke (2005 North American Hairstylist of the Year), Robin Barker (widely recognized Toronto hairstylist), Jimmy Steele (renowned Canadian pageant expert and coach), Lorne Rostotski, Christa Borden (Miss Teen NL 1998 and 'Popstars' competition winner), former MP Siobhan Coady, local designer Rodney Philpott, and local media celebrities Toni-Marie Wiseman and Danielle Butt (NTV), Leanne Sharpe (99.1 HITS FM), and Claudette Barnes (VOCM).
- Since 2011 Miss Teen Newfoundland & Labrador Pageant has been televised on several occasions by NTV, restoring the pageant as one of the only pageant events in the country to be broadcast on television.

== Records ==
- On October 5, 2007, the pageant's website celebrated its one millionth visitor. According to the web traffic ranking tool Alexa.com, the Miss Teen Newfoundland & Labrador pageant is the second most popular teen pageant website in the world.
- Arlene O'Keefe (2000, Paradise) won the Miss Newfoundland & Labrador title in 2006, making her the first woman to win both provincial titles. Six other Miss Teen Newfoundland & Labrador past contestants (Crystal Snow, Aimee Power, Sabrina Jenkins, Sheena Winsor, Charlotte Gushue, and Bridgette Abbott) have also gone on to win the Miss Newfoundland & Labrador Pageant.
- As of 2014, Kristen Parsons (2002) remains the only contestant from the Labrador portion of the province to win the pageant.
- Miss Teen NL 2003 Ashley Bursey placed as the 1st runner-up at the 2006 Miss World Canada Pageant, and placed in the top 15 of the 2007 Miss Universe Canada contest. Miss Teen NL 2008 Laura Woodworth was the winner of the People's Choice Award and a top 20 semi-finalist at the 2014 Miss Universe Canada competition.
- In 2006, Sabrina Fitzpatrick (Miss Teen NL 2006) was the winner of the Miss Teen Canada Scholarship Pageant in Niagara Falls, Ontario, while Kristen Parsons (Miss Teen NL 2002) was the winner of the Miss Canada Scholarship division that same night. Arlene O'Keefe (Miss Teen NL 2000) also competed in the Miss division as Newfoundland & Labrador's third representative.
- Stephanie Brennan (2000 and 2001 Miss Teen NL 1st runner-up) was the first (and only) Miss Teen Millennium Pageant in 2001.
- 2012 marked the first time that both the winner and 1st runner-up were from the same town. Emily Bland (Miss Teen 2012) and Teryn Gray (1st runner-up) were both natives of Grand Falls-Windsor.
- Newfoundland & Labrador has sent delegates to Miss Teenage Canada (formerly Miss Teen Canada-World) since 2009, with considerable success. NL has sent Somaria Balram and Sasha Best (2009), Jaya Pham (2010 - People's Choice Award winner and top 20), Chelsea Butler (People's Choice Award winner and top 20), Emily Bland, Nicole Kennedy, and Rebecca Hobbs (2011), and Hayleigh McGrath (top 20) and Courtney Jones in 2012, and Bailey Tarrant (top 20) in 2015. Balram and Bland went on to win the Miss Teen NL titles the following year after they each competed nationally.
