= St. Paul's Intermediate School =

Location
- 5 Magee Road; Gander, Newfoundland, A1V 1W1; Canada

Information
- School type: Intermediate
- Founded: 1961
- Grades: 7-9
- Language: English
- Team name: Cardinals
- Website: www.k12.nf.ca/sptech/

St. Paul's Intermediate School is a middle school in Gander, Newfoundland and Labrador. It is part of the Newfoundland and Labrador English School District, (NLESD), and has an attendance of approximately 400 students each year.

== History ==
St. Paul's has undergone many changes since 1961 when it first opened its doors. It originally housed grades 7 through 11 on Bishop Street in Gander, Newfoundland and Labrador. In 1976, a new high school called St. Paul's High School was built with a DREE grant. This new complex is situated on Magee Road, formerly Gander Bay Road. In 1982, the school began housing grades 7-12 as the whole province moved to a credit system. Grade 12 was offered for the first time. A joint services agreement between the Nova Consolidated School Board and the Gander-Connaigre R.C. Board was initiated in 1995 making St. Paul's an Intermediate School with grades 8 and 9.

As of the 1998-99 year, the school has been re-designed once more as a grade 7-9 school. This school is now administered by the Newfoundland and Labrador English School District. Students in Gander and Benton attended Gander Academy for grades K-3, then Gander Elementary for grades 3-6 before entering St. Paul's. Upon graduation from St. Paul's, they enter Gander Collegiate for grades 10-12.

=== September 11 attacks ===
Following the September 11, 2001 attacks over 6,000 passengers from grounded planes became stranded in Gander. To accommodate this influx of people, students were sent home to allow passengers to stay in local schools. St. Paul's was home to hundreds of passengers during this time. Meals and bunks were provided as well as television coverage of events in the cafeteria and internet access was allowed within the school's two computer labs.

== Sports ==
St. Paul's mascot is the cardinal and the team colors are red and black. St. Paul's currently has varsity and junior varsity teams for basketball and volleyball.

There are 12 house teams which take part in three sports: basketball, volleyball, and soccer. With three teams per house for each sport, these teams take part in round-robin play to earn points for their respective houses.

St. Paul's gymnasium houses many activities unrelated to the school. Summer activities, tournaments, and other sports teams play and practice in the gymnasium.

== See also ==
- Gander Academy
- Gander Collegiate
