= Ganda, Tibet =

Ganda
- Location within Tibet
- Coordinates: 31°30′N 94°16′E
- Country: China
- Region: Tibet

Population
  - Total
  - Major Nationalities: Tibetan
  - Regional dialect: Tibetan language
- Time zone: +8

Ganda is a town in Nagqu Prefecture in the Tibet Autonomous Region of China. It lies at an altitude of 12,750 ft (3,890 metres). The Dzogchen Monastery is nearby.
