= Bishops College (Newfoundland) =

Location
- 190 Pennywell Road; St. John's, Newfoundland and Labrador, A1C 2L6; Canada; 47°33′40″N 52°43′30″W

Information
- School type: High School
- Motto: Laudimus Viros Gloriosos (Let us now praise famous men)
- Founded: 1959
- Closed: 2015
- School board: Eastern School District
- School number: 709-579-4107
- Principal: Bridget Ricketts
- Grades: L1-L4
- Enrollment: 600
- Colours: Red and white
- Mascot: Snoopy & the Red Baron
- Team name: Barons
- Website: www.bishops.k12.nf.ca

Bishops College was a high school located in central St. John's, Newfoundland and Labrador. It was next to another high school called Booth Memorial High.

Bishops College had a French immersion and English stream programs and was well into its fifth decade as an educational institution. It offered grades 10 to 12 to a total student population of about 600 and operated under the Newfoundland and Labrador Department of Education curriculum. Bishops College was under the trusteeship of the Eastern School District.

It closed on June 25, 2015. Students from Bishops and the neighbouring Booth Memorial High commenced the 2015-2016 school year at Waterford Valley High, which was built to replace both aging schools.

In September 2019, it was announced that the building will reopen after extensive renovations as Bishops Gardens, a state of the art seniors home.

== History ==
Before 1787 the Church of England in Newfoundland was under the jurisdiction of the Bishop of London, and then later the diocese of Nova Scotia. It was not until 1839 that the first Bishop of Newfoundland, the Right Rev. Aubrey George Spencer, was consecrated. Spencer laid foundations upon which his successors built. He extended the work of the church, established a school for the training of clergymen (afterward Queen's College), and laid the foundation stone for the building of a cathedral in St. John's. Under his successor, the Right Rev. Edward Feild, education continued to be encouraged, and orphanages founded.

Bishop Feild founded a collegiate school for boys which in 1894 became Bishop Feild College. He also established Bishop Spencer College, a diocesan school for girls. For 100 years these schools were homes to boys and girls from the Church of England. Bishop Feild College was the college for all Anglican people in Newfoundland. To that end, Feild Hall was erected near present-day St. Thomas' Church to house the "outport" boys whose parents could afford to send them to Feild. Bishop Jones Hostel (Rennies Mill Road) was the girls' accommodation.

The present Bishop Feild School, the old Bishop Feild College, was erected in 1926 and opened in 1928.

In 1959 Bishops College was built by the Anglican Church, necessitating a diminishing of the old Bishops Feild College to a junior high.

In 1972 a further decrease in Feild's status came when junior high schools such as Macdonald Drive, Macpherson and I.J. Samson were built. Thus Feild became a Primary/Elementary School and by 1986 it was a French Immersion School.

=== First amalgamation ===
Formation of the Integrated School Board, which was called the Avalon Consolidated School Board, occurred in 1969. This amalgamation brought together the United, Anglican, Presbyterian, and the Salvation Army. At this time Bishops College was no longer a school for Anglican male and females but for most Protestant religions.

=== Second amalgamation ===
In 1995 the people of Newfoundland voted 54% to reduce the denominational system in Newfoundland and by 1998 a provincially run system was set up. Gone was 277 years of denominational education. Bishops College, along with Booth Memorial became the schools serving the west end of St. John's and Kilbride area. Feeder schools for Bishops were Cowan Heights Elementary and I. J. Samson Junior High. In 2005 a change in the feeder system brought St. Matthew's Elementary and Hazelwood Academy, feeding into Beaconsfield Junior High and then to Bishops College.

In 2015, the school closed after operating for 56 years. Several years later, the building was converted into Bishops Gardens, a personal care home for senior citizens.

== Mascot ==
The mascot for Bishops was the "Bishops Baron." Despite the name, he was frequently depicted as Snoopy from Peanuts fighting the Red Baron as a World War I fighter ace.

== Arms ==
Coat of arms of Bishops College

Notes
Recorded at the College of Arms 15 December 1961.
Crest
A bishop’s mitre Gules charged with a cross patté Or.
Escutcheon
Argent on a cross between four crosses patté Gules an open book proper edged and clasped Or, on a chief Azure a pascal lamb proper all within a bordure Gules charged with seven crosses patté Argent.
Motto
Laudemus Viros Gloriosos
