= Marystown Central High School =

- Marystown, Newfoundland and Labrador; Canada

Information
- Type: Public
- Motto: Latin: Quaerite Veritatem (Search for Truth)
- Established: 1972
- School district: Newfoundland and Labrador English School District
- Principal: Susan Tobin-Bursey
- Staff: 35
- Enrollment: 351
- Colours: Blue and red
- Website: www.mchs.ca

Marystown Central High School is a public high school located in Marystown, Newfoundland and Labrador.

Funded by the federal government, Marystown Central High School was opened in 1972. Funded by a Department of Regional Economic Expansion (DREE) grant, it was considered to be a state of the art school and continues to be so today.

== History ==
Upon its opening, approximately 650 students attended the school. This included grades seven through eleven. The principal at the time was Leo Whalen, and the vice principal was Frank Kennedy.

== Administration ==
The principal is Susan Tobin-Bursey, and the assistant principal is Michelle Rowsell.

== Motto ==
Quaerite Veritatem is the school's motto. It is Latin for "Search for Truth." This slogan appears on the school's crest.

== Science and technology labs ==
The school has two science laboratories at its disposal: the biology lab and the chemistry lab. It also has two computer facilities, serving a number of functions including: design, graphic editing, webdesign and web page creation.
