= Quintessential Vocal Ensemble =

The Quintessential Vocal Ensemble (QVE) is an amateur choir based in St. John's, Newfoundland and Labrador, Canada. The choir, formed in 1993, is led by artistic director Susan Quinn and consists of approximately 40 members.

The choir performs a diverse repertoire including classical, jazz, contemporary, and traditional Newfoundland music.

== Awards and recognition ==
The choir has received several national and international awards:

- First prize (Mixed Choirs) and second prize (Youth Choirs) at the Llangollen International Musical Eisteddfod in Wales (2008).
- Second prize in the Cork International Choral Festival in Ireland.
- The Prix du Ministère de la Culture et de la Communication, Prix Rabelais, and Prix Ockhegem at the Florilège Vocal de Tours in France.
- First prize (Mixed Community Choirs) in the CBC National Radio Competition for Amateur Choirs.
- First prize and the City of Lincoln Trophy (Adult Choirs) of the Federation of Canadian Music Festivals.
