= Gander Academy =

Location
- 55 Fraser Road; Gander, Newfoundland and Labrador, A1V 1K8; Canada; 48.9564°N 54.6147°W

Information
- School type: Primary
- Motto: Spectate Ad Caelum (High Five)
- School board: Newfoundland and Labrador English School District
- Grades: Kindergarten to Grade 3
- Language: English and French Immersion
- Team name: The Cormorants
- Website: www.k12.nf.ca/ganderacademy/

Gander Academy is a school in Gander, Newfoundland and Labrador, Canada. It is operated by the Newfoundland and Labrador English School District.

== History ==
In 1996, a neighboring Catholic school, St. Joseph's Elementary, closed its doors. The former students of St. Joseph's were moved into the larger Gander Academy building, which greatly increased enrollment of the latter.

In 2000, the former middle school, Gander Middle School, was also shut down. Having previously housed grades 6 through 8, grades 7 and 8 were moved into St. Paul's Intermediate School, while the grade 6 class was relocated to Gander Academy.

=== September 11, 2001 ===
During the week following the September 11, 2001 attacks approximately 750 passengers from grounded flights Virgin Air 21, Sabena 439, and Lufthansa 416 were housed at Gander Academy. Soon after on October 11, 2001, Captain Robert Burgess made a presentation of $5,000.00 consisting of money donated by passengers of Virgin Atlantic flight 21 which was then matched by the airline. Plans were also made to have a free trip for select students to London as a further sign of thanks.

=== Canada Day 2006 ===
For the tenth anniversary of UNISONG the Gander Academy Choir as well as music teacher Mark Thibeault was invited to Ottawa to sing at Canada Day celebrations. On July 1, 2006, the Choir sang the "Ode to Newfoundland" at the War Memorial Site in Ottawa, Canada.

== Activities ==
Spelling Bee, Choir, After school sports, Comic club, Drama club, Student council and Tin whistle.

=== Science & Technology Days ===
The "Science & Technology Days" occur over a few days in which students take part in technology-related activities put off by various organizations in town. A few of these include an annual demonstration of electrical safety by Newfoundland Power and a demonstration of police equipment (such as radar guns) by the Royal Canadian Mounted Police (RCMP).

== Theme pages ==
Created by Jim Cornish, a retired grade 5 teacher at Gander Academy, the theme pages are intended as an online learning environment for children participating in the elementary program covering a wide variety of subjects. Originally created as a portal for research for students attending the school, the theme pages are currently being used by many schools across Canada as well as the Centre for Distance Learning & Innovation in teaching students living in remote communities without established learning institutions.
