= Kainawa =

Sierra Leonean musician (born 1990)

Matthew "Kainawa" Ganda (born May 21, 1990), is a United Kingdom based recording artist, and record producer.

The artist performs using his middle name "Kainawa" which means in his Mende language "The Big Man."

His debut single "PACKAGE" was released on 12 September 2016.
