= Baganda =

Bantu ethnic group native to Buganda, Uganda

- Flag of the Buganda Kingdom.

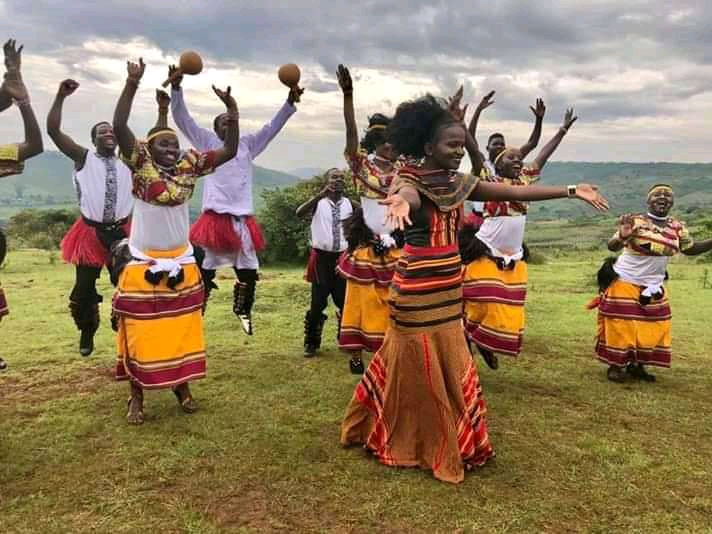
- Baganda traditional dance

Total population
- 7,037,404

Regions with significant populations
- Uganda

Languages
- Luganda, Swahili, English

Religion
- Christianity, African Traditional Religion, Islam

Related ethnic groups
- Basoga, Bagwere and other Bantu peoples

Ganda
- Person: OmuGanda
- People: AbaGanda
- Language: OluGanda
- Country: BuGanda

The Baganda (endonym: (A)Baganda; singular (O)Muganda; in Luganda or plural Waganda in Kiswahili or Ganda in old English texts) are a Bantu ethnic group that share a common culture, history and language and clans, and are primarily native to Buganda, a subnational kingdom within Uganda. Traditionally composed of 52 clans (although since a 1993 survey, only 46 are officially recognised), the Baganda are the largest people of the Bantu ethnic group in Uganda, comprising 15.3 percent of the population at the time of the 2024 census.

A single individual is called a Muganda, whereas several people are called Baganda. The word Abaganda refers to "the Baganda people" and Omuganda refers to "the Muganda person".

Sometimes described as "the King's Men" because of the importance of the king, or Kabaka, in their society, the Baganda number an estimated 16.3 million people in Uganda. In addition, there is a significant diaspora abroad, with organised communities in Canada, South Africa, Sweden, the United Kingdom, and the United States. Traditionally, they speak Luganda but each Muganda must belong to a clan.

== Etymology ==
The term Ganda means brotherhood and unity and comes from the noun "obuganda", which means bundles of sticks piled, wrapped, or tied together. it ultimately comes from the Proto Bantu word, "ngàndá" (family).

== Clan structure ==
The Baganda are organized in clans (Luganda: ebika (plural); ekika (singular)). The clan is a unit of social organization and in the past, was also a unit of political organization. Every Muganda must belong to a clan. This is usually his or her father's clan and so a "naturalized" Muganda person must pick a clan to belong to, and therefore a surname or last name belonging to that clan. Each clan will have a list of at least 20 boys' surnames and 20 girls' surnames for one to pick from. Therefore, one's surname (last name) will give a clue to which clan they belong as well as their biological gender. The exceptions to this are a woman's married name (which she inherits from her husband) as well as unique names given to twins,(Nakato and Babirye for the girls, Waswa and Kato for the boys) and their immediate siblings or Royals (the first-born son is called Kiweewa and the first-born daughter is called Nassolo), and gods' (lubaale) names.

All members of a clan are believed to have a common ancestors. This means that they are siblings and so it's taboo for them to marry each other (clan exogamy). This was held up in a court of law in the case of Bruno L. Kiwawu v. Ivan Serunkuma and Juliet Namazzi in May 2007. A few exceptions exist, especially among the members of the large Mmamba clan. On occasion, these have been known to intermarry.

The Baganda are organized around roughly 50 clans with the Kabaka (Ssaabataka) being the head of the clan heads (Abataka). Each clan has a hierarchical structure. The top (or roof) of this clan hierarchy is called Akasolya. So the Baganda are organized around the roughly 50 roofs (obusolya (plural); akasolya (singular)). The person who heads the clan is called Ow'akasolya. Below each roof (or Kasolya) are several units called amasiga, headed by Ow'essiga. Essiga is singular form of Amasiga. Under each ssiga are several units called ennyiriri (singular olunyiriri), headed by Ow'olunyiriri. Below the lunyiriri are several units called emituba, headed by Ow'omutuba. Omutuba is singular form of Emituba. Below each mutuba are several units called enzigya, headed by Ow'oluggya. Oluggya is singular form of Enzigya. The Luggya is the level of the paternal grandfather (of the family). Below the luggya are several units called ennyumba (houses), headed by Ow'ennyumba. The House is essentially the nuclear family and is headed by a father or, if he is dead, by his male heir. The heir is a cultural head not economic head and so for instance, in a household headed by a single mother or a widow, the family property is not owned by the cultural heir. Among the Baganda, an heiress is a biological female who inherits the cultural position of a deceased woman (i.e sister or mother). In ancient times, this heiress, if she were single, could become the widower's wife as it was assumed that she would love her deceased sister's children as if they were her own.

Every Muganda person must belong to one of the more than 52 clans of Baganda. A Muganda is therefore expected to know his or her paternal clan (and Totem) as well has his or her maternal clan. As part of one's formal introduction or greeting (especially at traditional ceremonies), one must be able to say their last name (surname), their father's surname, their paternal grandfather's name, their mother's clan, their clan Totem and clan motto or slogan (Omubala) and finally their lineage in terms of the Akasolya, Ssiga, Mutuba, Lunyiriri and Nnyumba or Nju (House). This is generally called okutambula ng'Omuganda ("narrating your lineage Luganda).

=== Organization ===
The clans are social units and in the past were political units as well.

The Baganda has over 50 organized clans (Ebika)that serves as a foundation of social, cultural and political organization with members tracing their ancestry to a common ancestor. The Kabaka also known as (Ssaabataka) is the chief of the patriarch also called (Abataka). Each clan has a hierarchical structure. The helm of this clan [hierarchy] is called Akasolya. So the [Baganda] are organized roughly over 50 helms (Obusolya). Akasolya is the singular form of Obusolya. Each Clan has a designated leader known as Ow'akasolya. Each helm (or Kasolya) has several units called Amasiga (or pillars in English), headed by Ow'essiga. Essiga is singular form of Amasiga. Under each Ssiga are several units called Ennyiriri, headed by Ow'olunyiriri. Olunyiriri is the singular form of Ennyiriri. Below the lunyiriri are several units called Emituba, headed by Ow'omutuba. Omutuba is singular form of Emituba. Under each Mutuba are several units called Enzigya, headed by Ow'oluggya. Oluggya is singular form of Enzigya. The Luggya is the level of the paternal grandfather (of the family). Below the luggya are several units called Ennyumba (Houses) or Enju, headed by Ow'ennyumba (Ennyumba is singular form of Ennyumba). The House is essentially the nuclear family and is headed by a father. In case dies, then it is headed by his heir (always a biological male). For instance, the members of Mr. Nsubuga's nuclear family would be called Ab'enju ya Mwami Nsubuga if he is alive or Ab'enju y'Omugenzi Nsubuga if he is deceased. Omugenzi is the Luganda word for "The late or deceased".

Political Unit: Represented at Kabaka's court (King's court). Location of the clan's seat (Obutaka) and/or land. Responsibilities of the clan at the Kabaka's palace (Lubiri).

Social Unit: Represented in Lukiiko (cultural unit). Clan head (Omutaka)

=== Totems ===
Each clan is identified by a specific animal or plant totem, symbolizing ancestry and revered by clan members. This is categorized into two:

- 1. (Omuziro) also known as the primary totem representing a specific clan .
- 2. Secondary Totem (Akabbiro).The Akabbiro serves as a secondary identifier, and both are taboo for clan members to eat or harm. These totems help define lineage and prevent intermarriages. The Akabbiro is a secondary taboo, similar to the main totem (Omuziro), and reinforces the identity of a particular clan.

The members of a clan cannot eat or harm their totem animal, plant or thing. For example, a member of the Mmamba (lungfish) clan is forbidden from consuming a lungfish. However, members of other clans do eat lungfish.

=== List of clans ===
The clans are:

1. Abalangira (Royals)
2. Babiito b'e Kooki
3. Babiito b'e Kiziba
4. Babiito b'e Kibulala
5. Butiko (Mushrooms)
6. Ffumbe (Civet Cat)
7. Kasanke (Ruddy Waxbill, African Firefinch)
8. Kasimba (Genet Cat)
9. Kayozi (Jumping Rat)
10. Kibe (Black-backed Jackal)
11. Kibuba (Morning dew pad)
12. Kinyomo (Large black ant)
13. Kiwere (purple dye plant)
14. Kkobe (Air potato)
15. Lugave (Pangolin)
16. Lukato (Stilleto)
17. Mazzi ga Kisasi (Porch water)
18. Mbogo (Buffalo)
19. Mbuzi (Goat)
20. Mbwa (Dog)
21. Mmamba Gabunga (Lungfish)
22. Mmamba Kakoboza (Lungfish)
23. Mpeewo (Oribi Antelope)
24. Mpindi (Cowpea)
25. Mpologoma (Lion)
26. Musu (Edible Greater Cane Rat)
27. Mutima Musagi
28. Mutima Muyanja (Heart)
29. Nnakinsige (Red-cheeked Cordon-bleu (Uraeginthus bengalus) or brown grass finch)
30. Ndiga (Sheep)
31. Ndiisa (lark)
32. Ngabi Nnyunga (Bushbuck)
33. Ngabi Nsamba (Antelope)
34. Ngeye (Colobus Monkey)
35. Ngo (Leopard)
36. Njaza (Bohor Reedbuck)
37. Njobe (Marshbuck Sitatunga Antelope)
38. Njovu (Elephant)
39. Nkebuka (Excrement)
40. Nkejje (Sprat)
41. Nkerebwe (African Bush Squirrel)
42. Nkima (Vervet Monkey)
43. Nkula (Rhinoceros)
44. Nkusu (African Parrot)
45. Nnamuŋŋoona (Pied Crow)
46. Nnyonyi Nnyange (Cattle Egret)
47. Nseenene (Ruspolia differens, nipidula)
48. Nsuma (Snout Fish)
49. Nsunu (Uganda Kob)
50. Nswaswa (Monitor Lizard)
51. Ntalaganya (Blue Duiker)
52. Nte (Ente Eteriiko Mukira oba Enkunku (The tailless Cow))
53. Nvubu (Hippopotamus)
54. Nvuma (underwater spiky seed)
55. Ŋŋaali (Ngaali) (Crested Crane)
56. Ŋŋonge (Ngonge) (Otter)

==== Nnansangwa (Original Clans) ====
The oldest clans trace their lineage to Bakiranze Kivebulaya, who is supposed to have ruled in the region from about 400 AD until about 1300 AD. These seven clans are referred to as the Nansangwa, or the indigenous:

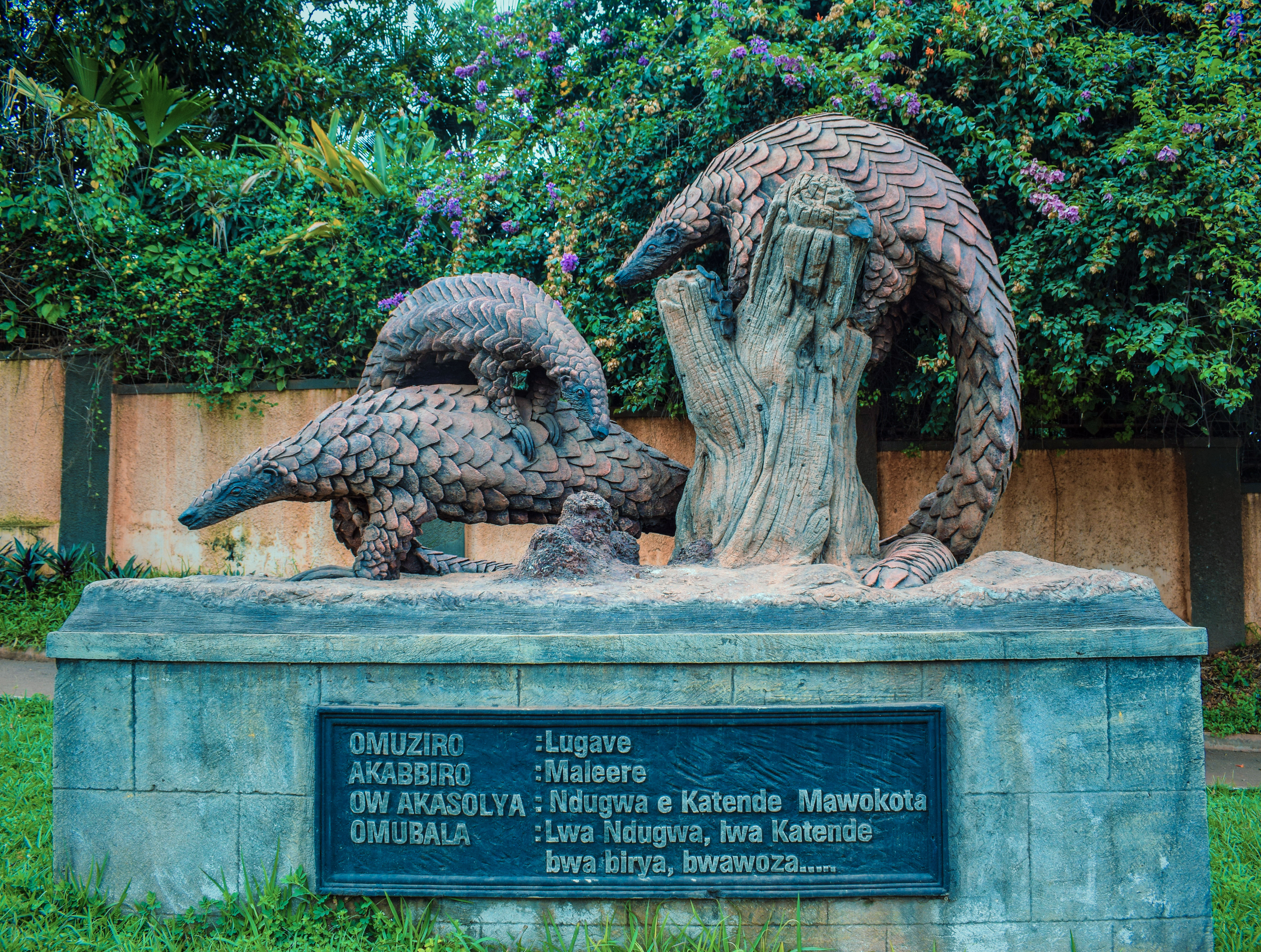
1. Lugave Clan
  Lugave (Pangolin)
2. Mmamba (Lungfish)
3. Ngeye (Colobus monkey)
4. Njaza (Reedbuck)
5. Ennyange (Cattle egret)
6. Fumbe (Civet cat)
7. Ngonge (Otter)
8. Mpindi (Cowpea)
9. Ngabi Ennyunga (Bushbuck)

==== Kintu migration ====
The Abalasangeye dynasty came to power through the conquests of Kabaka of Buganda ssekabaka Kintu, which are estimated to have occurred sometime between 1200 and 1400 AD.

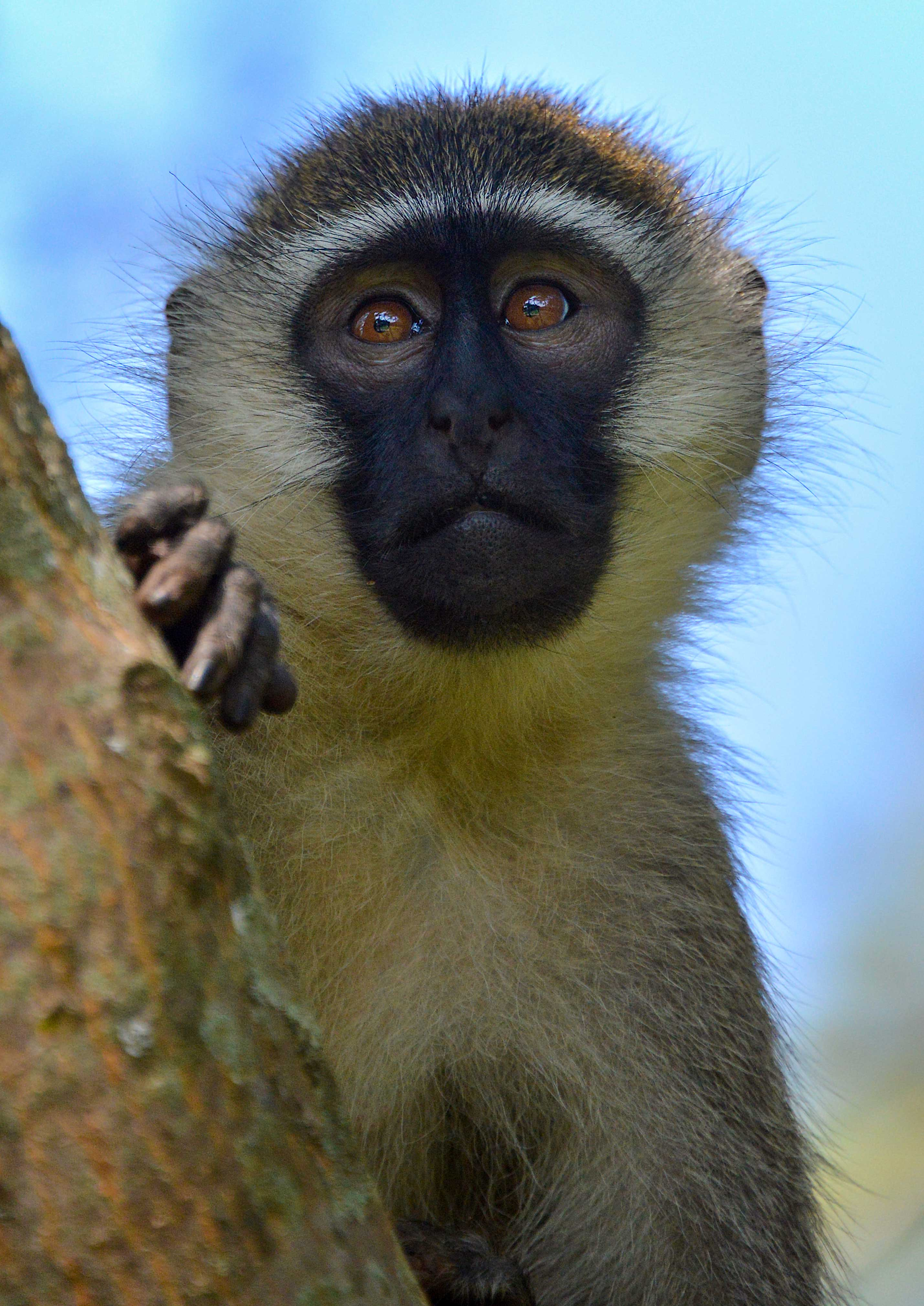
Vervet monkey in Uganda

Thirteen clans that are believed to have come with Kintu:

1. Ekkobe (Liana fruit)
2. Mbwa (Dog)
3. Mpeewo (Oribi antelope)
4. Mpologoma (Lion)
5. Namuŋoona (Pied crow)
6. Ngo (Leopard)
7. Ŋonge (Otter)
8. Nte (cow)
9. Nkejje (Cichlids)
10. Nkima (Vervet monkey)
11. Ntalaganya (Blue duiker)
12. Nvubu (Hippopotamus)
13. Nvuma (Pearl)

The descendants of the Basimba people (also known as Bashimba) which is a Bisa and Ambo nickname of the Clan of the leopards, the bena Ngo in Zambia, who settled at Mpogo, Sironko District, are among the Ngo Clan group that come along with Kabaka Kato Kintu in his immigration.

==== Kato Kimera migration ====
Around 1370 AD another wave of immigration began, assisted by Kabaka Kimera, who was the son of Omulangira Kalemeera. Kabaka Kimera was born in Kibulala, and returned to Buganda with Jjumba of the Nkima clan and other Buganda elders.

These eleven clans are:

1. Bugeme
2. Butiko (Mushrooms)
3. Kasimba (Genet)
4. Kayozi (Jerboa)
5. Kibe (Fox)
6. Mbogo (Buffalo)
7. Musu/Omusu (Edible rat)
8. Ngabi Ensamba (Antelope)
9. Nkerebwe (Jungle Shrew)
10. Nsuma (snout fish)
11. Nseenene (Copiphorini)

== Culture and society ==
The adjective Kiganda is usually used in reference to the Baganda culture.

=== Names ===
The surnames of the Baganda are unique and with a few exceptions depend on one's clan.

==== Clan-based naming ====
Every Muganda must belong to a clan (Ekika).

This is usually his or her father's clan. The only exception to this is the Kabaka (King) who belongs to the mother's clan. This ensures that every clan has a chance to produce the next Kabaka(King). Names of Baganda vary depending on one's biological gender (male or female).

Therefore, each clan will have a list of at least 20 boys' surnames and 20 girls' surnames from which one can pick a surname. Therefore, one's surname (last name) will give a clue to which clan they belong as well as their biological gender. The exceptions to this are a woman's married name (which she inherits from her husband) as well as unique names given to twins and their immediate siblings or Royals (first born sons and first born daughters).

For instance, the name Nsubuga is given to a male from the Mmamba Gabunga clan and the name Nansubuga is given to a female from the Mmamba Gabunga clan.

Also a "naturalized" Muganda person must pick a clan to belong to and therefore a surname or last name belonging to that clan.

==== Okwalula abaana (naming and confirming children in a clan) ====
In the old days, the Baganda held a ceremony called okwalula abaana at which a child was named and confirmed as a member of the clan. A piece of the child's umbilical cord (that had been saved at the child's birth) was used to confirm belonged to the father or was a result of adultery. Modern ways of doing paternity tests have rendered the old ways obsolete although some parents still keep pieces of the child's umbilical cord. However, taking DNA paternity tests without cause has also become very controversial.

==== Naming of twins ====
The names and titles of people related to twins are unique. The father of twins is called ssaalongo; a mother of twins is nnaalongo. The surname of the older twin is Wasswa if the twin is a boy and Babirye if the older twin is a girl. The surname of the younger twin is Nnakato for a girl and Kato for a boy. Kigongo is the surname given to the boy who was born before the twins and Kizza the surname of the child born right after the twins. Ssaabalongo is another title given to the Kabaka.

The naming and confirmation of twins is more elaborate and involves a lot of drinking, eating, using obscene words, some promiscuity and dancing. This ceremony is called okuzina abalongo. Some of the people who attend these ceremonies may have to go through a cleansing ceremony called okukansira especially if they ended up committing adultery. These customs and rites are not very common these days because Baganda parents who belong to the Abrahamic religions generally consider them evil as they generally involve invoking the old Baganda gods (the Lubaales).

==== Surnames inspired by Kiganda mythology ====
Some surnames given to boys and girls were inspired by mythology or by traditional gods (Lubaale) or events.

Selected boys' names:

- Ddungu
- Kibuuka
- Mukasa
- Musisi
- Musoke
- Wamala

Selected girls' names:

- Nnagaddya (or Nagaddya)
- Nnagajja (or Nagajja)
- Nnakayaga (or Nakayaga)
- Nnakimu (or Nakimu)
- Nnamirembe (or Namirembe)
- Nnamukasa (or Namukasa)
- Nnamusoke (or Namusoke)
- Nnamusisi (or Namusisi)

=== Marriage ===
All members of a clan are believed to have a common ancestor. This means that they are siblings if they are from the same generation (roughly same age) or can be considered parents or children if they are from different generations, and so it's taboo for them to marry each other. They are therefore expected to marry someone from another clan, clan Exogamy, (or tribe or nationality as long as they are not a Muganda of the same clan). This has even been held up in a court of law (i.e. there's a precedent in law) in the famous case of Bruno L. Kiwawu vs Ivan Serunkuma and Juliet Namazzi in May 2007. All three people involved, the girl's father, Kiwawu, the "boy", Sserunkuuma and the "girl", Namazzi belong to the same clan, the Ndiga (Sheep) clan. A few exceptions exist especially among the members of the large Mmamba clan. On occasion, these have been known to intermarry. This taboo on marrying someone who belongs to the same clan as you normally supersedes religious, national and international marriage laws.

In Kiganda society, women married at a later age than most other African societies, rarely marrying before the age of 20. Both bridewealth and virginity were necessary to a fully honourable marriage. A married woman's status depended on her ancestry and the rank of her husband. Women gained respect by their control of the household economy and by their fertility; loss of a baby was a woman's most common reason for suicide.

Traditional Kiganda marriage involves several rites and customs that must be performed for a marriage to occur. Among the Baganda, for a prospective couple to marry each other, their parents must belong to different clans since members of the same clan are considered siblings. This is usually not a problem if the bride-to-be or suitor is not a Muganda, as that would generally mean that they are not siblings based on clan. Key ceremonies include:

A visit to the bride-to-be's paternal aunt, Ssenga
This visit is very important because it's the Ssenga who forwards the suitor's letter of intent to marry to her brother, the bride-to-be's father. In the past, the Ssenga would usually do a basic background check on the suitor to find out whether he is a suitable groom for her niece and extended family. She would also arrange for the next meeting between the suitor and the bride-to-be's parents.
Okukyala (visit to the bride-to-be's parents)
The visit to the bride-to-be's parent's home is an opportunity for the parents to meet the suitor and to discuss issues such as bride price (omutwalo), and to set the date of the introduction ceremony (Okwanjula).
Okwanjula (introduction ceremony
The introduction ceremony is held at the bride-to-be's parents home. At the introduction ceremony, the Ssenga formally introduces the suitor to the rest of her extended family (parents, uncles, aunts, cousins, etc). The suitor through his representative (Omwogezi) formally asks for the bride-to-be's hand in marriage (i.e to be born into the bride-to-be's family). If the bride-to-be agrees to marry the suitor, then a blood brotherhood pact (okutta omukago) between the two families is made and the marriage is formally agreed to. These days, to avoid blood-borne diseases, no blood is exchanged, just coffee beans.
Akasiki (bachelor or bachelorette party)
These are roughly equivalent to the bachelor and bachelorette parties in Western weddings and they are held the night before the wedding reception, Embaga.
Kaasuze katya
This is a ceremony held the morning of the wedding reception. The suitor's and some of his relatives bring some items (usually paraffin, matches, funnel and a lamp for the parents) to the bride-to-be's parent's home and ask the parents for permission to formally take the bride-to-be with them.
Embaga (wedding reception/party)
This is the wedding reception or party, and is generally funded by the suitor's family and friends. In modern times, it's held at a public place such as a hotel.
Okuzza omuzigo (show of appreciation)
This is a ceremony that usually occurs after the brides first return from a visit to her parents home. In this ceremony, the bride takes items like chickens and butter (omuzigo) back to her husband as a sign of appreciation for him.
Okugenda mu kisenge (honeymoon)
This is roughly equivalent to the Western honeymoon. After the wedding, the new bride goes to her new home for roughly six days.
Registration with the state
Getting marriage certificate from state brings several benefits to the married couple including better legal protection. In Uganda, this is done based on the Marriage Act.

In modern times, not all of the above ceremonies are performed. This is especially true for couples that have accepted the Abrahamic religions. Some of the ceremonies are skipped or merged together. A number of the ceremonies are usually required (as proof of consent) if one is to register the marriage with the state.

=== Ekitiibwa ===
Ekitiibwa, which translates as honour, glory, prestige, dignity, respect, reverence, or pomp, is the greatest ideal and the most sought-after attribute of the Baganda. It has an importance comparable to that of "face" found in societies such as China and Japan. In contrast to comparable notions in highly stratified societies like the Kingdom of Rwanda, however, ekitiibwa was not conferred by birth. It was a right to respect for which all people openly competed. Baganda could commit suicide from shame if discovered in theft or cowardice. A brave man was expected to go to execution with silent composure as it was believed that "everyone should endure pain with stoicism".

Grudges were rarely forgotten, a Ganda proverb says "He who makes you shed tears, you make him shed blood."

The Kabaka (King) was Fount of honour (the ultimate source of honour and authority). The Kabaka was able to bestow administrative and military positions to individuals based on his discretion. He conferred them in return for loyalty and service so that Buganda's politics centred on competition for office and its associated ekitiibwa, a competition open in principle to any man of talent and courage.

=== Clothing ===
The traditional dress of the Baganda women is the Gomesi and the Kanzu for the Baganda men.

The traditional fabric used by the Baganda is barkcloth (Luganda: Lubugo), which is made from the bark of the Mutuba tree.

=== Religion ===
According to the 2002 Census of Uganda, 42.7% of Baganda are Roman Catholic, 27.4% are Anglican (Church of Uganda), 23% are Muslim, and 4.3% are Pentecostal. As shown by the official statistics, the bulk of the Baganda in Uganda belong to the new Abrahamic religions and a few to the old traditional Kiganda religion. In practice, some Baganda officially belong to one of the Abrahamic religions but also secretly follow the old traditional Kiganda religion.

==== Creation myth ====
The Baganda creation myth says that the first man on earth (and Buganda in particular) was Kintu. Kintu married Nnambi, the daughter of the god Ggulu. The Baganda are the descendants of Kintu and Nnambi. According to this myth, Walumbe, Nnambi's jealous brother is responsible for all human disease, sickness (Luganda: olumbe) and death on earth. Another brother, Kayikuuzi, tried to protect humans from Walumbe but failed. To this day, Kayikuuzi still tries to capture Walumbe from the underground where he hides and take him back home. Based on this creation myth, the Baganda are called abaana ba Nnambi (Nnambi's children).

=== Dispute resolution ===
A cultural court called Ekkooti ya Kisekwa (Kisekwa's court), handles disputes including those among the clans or member of the clan. For instance, disputes related to who becomes the next clan head (Omutaka) when the previous one dies or becomes incapacitated. The title of the head of this court is Kisekwa.

If someone is not satisfied with the court's ruling, then they can appeal all the way up to the Kabaka who is the final arbiter of cases coming out of this court.

Below Kisekwa's court are usually sub section courts at the Ssiga and at times Lunyiriri and Mutuba levels. At each one of these levels, a cultural court's decision can be appealed to the higher level.

Although these courts have some power. Ultimate judicial power lies with the Judiciary of the country. In Uganda's case, that would be the Magistrate's court, High court, etc. From time to time, one who is not satisfied by the cultural courts will sue in a national high court.

=== Death ===
Among the Baganda, death is traditionally believed to ultimately be caused by the mythical Walumbe. And when a person dies, they join their ancestors in the spiritual realm. However it is believed that the deceased (omufu) can still influence the lives of the living. Therefore a number of rites and customs must be performed or observed to avoid angering the deceased and to comfort the bereaved. In some cases, haunting, possession or unexplained illness is believed to be caused by an ancestor's ghost that is unhappy because the living family members have failed to maintain their grave or to appoint an heir/heiress or perform a specific rite or custom. The specific rites and customs that are followed will depend on who the deceased was, religious beliefs and sometimes on how they died. So there will be some differences in how the death of a royal (a king, queen, prince, princess, queen mother), a father, a mother, a child, a twin, a spinster, a fetus, a nonfamily member who died at another person's home, a suicide, one who died from a highly infectious disease like Ebola or Covid-19, etc is handled.

==== Death announcement (Okubika) ====
Announcing (Okubika or Okubikira) the death to relatives, in-laws, friends, colleagues and the local community is one of the first things that is done since they are all expected to take part in the wake and/or burial of the deceased. Among the Baganda, wakes and burials are a communal events, do not require an invitation and are open to everyone.

==== The wake ====
A wake is usually held at the home of the deceased. The bereaved will usually congregate at the deceased's home. At the wake, the bereaved will meet to comfort each other, to view the body, watch over the body and to make preparations for the burial, meals for the mourners, and other rites and customs. The body is usually placed in the sitting room. The mood at a Kiganda wake is normally somber with occasional loud wailing from the bereaved, music, singing and prayers. The wake will usually last at least one day to allow people who may be several hours or even days away (for instance, abroad) to arrive and attend the burial. If the deceased was the head of the household, then a bonfire (ogwoto) is lit in the Luggya to keep the bereaved warm at night. Making the bonfire is called okukuma olumbe. Usually the deceased spends at least one last night in his or her home. Spending the night at the wake is called okusula ku mufu. This custom is very important in supporting and comforting the bereaved especially the immediate members of the household like the widow, widower and the orphans who would otherwise have to spend the whole night alone watching over the body of the deceased. The main exceptions to the duration of the wake and the rites and customs mentioned above occur if the deceased committed suicide, was stillborn, was a fetus in a miscarriage, or belonged to one of the Abrahamic religions that require one to be buried on the day they died.

==== Preparation of the body ====
Preparation of the body for viewing and eventual burial is usually done at a funeral home or the home of the deceased. This usually involves cleaning (okunaaza omufu), straightening (okugolola), embalming and then dressing up (okwambaza) the body or wrapping/shrouding the body (okuzinga omufu) in cloth (in white sheets or barkcloth).

==== Taking leave of the dead (Okuziraga) ====
Sometimes ritual cleansing of the body (okunaaza omufu) and/or okuziraga. Okuziraga is rubbing some oil or water from a sponge on the forehead or face of the deceased. This ritual is performed by the orphans, widow and widower. The sponge is usually made from the core of banana stems. In some cases, the sponge is used to clean one's hands after touching the oil and not the deceased's forehead.

==== Last funeral rites (Okwabya Olumbe) ====
Okwabya Olumbe (bursting or casting the spirit of death away) marks the end of the mourning period and is usually held days or months after the burial of the deceased.

==== Inheritance ====
The "heir" (Omusika in Luganda), a vital, traditionally male figure chosen to represent the deceased, manage family affairs, and inherit the spiritual responsibility of the lineage, often confirmed during the final funeral ritesalso known as (Okwabya olumbe). He is usually chosen by family elders or by a will left by the deceased, wrapped in bark cloth (L

ubugo), and given a spear, in a household headed by a single mother or a widow, the family property is not owned by the cultural heir. Among the Baganda, an heiress is a biological female who inherits the cultural position of a deceased woman (i.e. sister or mother). In ancient times, this heiress, if she were single, could become the widower's wife as it was assumed that she would love her deceased sister's children as if they were her own.

=== Miscellaney ===
In Buganda (Baganda culture) are strictly observed social, dietary, and traditional regulations, often rooted in clan, gender, or, spiritual beliefs. Key taboos include strict prohibition of same-clan marriage (except the Mamba clan), restrictions on women eating certain foods like chicken and eggs, and strict etiquette regarding seating, greeting, and dress codes. See §§ Totems and Marriage.

== Appearance ==
John Roscoe noted that the Baganda varied in their heights, with some being just a little over 5 feet tall and others being over six feet tall (the warrior Tebukoza Kyambalango was 6'6" tall). The anthropologist Lucy Mair further describes the appearance of the Baganda:

The people are dark-brown skinned, woolly-haired, and reasonably tall. One is struck by their superior physique after the Kikuyu whom one sees on the journey through Kenya; but they did not attain to the tremendous stature of the Hima in the other kingdoms. It would be impossible to describe a "typical" Baganda face. Some are exactly like the full moon, some have Roman noses; my best informant made me think of one of Dürer's Four Apostles, and his brother had a remarkably triangular face which he had passed on to all his children. A light skin is not taken as a mark of noble birth or Hima origin, but as a sign of delicate health. Their bright eyes and ready smile, the fact that a dark skin does not show minor defects and makes teeth look better than they deserve, and, in the case of women, their dignified walk make them very pleasing to the eye.

Men rarely kept facial hair–they plucked it out or shaved it off. Women were careful to keep their armpit hair shaved, unless their husbands were at war or on a journey, (custom forbade married women from shaving until the husband returned).

John Roscoe noted that "The Baganda are the only Bantu tribe in Eastern Equatorial Africa who do not mutilate their persons; they neither extract their teeth nor pierce their ear lobes, nor practise the rite of circumcision; in fact, they are most careful to avoid scarifications of any kind." The Baganda did indeed abhor and forbade any mutilation of the body, and regarded circumcision as a violation of their traditional customs.

When Speke prepared for his first audience with King Mutesa of Baganda, he put on his finest clothes, but admitted that he "cut a poor figure in comparison with the dressy Baganda [who] wore neat bark cloaks resembling the best yellow corduroy cloth, crimp and well set, as if stiffened with starch". The Baganda were careful (even described as prudish) about the covering of the body, people covered their body head to toe and nudity was seen as disgusting and shameful. Bark cloth (olubugo) was the most common form of attire used throughout Buganda. It was made from at least 20 tree species, with the best quality cloth being from the Mutuba tree, which was extensively cultivated in Buganda and considered the most valuable tree after the Matoke. Different species of trees yielded different colors and textures, from yellow to sandy brown to dark red-brown. The finest quality was the rusty brown cloth (called Kimote). A specific species of tree that yielded a white cloth was reserved for the Kabaka (king). Barkcloth also had other uses such as bedding and wrapping of goods

== History ==
=== Early history ===
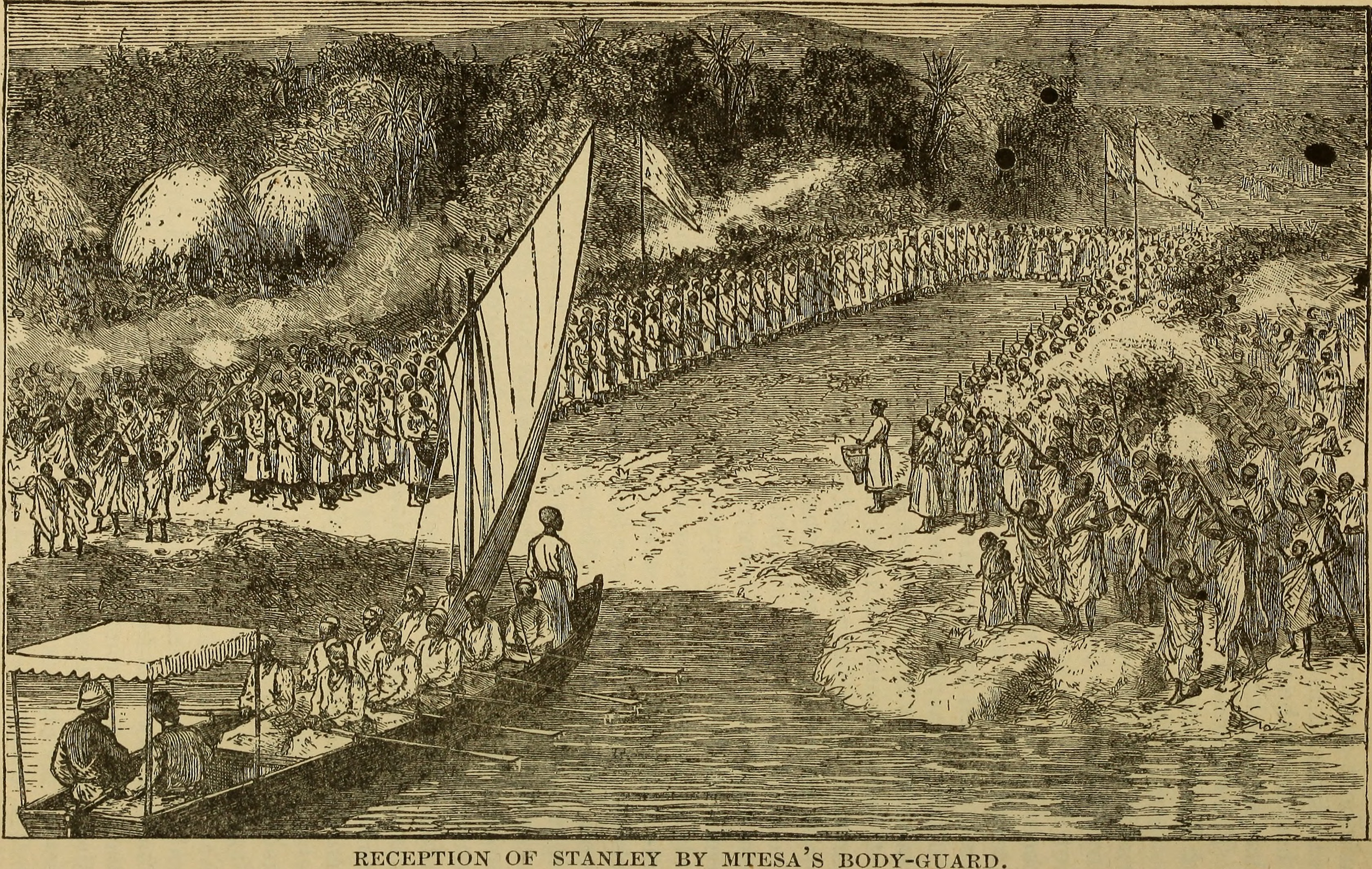

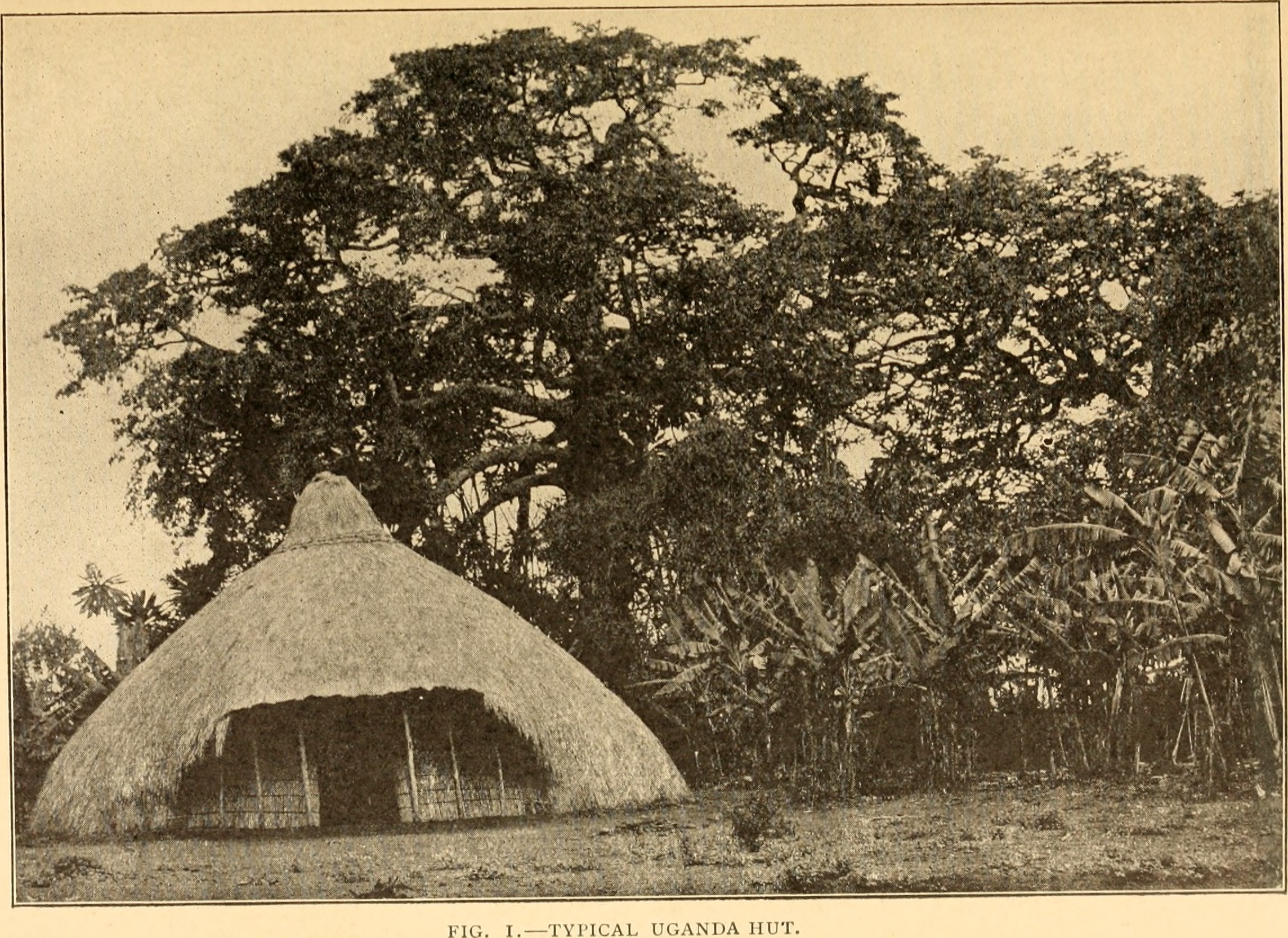
Kabaka Muteesa I's bodyguard receives an invited Stanley (1875) (top). The Baganda house (1911) (bottom) .

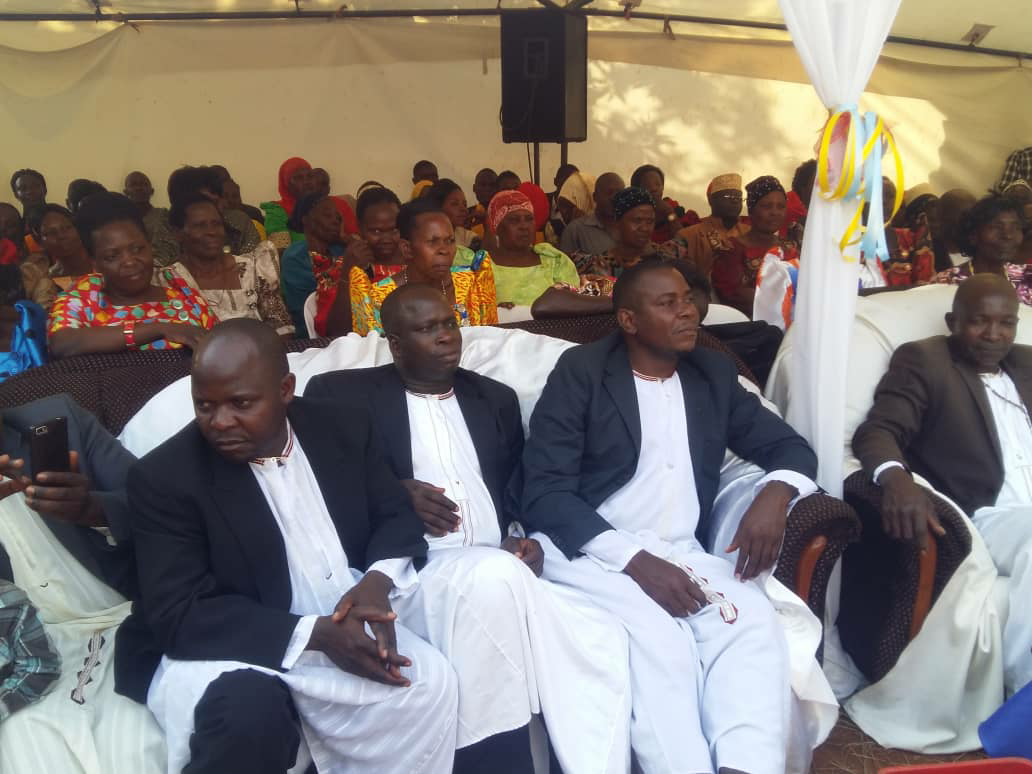
The Baganda men traditional wear at an introduction ceremony.

As for the founding of the Kingdom of the Ganda (Buganda), the most widely acknowledged account is that it was founded by Kato Kintu. This Kato Kintu is different from the mythical Kintu, as he is generally accepted as a historical figure who founded Buganda and became its first 'Kabaka', adopting the name Kintu in reference to the legend of Kintu to establish his legitimacy as a ruler. He was successful in unifying what had previously been a number of scattered clans to form a strong kingdom.

As such by the 18th century, the formerly dominant Bunyoro kingdom was being eclipsed by Buganda. Consolidating their efforts behind a centralized kingship, the Baganda (people of Buganda) shifted away from defensive strategies and toward expansion. By the mid 19th century, Buganda had doubled and redoubled its territory conquering much on Bunyoro and becoming the dominant state in the region. Newly conquered lands were placed under chiefs nominated by the king. Buganda's armies and the royal tax collectors traveled swiftly to all parts of the kingdom along specially constructed roads which crossed streams and swamps by bridges and viaducts. On Lake Victoria (which the Baganda call Ennyanja Nnalubaale), a royal navy of outrigger canoes, commanded by an admiral, Gabunga, who was chief of the Mmamba (Lungfish) Gabunga clan, could transport Baganda commandos to raid any shore of the lake.

=== Arrival and interference of European colonialists ===
The explorer John Speke, searching for the source of the Nile, had visited Buganda in the 1860s and back home in Britain givewithlowing account of the advanced Bantu kingdom he had found in East Africa, and fellow explorers as well as colonialists were to soon follow him into the kingdom.

The journalist Henry Morton Stanley visited Buganda in 1875 and painted a good picture of the kingdom's strength, as well as providing an estimate of Buganda troop strength. At Buganda's capital, Stanley found a well-ordered town of about 80,000 surrounding the king's palace, which was situated atop a commanding hill. A wall more than four kilometers in circumference surrounded the palace compound, which was filled with grass-roofed houses, meeting halls, and storage buildings. At the entrance to the court burned the royal gombolola (fire), which would only be extinguished when the Kabaka died. Thronging the grounds were foreign ambassadors seeking audiences, chiefs going to the royal advisory council, messengers running errands, and a corps of young pages, who served the Kabaka while training to become future chiefs. For communication across the kingdom, the messengers were supplemented by drum signals.

In 1876, Christian missionaries started entering the kingdom of Buganda to introduce the Baganda people to Christianity. Between 1881 and 1890, the Baganda people started to convert to both Islam and Christianity.

To Europeans, the Baganda belonged to a distinct political and social order and were thus privileged over other ethnic and cultural groups in the region. Early travel, missionary, and colonial accounts often called the Baganda the "most advanced and intelligent of all central African societies". The British in their colonial ventures were much impressed with the government as well as the society and economic organization of Buganda, which they ranked as the most advanced nation they had encountered in East Africa and ranked it with other highly advanced nations like the ones they had encountered in Zimbabwe and Nigeria.

clothed, sedentary, civilized, and—martial. In the eyes of the military British administrators, the Baganda had a fine military tradition even as they themselves did. In certain ways, then, for the British, the Baganda were "people more like us."

Buganda was, indeed, an aggressive empire building monarchy at the moment when the British entered the region; other African peoples "paled into insignificance when compared with the Baganda."

In the turn of the century, "flush of enthusiasm for capitalism, expansion, and development", the Baganda were singled out for their initiative in seeking out markets, getting an education, and, above all, for their money-consciousness. Other Ugandan peoples were then viewed as being in a "pre-monetary stage."

Under Kabaka Mwanga II, Buganda became a protectorate in 1894. This did not last, and the Kabaka declared war on Britain on July 6, 1897. He was defeated at the Battle of Buddu on July 20 of the same year. He fled to German East Africa, where he was arrested and interned at Bukoba. The Kabaka later escaped and led a rebel army to retake the kingdom before being defeated once again in 1898 and being exiled to the Seychelles.

Kabaka Mwanga II of Buganda was allowed near complete autonomy and a position as overlord of the other kingdoms. While in exile, Mwanga II was received into the Anglican Church, and baptized with the name Danieri (Daniel). He spent the rest of his life in exile. He died in 1903, aged 35 years. In 1910, his remains were repatriated and buried at Kasubi.

The war against Kabaka Mwanga II was expensive, and the new commissioner of Uganda in 1900, Sir Harry H. Johnston, had orders to establish an efficient administration and to levy taxes as quickly as possible. Sir Johnston approached the chiefs in Buganda with offers of jobs in the colonial administration in return for their collaboration. The chiefs did so but expected their interests (preserving Buganda as a self-governing entity, continuing the royal line of kabakas, and securing private land tenure for themselves and their supporters) to be met.
