= Augustine Kyazze =

Ugandan general

- Born: 1961 (age 64–65); Mpigi District, Uganda
- Citizenship: Uganda
- Occupation: Military Officer
- Years active: 1987 – present
- Known for: Military Matters

Brigadier Augustine Kamyuka Kyazze, is a Ugandan military officer in the Uganda People's Defence Forces (UPDF). He currently serves as the Deputy Chief of Logistics and Engineering in the UPDF, responsible for Engineering. In the past, he has served as Commander of the Armoured Component for AMISOM.

== Early life ==
He was born in 1961 in Mpigi District, in Uganda's Central Region.

== Military education ==
Augustine Kyazze joined the Uganda military in 1987. In 1997, he was commissioned. His military training included the following courses, among others: 1. A Cadet Officer Course 2. A Course for Tank Platoon Commanders 3. A Course in Armoured Command and Tactics 4. A Tank Battalion Commander’s Course and 5. A Senior Command and Staff College Course.

== Military career ==
Among the assignments that Brigadier Kyazze has undertaken over the years, are the following: (a) Commanding Officer of a Tank Unit (b) Acting Brigade Commander Armoured Brigade (c) Chief Instructor Kalama Armoured Warfare Training School, Kabamba, Mubende District, Central Uganda. (d) Commander of the Armoured Component for AMISOM and (e) Deputy Chief of Logistics and Engineering In the UPDF, responsible for Engineering, his current assignment.

In is current position, he stresses the importance of troop training, having the right equipment, the maintenance of discipline, professionalism and troop cohesion.

== Other considerations ==
Brigadier Augustine Kyazze is married with children. He is of the Christian faith. He maintains a farm in Bukulula Sub-county, Kalungu District, in the Greater Masaka sub-region of the Buganda Region of Uganda.

== See also ==
- Yoweri Museveni
- Uganda People's Defence Forces
- Crispus Kiyonga
