= Exploits Valley High =

- Exploits Valley High Crest
- Grand FaIls-Windsor; Canada

Information
- Type: High School
- Motto: United As One
- Established: 2005
- School district: Newfoundland and Labrador English School District
- Principal: Paul Lewis
- Faculty: 43 (As of September 2026)
- Grades: 10-12
- Enrollment: 283 (As of September 2026)
- Colors: Burgundy, Navy
- Athletics: Basketball Volleyball Ball Hockey Ice Hockey Softball Badminton Pickle Ball
- Sports: Basketball Ice Hockey
- Mascot: Eagle
- Feeder schools: Avoca Collegiate, Badger Exploits Valley Intermediate, Grand Falls-Windsor
- Website: https://evh.nlesd.ca/

Exploits Valley High is a high school located at 392 Grenfell Heights in Grand Falls-Windsor, Newfoundland and Labrador, Canada. The administrators of the school are Paul Lewis and Glenn Casey. The school operates under the Newfoundland and Labrador English School District and has roughly 43 faculty members and 500 students.

== Sports and recreation ==
Sports the school currently has teams that include:

- Ice Hockey
- Volleyball
- Basketball
- Softball
- Soccer
- Badminton

The school hosts many other programs including

- School Band
- Musical Theatre
- School Leadership
- LGBTQ club
- Tech Club
- Drama Club

== Use of building ==
- Exploits Valley High, Grades 10-12 (2005–present)
- Grenfell Intermediate, Grades 7-8 (1999–2005)
- Bursey Memorial Collegiate (before 1999)

== Staff Members ==
This list is as of September 2026

- Tracy Andrews - English
- Dianne Ball - IRT
- Deborah Ball - Core French
- Sharona Belben - Guidance
- Stephanie Boone - Science
- Denika Card - IRT
- Tracy Card - Secretary (General / PowerSchool)
- Glenn Casey - Vice Principal
- Jennifer Clarke - Music
- Michelle Cooke-Stone - TLA
- Danielle Evans - Science Department Head
- Genny Fudge - IRT
- Sandra Goudie - IRT
- Carolyn Hamlyn - Mathematics
- Jennifer Hancock - Mathematics
- Michael Hicks - Mathematics Department Head
- Michael Hodder - Athletics Director
- Lianne Hogg - English Department Head
- Nathan Hynes - Technology Coordinator / Education
- Jocelyn Ivany - Art
- Paula Janes - English
- Zachary Lane - Social Studies
- Jennifer Lewis - IRT Department Head
- Paul Lewis - Principal
- Danielle Mills - Science
- Noah Moulton - English
- Jamie Noel - Mathematics & Physics
- Chad Oldford - Social Studies Department Head
- Dawn Oldford - IRT
- Tina Reid - Secretary (Financial)
- Lisa Rowsell - Career and Nutrition
- Shannon Sartor - French Immersion
- Bradley Sharpe - English
- Scott Simms - English and Drama
- Cameron Snow - PASS
