= Holy Spirit High School (Newfoundland) =

High school in Newfoundland, Canada

Coordinates: 47.52476°N 52.94766°W

Holy Spirit High School is a high school in Conception Bay South, Newfoundland and Labrador. The school is part of the English School District of Newfoundland.

Holy Spirit High School is part of the Newfoundland and Labrador English School District. The Board employs approximately 4,000 full-time equivalent teachers, in addition to student support, secretarial and maintenance personnel. The school has an enrollment of over 850 students and offers programs in Grade 9 and Levels I, II, III, and IV. Prescribed programs are presently offered in English and French immersion.

Holy Spirit High School is located in the Town of Conception Bay South, and serves students in that community and in the Town of Paradise. The school delivers programs under the jurisdiction of the English School District. Holy Spirit High runs classes in English and French literacy, mathematics, science, technology, social studies and the fine arts as program priorities.
