= Gander Collegiate =

Location
- 3 Magee Road; Gander, Newfoundland, A1V 1W1; Canada
- 48.961°N 54.6348°W

Information
- School type: Senior High
- School board: NLSchools
- Faculty: 27
- Grades: 10-12
- Enrolment: 412
- Language: English
- Team name: Concordes
- Website: www.gandercollegiate.com

Gander Collegiate is a high school in Gander, Newfoundland and Labrador. It currently houses grades 10 through 12 (levels I through III). The high school in Gander is directly next to St. Paul's Intermediate School.

== September 11, 2001 ==
As a result of the September 11, 2001 attacks and the subsequent grounding of international flights, Gander Collegiate became one of many buildings that had to be converted into makeshift hostels. Specifically, passengers of Lufthansa Flight LH400 became residents of Gander Collegiate during this time. Necessities such as food and drink were provided through the cafeteria while television coverage of events and access to computers and internet was provided through the school's facilities.
