= Gander (surname) =

Gander is a surname. Notable people with the name include:

- Forrest Gander (born 1956), American poet, author, critic and translator
- Joe Gander (1888-1954), Australian politician
- L Marsland Gander (1902-1986), British journalist, war correspondent and radio and television correspondent
- Philippa Gander, New Zealand academic and sleep researcher
