= Funeral food =

Common meal after a funeral

An 18th-century British wake

Funeral food is the food and drink that features at a funeral or wake, which has been ascribed practical, spiritual, and symbolic attributes. It has often appeared in feasts, practiced in cultures across the world and across time. In the Christian world, food rites around funerals have historically been dictated by the church, even as folk practices remained widespread. In some cultures, certain foods are associated closely with funerals and death. Sometimes, this can create cultural taboos, wherein cooking a dish outside of funeral is considered a breach of norms.

== History ==
Food has figured in observances around death since ancient times in cultures around the world. This has often taken the form of feasts accompanying funerals. These have served spiritual purposes, based in the idea that food at a funeral and wake could feed the dead on a long and arduous journey to the afterlife or underworld. In practical terms, attendees would often have travelled far to be at the funeral, arriving at a destination where restaurants and eateries were often much more rare than they are today. Sometimes, they have also served symbolic purposes, appearing as a show of the high regard that mourners held the dead in.

The notion of funeral food feeding the dead on their journey to the afterlife has been observed across societies. In Ancient Rome, mourners would build tubes that fed into graves. When visiting, they poured offerings of food and drink into the grave, in a process understood to feed the dead waiting for entry to the afterlife. Early Christians followed such practices, feasting at the graves of their dead to offer nourishment. At times, this meant that kitchens were built into cemeteries themselves to support the preparation of feasts. Hindu Brahmin still offer a rice ball (pinda) every day for 11 days, and 5 on the 12th to keep the soul nourished on its post-death journey.

Among areas observing Christianity, many of the death rites were dictated by the church. Despite this, people have always maintained their own, local rites, often featuring food and drink. In parts of England, Wales, and Scotland from at least the 17th through 19th centuries, one of these practices involved hiring a sin-eater. The sin-eater was a local figure who, for a small fee, would eat bread with either salt or beer that had been or was in proximity to the corpse. By doing this, it was understood that the sins of the dead would transfer into the food, and then into the sin-eater.

== Eating ==
A Kenyan funeral feast

M. F. K. Fisher, the American food writer wrote on the hunger of the grieving in an essay, "S is for Sad" (1949). She described it as a "mysterious appetite that often surges in us when our hearts seem breaking and our lives too bleakly empty".

In Western funeral rites, a gathering often follows the formal funeral service or burial, with food featuring prominently. In the UK and Australasia, these gatherings typically occur in the home or an external venue such as a club or restaurant. In Australia and New Zealand, regardless of the venue, the food is typically old-fashioned and nostalgic, based on the foods served at a morning or afternoon tea; the Australian author Romy Ash likens it to being "fed by grandmas". In contrast, in the US it is more common for mourners to meet after the funeral at church halls. In small towns, food is typically brought to the family, taking the form of covered dishes such as fried chicken or chocolate layer cake. The food writer Michael Lee West positions this as an expression of sympathy and care, avoiding clumsy language and faux pas.

Food rituals around funerals have received significant attention within the field of food cultural studies.

=== List of feasts and rituals ===
- Arvals
- Dukrana
- Lofani
- Refrigerium
- Repast
- Trizna
- Zidqa brikha

== Food and drinks ==
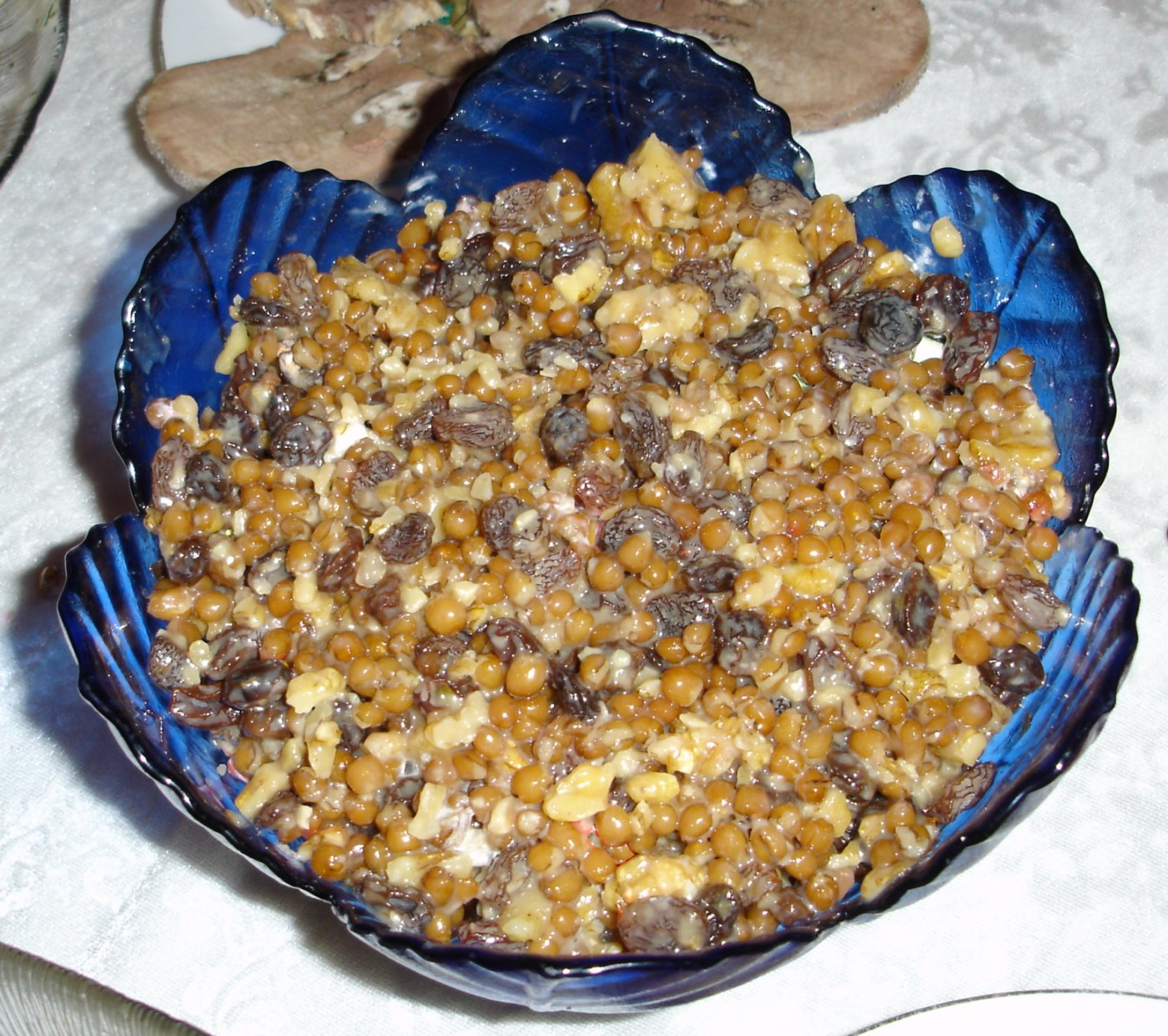
Kolivo

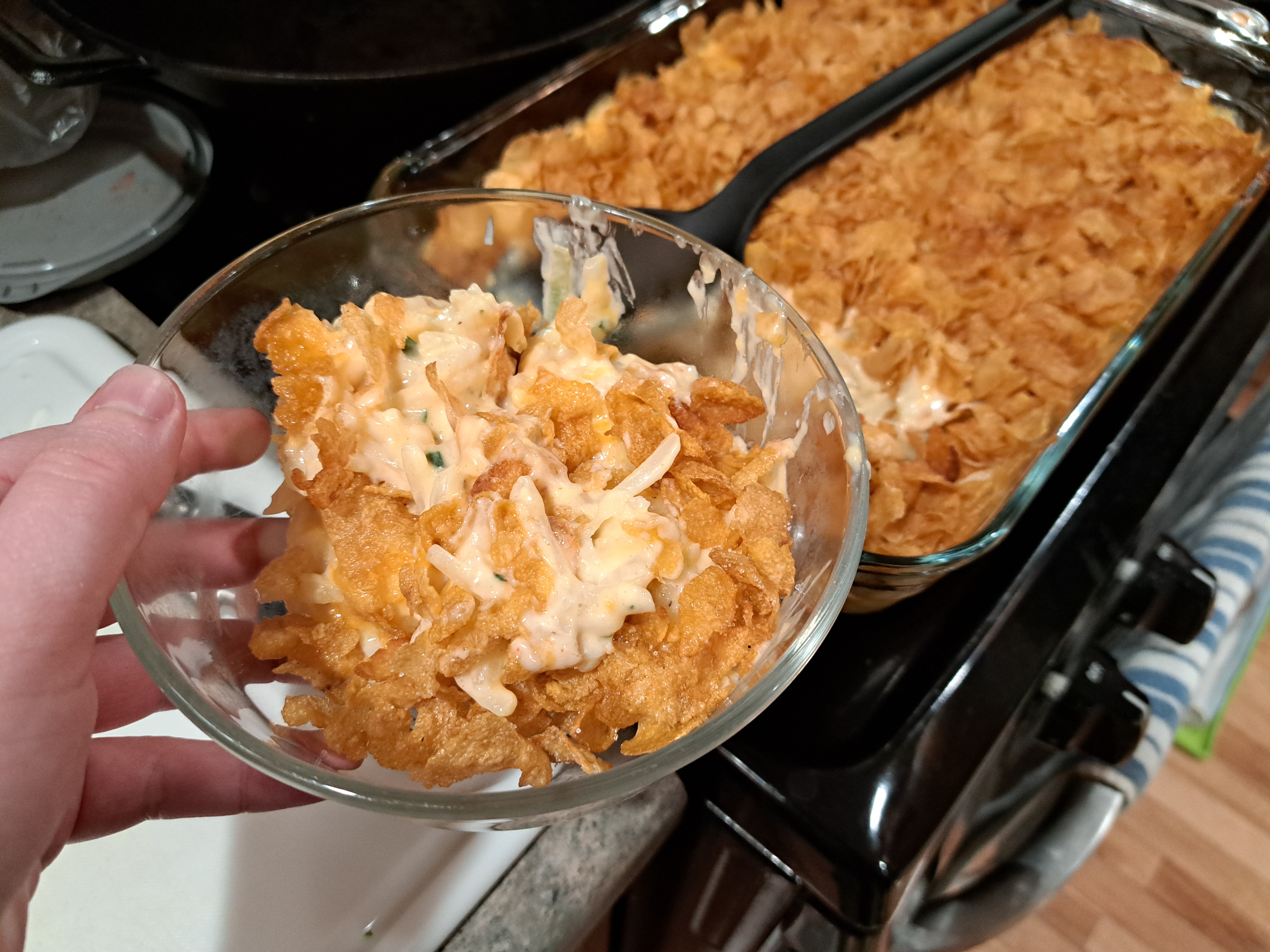
Funeral potatoes

Some of the foods served at funerals are chosen for an association with death. Broad beans are one example. In the Balkans, koliva is another. Koliva is a dish of boiled wheat, nuts, lemon juice and sugar. It is associated with death through the wheat, which is held to symbolise life, and has been integrated into Eastern Orthodox rituals around death. Some are only prepared around funerals, and making them outside of that context can be considered a breach of cultural norms, for instance, the funeral biscuits historically served to mourners in Yorkshire. Among the Pennsylvania Dutch, dried apple pie (schnitz pie in the local vernacular) is another example. Death could arrive at any time of the year. Pies made from dried fruit were accessible even during the winter, when fruits were not in abundance, and the association with death was furthered when dark, dried fruits, such as raisins, were employed.

Alcoholic beverages are sometimes consumed ritually around the funeral process. Among the Vikings, beer was consumed on the seventh day after death to mark the anniversary. Alcohol is associated with funeral observations among the Irish. At times, this is rooted in the physiological effects of alcohol, as it numbs the grieving mind.

While modern cookbooks often instruct in how to cook for special occasions, it is rare that food to be eaten at funerals appears. Many of the cookbooks that do are from the American South, although exceptions exist elsewhere, such as in Nigella Lawson's Feast (2004). In Thailand, a cookbook composed by the deceased before death is distributed to attendees.

=== List ===
- Dead-cakes
- Dried apple pie
- Funeral biscuit
- Funeral potatoes
- Koliva
- Pan de ánimas
- Pinda
- Rakia

== See also ==
- Ancestor worship
- Last meal

== Sources ==
- Brien, Donna Lee (June 2013). ""Concern and sympathy in a pyrex bowl": Cookbooks and Funeral Foods". M/C Journal. 16 (3). doi:10.5204/mcj.655.
- Cann, Candi K (2018a). "The Role of Food in Bereavement and Memorialization". In Cann, Candi K (ed.). Dying to Eat: Cross-Cultural Perspectives on Food, Death, and the Afterlife. Material Worlds. Lexington, Kentucky: The University Press of Kentucky. ISBN 978-0-8131-7469-3.
- Cann, Candi K (2018b). "Shifting Landscapes of the Role of Food in Grief and Mourning". In Cann, Candi K (ed.). Dying to Eat: Cross-Cultural Perspectives on Food, Death, and the Afterlife. Material Worlds. Lexington, Kentucky: The University Press of Kentucky. ISBN 978-0-8131-7469-3.
- Davidson, Alan (2014a) [1999]. "Funeral foods". In Davidson, Alan; Jaine, Tom (eds.). The Oxford Companion to Food (3rd ed.). Oxford, Oxfordshire and New York: Oxford University Press. ISBN 978-1-78785-552-6.
- Davidson, Alan (2014b) [1999]. "Vareno zhito". In Davidson, Alan; Jaine, Tom (eds.). The Oxford Companion to Food (3rd ed.). Oxford, Oxfordshire and New York: Oxford University Press. ISBN 978-1-78785-552-6.
- Jaine, Tom (2014) [1999]. "Food history". In Davidson, Alan; Jaine, Tom (eds.). The Oxford Companion to Food (3rd ed.). Oxford, Oxfordshire and New York: Oxford University Press. ISBN 978-1-78785-552-6.
- Johnson, Maria (1980). "Boiled Wheat (and Aşure)". Petits Propos Culinaires. 5: 67–69. doi:10.1558/ppc.30843.
- Lysaght, Patricia (2003). "Death and Burial". In Katz, Solomon H; Weaver, William Woys (eds.). Encyclopedia of Food and Culture. Vol. 1. New York. ISBN 0-684-80568-5.
- Milspaw, Yvonne J (2017). "Food and Cooking". In Bronner, Simon J; Brown, Joshua R (eds.). Pennsylvanía Germans: An Interpretive Encyclopedia. Baltimore, Maryland: Johns Hopkins University Press. ISBN 9781421421384.
- West, Michael Lee (2014). "Funeral Food: From Consuming Passions: A Food-Obsessed Life". In Cognard-Black, Jennifer; Goldthwaite, Melissa A (eds.). Books That Cook: The Making of a Literary Meal. New York and London: New York University Press. ISBN 978-1-4798-3021-3.
