= Arval =

Arval may refer to:

- The Arval Brethren, a body of priests in ancient Rome
- Arvals, a funeral dinner; also a cake served at such feasts
- USS Arval (SP-1045), a US Navy patrol vessel in commission from 1917 to 1919
- Arval, a vehicle financial services provider that is a subsidiary of BNP Paribas
