= Valentin Sedov =

Valentin Vasilyevich Sedov (Валентин Васильевич Седов; 1924–2004) was a prominent Russian archaeologist and historian specializing in the ethnogenesis of the Slavs, the history and culture of Ancient Rus, and the study of early Finno-Ugric and Baltic peoples. Based on his extensive fieldwork around the Russian Plain (particularly in the Pskov region), he developed an up-to-date theory of the origin of the Slavs. He was elected to the Russian Academy of Sciences (2003) and the Latvian Academy of Sciences (1994).

Born into a military family, he entered the Moscow Aviation Institute in 1941 but soon found himself thrust into the crucible of World War II. By summer 1942, he was training at the Gomel Military Infantry School and saw frontline combat as a rifle and machine-gun squad commander. His intellectual awakening came after the Soviet-Japanese War, during a brief stint in Harbin, where he immersed himself in books from Russian émigré libraries, sparking a lifelong passion for history.

After demobilization, Sedov joined the History Faculty of Moscow State University, graduating in 1951 under the mentorship of Artemy Artsikhovsky. He began participating in archaeological expeditions as early as 1947, later organizing digs to the south from Moscow, in Belarus and the Novgorod region.

His 1951–1952 excavations at Peryn near Novgorod resulted in a reconstruction of a Slavic pagan sanctuary (though its accuracy has been disputed). His later work at "Truvor's town" in Izborsk revealed several stages of proto-urban evolution (which he thought was typical for all early East Slavic towns). He prepared a catalogue of long barrows and burial mounds (sopki).

A prolific scholar, Sedov redefined the study of early East Slavic rural life with his monograph on the medieval villages near Smolensk (1960). His interpretations of ritual practices (such as identifying horse skulls beneath Novgorod log houses as sacrificial offerings) contributed to the understanding of the pre-Christian Slavic religion.

Later in life, Sedov developed comprehensive theories of the origin of the Slavs, tracing their emergence from Indo-European roots to medieval statehood in works like The Origin and Early History of the Slavs (1979) and Slavs in Antiquity (1994). He was one of the first to regard the Ilmen Slavs as migrants from the Vistula-Oder basin and proposed some very early dates for the arrival of Slavs in the Moscow and Upper Volga regions. Controversially, he argued for the Slavic identity of such outlying cultures as the Przeworsk settlements in Poland, the Imenkovo culture on the Middle Volga, the late Dyakovo communities near Moscow and even the Merya tribe in the Upper Volga region.

Sedov’s work also raised awareness of the Eastern Balts in the Dnieper and Oka basins. Despite their eventual assimilation by East Slavs, Sedov considered those "forgotten" Baltic peoples a key factor in the emergence of modern Belarusians. He also viewed the Don Slavs (ca. 9th century) as a distinct branch of the East Slavs that was not mentioned in any surviving documents (apart from the Khazar Correspondence).

Sedov's family continued his legacy: his wife Maria (1930–2004), daughter of poet Vladimir Lugovskoy, conducted her own excavations in Opolye (centered on Suzdal), while their son Vladimir, a corresponding member of the Russian Academy of Sciences (2011), specialized in pre-Mongol architecture and art.

Sedov's work was honored with the USSR State Prize (1984), the Zabelin Prize (1994, from the Russian Academy of Sciences), the Demidov Prize (1998), and the State Prize of the Russian Federation (1998).
