= Don Slavs =

The area of the Borschevo culture (associated with the Don Slavs) is shown in blue.

The Don Slavs were a Slavic (presumably East Slavic) tribal group inhabiting the Upper Don region (around the modern-day city of Voronezh) from the 8th to the 10th centuries, when the region was part of the Khazar Khaganate. They are known only from the archaeological record. Their settlements are synonymous with the Borsсhevo archaeological culture.

Absent from Old Russian chronicles, their tribal identity remains debated: they may have been a subgroup of the Vyatichi, a distinct tribe, or part of a broader Slavic migration. Valentin Sedov links them to the enigmatic S-l-viyun people, positioned near the W-n-n-tit (Vyatichi) and S-v-r (Severians) in a famous letter by Khazar ruler Joseph.

The Borschevo culture, marked by fortified settlements like Titchikha, reflects a mixed agrarian and pastoral economy. Villages featured log-and-post dwellings with clay-coated roofs, heated by stone ovens. Agriculture relied on slash-and-burn techniques, supplemented by livestock and hunting. Metalworking thrived using local bog iron, producing tools, weapons, and jewelry. Trade with the Khazars and Byzantium is evidenced by Arab dirhams, glass beads, and imported ceramics. Ritual practices included animal sacrifices. A sanctuary at Vorgolskoe centered around a wooden idol and ritual fires.

Scholars universally admit a Slavic identity of this forest-steppe population but dispute their tribal ties. While material culture shares similarities with the Vyatichi (e.g., ring-fenced barrows), distinctions in pottery and settlement patterns suggest autonomy. Sedov championed their status as a distinct tribe, separate from the later Severians. Burial practices — cremation in urns placed in wooden chambers under earthen mounds — further highlight cultural uniqueness. Their social structure likely revolved around clan-based communities without centralized rule, as evidenced by uniform house sizes and lack of elite tombs.

Their decline in the late 10th century is tied to Svyatoslav’s destruction of the Khazar Khaganate, which destabilized the Pontic-Caspian steppe and triggered Pecheneg incursions, probably forcing the Don Slavs to migrate northward into the Oka River basin. By the end of the 10th century, the Don Slavs abandoned their homeland, possibly merging with Vyatichi settlers in the Oka region.

== See also ==
- List of early Slavic peoples
