= Telling the bees =

Traditional European custom

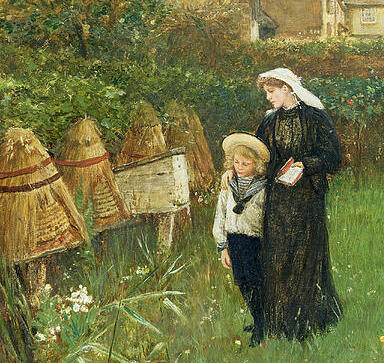
Detail of Charles Napier Hemy's painting The Widow (1895)

Telling the bees is a Western European tradition in which bees are told of important events, including deaths, births, marriages, departures and returns in the keeper's household. The custom is known in England, Ireland, Wales, Germany, Netherlands, France, Switzerland, Bohemia (now in Czechia), as well as parts of the United States. In New England, if the custom was omitted or forgotten and the bees were not "put into mourning," then it was believed a penalty would be paid, such as the bees leaving their hive, stopping the production of honey, or dying.

== History and origins ==
Little is known about the origins of this practice, although there is some unfounded speculation that it is loosely derived from, or perhaps inspired by, ancient Aegean notions about bees' ability to bridge the natural world and the afterlife.

One Lincolnshire report from the mid-19th century notes:

At all weddings and funerals they give a piece of the wedding-cake or funeral biscuit to the bees, informing them at the same time of the name of the party married or dead. If the bees do not know of the former, they become very irate, and sting every body within their reach; and if they are ignorant of the latter they become sick, and many of them die.

After the death of Queen Elizabeth II in 2022, the Royal Beekeeper, John Chapple, told the bees of Buckingham Palace and Clarence House of her death and the accession of King Charles III. Chapple said: "You knock on each hive and say, 'The mistress is dead, but don't you go. Your master will be a good master to you.'"

== Variations ==
=== Death and funerals ===
Following a death in the household, there were several ways in which bees were to be informed and therefore put into proper mourning.

The process is described in the 1901 work of Samuel Adams Drake, A book of New England legends and folk lore in prose and poetry:

...goodwife of the house to go and hang the stand of hives with black, the usual symbol of mourning, she at the same time softly humming some doleful tune to herself.

One such 'tune' from Nottinghamshire had the woman (either a spouse or other caretaker) say "The master's dead, but don't you go; Your mistress will be a good mistress to you." Another similar oration recorded in Germany went "Little bee, our lord is dead; Leave me not in my distress."

Another method involved the male head of the household approaching the hive and knocking gently on it until "the bees' attention was thus secured" and then saying "in a low voice that such or such a person—mentioning the name—was dead." The key to the family home could also be used as a knocker.

One description from the Carolina Mountains in the United States says that "You knock on each hive, so, and say, 'Lucy is dead.'" Bees could also be invited to the funeral.

In cases where the beekeeper themselves had died, food and drink from the funeral would be left by the hive for the bees, including the funeral biscuits and wine. The hive would be lifted a few inches and set down again at the same time as the coffin. The hive might also be rotated to face the funeral procession and draped with mourning cloth.

In some parts of the Pyrenees, a custom includes "burying an old garment belonging to the deceased under the bench where the bee-hives stand, and they never sell, give away, nor exchange the bees of the dead."

Should the bees fail to be told of a death in the family, "serious calamity" would follow, not only for the family in question but also for any person who was to buy the hive. For example, one record from Norfolk tells of a family who bought a hive of bees at auction from a farmer who had recently died and, because the bees had not been "put into mourning for their late master", they were "sickly, and not likely to thrive". However, when the new owners tied a "piece of crepe" to a stick and attached it to the hive the bees soon recovered, an outcome that was "unhesitatingly attributed to their having been put into mourning".

In 1855, Bohemian author Božena Němcová's novel Babička (The Grandmother) ends with the title character saying "When I die do not forget to tell it to the bees, so that they shall not die out!" Němcová's novel, which was filled with folkloric practices from Bohemia, Moravia, Silesia and Slovakia, was based on ethnographic research Němcová had conducted in the region in the mid-nineteenth century.

=== Weddings ===
Although the practice of telling the bees is most commonly associated with funerals, in some regions the bees are to be told of happy events in the family, particularly weddings.

In Westphalia, Germany, one custom held that newly married couples going to their new home must first introduce themselves to the bees or "their married life will be unfortunate."

A 1950s article in the Dundee Courier, Scotland, describes the practice of inviting bees to the wedding. If a wedding occurred in the household, the hive might be decorated and a slice of wedding cake left beside it. Decorating the hives appears to date from the early 19th century.

One tradition in Brittany held that unless beehives were decorated with scarlet cloth at a wedding and the bees allowed to take part in the rejoicing, they would go away.

== In culture ==
The custom has given its name to poems by Deborah Digges, John Ennis, Eugene Field, and Carol Frost. R. T. Smith's poem "Sourwood" also references the custom.

A section from John Greenleaf Whittier's poem "Tell the Bees" describes the practice:

Before them, under the garden wall,
Forward and back
Went, drearily singing, the chore-girl small,
Draping each hive with a shred of black.

Trembling, I listened; the summer sun
Had the chill of snow;
For I knew she was telling the bees of one
Gone on the journey we all must go!

"Stay at home, pretty bees, fly not hence!
Mistress Mary is dead and gone!"

== See also ==
- Bee (mythology)
