= Sin-eater =

Person who consumes a ritual meal for the deceased

A sin-eater is a person who consumes a ritual meal in order to spiritually take on the sins of a deceased person. The food was believed to absorb the sins of a recently deceased person, thus absolving the soul of the deceased.

Cultural anthropologists and folklorists classify sin-eating as a form of burial ritual. It is most commonly associated with Scotland, Ireland, Wales, English counties bordering Wales, and Welsh culture.

== Attestations ==
=== History ===
While there have been analogous instances of sin-eaters throughout history, the questions of how common the practice was, when it was practiced, and what the interactions between sin-eaters, common people, and religious authorities were remain largely unstudied by folklore academics.

In Meso-American civilisation, Tlazolteotl, the Aztec goddess of vice, purification, steam baths, lust and filth, and a patroness of adulterers (her name literally means 'Sacred Filth'), had a redemptive role in religious practices. At the end of an individual's life, they were allowed to confess misdeeds to this deity, and she would cleanse the soul by "eating its filth".

The 1911 Encyclopædia Britannica states in its article on sin-eaters:

A symbolic survival of [sin-eating] was witnessed as recently as 1893 at Market Drayton, Shropshire. After a preliminary service had been held over the coffin in the house, a woman poured out a glass of wine for each bearer and handed it to him across the coffin with a 'funeral biscuit.' In Upper Bavaria sin-eating still survives: a corpse cake is placed on the breast of the dead and then eaten by the nearest relative, while in the Balkan peninsula a small bread image of the deceased is made and eaten by the survivors of the family. The Dutch doed-koecks or 'dead-cakes', marked with the initials of the deceased, introduced into America in the 17th century, were long given to the attendants at funerals in old New York. The 'burial-cakes' which are still made in parts of rural England, for example Lincolnshire and Cumberland, are almost certainly a relic of sin-eating.

=== In Wales and the Welsh Marches ===
The term "sin-eater" appears to derive from Welsh culture and is most often associated with Wales and the English counties bordering Wales.

Seventeenth-century diarist John Aubrey, in the earliest source on the practice, wrote that "an old Custome" in Herefordshire had been

at funerals to hire poor people, who were to take upon them all the sins of the party deceased. One of them I remember lived in a Cottage on Rosse-high way. (He was a long, lean, ugly, lamentable Raskel.) The manner was that when the corpse was brought out of the house, and laid on the Bière; a Loaf of bread was brought out, and delivered to the Sine-eater over the corpse, and also a Mazar-bowl of maple (Gossips bowl) full of beer, which he was to drink up, and sixpence in money, in consideration whereof he took upon him (ipso facto) all the Sinnes of the Defunct, and freed him (or her) from walking after they were dead.

John Bagford (c. 1650–1716) includes the following description of the sin-eating ritual in his Letter on Leland's Collectanea, i. 76. (as cited in Brewer's Dictionary of Phrase and Fable, 1898)

Notice was given to an old sire before the door of the house, when some of the family came out and furnished him with a cricket [low stool], on which he sat down facing the door; then they gave him a groat which he put in his pocket, a crust of bread which he ate, and a bowl of ale which he drank off at a draught. After this he got up from the cricket and pronounced the ease and rest of the soul departed, for which he would pawn his own soul.

By 1838, Catherine Sinclair noted the practice was in decline but that it continued in the locality:

A strange popish custom prevailed in Monmouthshire and other Western counties until recently. Many funerals were attended by a professed "sin-eater," hired to take upon him the sins of the deceased. By swallowing bread and beer, with a suitable ceremony before the corpse, he was supposed to free it from every penalty for past offences, appropriating the punishment to himself. Men who undertook so daring an imposture must all have been infidels, willing, apparently, like Esau, to sell their birthright for a mess of pottage.

A local legend in Shropshire, England, concerns the grave of Richard Munslow, who died in 1906, said to be the last sin-eater of the area. Unusually, Munslow was not poor or an outcast, instead being a wealthy farmer from an established family. Munslow may have revived the custom after the deaths of three of his children in a week during 1870 due to scarlet fever. In the words of local Reverend Norman Morris of Ratlinghope, "It was a very odd practice and would not have been approved of by the church but I suspect the vicar often turned a blind eye to the practice." At the funeral of anyone who had died without confessing their sins, a sin-eater would take on the sins of the deceased by eating a loaf of bread and drinking ale out of a wooden bowl passed over the coffin, and make a short speech:

I give easement and rest now to thee, dear man, that ye walk not down the lanes or in our meadows. And for thy peace I pawn my own soul. Amen.

The 1926 book Funeral Customs by Bertram S. Puckle mentions the sin-eater:

Professor Evans of the Presbyterian College, Carmarthen, allegedly saw a sin-eater about the year 1825, who was then living near Llanwenog, Cardiganshire. Abhorred by the superstitious villagers as a thing unclean, the sin-eater cut himself off from all social intercourse with his fellow creatures by reason of the life he had chosen; he lived as a rule in a remote place by himself, and those who chanced to meet him avoided him as they would a leper. This unfortunate was held to be the associate of evil spirits, and given to witchcraft, incantations and unholy practices; only when a death took place did they seek him out, and when his purpose was accomplished they burned the wooden bowl and platter from which he had eaten the food handed across, or placed on the corpse for his consumption.
