= Dead-cakes =

Food traditionally eaten at a wake

The dead cake is a type of food that is traditionally eaten at a wake to honour the deceased individual. It is closely related to the folklore of funeral customs.

The 1911 Encyclopædia Britannica states:

...in the Balkan peninsula a small bread image of the deceased is made and eaten by the survivors of the family. The Dutch doed-koecks or 'dead-cakes', marked with the initials of the deceased, introduced into America in the 17th century, were long given to the attendants at funerals in old New York. The 'burial-cakes' which are still made in parts of rural England, for example Lincolnshire and Cumberland, are almost certainly a relic of sin-eating.

One doed-koeck recipe called for fourteen pounds of flour, six pounds of sugar, five pounds of butter, one quart of water, two teaspoons of pearl ash, two tablespoons of salt, and one ounce of caraway seed. The cakes were then baked into four-inch squares, frosted, and marked with the initials of the departed.

== See also ==
- Funeral biscuit
