= USS Arval =

Patrol vessel of the United States Navy

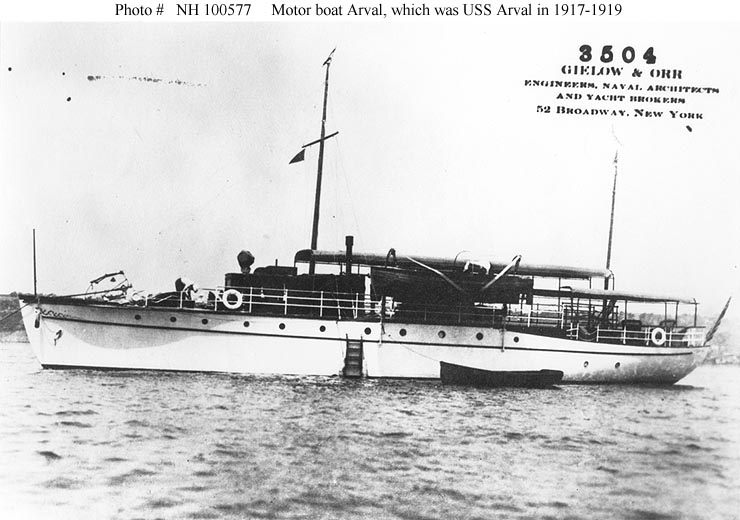
- Arval as a private motorboat sometime between 1911 and 1917.

History

United States
- Name: USS Arval
- Namesake: Previous name retained
- Builder: Stamford Motor Construction Company, Stamford, Connecticut
- Completed: 1911
- Acquired: 1 November 1917
- Commissioned: 1 November 1917
- Decommissioned: 27 February 1919
- Stricken: 27 February 1919
- Fate: Returned to owner 27 February 1919
- Notes: Operated as private motorboat Arval 1911-1917 and from 1919

General characteristics
- Type: Patrol vessel employed as hospital boat
- Tonnage: 49 Gross register tons
- Length: 75 ft (23 m)
- Beam: 14 ft (4.3 m)
- Draft: 10 ft (3.0 m) forward
- Speed: 11 knots
- Complement: 7
- Armament: 2 × 1-pounder guns

USS Arval (SP–1045) was a United States Navy patrol vessel in commission from 1917 to 1919.

Arval was built in 1911 as a private motorboat by the Stamford Motor Construction Company in Stamford, Connecticut. On 1 November 1917, the U.S. Navy acquired her from her owner, Donald N. Test, for use as a section patrol boat during World War I. She was commissioned the same day at Chicago, Illinois, as USS Arval (SP-1045).

Arval departed Chicago on the day of her commissioning and arrived at Charleston, South Carolina, on 7 November 1917. Assigned to the 6th Naval District section patrol and based at Wilmington, North Carolina, Arval patrolled the coastal waters of North Carolina through the end of World War I.

In January 1919, Arval moved north to New York City. She was decommissioned and returned to her owner on 27 February 1919, and stricken from the Navy List the same day.
