= East Slavic =

East Slavic may refer to:

- East Slavic languages, one of three branches of the Slavic languages
- East Slavs, a subgroup of Slavic peoples who speak the East Slavic languages

== See also ==
- Old East Slavic, a language used during the 10th–15th centuries by East Slavs
