= Arvals =

Funeral banquet

The Arval, Arvel or Arthel (Old Norse Arfr, "inheritance", and öl, Old English "Ale", a banquet) is a traditional funeral feast in Scotland, the North of England, and Norse culture. The word also refers, especially in the North of England, to a thin, light, sweet cake, spiced with cinnamon and nutmeg, served to the poor at such feasts. The funeral meal was called the Arvel-dinner. On such occasions, the custom seems to have been to hold an informal inquest, when the corpse was publicly exposed, to exculpate the heir and those entitled to the property of the dead from all accusations of foul play.
