= Trizna =

Slavic funeral rite

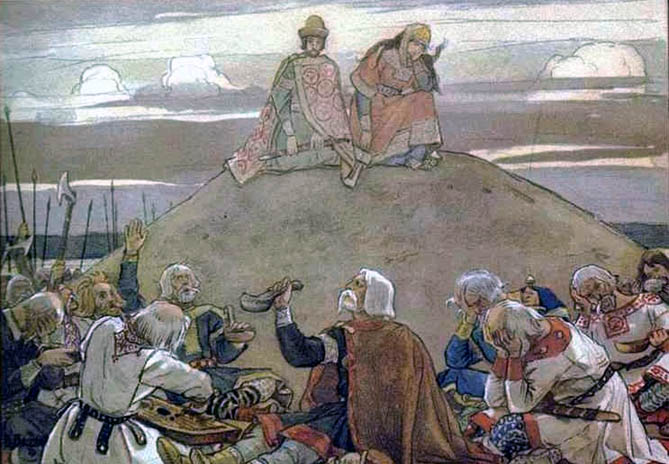
Viktor Vasnetsov. Trizna after Oleg, 1899

Trizna was a funeral feast of ancient Slavic religion, which was conducted for distinguished members of society before their cremation. Besides the feast and the wake, the deceased will have their body washed and dressed in the finest clothes before their cremation, and merry-making and contests were also held. According to tradition, this was done to symbolise the victory of life over death by repelling evil spirits with laughter.

In villages in Bosnia, name trzan or trzna is used for a place in the middle of a village (more rarely near a crossroad) used for gatherings, which is considered to be derived from trizna.
