= Artemiy Artsikhovsky =

Soviet archaeologist (1902–1978)

Novgorod Boardwalk, built ca. 1120, as excavated by Artsikhovsky

Artemiy Vladimirovich Artsikhovsky (Russian: Артемий Владимирович Арциховский) (December 26 (December 13, O.S.), 1902 – February 17, 1978) was a Russian Soviet archaeologist and historian. from 1937 onwards, he was a professor and head of the department of archaeology of the Moscow State University from 1939 onwards.He discovered the birch bark manuscripts in Novgorod, and was a corresponding member of the USSR Academy of Sciences and recipient of the USSR State Prize (1970, 1982 (posthumously)).

== Academic contribution ==
Artsikhovsky developed the methodology and methods of source study analysis, introduced a general course of archeology into the university program.

On July 26, 1951, Artsikhovsky's discovered the first birch-bark writing, which began the study of a new side of the history of local peoples at the Nerevsky excavation site. The fact that in the Middle Ages there were letters on birch bark was known before, but it was believed that they were written in ink and, therefore, it was impossible to count on their safety. Letters found by Artsikhovsky showed that the text was squeezed out and scratched on them. A new unique source on the history of the Middle Ages has appeared.

== Books ==
- Курганы вятичей, М., 1930;
- Древнерусские миниатюры как исторический источник, [М.], 1944
- Введение в археологию, 3 изд., М., 1947
- Основы археологии, 2 изд., М., 1955
- Новые открытия в Новгороде, М., 1955 (in Russian and French)
- Новгородские грамоты на бересте, т. 1–6, М., 1953–63.
