= Funeral biscuit =

Biscuit traditionally served at funerals

Funeral biscuits were a type of biscuit traditionally served at funerals in England, Wales, Scotland, and North America.

The Gentleman's Magazine described funeral biscuits in 1790. The writer described them as "a kind of sugared biscuit, which are wrapped up, generally two of them together, in a sheet of wax paper, sealed with black wax." The biscuits were given to each person attending the funeral, and were a custom of the funerals of "lower and the middling class of people." In Lincolnshire, funeral biscuits were part of the tradition of telling the bees of their owner's death in the early 19th century.

In early North America, the biscuits were stamped with burial motifs or symbols, such as a winged head or cherub, or an hourglass or skull.

Throughout the 19th century, British newspapers carried advertisements for commercially prepared biscuits. Prepared biscuits were common in the period; a story printed in an 1877 edition of the Englishwoman's Domestic Magazine noted,

The world must go round as usual, and folks must eat and drink even when their nearest and best are lying low. The manufacture of funeral biscuits is, we are all aware, quite a flourishing concern.

By the late Victorian period, the phrase "lady fingers" was used in some places interchangeably with funeral biscuits. An 1897 article in the New York Times noted, "The American fashion of serving 'lady fingers' at afternoon tea is said to be a source of some surprise to English people, for the little cakes are generally known in England as 'funeral biscuits,' and are served in rural districts to the mourners after their drive to the cemetery. Similarly, an 1893 article in the New Orleans Daily Picayune noted,

Ladyfingers are served in all parts of England, with light refreshments, at funerals, and usually go by the name of 'funeral biscuits.' In the Yorkshire Dales, if you are asked to a funeral and are unable to attend, they usually send you, with a memorial card, a piece of spongecake and several ladyfingers folded in a sheet of black-bordered paper and fastened with big, black seals.

The tradition of funeral biscuits continued in Wales into the early 20th century:

In some places it is the custom to send to the friends of a family, after a death, a bag of biscuits with the card of the deceased. These funeral biscuits - often small, round sponge cakes - were known as arvel bread - arvel meaning ale. When arvel bread is passed around at a funeral each guest is expected to put a shilling on the plate.

== See also ==
- Dead-cakes
- Ladyfinger
