= Communications in Uganda =

There are a number of systems of communication in Uganda, including a system of telephony, radio and television broadcasts, internet, mail, and several newspapers. The use of phones and the internet in Uganda has rapidly increased in the last few years.

== History ==
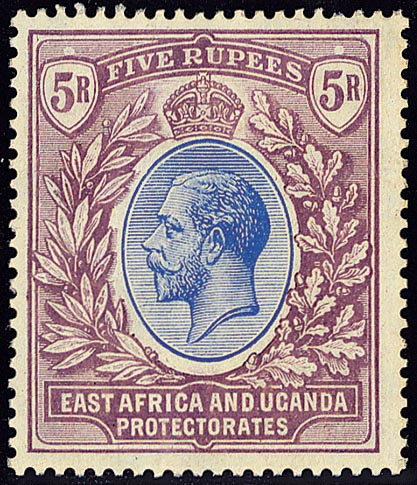
East Africa and Uganda Protectorates 1912 five rupees stamp

=== 1900–1970 ===
The postal service for the protectorates of British East Africa and Uganda was called East Africa and Uganda Protectorates, and operated from 1 April 1903, to 22 July 1920. From 1948 to 1977, postal service in Kenya, Tanzania and Uganda was provided by the East African Posts and Telecommunications Corporation. With the decolonization of Africa, Uganda took over control of its postal system, although until 1961 stamps from the colonial postal system were being issued alongside Uganda's stamps.

=== 1990s–present ===
The Uganda Posts and Telecommunications Corporation had a monopoly over Uganda's communications sector until the Uganda Communications Act was enacted in 1997. The act created the Uganda Communications Commission, the current regulator of communications in Uganda.

== Telephone ==
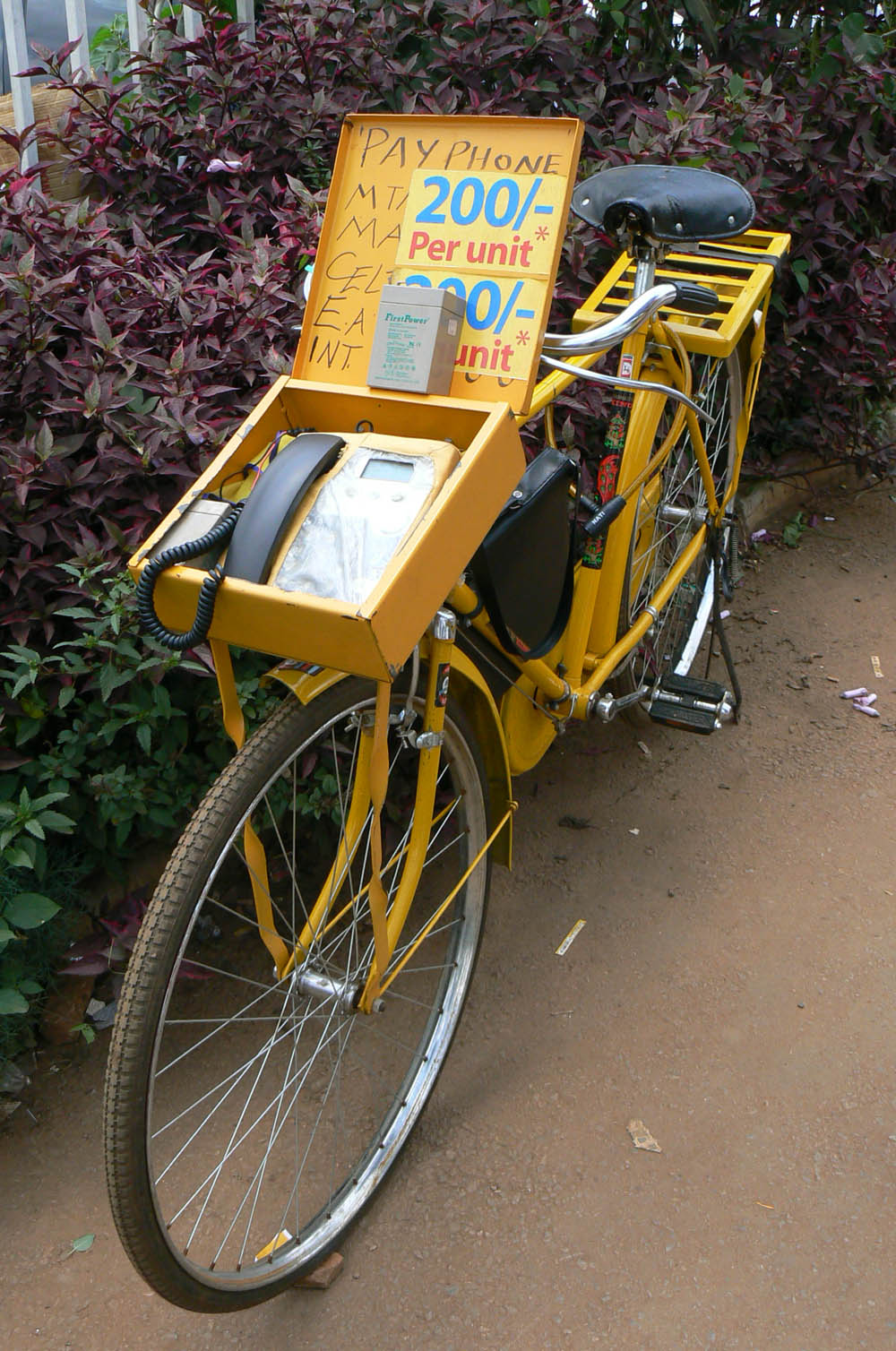
A payphone is mounted on a bicycle in Uganda.

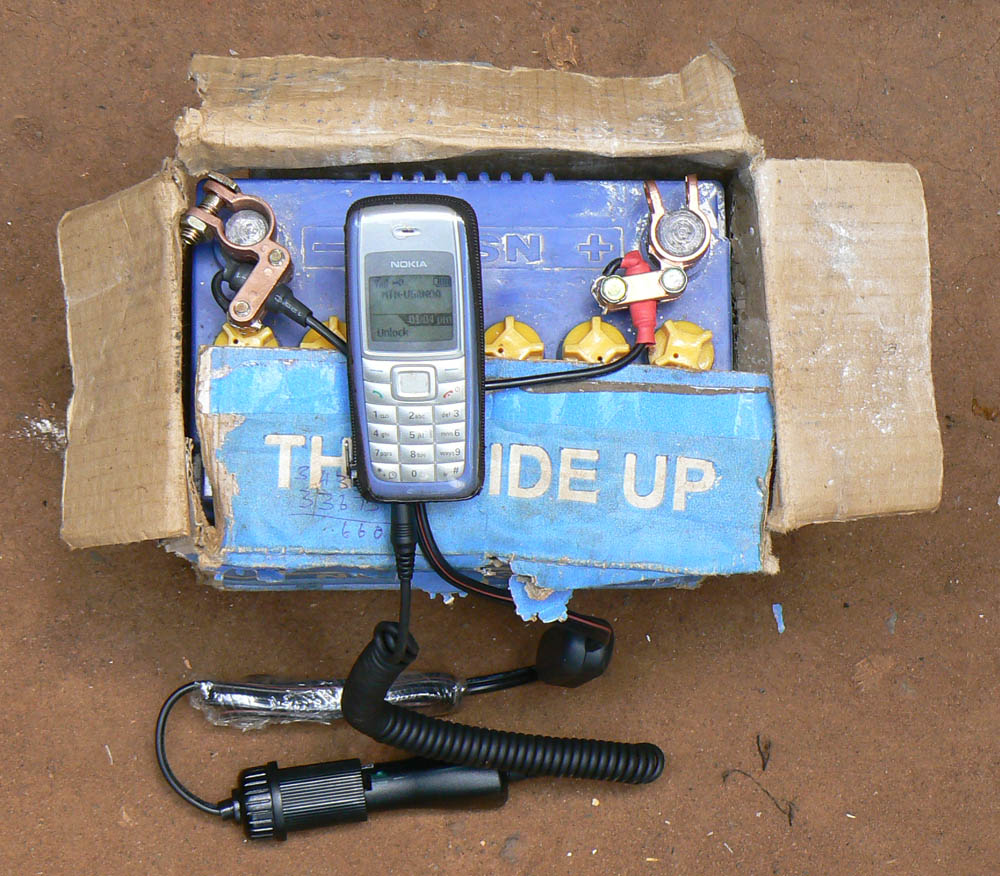
A cell phone being charged from a car battery in Uganda.

As of June 2018, the telephone communications system was described by the CIA factbook as "developed through private partnerships", with "over 1,800 kilometres (1,118 mi) of fiber optics", and 4G network available in most major cities and national parks, and 3G service available in second-tier urban centers. As of 2004, Uganda Telecom Limited (UTL), Celtel and MTN Uganda Limited were the three telecommunications operators licensed by the Uganda Communications Commission.

In 2018 there were 368,243 main telephone lines in use in Uganda, making Uganda 108th in the world. In 2016, there were 23 million mobile telephones in use; 54th in the world. This was an increase from 2006 when there were 108,600 main telephone lines in use in Uganda, and from 2007 when there were 4.195 million mobile telephones in use. By June 2018, the total number of mobile telephone users in Uganda, was 23.6 million, or 57.6% of the 41 million population, according to the Uganda Communications Commission.

As of March 2010 telephone traffic within is carried by wire. Microwave radi relay, and radiotelephone communication stations are used in domestic telecommunications as well, and fixed and mobile cellular systems are used for short range traffic.

As of March 2010 international telephone communication is catered for by an Intelsat and an Inmarsat satellite earth station, along with analog links to Kenya and Tanzania. The international calling code is 256.

== Internet ==
The top-level domain for Uganda is ".ug".

In 2018 Uganda had 18.149 million Internet users, or 45.9% of the population (52nd in the world). This is up from 2.5 million users in 2008 (64th in the world).

In 2012, Uganda had 36,332 fixed broadband subscriptions (119th in the world) or 0.1% of the population (165th in the world) and 2.5 million wireless broadband subscriptions (58th in the world) or 7.6% of the population (99th in the world).

The first high speed commercial internet service in Uganda (and Africa) was constructed by international satellite internet backbone provider NSN Network Services of Avon, CO and its Ugandan ISP client, Infomail Uganda Ltd. This service was switched online on the morning of 5 August 1995.

Infomail was linked by satellite from Kampala to NSN's United States east-coast satellite gateway at the USEI teleport in New Jersey and from there linked by a leased terrestrial connection to NSN's satellite gateway and peering routers which were co-located at the Giga-ring at MAE-WEST, at NASA's jet propulsion laboratory in California.

The actual satellite linking the two continents was leased by NSN from the Russian Space Communications Corporation (RSCC), a C-Band satellite in geostationary orbit over the mid-Atlantic Ocean.

Infomail Uganda began operations with 16 customer dial up lines served by 16 USR 19,200 baud rack mounted modems. A Sun Sparc "Pizzabox" Server on-site in Kampala managed all local internet services and user accounting.

The original satellite link in Kampala used a 5-meter Andrew antenna. The initial link speed was 64 kbit/s, almost immediately upgraded to 1.5 Mbit/s in January 2006 when the RF amplifiers in Kampala were upgraded from 5 Watts to 20 Watts.

Infomail Uganda Ltd was founded and managed by Dr. Jean Paul Minet in partnership with Kampala radio broadcaster Patrick Quarcoo (Capital FM) and William Pike, editor/publisher of The Nation newspaper. The backbone satellite system was designed and assembled / installed in Kampala by NSN's VP of Engineering Bill Sepmeier, NSN co-founder and engineer John Morris, and local Kampala engineer Terah Kagwah.

NSN was sold in 1997 to JACOR/Clear Channel Communications and its remaining network operations in Denver were acquired by LinkUp Communications in 2021.

By the end of 2006 Uganda had 18 Internet service providers. Mobile network operators provide internet services to Ugandans alongside fixed-line internet providers.

MTN was the first mobile operator to offer Internet services in Uganda via GPRS, but Orange (France Telecom) was the first to popularize mobile Internet by offering 3G services after joining the market in 2009. Orange eventually divested from many anglophone markets in Africa, and their Uganda operating company was purchased by Africell Uganda in 2014.

MTN later deployed 3G mobile internet services following decreasing revenues in traditional voice and SMS services. Warid, Zain, UTL, and others later followed suit. Vodafone later entered the market as Uganda's first MVNO.

Fixed-line internet providers have also increased in Uganda. These mainly offer premium dedicated internet services to business customers. Some of the notable ISPs for business include Echotel Uganda formerly iWayAfrica, Roke Telkom, Datanet, Liquid Telecom, Simbanet, Gilat, BCS Uganda, C-Squared Uganda, Seacom UG, among others and this infrastructure is complimented with an exchange point UIXP and a carrier neutral Datacentre Raxio Uganda. These offer high speed internet services for enterprise services with speeds ranging from 0.5 Mbit/s to 10 Gbit/s offering 4G Satellite, LTE, Wimax, Microwave, Fibre connectivity solutions.

In December 2015 Google launched its first wi-fi network in Kampala.

=== Internet censorship and surveillance ===
In September 2009 the OpenNet Initiative found little or no evidence of Internet filtering in all four areas (political, social, conflict/security, and Internet tools) for which it tests.

Though Uganda has made great technological strides in recent years, the country still faces a number of challenges in obtaining affordable, reliable Internet bandwidth. This, rather than a formal government-sponsored filtering regime, is the major obstacle to Internet access. Just prior to the presidential elections in February 2006, the Uganda Communications Commission (UCC) blocked the anti-government Web site RadioKatwe in the only internationally reported case of Internet filtering in Uganda to that date.

During the 2016 parliamentary elections, the government ordered the blocking of social media for 72 hours (18–21 February).

In July 2018 Uganda instituted a tax on "over the top" messaging and voice services, which includes social networks. Users must may a fee of USh 200/= (approx US$0.06) daily to use these services. The stated purpose of the law is to provide additional government revenue, and to control "gossip" being spread over these platforms. VPN services have also been blocked, after they were used by citizens to circumvent the tax. Amnesty International condemned the tax as being "a clear attempt to undermine the right to freedom of expression". Internet usage fell significantly after the tax was introduced.

In January 2021 the government ordered a complete Internet shutdown during the presidential election, that lasted 4 days.

== Postal Service ==
As of 2004, Uganda Post Limited was the only postal service licensed by the Uganda Communications Commission in Uganda. As of 2010, Uganda Post Limited had changed its name to Posta Uganda.

== Radio and television ==
The Uganda Broadcasting Corporation is the public broadcasting station. The 2004 Uganda Broadcasting Corporation Act stated that the UBC should be funded by the levying of a television licence fee. Collection of a licence fee set at 20,000/= (around €8.40 or US$10.80) started in 2005. However, collection was subsequently halted by President Yoweri Museveni. There has since been pressure to reinstate the licence fee to maintain UBC's independence.

== Newspapers ==
Daily newspapers in Uganda include The New Vision, Sunday Vision, The Daily Monitor, The Sunday Monitor, The Red Pepper, The Sunday Pepper, The Uganda Observer, and The East African Business Week in the Northern Region of Uganda. The East African Procurement News is a weekly business newspaper.

== Blogs in Uganda ==
Blogs are increasingly being used as a medium of communication in Uganda. Affordable data rates, increasing internet penetration and free blogging platforms such as Wordpress and Blogger are making internet users turn to blogging platforms to creatively express themselves, comment on current affairs, inform the public among other reasons.

Blog sites in Uganda include Mbu, Techjaja, Nymy Net, Dignited, Mugibson, and Pulse Uganda.

== See also ==
- Uganda Communications Commission
- Media in Uganda
- List of newspapers in Uganda
- List of radio stations in Africa
- Terrestrial fibre optic cable projects in Uganda
