= Timeline of Kampala =

The following is a timeline of the history of the city of Kampala, Buganda, Uganda.

== Prior to 20th century ==
- 1881 - Kasubi Tombs built.
- 1885 - Mengo Palace built.
- 1894
  - Uganda Protectorate established.
  - Anglican church built on Namirembe Hill.
- 1897 - Mengo Hospital founded.

== 20th century ==
- 1901 - Kampala Sports Club formed.
- 1903 - Nsambya Hospital founded.
- 1904 - St. Paul's church built in Mengo.
- 1905 - Government station relocated to Nakasero Hill.
- 1906
  - Kampala designated a township; its area includes Mengo, Nakasero, Namirembe, Nsambya, and Lubaga hills.
  - Population: 30,000.
- 1908 - Uganda Museum founded.
- 1910 - Goan Institute established.
- 1911 - Kampala Club founded.
- 1913 - Indian Association formed.
- 1915 - Port Bell-Kampala railway begins operating.
- 1917 - Kampala Public Library established.
- 1921 - Central Council of Indian Associations of Uganda headquartered in Kampala.
- 1922
  - Technical school established.
  - Population: 40,000 (approximate).
- 1925 - Speke Hotel in business.
- 1929 - Entebbe airfield begins operating.
- 1931 - Uganda Railway begins operating.
- 1948 - Catholic Vicariate of Kampala established.
- 1949
  - Kampala gains "municipal status".
  - Population: 58,000.
- 1950 - WHO Malaria Conference held.
- 1951 - St. Peter's Church Nsambya built.
- 1954 - Uganda Museum moved to its own building.
- 1955 - Butabika Hospital opens.
- 1957 - Lugogo Cricket Oval in use.
- 1958 - Bulange constructed.
- 1959
  - Serwano Kulubya becomes mayor.
  - Population: 46,735 city; 123,332 urban agglomeration.
- 1962 - Kampala becomes capital of Uganda.
- 1963 - City becomes part of republic of Uganda.
- 1964
  - Uganda Public Libraries Board headquartered in city.
  - Nommo Gallery established.
- 1965 - Apollo Hotel in business.
- 1966 - Battle of Mengo Hill.
- 1967
  - East African Development Bank headquartered in Kampala.
  - Ugandan National Theatre established.
- 1968 - Kawempe, Kyambogo, Luzira, Makindye, Mmengo, Nakawa, Nakulabye, Natete, and Ntinda villages become part of Kampala.
  - A. G. Mehta, a Member of Parliament and member of the Uganda People's Congress (UPC), becomes the mayor of Kampala.
- 1969
  - Catholic pope visits city.
  - Mayor A.G. Mehta dies in office on March 10.
  - Population: 330,700 urban agglomeration.
- 1970 - Crested Towers built.
- 1971 - 25 January: Coup.
- 1975
  - July: Organisation of African Unity summit meeting held.
  - Kibuli Hospital founded.
- 1978 - October: Uganda–Tanzania War begins.
- 1979 - 11 April: Fall of Kampala.
- 1980
  - Uganda House built.
  - Population: 458,503.
- 1986
  - City taken by National Resistance Army rebels.
  - Watoto Church founded.
- 1991 - Population: 774,241.
- 1994
  - Monitor newspaper begins publication.
  - 26 June: Shooting at wedding.
  - Sanyu TV begins broadcasting.
- 1996
  - Nasser Sebaggala becomes mayor.
  - International Hospital Kampala founded.
- 1997 - Namboole Stadium opens.
- 1998 - Bugala study center established.
- 1999
  - John Ssebaana Kizito becomes mayor.
  - Communications House built.

== 21st century ==
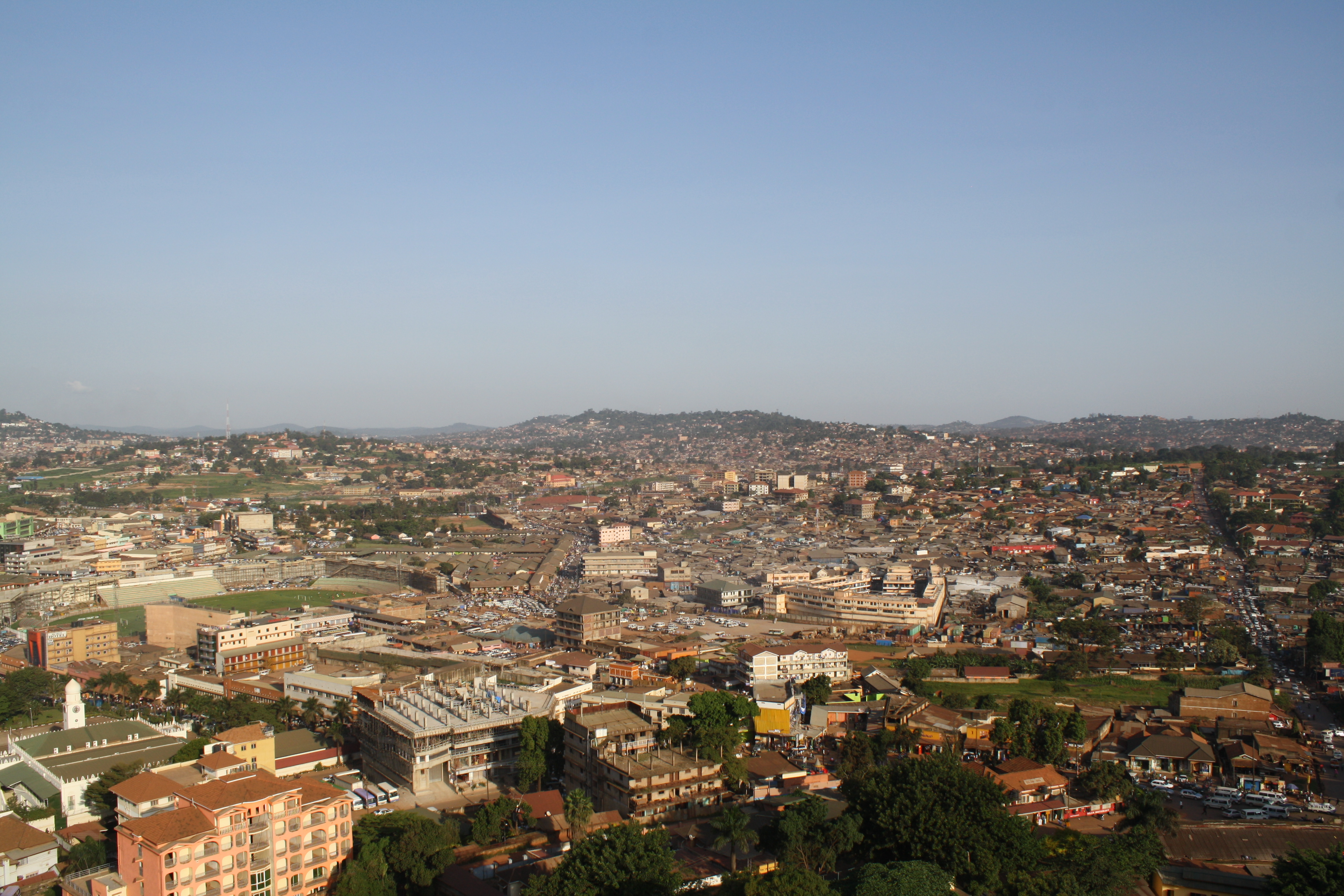
Aerial view of Kampala, 2014

- 2001
  - City limits expanded.
  - Red Pepper newspaper begins publication.
  - Workers' House and Amamu House built.
- 2002
  - Baganda political demonstration.
  - Population: 1,189,142.
- 2004 - The Observer newspaper begins publication.
- 2005
  - East African Business Week begins publication.
  - Uganda Buddhist Centre founded.
  - October: Funeral of Milton Obote.
- 2006
  - Nasser Sebaggala becomes mayor again.
  - Kampala Mosque and skateboarding half-pipe built.
  - Kampala Serena Hotel in business.
- 2007
  - April: Racial unrest.
  - November: Commonwealth Heads of Government Meeting 2007.
  - The Independent news magazine begins publication.
  - Uganda Community Libraries Association headquartered in Kampala.
  - Imperial Royale Hotel in business.
  - Tabu Flo dance troupe formed.
- 2008 - Memonet (media network) formed.
- 2009 - September: Conflict between Buganda partisans and police.
- 2010
  - March: Student unrest.
  - 11 July: Bombings.
  - Rolling Stone newspaper begins publication.
- 2011
  - April: Economic protest.
  - Erias Lukwago becomes mayor.
  - Population: 1,659,000.
- 2012 - Mapeera House (Centenary Bank) built.
- 2013
  - Google office in business.
  - Writivism Literary Festival begins.
  - Air pollution in Kampala reaches annual mean of 104 PM2.5 and 170 PM10, much higher than recommended.
- 2014
  - DFCU Group & DFCU Bank move into their new headquarters at DFCU House.
  - Population: 1,507,114.
- 2021 - Attempted assassination of Katumba Wamala

== See also ==
- Kampala Capital City Authority
- List of mayors of Kampala
- History of Uganda

== Bibliography ==
- David Parkin (1969). Neighbours and Nationals in an African City Ward. Routledge. ISBN 978-1-136-53248-1. (about Kampala)
- Noelle Watson, ed. (1996). "Kampala". International Dictionary of Historic Places: Middle East and Africa. UK: Routledge. ISBN 1884964036.
- Kampala City Development Strategy, UN-HABITAT, 2003
- Paul Tiyambe Zeleza; Dickson Eyoh, eds. (2003). "Kampala, Uganda". Encyclopedia of Twentieth-Century African History. Routledge. ISBN 0415234794.
- David Kiyaga-Mulindwa (2004). "Kampala". In Kevin Shillington (ed.). Encyclopedia of African History. Routledge. pp. 731–2. ISBN 978-1-135-45670-2.
- Creole and Tribal Designs: Dar es Salaam and Kampala as Ethnic Cities in Coalescing Nation States, London: Crisis States Research Centre, 2008 – via International Relations and Security Network
- T. Goodfellow (2010). “’The bastard child of nobody’? Anti-planning and the institutional crisis in Kampala”, Crisis Research Centre.
- S. Lwasa (2010). “Adapting urban areas in Africa to climate change: the case of Kampala”, Current Opinion in Environment and Sustainability, Vol. 2.
- Ari Nave (2010). "Kampala". In Kwame Anthony Appiah and Henry Louis Gates (ed.). Encyclopedia of Africa. Oxford University Press. p. 630. ISBN 978-0-19-533770-9.
- Gordon Prain; et al., eds. (2010). African Urban Harvest: Agriculture in the Cities of Cameroon, Kenya and Uganda. Springer. ISBN 978-1-4419-6249-2. (Includes articles about Kampala)
- T. Goodfellow and K. Titeca. (2012). ‘Presidential intervention and the changing ‘politics of survival’ in Kampala’s informal economy’, Cities, Vol. 29 (4).
- Philip Briggs (2013). "Kampala". Uganda. Bradt Travel Guides. p. 133+. ISBN 978-1-84162-467-9.
- Tom Goodfellow. ‘Urban planning in Africa and the politics of implementation: contrasting patterns of state intervention in Kampala and Kigali’, in: Arlt, V. and Macamo, E. and Obrist, B., (eds.) Living the City. Zurich: Lit Verlag, 2013.
- E.N. Sabiiti; C.B. Katongole (2014). "Urban Agriculture: a Response to the Food Supply Crisis in Kampala City, Uganda". In Basant Maheshwari (ed.). Security of Water, Food, Energy and Liveability of Cities: Challenges and Opportunities for Peri-Urban Futures. Springer. p. 233+. ISBN 978-94-017-8878-6.
