= Kampala Sun =

The Kampala Sun is a Ugandan tabloid newspaper and magazine published in both print and online formats. It mainly focuses on celebrity news and entertainment in Uganda.

== History ==
The Kampala Sun was founded in 1986 and is owned and operated by the Ugandan government and a few partners under the Vision Group that also consists of other companies like New Vision, 94.8 XFM, Bukkedde TV and newspaper plus many more.

The first issue of The Kampala Sun was issued in 1986 and it circulates about 36,500 copies. The company is located at Plot 19/23, Industrial Area, Kampala Uganda.

== See also ==
- NewVision.
- Daily monitor.
- The Independent (Uganda).
