= Joachim Buwembo =

Ugandan journalist, author and columnist

- Born: 1960 (age 65–66); Uganda
- Citizenship: Uganda
- Education: Makerere University (Bachelor of Arts and Diploma in Education); University of Nairobi (Masters in Mass Communications)
- Occupations: Journalist & Columnist
- Years active: 1989–present
- Known for: Publications
- Title: Chairman; Uganda Printing and Publishing Corporation

Joachim Buwembo (born 1960) is a Ugandan author, journalist, and newspaper columnist, who is the chairman of the Uganda Printing and Publishing Corporation (UPPC), the state-owned printing parastatal company, that is mandated to publish and print government documents.

He has previously worked as the managing editor of the Daily Monitor newspaper, an English language daily, owned by the Nation Media Group, headquartered in Nairobi, Kenya.

== Early life ==
Buwembo was born in the Buganda Region of Uganda, circa 1960. After attending local primary school, he was admitted to St. Mary's College Kisubi, where he completed his secondary education. He then entered Makerere University, Uganda's oldest and largest public university, where he graduated with a Bachelor of Arts degree and a concurrent Diploma in Education. Later, he obtained a Masters in Mass Communications from the University of Nairobi.

== Career ==
His journalistic career began in 1989 when he joined the Weekly Topic, as a reporter-trainee. In 1992, the editors of Weekly Topic broke away and created the Daily Monitor. After his postgraduate studies in Kenya, he rose through the ranks to become the Deputy Editor of the Weekly Topic. He also for a period, served as the Kampala Bureau Chief of The EastAfrican, a weekly publication, also owned by the National Media Group.

He also worked at the New Vision Group and was responsible for the Sunday Vision, from 1997 until 2004. He is credited with increasing circulation from 17,000 copies to 45,000 copies in a space of two years. When, in 2005, Nation Media Group launched The Citizen (Tanzania), the group turned to Buwembo to be part of those efforts. He briefly returned to Uganda as managing editor of the Daily Monitor. He was then asked by the Washington-based International Center for Journalists to return to Tanzania and promote developmental journalism through the Knight International Fellowship, from 2009 to 2011.

He was then employed by the UNDP at their Africa Climate Change Adaptation Programme, as the head of the editorial training team, based in Nairobi, from 2012 to 2013. He is an editor at Uganda Radio Network, Uganda's largest news agency. In addition to his other responsibilities he continues to train and mentor in-service journalists nationally.

== Personal ==
He is reported to have the ability to communicate in two African languages; Luganda and Kiswahili and in two European languages; English and French.

== See also ==
- Charles Onyango-Obbo
