= List of newspapers in Uganda =

This is a list of newspapers in Uganda.

== List of newspapers ==
Newspaper	Location	First issued	Publisher	Languages	Website	Notes
Scribe Uganda	Kampala	2016	Bookablehood Ltd	English	Website	Online Daily Newspaper
Uganda Argus	Kampala	1955	Ugandan Argus Limited	English		Ceased publication in 1971
New Vision	Kampala	1986	New Vision Group	English	Website	
Bukedde	Kampala	1994	New Vision Group	Luganda	Website	
Daily Monitor	Kampala	1994	Nation Media Group	English	Website	
Red Pepper	Namanve	2001	Pepper Publications	English	Website	
The Observer (Uganda)	Kampala	2004	Observer Media Limited	English	Website	
The Daily Nile	Hoima City	2025	Abjine Capital Group Limited (sold)	English	Website	
East African Business Week	Kampala	2005	East African Business Week Limited	English	Website	
The Independent (Uganda)	Kampala	2007		English	Website	
Rolling Stone (Uganda)	Kampala	2010				Ceased publication November 2010
The Ghetto Post	Hoima City	2025	Abjine Capital Group Limited	English	Website	
The Nation	Hoima City	2026	Abjine Capital Group Limited	English	Website	
The Rwenzori Times	Kasese	2015	Rwenzori Media Group	English	Website	
The Fast Observer	Kampala	2020	Alfa Media Smc ltd	English	Website	
Nile Chronicles	Kampala	2012	Nile Chronicles	English	Website	
The Ankole Times	Mbarara	2020	NS Media House	English	Website	
The Northern Press	Gulu	2021	Oyet Broadcasting Services	English	Website	
Mengo Notes (later Named Uganda Notes)	Kampala	1900	CMS Industrial Mission	English		Ceased publication November 1961
Ebifa mu Buganda	Kampala	1907	Church Missionary Society	Luganda		
Munno	Kampala	1911	Munno Publications	Luganda		Suspended publication in 1976 and resumed in 1979 Ceased publication in 1989
The Uganda Herald	Kampala	1912	The Uganda Printing& Publishing Company Limited	English		Ceased publication in 1955
Voice of Uganda	Kampala	1972		English		Ceased publication in 1979
The Weekly Topic	Kampala	1978		English		Ceased publication in 1994
The Uganda Times	Kampala	1979		English		Ceased publication in 1984
Orumuri	Kampala	1963		Runyankore-Rukiga		Ceased publication in 1997
Uganda Confidential	Kampala	1992	Uganda Confidential Information Services	English		Ceased publication in 1998
Equator(News Paper)	Kampala	1979		English		Ceased publication in 1986
Entatsi	Kampala	1999	Entatsi Publications	Luganda		
Emambya Esaze	Kampala	1960		Luganda		Ceased publication in 1990
Crusader(News Paper	Kampala	1996		English		Ceased publication in 1998
Dobozi lya Buganda	Kampala	1950		Luganda		Ceased publication in 1958
Lipoota	Kampala	1994	Lipoota Publications	Luganda		Ceased publication in 1998
New Times (News Paper)	Kampala	1996		English		
Njuba Times	Kampala	1997		English		
Uganda Post	Kampala	1955		English		Ceased publication in 1983
Uganda Nation	Kampala	1962		English		Ceased publication in 1963
Uganda Empya	Kampala	1953		Luganda		Ceased publication in 1961
The Kampala Sun	Kampala		Vision Group	English	Website	Ceased publication in 2020
Etop	Kampala	1990	Vision Group	Ateso		Ceased publication in 2020
Uganda Eyogera	Kampala	1953	Embuulire Publications	Luganda		Ceased publication in 1993
Rupiny	Kampala	1993	Vision Group	Luo		Ceased publication in 2020
Oyeng-Yeng	Kampala	1995		Luo		
Sekanyolya	Kampala	1920		Luganda		Ceased publication in 1985
The People (News Paper)	Kampala	1994		English		
Ngabo (News Paper)	Kampala	1980	Shield Publications	English		Ceased publication in 1996
The Word (News Papers)	Kampala	1997		English		
Lobo Mewa	Kampala	1958	Verona Fathers of Gulu	Luo		Ceased publication in 1971
Shariat (News Paper)	Kampala	1986		English		
Sunrise (News Paper)	Kampala	2000		English		
The Message (News Paper)	Kampala	2000		English		
Erwom K'teso	Uganda	1957	Tororo Diocese	Luganda		Ceased publication in 1960
Focus (News Paper)	Uganda	1987				Ceased publication in 1988
Financial Times (Uganda)	Uganda	1985		English		Ceased publication in 1993
Freedom Ddembe	Uganda	1961				
Gambuuze	Uganda	1933				Ceased publication in 1956
The Guide (News papers)	Uganda	1987		English		Ceased publication in 1990
Imuka	Uganda	1959		Luganda		Ceased publication in 1963
Kampala Guardian	Kampala	1980		English		
Kamunye	Uganda	2006	Pepper Publications	Luganda		
Kodheyo	Uganda	1997	Kodheyo Publications Ltd	Lusoga		Ceased publication in 1998
Look (News Paper)	Uganda	1996		English		
Lumuli (News Paper)	Uganda	1959		Luganda		Ceased publication in 1963
Madhvani (News Paper)	Uganda	1966		English		Ceased publication in 1970
Makererean	Uganda	1961	Makerere University Students Guild	English		Ceased publication in 1969
Matalisi	Uganda	1925		Luganda		Ceased publication in 1954
Mawulire	Uganda	1959		Luganda		Ceased publication in 1962
Munnansi	Uganda	1981	Africa Development Network	Luganda, English & Acholi		Ceased publication in 1986
Mwebembezi	Uganda	1965				Ceased publication in 1974
Mwebinga	Uganda	1964		Runyoro, Rutooro		
Rwenzori Daily	Uganda	2020	Rwenzori Daily Uganda Limited	English	Website	
Weekly Topic	Uganda	1979	Topic Publications	English		Ceased publication in 1994

== See also ==
- Media in Uganda
- List of newspapers in Africa
- Communications in Uganda

== Bibliography ==
- John C.G. Isobal (1980). "Rise and Fall of Uganda's Newspaper Industry, 1900–1976". Journalism Quarterly. 57 (2): 224–233. doi:10.1177/107769908005700204. S2CID 145011870.
- "Uganda: Directory: the Press". Africa South of the Sahara 2004. Regional Surveys of the World. Europa Publications. 2004. p. 1190. ISBN 1857431839.
- "Uganda", Freedom of the Press, USA: Freedom House, 2016
