= Etop =

- Founder(s): Vision Group
- Publisher: Vision Group
- Founded: 1990
- Language: Ateso
- Ceased publication: 2020
- Country: Uganda

Etop was a local newspaper in Uganda that was published weekly in Ateso, one of the local languages in Eastern Uganda.

== Background ==
Etop was established in 1990 by Vision Group to serve the Teso people in Teso, Tororo, parts of Karamoja and Western Kenya. Etop, like other local language newspapers such as Bukedde, Orumuri and Rupiny were established to mobilize, educate, and preserve the indigenous language. Further still, this newspaper played a key role in promoting cultural values, norms and also facilitating unity and reconciliation amongst the Teso people hence bringing about transformation of the region.

The paper was used as a mode of instruction in schools through its pullout dubbed 'Pass PLE.' (PLE stands for Primary Leaving Examinations. This is a set of national examinations are sat at the end of primary school in Uganda) Etop was also used a channel to sensitize the community on profitable agricultural practices and to promote health communities especially during the Ebola outbreak.

However, in 2020, Etop was among the local language newspapers that were closed by Vision Group due to financial constraints and the impact of the COVID-19 pandemic. At the time of its closure, Etop was two months away from celebrating its 30th anniversary.

Former Etop newspaper reporters and editors based in the eastern district of Soroti started their own weekly publication in Ateso called Aicerit, which means star. This is intended to keep the language alive as it champions development in the region.

== See also ==
List of newspapers in Uganda
