= Barbara Kaija =

Ugandan journalist and educator (born 1964)

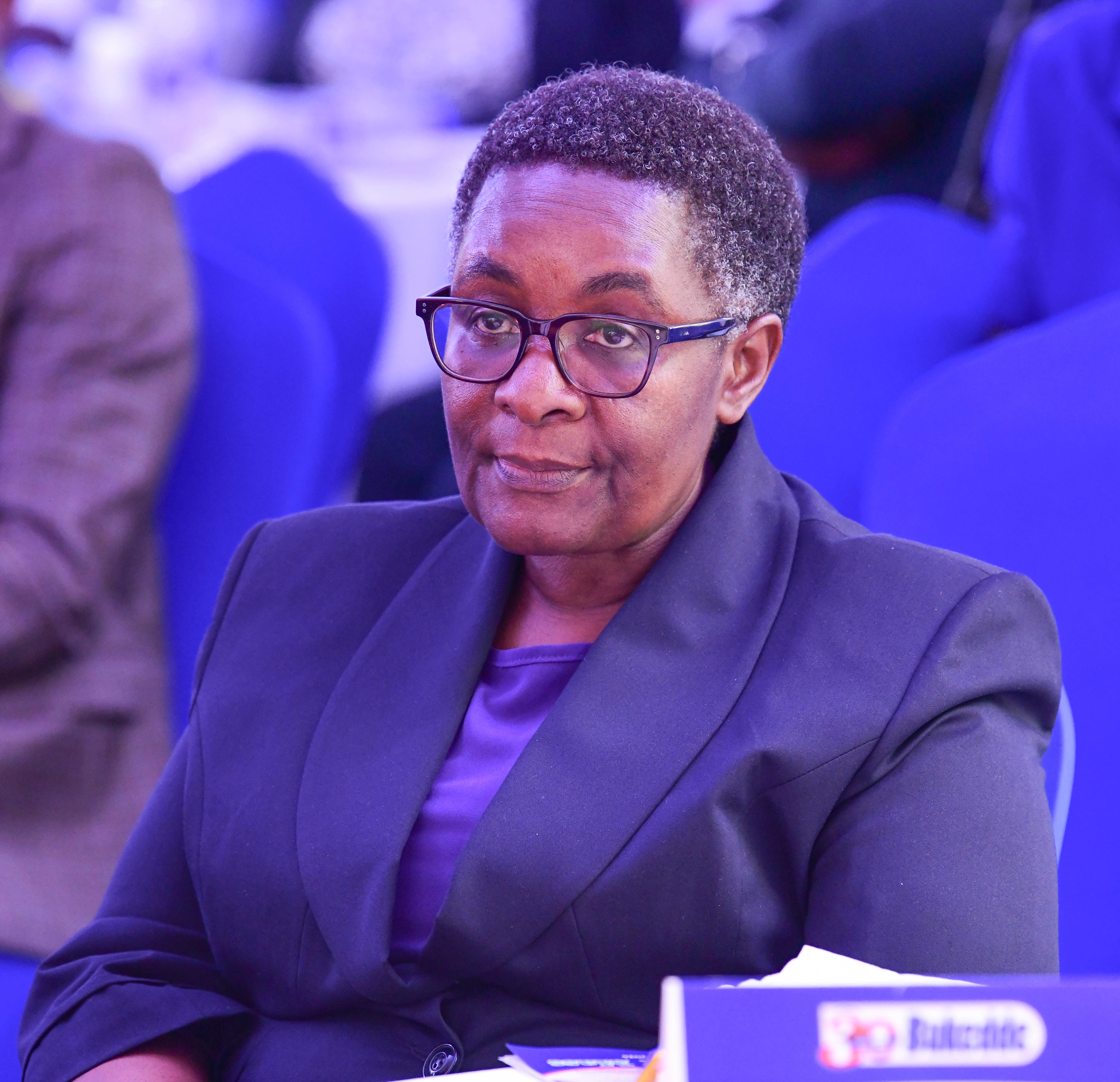
- Barbara Kaija
- Born: 1964 (age 61–62); Uganda
- Citizenship: Uganda
- Education: Makerere University (Bachelor of Arts in Education) (Master of Arts in Education); Rhodes University (Master of Arts in Journalism); Thomson Foundation (Postgraduate Diploma in Practical Journalism)
- Occupations: Journalist and teacher
- Years active: 1992–present
- Title: Group editor-in-chief of the New Vision Group
- Awards: 2018 Africa Laureate by the World Association of Newspapers and News Publishers WAN-IFRA, National Jubilee Award, Uganda Government

Barbara Kaija (born 1964) is a Ugandan journalist and educator. She served as the editor in chief, and head of content generation at the Vision Group, a largely government owned media house，from 2010 until her retirement in June 2026.

== Background and education ==
Kaija was educated at Makerere University, Uganda's oldest public university, first graduating with a Bachelor of Arts degree in education. She followed that with a Master of Arts degree in education, also at Makerere. Later, she obtained a Master of Arts in journalism and media studies, from Rhodes University, in Grahamstown, Eastern Cape, South Africa. She also has a Postgraduate Diploma in Practical Journalism, obtained in Cardiff, Wales in the United Kingdom, under the sponsorship of the Thomson Foundation.

== Career ==
Her tenure at Vision Group spans over 30 years. In 1992, she was hired as a sub-editor trainee. Over time, she was given more responsibilities and rose to the position of deputy features editor. Later she became the features editor, and worked in that capacity for ten years. She was appointed deputy editor-in-chief in 2006 and she became editor-in-chief in 2010. In her current capacity, she oversees journalistic standards and strategy of all media platforms (print, radio, television, internet and social media) of the Vision Group. When she assumed the role of editor-in-chief in 2010, she became the first Ugandan woman to become a chief editor of a Ugandan major newspaper.

== Personal life ==
Kaija is married.

She is a born-again Christian and her religious beliefs strongly guide her life.

== Other considerations ==
Kaija has a passion for journalism and commitment to teaching others. She has specialized in "development journalism", in which she has taught and supervised many Ugandan journalists.

In 2012, she was awarded the National Jubilee Award, in recognition of her body of work. In March 2011, the Ugandan newspaper Daily Monitor, part of the Aga Khan-owned Nation Media Group, named her one of "Today's Uganda Top Fifty Women Movers".
