= Arinaitwe =

Arinaitwe is a surname. Notable people with the surname include:

- Arinaitwe Rugyendo, Ugandan author
- Davis Arinaitwe (born 1987), Ugandan cricketer
- Rachael Mwine Arinaitwe (born 1983), Ugandan journalist
- Zephania Arinaitwe (born 2001), Ugandan cricketer
