= Blizz Uganda =

Entertainment news website

- Website type: Entertainment news website
- Available in: English
- Headquarters: Kampala, Uganda.
- Parent: Blizz Entertainment Limited
- Website: www.blizz.co.ug
- Commercial: Yes
- Launched: 2015; 11 years ago
- Current status: Active

Blizz Uganda is a Ugandan news website founded in 2015. Owned by "Blizz Entertainment Limited", the website provides entertainment, national and sports news mainly from Uganda and the East African Community.

== History ==
Blizz Uganda was launched in 2015 and is headquartered in Kampala, Uganda the capital and largest city in the country.

Blizz Uganda launched as an Entertainment Website but later increased the scope to cover National, Sports, Business and Political News.

The company was incorporated in 2016 as Blizz Entertainment Limited.

In 2017, the company changed the domain from ugblizz.com to blizz.co.ug and in that year received Accreditation from Uganda Communications Commission (UCC) the regulator of digital communications licensed as an online news publisher.

In 2021, Blizz Uganda launched a Business news website with a directory and job portal The Pearl Post.

== Overview ==
Blizz Uganda is a registered media company licensed as an online website.

The website covers fields of Entertainment, Politics, and Sports news, in addition to music streaming and downloading. The website mostly covers local news from Uganda.

== Reception ==
Blizz Uganda upon its launch became one of the most visited websites in the country. In 2021, May, it was listed as Number 10 in the list of most visited websites in the country.

The website says that they receive over 1,700,000 pages every month which makes them one of the most visited websites in the 3rd largest economy in the East African community.

== See also ==
- List of newspapers in Uganda
- Media in Uganda
