= Charles Onyango-Obbo =

Ugandan journalist, author and columnist

- Born: 1958 (age 67–68); Mbale, Uganda
- Citizenship: Uganda
- Education: Makerere University (Bachelor of Arts in Journalism); American University in Cairo (Master of Arts in Journalism); Harvard University (Fellowship in Journalism)
- Occupations: Journalist & Community Activist
- Years active: 1991–present
- Known for: Publications
- Title: Editor; Mail & Guardian Africa

Charles "Mase" Onyango-Obbo, also Charles Onyango Obbo, (born 1958) is a Ugandan author, journalist, and former Editor of Mail & Guardian Africa. He is a former Managing Editor of The Monitor, a daily Ugandan newspaper, former Executive Editor for the Africa and Digital Media Division with Nation Media Group. Considered one of the finest journalists in Africa, Onyango-Obbo is a political commentator on issues in East Africa and the African Great Lakes region. He writes a column, "Ear to the Ground", in The Monitor, a second column in the regional weekly The EastAfrican, and a third in the Daily Nation.

== Early life ==
Onyango-Obbo was born in the town of Mbale in Eastern Uganda. He studied at St. Leo’s College, Kyegobe in Fort Portal and later Makerere University in Kampala, the largest and oldest public university in Uganda, graduating with a degree of Bachelor of Arts in Journalism. He later attended the American University in Cairo, obtaining a degree of Master of Arts in journalism. In 1991, he was a Nieman Fellow at Harvard University.

== Career ==
In late 1997, he and Andrew Mwenda, now managing director and editor-in-chief of The Ugandan Independent news magazine, then a reporter with the Daily Monitor, were arrested and charged with "publication of false news". Their arrest followed a story in which the paper quoted reports in The Indian Ocean newsletter, that Uganda had become compensated with gold by the Kinshasa government of Laurent Kabila, for its support, along with Rwanda, in helping to oust the regime of long-term Zaire (now the Democratic Republic of the Congo) dictator Mobutu Sese Seko. They fought the case through the High Court, where their appeal was rejected; went to the Constitutional Court, where again their appeal was rejected; and eventually in 2003 won the most significant court victory for Uganda when the Uganda Supreme Court, against the state, ruled the offense of "publication of false news" to be unconstitutional.

In May 1999, during the Second Congo War, Onyango-Obbo and other editors of The Monitor – Wafula Ogutu and David Ouma Balikowa – were arrested and charged with "sedition" and "publication of false news", following the publication of a photograph of a naked woman being sexually abused by men in military uniform. Ugandan officials insisted that the assailants might be soldiers from Congo or Zimbabwe (who were also involved in the Congo war), and could not possibly be Ugandan soldiers as the photo caption claimed. Onyango-Obbo and the other editors were acquitted on 6 March 2001.

In October 2002, again Onyango-Obbo and three other colleagues were arrested and charged with publication of a story that "aided the enemies of Uganda", after a report that alleged that a military helicopter might have been shot down in northern Uganda by the obnoxious rebels of the Lord's Resistance Army. The government also closed down The Monitor for 10 days. They were acquitted of the charges a year later. In all, Onyango-Obbo appeared in court over 120 times between 1997 and mid-2003; more than the combined number of times Ugandan journalists had been in court since the country's independence in October 1962.

== Leaving Uganda ==
With that, Onyango-Obbo took up an offer from Nation Media Group, which had taken a majority stake in The Monitor in March 2000, to move to Nairobi, Kenya, and initiate the group's media convergence operations. In his view, his continued presence had become counter-productive, because of the hostility of the government towards him and the extent to which he had become a controversial figure, and was overshadowing the newspaper's long-term prospects and undermining the ability of other journalists at the paper to emerge.

In 2014, Onyango-Obbo left Nation Media Group to run Mail and Guardian Africa, a digital news platform owned by South Africa's Mail & Guardian, as its Africa Editor. He left the Nairobi-based unit two years later, launching his own digital media unit which currently runs Africa Explainer, AfricaPedia, and Rogue Chiefs.

== See also ==
- Joachim Buwembo

== Publications ==
- Ear to the Ground (1996):
- Uganda's Poorly Kept Secrets: (1998) – A Collection of short stories
- Mixed and Brewed in Uganda: (2008) – A Short tour of the soul of a nation and its people
- It Never Happened: (2009) – A story on the day before Uganda military dictator Idi Amin was ousted in 1979, the day he fell, and the day after.
