= Kamunye =

Ugandan local newspaper

- Type: Weekly newspaper
- Format: Print and Digital
- Publisher: Uwesa Media
- Founded: 2006
- Country: Uganda
- Sister newspapers: Red Pepper
- Website: https://www.kamunye.com/

Kamunye is a local independent newspaper in Uganda that was first issued in 2006. It publishes both local and regional news.

== History ==
It is a sister paper to Red Pepper, a tabloid in Uganda, and it has 74 bound volumes.

This paper has been closed on two occasions, with the first one happening during the Buganda riots in 2009. In this case, the scene of crime law was massively applied and this led to the closure Daily Monitor and its sister radio stations, KFM and Dembe FM, plus Red Pepper and sister publications Hello and Kamunye.

In 2017, Red Pepper was closed down in November alongside Kamunye. Their directors and editors were jailed after publishing a story alleging that Yoweri Museveni was training Rwandan rebels to topple the government of Paul Kagame. The president of Uganda later on gave a directive for them to be reopened after 3 months following a meeting with them at state house in Uganda.
