= Emambya Esaze =

Ugandan newspaper

- Type: Weekly newspaper
- Founder(s): Buganda Clan Leaders (Abataka)
- Publisher: Paulo Muwanga
- Editor: Paulo Muwanga, Damulira Mukiibi
- Founded: 1949
- Political alignment: Nationalist, Pro-Independence
- Ceased publication: 1990
- Country: Uganda

Emambya Esaze was a Ugandan newspaper published in the Luganda language, established by Paulo Muwanga during the 1940s and which ended its run in 1990 following its founder's death. The paper played a key role in promoting political change, national independence, and grassroots mobilization efforts in Buganda and throughout Uganda.

== History ==
The name Emambya Esaze translates to "the dawn has come" in Luganda. The newspaper founded in 1949 as a publication affiliated with Buganda traditional clan leaders (Abataka), who used it as a platform for political reform against colonial rule. It aimed to challenge colonial-aligned chiefs and advocate for increased local representation. By April 1949, the newspaper became a key voice for the Baganda people's rights, especially regarding land and governance. This early incarnation of Emambya Esaze was very much a political tool: it targeted the establishment and advocated for the rights of ordinary Baganda (referred to as "Abazzukulu" or “grandchildren”) during the turbulent late colonial period.

During the 1950s, Emambya Esaze transformed into a radical nationalist newspaper. It was run out of Katwe, Kampala, by Paulo (Paul) Muwanga, a well-known activist for Ugandan independence, who owned and edited it. The paper was recognized for its opposition to colonialism and backing of the Uganda National Congress (UNC) youth movement. It played a significant role in mobilizing resistance against the British rule through the promotion of Pan-Africanism and the advocacy of direct action against colonial authorities.

== Impact on Ugandan media and society ==
Emambya Esaze was among the earliest indigenous-language newspapers together with Uganda Empya, Obuggaga bwa Uganda, Muwereza that identified with the struggle for Uganda's independence. It published articles that were critical of colonial policies and promoted nationalist sentiments. The frequent clashes with colonial authorities were a result of the paper's strong editorial stance. By the late 1950s, the British administration had prohibited Emambya Esaze and other critical newspapers like Uganda Post and Gambuze, accusing them of sedition. Many of its editors, including Muwanga, were arrested and prosecuted under colonial press laws. Despite the crackdown, Emambya Esaze resumed publication in the 1960s and remained a significant newspaper in Uganda for three more decades. It continued to serve the Buganda region, covering political developments, cultural issues, and governance matters.

== Closure in 1990 ==
The newspaper ceased publication in 1990. When President Yoweri Museveni set up the National Resistance Movement (NRM) as the political force in 1986 he initiated a major modification of media structures throughout Uganda. Older newspapers such as Emambya Esaze found it difficult to transform themselves into the new political structure. The newspaper industry of the late 1980s and early 1990s witnessed the establishment of Bukedde which introduced a modernized business-oriented method of reporting in Luganda language. Since his death from declining health in 1991 Paulo Muwanga spent many years leading Emambya Esaze as its editor and publisher.

== Archives and surviving records ==
Physical copies of Emambya Esaze from 1960 to 1990 are preserved in the Makerere University Library's Africana section and the National Library of Uganda.

== See also ==
- List of newspapers in Uganda
- Paulo Muwanga
