= Robert Kabushenga =

Ugandan lawyer and business executive

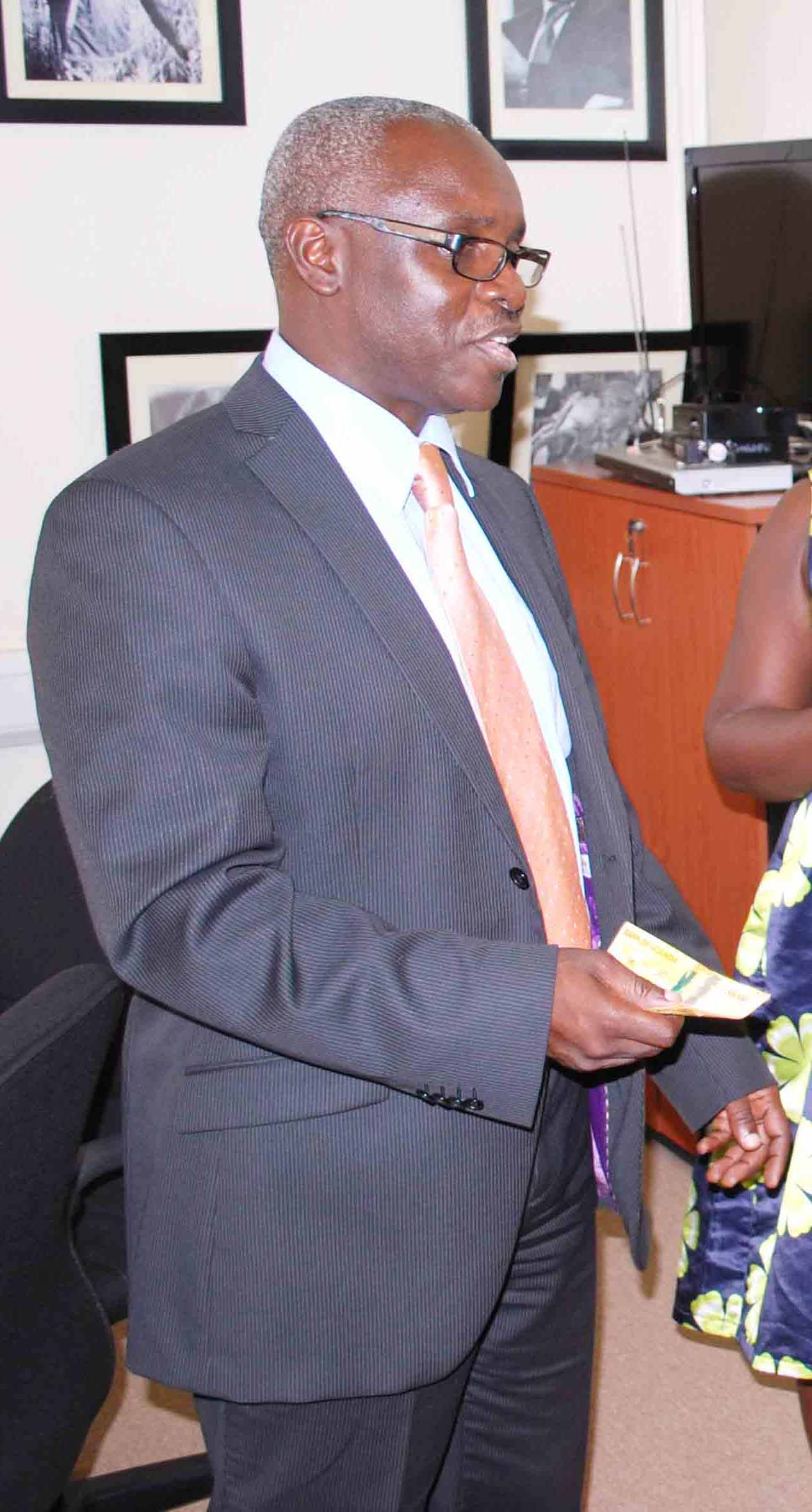
- Robert Kabushenga
- Born: c. 1971 (age 54–55); Uganda
- Education: Makerere University (Bachelor of Laws); Law Development Centre (Postgraduate Diploma in Legal Practice)
- Occupations: Lawyer and corporate executive
- Years active: Since 1995
- Title: Former chief executive officer of New Vision Group and incumbent board member KCB Bank Uganda Limited

Robert Kabushenga is a Ugandan lawyer and corporate executive. He served as the managing director and chief executive officer of the Vision Group (New Vision Printing and Publishing Company Limited) from January 2007 to January 2021. He has been a non-executive board member of KCB Bank Uganda Limited, since November 2021.

== Early life and education ==
Kabushenga was born to Geoffrey Sabiti Kabushenga in Uganda in 1971. He was raised by a single mother in Kampala, Uganda's capital city, in the 1970s and 1980s.

He holds a Bachelor of Laws degree awarded by Makerere University, Uganda's oldest and largest public university. He also holds a Postgraduate Diploma in Legal Practice, awarded by the Law Development Centre, in Kampala. In addition, he attended the American Academy of International Law, in Dallas, Texas, United States.

== Career ==
=== Early Career ===
Kabushenga worked as a legal and Administrative officer at the Monitor Publications Limited (Publishers of Daily Monitor). He later served as board secretary, company secretary, and legal officer at the Vision Group from 2002 to 2005. He was appointed executive director of the Uganda Media Centre and concurrently served as the government of Uganda's spokesperson.

=== Vision Group (2007-2021) ===
On 1 January 2007, Kabushenga was appointed managing director and chief executive officer of the Vision Group, succeeding expatriate journalist William Pike. During his 14-year tenure, the group expanded its portfolio by launching additional radio stations, television channels (including Bukedde TV), magazines, and digital platforms while transitioning toward greater commercial competitiveness as a listed company on the Uganda Securities Exchange. In January 2021, he announced his resignation, citing personal reasons and requesting early retirement. He oversaw a 90-day transition period before departing. However, some contemporary reports described internal disagreements or board-level decisions around the time of his exit.

He was succeeded by Don Wanyama, who had previously served as the senior presidential press secretary. The Ugandan government is a major shareholder in this media house, whose shares of stock are listed on the Uganda Securities Exchange.

In 2024, after president Museveni sacking Dorothy Kisaka as KCCA executive director, Kabushenga was among the people that expressed interest in the job.

== Other roles ==
Kabushenga is an advocate of the High Court of Uganda and a member of the Uganda Law Society. He is a fellow of the Africa Leadership Initiative and a member of the Aspen Global Leadership Network. In November 2021, he was appointed a non-executive director of KCB Bank Uganda Limited.
