= Sheila Tusiime =

- Born: Uganda
- Occupations: Journalist, News Anchor, Entrepreneur, Communication Expert
- Employer: NBS Television
- Known for: News broadcasting, storytelling, media presentation

Sheila Tusiime is a Ugandan Journalist, news anchor, entrepreneur and a communication expert.

== Early life and inspiration ==
Sheila developed an interest in television and journalism at a young age. She cited Ugandan media personalities such as J Kazoora, Francis Baale, and Straka as people who influenced and inspired her interest in media broadcasting and storytelling. She was greatly inspired by their on-screen professionalism and presentation style, helping her shape her career.

== Education and career ==
She works as a news anchor at NBS Television, where she presents news bulletins and participates in newsroom reporting. She has been associated with the station for several years and is part of its news broadcasting team. Her work focuses on general news and current affairs. She emphasises professional development and adaptability in response to changes in the media industry.

== See also ==
- NBS Television
- Media in Uganda
