= Judith Bakirya =

Permaculture farmer from Uganda

- Born: Bugosa District, Uganda
- Education: Mt St Mary's College Namagunga
- Alma mater: University of Birmingham
- Occupation: Permaculture farmer
- Known for: Founder of Busaino Fruits & Trees
- Notable work: Agro-heritage farming and agro-tourism in Uganda
- Awards: BBC 100 Women (2019)

Judith Bakirya is a Ugandan permaculture farmer. She was named one of the BBC's 100 Women for 2019.

== Early life and education ==
Bakirya was born in the Busoga Region of Uganda, and raised on a farm, though she did not initially intend to be a farmer. As a child, in addition to working on her family's farm, Bakirya and her sisters attended school. At her primary school she qualified for a scholarship to the prestigious secondary school, Mt St Mary's College Namagunga. She later qualified for a government scholarship to attend university, and earned a Masters in health and development from Birmingham University in the UK.

== Career ==
In 2000, Bakirya quit her job at an NGO in order to return to farming. Using her savings and a small loan from the village Savings and Loans Association, she founded Busaino Fruits & Trees. In 2014, she won the Best Farmers competition sponsored by Vision Group, the Netherlands Embassy in Uganda, KLM Airlines and DFCU Bank. The prize included a chance to exhibit at the Source of the Nile Agriculture Show and to attend agricultural exhibitions in the Netherlands. After this, she opened her own exhibition centre for traditional medicine and culture in Uganda's Jinja District. In 2017, she began the National Agro-Tourism Institute in Jinja to further promote Ugandan agro-tourism and education.

Bakirya now runs Busaino Fruits & Trees as an agro-heritage fruit farm of more than 1,000 acres, with a heavy emphasis on agro-tourism and education regarding environmentally sustainable farming practices. In 2019, this work led to her recognition as one of the BBC's "100 Women" for the year.
