= Mengo Notes =

- Type: Weekly newspaper
- Founder: The Church Missionary Society
- Publisher: Industrial Mission Press
- Founded: 1900
- Ceased publication: November 1961
- Language: English
- Country: Uganda
- Sister newspapers: Ebifa mu Buganda

Mengo Notes was the first newspaper in Uganda that started publication in 1900 by The Church Missionary Society (CMS) under the Industrial Mission Press. This English-language monthly publication primarily focused on religious matters, "reflecting the CMS's evangelical mission in the region".

== History ==
Mengo Note later named Uganda Notes was the first Newspaper in Uganda that stated publication in 1900 by The Church Missionary Society (CMS) in Mengo under the Industrial Mission Press.

After three months, the newspaper was renamed Uganda Notes to better represent its broader scope beyond the Mengo and Buganda at large. The publication "served as a vital communication link for the CMS", circulating religious teachings, news, and information relevant to the Anglican community and the colonial administration.

To appeal to the locals, in 1907, the CMS sought to widen its journalistic reach with the introduction of Ebifa mu Buganda, a Luganda-language newspaper. The new move targeted a larger audience and met the increasing literacy rate of Ugandans.

Uganda Notes stopped circulation in November 1961, bringing an end of a certain era in Ugandan print media history.

== Impact ==
The newspaper played a significant role in the early media landscape of pre-independence Uganda, providing a platform for news and discussions relevant to the community at the time.

== See also ==
- List of newspapers in Uganda
