= Lipoota =

- Type: Weekly newspaper
- Founder: Tamale Mirundi
- Publisher: Lipoota Publications
- Editor-in-chief: Tamale Mirundi
- Founded: July 1993
- Ceased publication: 1997
- Country: Uganda
- Sister newspapers: The Voice

Lipoota was a Uganda weekly newspaper published by Lipoota Publications between 1993 and 1997. The newspaper paper was founded by Tamale Mirundi who served as its editor-in-chief for all the time it was in publication. The paper was known for investigative journalism

== See also ==
- List of newspapers in Uganda
- Tamale Mirundi
