= Sheila Nduhukire =

Ugandan journalist

- Born: 1990 (age 35–36); Kiruhura District
- Citizenship: Uganda
- Education: Mbarara university
- Alma mater: Uganda Martyr's SS Namugongo
- Occupation: Journalist

Sheila Nduhukire (born 23 April 1990) is a Ugandan journalist, news editor and senior anchor with NBS Television and a fellow of 2017 International Women's Media Foundation (IWMF) Great Lakes Reporting Initiative cohort.

Sheila is a former senior News anchor with NTV Uganda. Her investigative reporting is specialized in current political affairs, dysfunctions of the economy, and social matters.

== Background and education ==
Sheila is a second born of seven in Kazo, Kiruhura District, She went to Uganda Martyr's SS Namugongo for Uganda Certificate of Education (UCE) for lower secondary education, after she joined Bweranyangi Girls' SS for her advanced secondary level known as Uganda Advanced Certification of Education (UACE) and later she enrolled at Mbarara University of Science and Technology (MUST) for a Bachelor of Business Administration, where she was elected as the student's guild president. Furthermore, she completed her Masters in Business Administration (MBA) at the Eastern and Southern Africa Management Institute (ESAMI) in Arusha, Tanzania. Sheila also obtained a Chevening scholarship to study an MA at Cardiff University, United Kingdom.

== Family ==
Sheila is currently married to Derrick Kakonge who is the Chief Executive Officer(CEO) of security plus solutions with whom she has a son.

== Journalism career ==
After finishing her studies from MUST, she worked as reporter for Red Pepper, a local tabloid newspaper and later received an internship placement at the Ugandan Parliament while working as a freelance journalist with Daily Monitor. Prior to working with NTV Kenya, she was a former employee of NTV Uganda which she also left and joined NBS Television. Sheila had her last show at NBS Television on Thursday 29 April 2021.

Sheila currently serves as the Principle Public relations officer at National Medical Stores (NMS); a role in which she replaced Dan Kimosho who retired to join politics.
