= Rugyendo =

Rugyendo is a surname. Notable people with the surname include:

- Arinaitwe Rugyendo, Ugandan author
- Mukotani Rugyendo (born 1949), Ugandan poet
