= Voice of Uganda =

Former Ugandan government newspaper

- Publisher: Ministry of Information and Broadcasting (Uganda)
- Ceased publication: 1978
- Relaunched: 1979
- Language: English
- City: Kampala
- Country: Uganda
- OCLC number: 2182032

Voice of Uganda was a Government owned English-language newspaper in Uganda founded in 1972. It was published by the then Ministry of Information and Broadcasting.

== Background ==
The Voice of Uganda was founded in 1955 as the Uganda Argus by Tiny Rowland. In 1971, when President Idd Amin banned the distribution of all foreign-originating newspapers claiming they belonged to "confusing agents", the then Uganda Argus became the Voice of Uganda. It was considered the official mouth piece of Idd Amin, hence the nickname the "Voice of Amin".

After the overthrow of President Idd Amin in 1979, the incoming regime took it on and published it under a new name – Uganda Times.

== Legacy ==
The evolution of Uganda's major newspapers, culminating in the establishment of the New Vision involved a series of name changes and transitions. The Uganda Argus evolved into the Voice of Uganda. This further evolved into the Uganda Times.

In 1986, The Government of Uganda inherited the Uganda Times, and renamed it the New Vision.

== See also ==
- List of newspapers in Uganda.
- New Vision
- Uganda Argus
