= The Rwenzori Times =

Ugandan newspaper

- Type: Magazine
- Founder(s): Wesley Kambale
- Publisher: Rwenzori Times Media Limited
- Founded: April 2, 2015
- Language: English
- Headquarters: Plot 21, Stanley Street, Kasese, Uganda
- Website: Official Website

The Rwenzori Times (abbreviated as RT) is an independent, first ever and biggest news website and magazine in Rwenzori region. The news website and magazine are owned and published by the Rwenzori Times Media Limited, with its offices and printing on Stanley Street, in the Central Town of Kasese, Uganda.

The Rwenzori Times' magazine which was first launched in May 2016 has the second-largest circulation, behind The Independent Magazine - Uganda, and the largest circulation among the districts of Rwenzori with over 10,000 copies being sold daily.

The Rwenzori Times is ranked 1st in Rwenzori by online readership with more than 1,000,000 online readers across the world.

== Location ==
The head office of The Rwenzori Times and the Rwenzori Times Media Limited, is located at Plot 21, Stanley Street (Rwenzori Road) in the Central Town of Kasese, Uganda's second largest industrial city.

== See also ==
- List of newspapers in Uganda
- Media in Uganda
