= Bashir Kazibwe =

Ugandan journalist, entrepreneur, and politician

Kazibwe Bashir Mbaziira
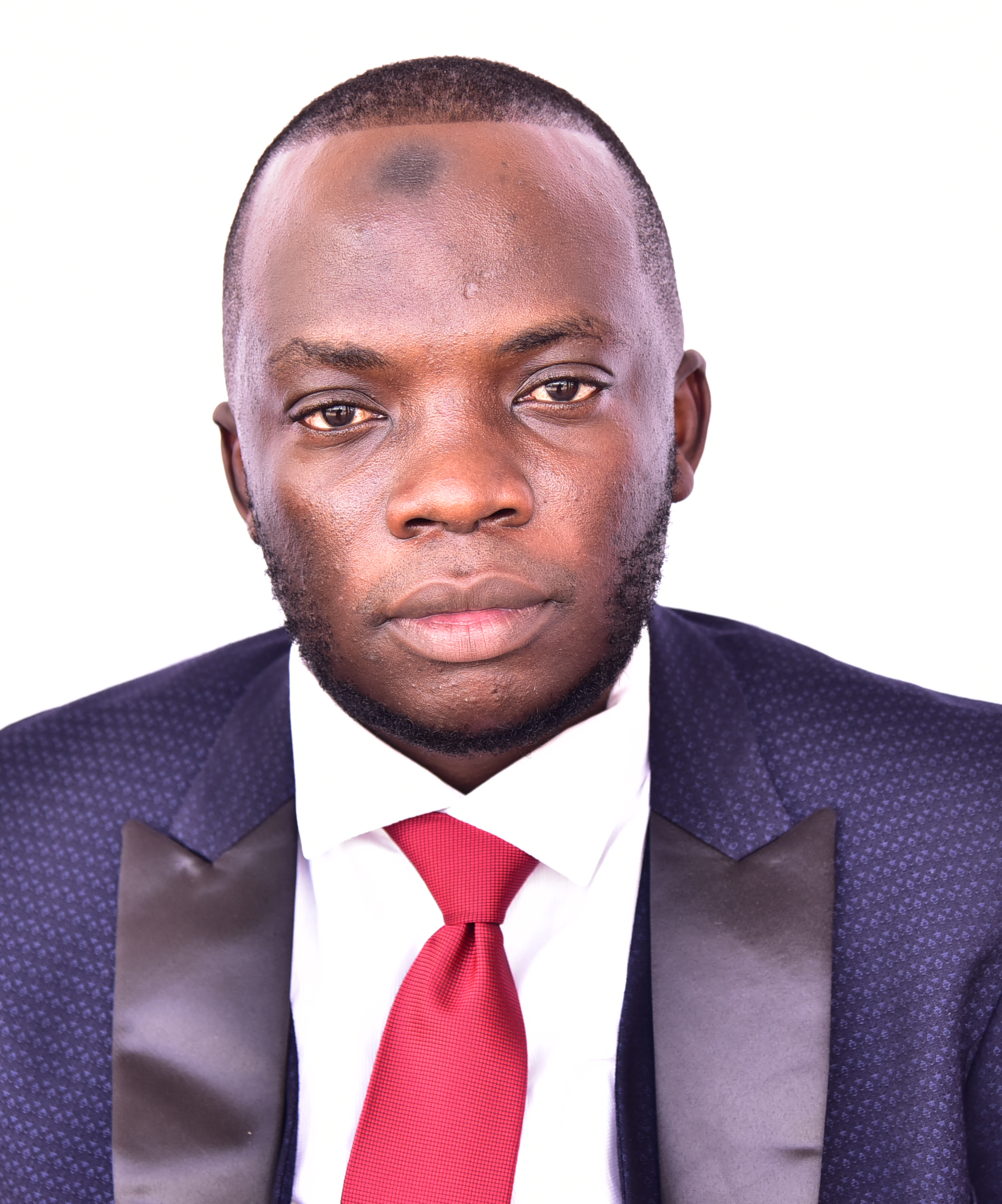
- Kazibwe Bashir Mbaziira in 2021

Member of Parliament for Kawempe South
- In office 2021–2026
- Succeeded by: Madina Nsereko

Personal details
- Born: 8 October 1986 (age 39) Bukomansimbi, Masaka District, Uganda
- Party: Democratic Front (2025–present)
- Other political affiliations: National Unity Platform (until 2025)
- Spouse: Zulfah Kazibwe
- Education: Islamic University in Uganda (bachelor's in Journalism), postgraduate diploma in Investigative Journalism
- Occupation: Journalist, Entrepreneur, Politician
- Known for: Media career, Political career

Kazibwe Bashir, also known as Kazibwe Bashir Mbaziira (born on 8 October 1986), is a Ugandan journalist, entrepreneur, and politician. He served as the member of Parliament for Kawempe South constituency, Kampala District in the 11th Parliament of Uganda from 2021 to 2026. He did not seek re-election in the 2026 Ugandan general elections, after which Madina Nsereko was elected to represent the constituency in the 12th Parliament of Uganda.

== Early life and education ==
Kazibwe was born on 8 October 1986 in Bukomansimbi, a locality that was then part of Masaka District, to Rukia Nakalema (mother) and Abudallah Kazibwe (father). After the demise of his parents, he was brought up by his grandmother Janat Namuli in Masaka District.

He attended Kabaseegu Universal Pentecostal Primary School, later joining Mende Kalema Secondary School in Wakiso District for his O-level education and Kibibi Secondary School in Butambala District for his A-level education. He obtained a bachelor’s degree in Journalism from the Islamic University in Uganda (IUIU) and a postgraduate diploma in Investigative Journalism from a media institution in Turkey.

== Career ==
=== Media career ===
Kazibwe began his journalism career at Voice of Africa Radio before working with Pearl FM, Suubi FM, Bukedde FM, and NBS Television. At NBS, he became known for hosting current-affairs programmes including One on One with Tamale Mirundi, Ensi n'Ebayo, and The Eagle.

In September 2018, Kazibwe was elected president of the Uganda Journalists Association (UJA). He is also the founder of Nyce Radio, an online radio station, and Green Field Media Academy, a media-training institution.

In July 2020, he resigned from NBS Television to pursue his political ambitions. After leaving NBS, he launched a new talk-show collaboration with Tamale Mirundi on STV, which he also later quit.

=== Political career ===
Kazibwe ran for and was elected as a member of the parliament for Kawempe South Division in the 2021 Uganda general elections on the National Unity Platform (NUP) ticket.

He left the National Unity Platform and joined the Democratic Front, a political formation led by Mathias Mpuuga, on 21 June 2025.

== Personal life ==
Kazibwe is married to Zulfah Kazibwe.

He is a practicing Muslim.

== See also ==
- List of members of the eleventh Parliament of Uganda
