= Samuel Sejjaaka =

Ugandan accountant and businessman

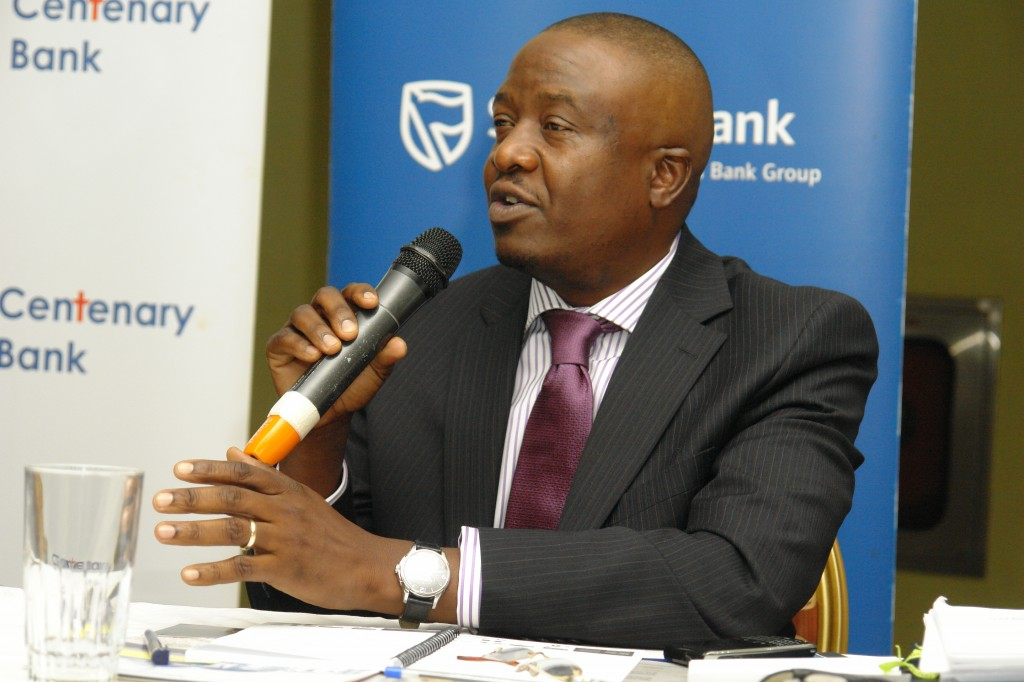
- Born: 10 January 1964 (age 62); Mulago, Uganda
- Citizenship: Uganda
- Education: Makerere University (Bachelor of Commerce); Makerere University (Diploma in Computer Science); Institute of Certified Public Accountants of Uganda (certified public accountant); Association of Chartered Certified Accountants (Fellow); University of Strathclyde (Master of Science); Makerere University (Doctor of Philosophy)
- Occupations: Accountant, university professor, businessman
- Years active: 1988 — present
- Title: Associate professor of accounting and finance Abacus Business School

Samuel Kisakye Sejjaaka is a Ugandan accountant, academic and businessman. He is Principal and Country Team Leader at MAT ABACUS Business School. Between 1993 and 2014, he lectured at Uganda's oldest tertiary institution, Makerere University (later the Makerere University Business School) and rose to the position of Deputy Principal. In December 2014, he retired from the institution at age 50. He then helped establish Abacus Business School, Uganda's premier executive education institution. In 2019, Abacus Business school merged with the Management Accountancy Training Company (MAT) to form MAT ABACUS Business School.

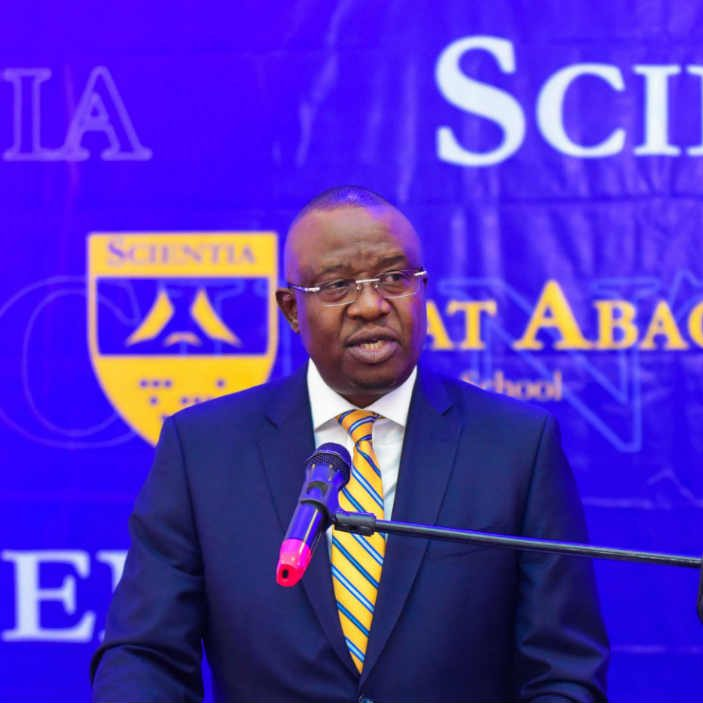
Dr. Sejjaaka at the MAT ABACUS launch (2019)

== Background and education ==
His Doctor of Philosophy in accounting and finance was obtained from Makerere University. Sejjaaka is a fellow of the Association of Chartered Certified Accountants and a Certified Public Accountant.

== Professional career ==
Samuel Sejjaaka is a partner in Sejjaaka, Kaawaase & Company, Certified Public Accountants. The firm was previously part of SNG Africa Group, South Africa's largest black-owned auditing and accounting practice that later merged with Grant Thornton. He founded the firm as Skill Consultants in 1988 and it is currently one of the largest indigenous accounting firms in Uganda.

Dr. Sejjaaka has served since 2015 as chairman of the board at UAP- Old Mutual Financial Services and Director since 2009 at UAP Life Insurance.

Dr. Sejjaaka served as a deputy chairman of the board and a Director at Stanbic Bank (Uganda) Limited, the largest commercial bank in the country from 2007 to 2017.

Between 2012 and 2018, he served as Chairman of Uganda Development Bank (UDBL) a development finance institution established by the Government of Uganda. The main objective of UDBL is to promote and finance development in various sectors of the economy with particular emphasis on agriculture, industry, tourism, housing, and commerce. During his tenure at UDBL, several changes took place at the bank and there were several staff exits which also occasioned several court battles. At the same time however, he introduced several radical changes that saw the bank reduce its non performing assets, return to profitability and also rebrand itself. The government also offered to recapitalise the Bank with an additional US$145 million, on account of the restructuring efforts that had been undertaken. Today the Bank boasts of a Fitch rating and has been voted by the African Association of Development Finance Institutions (AADFI) as one of the best Development Finance Institutions in Africa.

From 2009 until 2014, he served as the deputy principal at the Makerere University Business School. After leaving Makerere in 2014, he founded Abacus Business School (ABS) to provide high-quality education and training for industry and business practitioners across all sectors and levels of management. In 2019, Abacus Business School became MAT ABACUS Business School, an institution that was formed as the result of a merger with the Management and Accountancy Training Company (MAT).

In May 2019, Dr. Sejjaaka was appointed by The Minister of Finance Matia Kasaija, to chair the inaugural seven member Investment Advisory Committee (IAC) of the Petroleum Fund, a requirement under section 66 of the Public Finance Management Act (PFMA) 2015. The major role of the committee is to advise on the investments to be made under the Petroleum Revenue Investment Reserve (PRIR). The committee is part of the governance framework that will ensure that the proceeds from oil and gas, being a non-renewable resource are wisely invested in accordance with international best practice and to the benefit of the current and future generations.

In January 2022, Dr. Sejjaaka was appointed board chairman of Daily Monitor/Monitor Publications, the largest independent newspaper in Uganda, additionally, he was appointed as a Non-Executive Director of Nation Media Group, a media conglomerate, based in Nairobi, Kenya and whose shares are listed on the Nairobi Stock Exchange and are cross-listed on the Uganda Securities Exchange, with a controlling interest in Monitor Publications.

In July 2026, Dr. Sejjaaka was appointed as a Non-Executive Director to the Board of Directors of NIC Holdings Limited, a prominent insurance and financial services company listed on the Uganda Securities Exchange. His appointment, which was officially ratified by shareholders during the company’s 25th Annual General Meeting on July 31, 2026, followed a major corporate restructuring driven by the entry of Cornerstone Asset Managers. Representing the incoming local institutional investor, Professor Sejjaaka joins the leadership team to help guide the strategic turnaround and growth of the insurer as it transitions back to fully Ugandan ownership.

His working experience includes over 25 years in public finance management and systems design. He worked with the Ministry of Finance, Planning and Economic Development as a financial and fiscal systems consultant in the areas of public expenditure, budget management, and fiscal policy planning. He has also worked as a financial consultant and auditor for public sector and private sector organizations for over twenty-five years.

== See also ==
- Association of Chartered Certified Accountants
- Makerere University
- University of Strathclyde
