= Munnansi =

- Type: Weekly newspaper (English & Luganda), Acholi (monthly)
- Founder(s): Democratic Party Uganda
- Publisher: African Development Network
- Founded: 1981
- Political alignment: Democrat
- Language: English, Luganda, Acholi
- Ceased publication: 1986
- City: Kampala
- Country: Uganda
- Circulation: 10,000
- Sister newspapers: The Voice

Munnansi (meaning 'Citizen') was a Luganda and English language weekly newspaper in Uganda founded in 1981. It also had a monthly edition written in Acholi

== History ==
After banning of The Citizen, which was considered the "official newspaper of the Democratic Party" and after the 1980 Uganda General Election, Uganda's Democratic Party launched Munnansi that was written in both Luganda and English. Published by the African Development Network, the paper reported mainly on politics

Both English and Luganda editions English consisted of 14 pages with "a circulation of about 10.000 copies". The monthly edition written in Acholi had the same number pages

The paper ceased publication in 1986 after its editor was arrested for treason

== See also ==
- List of newspapers in Uganda
- Democratic Party(Uganda)
