= Lobo Mewa =

Former Ugandan newspaper

- Owner(s): Verona Fathers
- Founder(s): Angelo Negri
- Publisher: Verona Fathers
- Founded: 1958
- Language: Acholi
- Ceased publication: 1971
- Country: Uganda
- Circulation: 12000

Lobo Mewa (meaning Our World) was an Acholi language publication in Uganda published fortnightly by the Verona Fathers of Gulu.

== Background ==
After purchasing a second hand printing press, the Verona Fathers of Gulu in northern Uganda started publishing Lobo Mewa in 1958 alongside the Leadership magazine. According to Gingyera Pinycwa, the Italian born bishop of Gulu, Angelo Negri of the Verona Fathers started its publication

It was published fortnightly with a circulation of 12,000 copies. It mainly focused on "the propagation of the Catholic faith and the cultivation of an Acholi"

Earlier on in 1954, when a group of Baganda Catholics started a new party “Uganda Democratic Party (DP)”, it spread through the encouragement of some Catholic bishops in the central region who "saw in it a necessary step to fight the unjust discrimination against the human rights of the Catholics".

Father Tarcisio Agostoni of the Comboni Missionaries spread this activism in the northern region by regularly writing in Lobo Mewa which was published in Acholi. The paper was thus known for its activism and "role in the religious, social and political formation of Acholi"

== See also ==
- List of newspapers in Uganda
- Comboni Missionaries in Uganda
