= Arinaitwe Rugyendo =

Ugandan author, journalist and media entrepreneur

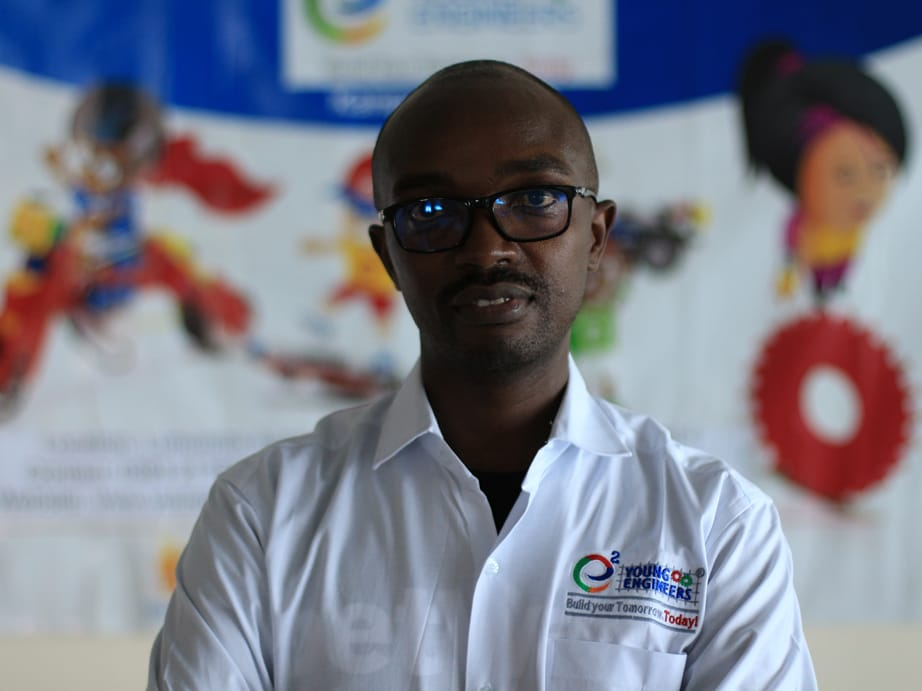
- Rugyendo at Young Engineers convention
- Other name: Deo Rugyendo or Dr.Rugyendo Arinaitwe
- Citizenship: Ugandan
- Education: BA from Makerere University Post Graduate Diploma in Mass Communication – University of Leicester MSc Marketing from Salford University/Robert Kennedy College, PHD in Journalism and Communication.
- Occupations: Author, Journalist, STEM Educator and Media Entrepreneur.
- Years active: SInce 2000
- Employer(s): Red Pepper, e2 Young Engineers Uganda, Daily Monitor, Uganda Premier League, FUFA Super League (FSL).Research Finds News.
- Notable work: Digital Dawn:Toward a Framework for Assessing the Efficacy of ePapers in the Ugandan Press. Leveraging Social Media Marketing for Brand Performance among Ugandan Universities. From Print to Digital:A Historical- Political Economy Narrative of the Emergency and Adoption of ePapers in the Ugandan Press.
- Title: Dr
- Board member of: Red Pepper, Uganda Premier League, FUFA Super League (FSL). Jada Coffee Board chairman

Arinaitwe Rugyendo, also known Deo Rugyendo or D. Rugyendo Arinaitwe, is a Ugandan Author, Journalist, STEM Educator and media entrepreneur. He is the founder and editor-in-chief of Research Finds News and co-founder of Red Pepper (newspaper) founded on 19 June 2001, Uganda's first English tabloid newspaper. He is also the founder of e2 Young Engineers Uganda. Arinaitwe has held various positions such as a cab reporter, bureau chief, managing editor, and digital media editor at renowned publications like Daily Monitor and Red Pepper (newspaper). He was awarded the Archbishop Desmond Tutu Fellowship and the Crans Montana Future Leaders' Award in 2013 as a "new leader of the future " in Switzerland. He was also awarded with the African Young Social and Development Entrepreneur Pap Award 2017.

== Early life and education ==
Arinaitwe earned his Bachelors in Social Sciences from Makerere University in 2000, a Post Graduate Diploma in Mass communication from University of Leicester, UK and MSc Marketing from Salford University/Robert Kennedy College, United Kingdom and Switzerland. He holds a PhD in Journalism and Communication at Makerere University .

== Career ==
Arinaitwe began his profession as a cab reporter at Daily Monitor before assuming the role as Co-Founder at Red Pepper (newspaper) in June 2021. He founded ResearchFinds News in June 2019 which he specializes in newsification of research outputs, research dissemination news coverage, policy briefs, report writing, graduate students mentorship and research methods training. He has also held various roles from Managing Editor to Sales and Marketing. He is the founder and managing director of e2 Young Engineers Uganda which aims to inspire and nurture the next generation of Ugandan Scientists and problem solvers under the age of 17. In 2021, Arinaitwe was appointed Jada Coffee Board Chairman. He is currently the Uganda Premier League(UPL) Board chairman deputized by David Serebe and Chairman of the FUFA Super League (FSL).

== Awards and recognition ==
- African Young Social and Development Entrepreneur Pap Award 2017.
- Crans Montana Future Leaders' Award in 2013.
- 2012 Archbishop Desmond Tutu Leadership Fellow.

== Controversies ==
During his tenure at Pepper Publications, where he held the position of chief marketing officer, Arinaitwe, along with seven colleagues, encountered apprehension by the Ugandan police in 2017. Following this incident, he was later granted bail. Five directors, including Rugyendo, who are also co-owners of the company, along with three editors of Red Pepper (newspaper) and Bwino newspapers, were charged on November 27 with three counts of libel, three counts of offensive communication, and one count of publishing information that is prejudicial to security. Prosecutors brought forward charges in relation to an article that was published on November 20 in Red Pepper (newspaper). The article claimed that Ugandan President Yoweri Museveni had intentions of overthrowing Rwandan President Paul Kagame. The article cited anonymous sources, according to reports from Reuters. Uganda's foreign ministry accused Red Pepper (newspaper) of republishing a "malicious" article that had originally been released by a Rwandan media outlet. Recent reports from newspapers in Uganda have highlighted tensions between Uganda and Rwanda.

In 2007, Rwacumika wanted Red Pepper (newspaper) wound up as he alleged that his fellow directors were sidelining him and were running the campany in high-handed manner to the forging his signature for bank withdrawals. Rwacumika is said to have co-founded The Pepper Publication together with Jame Mujuni, Richard tusiime, Dennis Sabiiti, Patrick Mugumany and Arinaitwe Rugyendo.
