= Africell Uganda =

Ugandan telecommunications company

Coordinates: 00°19′09″N 32°35′24″E

Africell Uganda Limited
- Company type: Private
- Industry: Telecommunications
- Founded: 2014 Closed 2021
- Defunct: 1 October 2021
- Headquarters: 28–30 Clement Hill Road; Nakasero, Kampala, Uganda
- Key people: Ziad Dalloul; Group Chairman and Group CEO
- Services: Telecommunications; IT
- Website: africell.ug

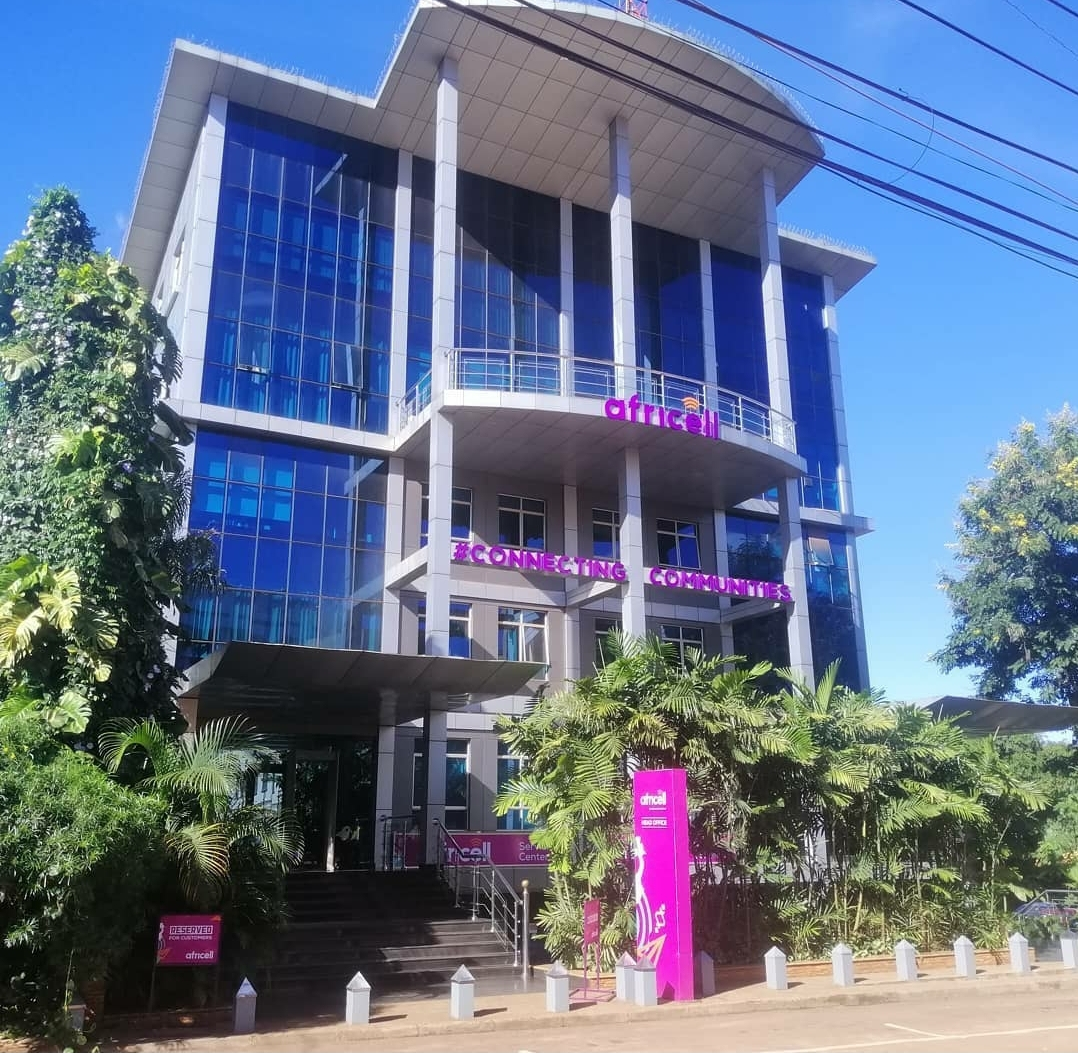
Africell's main office in Kampala, Uganda

Africell Uganda, whose full legal name was Africell Uganda Limited (AUL), was an information and communication technology network company in Uganda. It was the third-largest telecommunications company in the country, by customer numbers. However, the company closed all its businesses in Uganda in 2021 based on a careful assessment of the long-term commercial outlook for the business.

== Location ==
The headquarters and main office of AUL were located in the Africell Office Building, at 28–30 Clement Hill Road, on Nakasero Hill in the Central Division of Kampala, the capital and largest city in the country. The coordinates of the company headquarters are 0°19'09.0"N, 32°35'24.0"E (Latitude:0.319169; Longitude:32.589992).

== History ==
Africell Uganda was established in May 2014, when Africell acquired the majority stake that Orange Telecom owned in its Uganda cellular network. Africell paid $12 million for that stake, inheriting an estimated 1,000,000 subscribers. In November 2014, the Group Chairman and CEO announced plans to invest US$150 million in the next five years, to upgrade the Africell network in Uganda.

== Subscribers ==
In 2014, the network subscribers in Uganda were estimated at one million. As of September 2018, its subscriber customer numbers had risen to 2.1 million. In April 2020, the company's website gives the number of subscribers as over 3,000,000. The table below illustrates the progressive customer growth for the company.

Africell Uganda Subscriber Numbers
Rank	Date	Subscribers	Notes
1	December 2013	625,000	
2	May 2014	1,000,000	
3	September 2018	2,100,000	
4	April 2020	3,000,000	

== Ownership ==
The table below summarizes the shareholding in the business.

Africell Uganda Stock Ownership
Rank	Name of Owner	Percentage Ownership
1	Africell	53.0
2	Hits Telecom Holding	47.0
	Total	100.00

== Operations ==
In 2018, Africell Holdings, the parent company of Africell Uganda, secured a loan of US$100 million from the Overseas Private Investment Corporation (OPIC), to expand operations in Uganda and the Democratic Republic of the Congo. Africell Holdings maintains subsidiaries in the Gambia, Sierra Leone, DR Congo and Uganda. As of January 2015, Africell Uganda maintained coverage in the majority of Uganda's geographical area.

== Closure and exit from Uganda ==
In September 2021 the company announced that it would close business and exit the country, 7 October 2021. At the time of its closure, the Telcom had an estimated 3 million subscribers, accounting for about four percent(4%) market share.

== See also ==
- Communications in Uganda
- List of mobile network operators in Uganda
