= New Vision =

Ugandan daily newspaper

- Type: Daily newspaper
- Format: Berliner
- Owner: Vision Group (Ugandan Government majority shareholder)
- Publisher: New Vision Printing & Publishing Company Limited
- Editor: Barbara Kaija until June 30 2026, then Sidney Miria Babanga
- Founded: 1986
- Language: English
- Headquarters: First Street, Industrial Area, Kampala, Uganda
- City: Kampala
- Country: Uganda
- Sister newspapers: Bukedde
- Website: www.newvision.co.ug

The New Vision is a Ugandan English-language daily newspaper. It was established in its current form in 1986 by the Government of Uganda, which holds a majority of its stock. It is the flagship newspaper of the state-owned Vision Group, a multimedia conglomerate, and has the largest circulation among English-language newspapers in Uganda.

== History ==
The English-language newspaper Uganda Argus was founded in 1955 as a British colonial government publication. Following Uganda's independence in 1962, the government of President Milton Obote retained the Uganda Argus as its official paper. After the 1971 coup, the government of Idi Amin renamed the paper the Voice of Uganda. When Amin was overthrown in 1979, the succeeding government renamed it the Uganda Times. The Times suffered an economic collapse in 1985, unable to pay its debts. Several sources indicate that this newspaper became New Vision in 1986. However, Vision Group CEO Robert Kabushenga said that New Vision bought the premises of Uganda Argus, later Uganda Times, but is not its "direct descendant". The first New Vision editor, William Pike, described his inheritance from Uganda Times as two tables and a typewriter. Through multiple regime changes since independence, these newspapers have been organs of the Ugandan government.

New Vision has published facsimile editions of Uganda Argus to celebrate anniversaries of Uganda's independence.

== Ownership and management ==
It is published by the New Vision Printing & Publishing Company Limited, which trades on the Uganda Securities Exchange under the symbol NVL and operates as the Vision Group. The Government of Uganda is the majority shareholder, holding 53.3% of the company's shares.

William Pike was managing director and editor in chief of New Vision 1986-2006, and was credited with maintaining a degree of editorial importance despite government ownership. He resigned in October 2006 amid reports of government pressure.

In 2007 Robert Kabushenga, described as a Ugandan government spokesman mentored by Pike was appointed as CEO. He resigned in January 2021 with suggestions of government pressure. In May 2021, Don Wanyama was appointed as the new Managing Director and CEO of Vision Group.

Els De Temmerman was chief editor 2006-2010. Appointed by Kabushenga, she attributed her departure to editorial interference. Barbara Kaija was Editor-in-Chief 2010-2026; she was succeeded by Sidney Miria Babanga in June 2026.

== Circulation and finances ==
In the last quarter of 2019, the largest newspaper circulation in Uganda was Vision Group's Luganda-language daily Bukedde with circulation of 33,289 print copies. New Vision had a circulation of 23,636 copies, and the Daily Monitor had a circulation of 16,169 copies.

New Vision posted a loss of USh 856.9 million in the last 6 months of 2025, the third year of losses in a row. Chief Executive Don Wanyama attributed this to "media newspaper sales and advertising revenue spend across the different platforms that is still recovering coupled with the increase in prices of raw material inputs and other operational costs."

== Threats to journalists ==
On February 14, 2018, New Vision investigative journalist Charles Etukuri was abducted outside the newspaper's offices. New Vision said that it suspected retaliation for two articles published by Etukuri linking the Internal Security Organization and the Chieftaincy of Military Intelligence to the death of a foreign businessman. The police and military said that they had no information, while the Internal Security Organization declined to comment. He was dropped outside the company offices on February 19.

Several New Vision journalists have been threatened or arrested based on their reporting over illegal logging and deforestation. John Unzima received multiple threats from Ugandan politicians over his investigative reporting in this area during 2020-2022; he was detained by the Ugandan army, and was forced to leave his home city for four months for his safety. Agnes Nantambi had equipment confiscated after reporting on forest destruction.

Economic issues also affect journalists. A New Vision journalist was reported as saying: "You only get paid for your stories that are published, so you don't want to write a sensitive story that might not get published because then you won't get paid."

== See also ==
- Media in Uganda
- List of newspapers in Uganda
