= Rachael Mwine Arinaitwe =

Ugandan journalist, news anchor, moderator and media personality

- Tibarokoka
- Born: 17 December 1983 (age 42); Najjanankumbi, Kampala
- Citizenship: Ugandan
- Education: Joy primary school, Gayaza High School, Migadde College, Uganda Christian University
- Occupations: Journalist, news anchor, moderator, and media personality
- Successor: Sandra Kahumuza Twinoburyo

Rachael Mwine Arinaitwe also known as Rachael Arinaitwe Tibarokoka Mwine (born on 17 December 1983) is a Ugandan Journalist, news anchor, moderator and media personality who worked with NTV Uganda.

== Early life and education ==
Rachael was born to Lilian (mother) who manages a day-care centre and Clement Tibarikoka (father) a pastor and a veterinary doctor. She is the second child of four siblings - two boys and two girls. Rachael grew up in Najjanankumbi and later Kyebando in Kampala, Uganda. She went to Joy primary school for her Primary education. She then joined Gayaza High School for her O-level education and Migadde College for A-level education. She then joined Uganda Christian University where she did Mass communication and she majored in public relations.

== Career ==
After Campus, Rachael first worked for Spirit FM, then with Power FM Radio for five years before she joined the NTV Uganda where she worked for seven years up October 25, 2018 when she resigned. She then joined Andela, an international training and placement company for software developers that officially launched in Uganda, in July 2018. Rachael was also the Red Sofa Sessions by Red Enterprises that happened on March 1, 2018.

== Personal life ==
Rachael prays from Deliverance Church in Makerere and is married to Ben Mwine a radio personality since September 28, 2013 when they had their wedding. They first met at Power FM when she was looking for the news anchor job in 2008.She loves watching football, eating rice, pork and chapati as her favorite meal.

== See also ==
- NTV Uganda
- Sheila Nduhukire
