= Tamale Mirundi =

Ugandan journalist (1964–2024)

Joseph Tamale Mirundi
- Born: 30 June 1964; Rakai District, Uganda
- Died: 13 August 2024 (aged 60); Uganda
- Education: Makerere University
- Occupations: Author, journalist, presidential press secretary and media advisor
- Political party: National Resistance Movement
- Parent(s): Molly Namatovu and Yowana Mirundi
- Website: kab.news

Joseph Tamale Mirundi (30 June 1964 – 13 August 2024) was a Ugandan journalist, author and political analyst.

== Early life and education ==
Joseph Tamale Mirundi was born to Namatovu Molly and Yowana Mirundi from Matale-Kalagala Village, Kyotera District, as their ninth child.

He is said to have moved to Kampala in 1979 to pursue secondary education. He initiated his career in journalism at Munno newspaper during his third year of senior school. He held a bachelor's degree in Mass Communication from Makerere University.

He initiated two independent newspaper publications, The Voice and Lipoota, after graduating.

== Career ==
Tamale appeared on prominent television stations like NBS and STV, and other media channels like radio and social media platforms for political shows, such as Sharp Talk with Tamale Mirundi on STV. In 2022, Tamale started an online newspaper, Kab News, where he published news and information. He previously appeared on NBS Television on the One on One show. In 2021, he joined STV Uganda on The Sharp Talk show and Embuga, which were aired twice a week. He was a former presidential press secretary and media advisor.

In 2017, he was suspended from the One On One show for use of abusive language.

He was rewarded by Ugandan President Yoweri Kaguta Museveni with a new car for his media work.

Tamale predicted the downfall of Eric Sakwa. He predicted that the party People Power, Our Power under Bobi Wine would have more seats after the 2021 elections.

In 2015, his first wife, Juliet Nassimbwa, wanted to divorce him due to political differences.

He alleged that he was poisoned in 2019. He was also taken to court by lawyer Mabirizi over defamation.

In 2015, judges urged president Museveni to fire Tamale over inciting violence in citizens.

As of 16 June 2020, Tamale ended his appearances on the One on One show at NBS Television. The following day, he announced that the show would be available on Facebook and YouTube until further notice.

== Death ==
Tamale died from lung disease at Kisubi Hospital, on 13 August 2024, where he had been hospitalised for a month. He was 60.

Tamale is remembered as a bold journalist whose raw critique of authority sparked both conversation and controversy.
