= East African Business Week =

Weekly Ugandan newspaper

- Type: Weekly newspaper
- Publisher: East African Business Week Limited
- Founded: 2005
- Language: English
- Headquarters: 133 Kira Road, Kamwookya; Kampala, Uganda
- Website: Homepage

East African Business Week is a weekly Ugandan newspaper published in Kampala, Uganda's capital and largest city. It is the only exclusively business weekly published in the country.

== Location ==
The newspaper headquarters and main office are located in Media Plaza Building, at 133 Kira Road, in the Kamwokya neighborhood, in Kampala, about 4.5 kilometres (3 mi) north of the city's central business district. The coordinates of the newspaper headquarters are 0°20'17.0"N, 32°35'05.0"E (Latitude:0.338053; Longitude:2.584730).

== Overview ==
EABW maintains five bureaus, one in each of the five East African cities of Kampala, Nairobi, Kigali, Bujumbura, and Dar es Salaam. The newspaper covers investment and business news, together with health and technology news in Burundi, Kenya, Rwanda, Tanzania, and Uganda. It is published in English only. It has print and Internet versions.

== History ==
The paper was founded in 2005. It is published by East Africa Business Weekly Limited.

== See also ==
- List of newspapers in Uganda
- Media in Uganda
