= The Uganda Herald =

Former English language newspaper

- Uganda's Oldest Newspaper
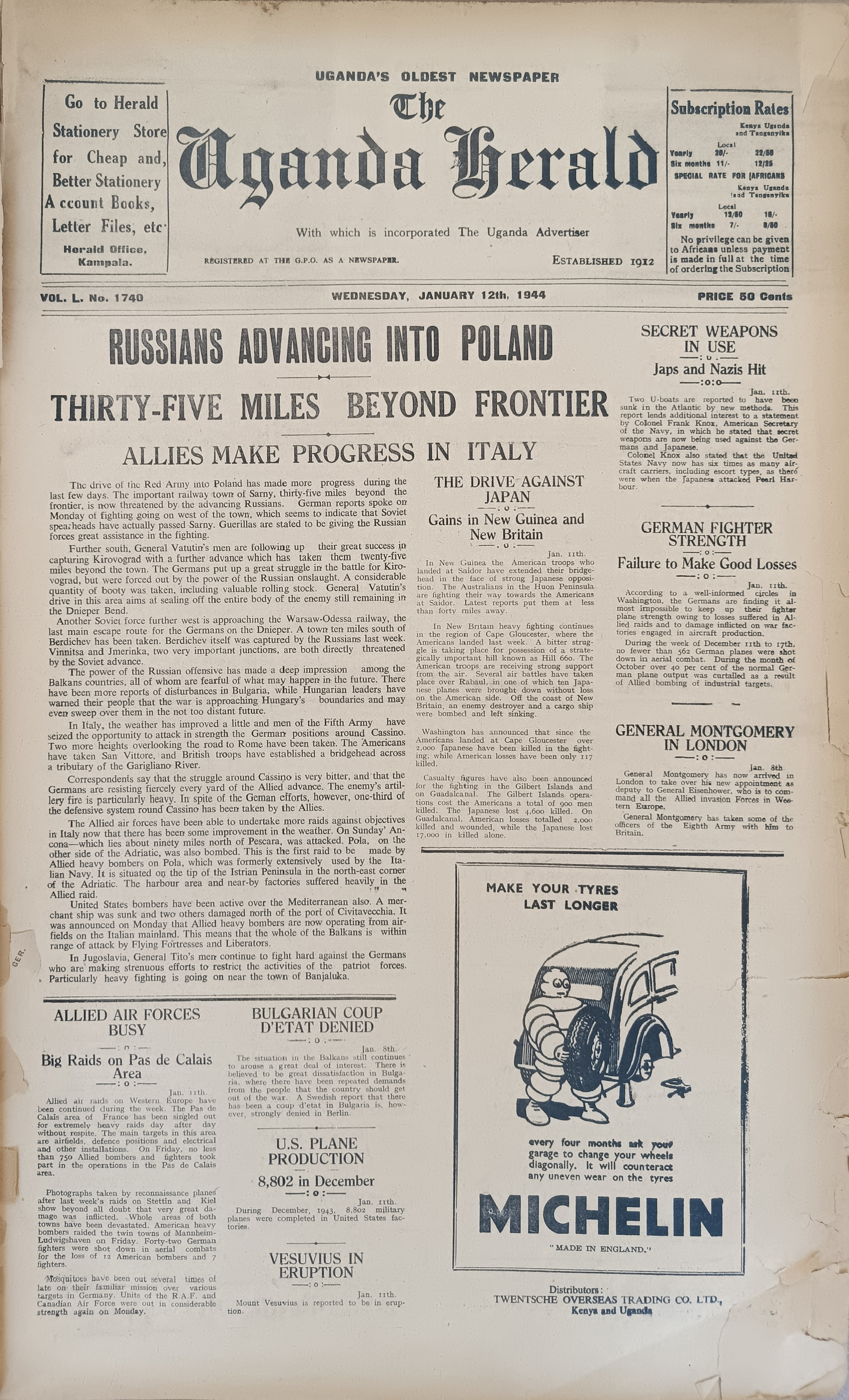
- Type: Tri-weekly newspaper
- Format: Print
- Owner(s): Uganda Printing & Publishing Company Limited
- Founder: Michael Moss
- Founded: 1912
- Ceased publication: 1955
- Language: English
- Headquarters: Kampala
- Country: Uganda
- Sister newspapers: Matalisi
- OCLC number: 12327860

The Uganda Herald was an English-language newspaper in Uganda founded in 1912 and ceased publication in 1955. It was the first privately owned commercial newspaper in Uganda and was published tri-weekly. It was one of Uganda's oldest newspapers.

== Background ==
The newspaper founded by Michael Moss, a British businessman who was living in Uganda

It mainly published news for, and about the British community, with a regular column called "Home News". Although, It was described as the most widely read and most influential newspaper in Uganda, Scholars like Mahmood Mamdani interpreted it as a "mouth piece for settler interests."

The newspaper had a readership of European, Asian and African educated elite.

The Uganda Herald was published for 43 years, and it ceased publication on 13 May 1955.

== Features ==
The Uganda Herald had a number of regular columns and features such as:

=== Topical Topics ===
A regular column that was written by "Janus", "Pandora" and "Sundowner" through the years. It contained book reviews, personal musings on life, wise sayings and the writers personal review of the news of the week.

=== For Women Only ===
A column written by "Pandora" and later "Clarissa" – it focused on fashion and beauty tips for ladies, cooking and baking features, the weather and musings from a "female perspective".

=== Home News ===
A column containing correspondence from Britain

=== Things We Should Like To Know ===
This was a series of normally 5 questions related to the current affairs of the day.
