= Bukedde =

- Type: Daily newspaper
- Publisher: Vision Group
- Editor: Michael Mukasa Ssebbowa
- News editor: Ahmed Mukiibi
- Photo editor: Joseph Makumbi
- Founded: 1994
- Language: Luganda
- Headquarters: First Street, Industrial Area, Kampala, Uganda
- Circulation: 33,290 (as of 2019)
- Website: Homepage

Bukedde
- Type: Daily newspaper
- Format: Tabloid
- Publisher: Vision Group
- Editor: Michael Mukasa Ssebbowa
- News editor: Ahmed Mukiibi
- Photo editor: Joseph Makumbi
- Founded: 1994; 32 years ago
- Language: Luganda, English
- Headquarters: Plot 2/4 Third Street, Industrial Area, Kampala, Uganda
- Circulation: 33,290 (as of 2019)
- Website: www.bukedde.co.ug

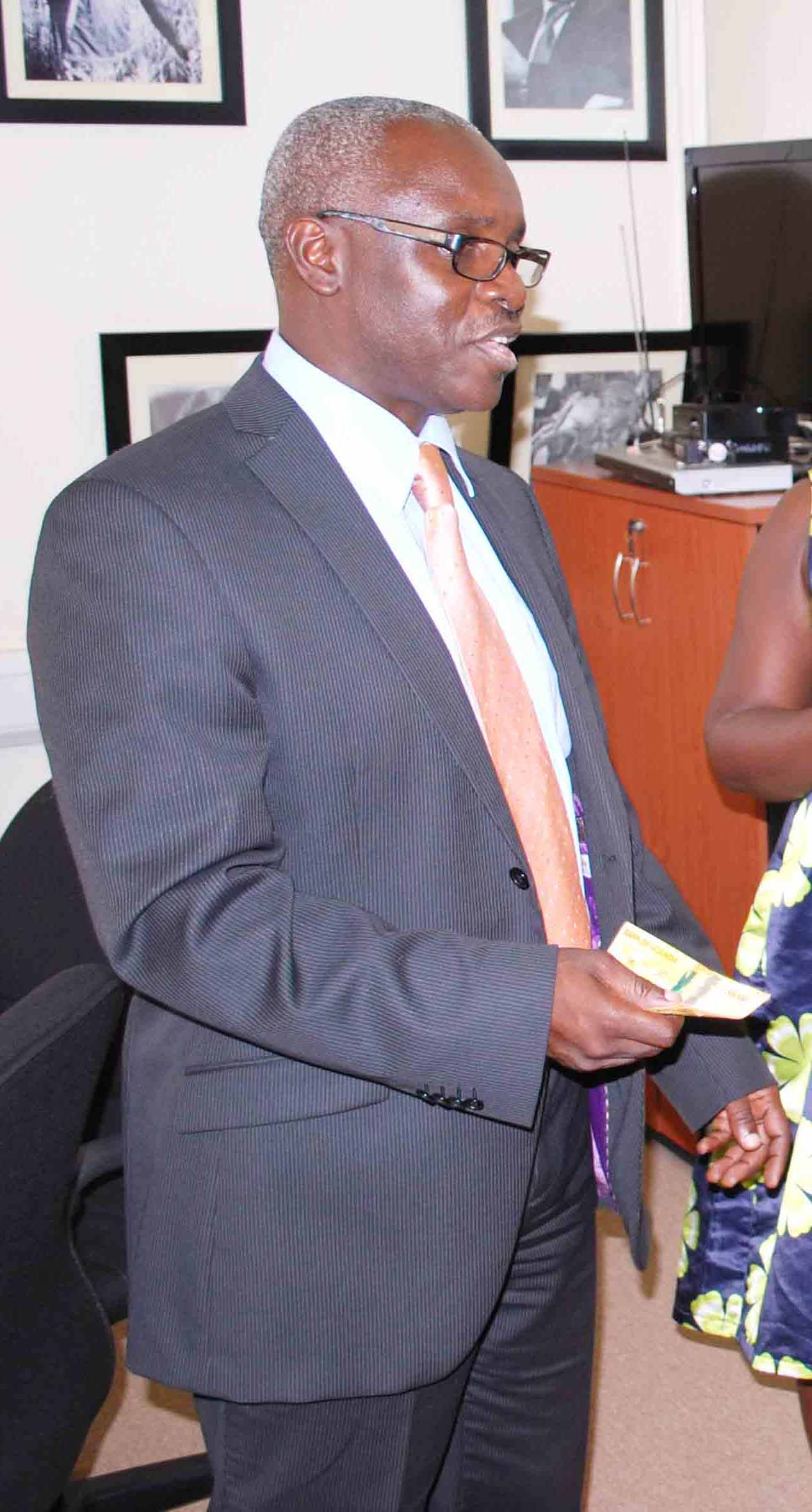
Robert Kabushenga eyaliko ssenkulu w'ekitongole kya Vision Group ekifulumya olupapula lwa Bukedde

Bukedde, is a daily Ugandan newspaper published in Kampala, Uganda. It is the leading daily newspaper in the country for both English and Luganda papers with an estimated daily circulation of about 33,290 copies daily.

== Overview ==
The newspaper is published by the Vision Group, which publishes the New Vision, Uganda's leading English daily newspaper. The publisher also circulates other dailies and weeklies in Ugandan languages, including: (a) Orumuri in Runyakitara (b) Etop in Ateso and Rupiny in Lwo. Bukedde is available in print form and on the Internet.

== History ==
The newspaper was founded in 1994. It is the only newspaper in Uganda that publishes a dedicated section about the Kabaka of Buganda. The name Bukedde, translates loosely into English as Morning Has Come.

== See also ==
- List of newspapers in Uganda
- Media in Uganda
