= .ug =

Internet country code top-level domain for Uganda

- Introduced: 8 March 1995
- TLD type: Country code top-level domain
- Status: Active
- Registry: Uganda Online
- Sponsor: Uganda Online
- Intended use: Entities connected with Uganda
- Actual use: Gets some use in Uganda
- Registration restrictions: None
- Structure: Registrations may be made at second level or at third level beneath various second level labels
- Documents: Terms and conditions
- Dispute policies: UDRP
- DNSSEC: yes
- Registry website: Uganda Online registry

.ug is the Internet country code top-level domain (ccTLD) for Uganda.

== Second-level domains ==
Registrations were traditionally made under these second-level subdomains:

- .co.ug – Commercial entities
- .ac.ug – Educational Institution offering diplomas, degrees and higher academic awards
- .sc.ug – Primary, secondary and lower educational branches
- .go.ug – Government Agencies and independent authorities under government
- .ne.ug – Network providers or special equipment for network provision
- .or.ug – Non governmental institutions
- .org.ug – Non governmental institutions
- .com.ug – Commercial entities
- .med.ug – Medical entities or health institutions
- .ngo.ug – Non governmental organizations in Uganda
- .law.ug – Legal firms and practitioners in Uganda
- .ltd.ug – Commercial companies and business entities in Uganda (public or private limited companies)
- .inc.ug – Commercial companies and business entities in Uganda (corporations)

== Disputes over administration ==
In 2014, Ugandan Members of Parliament called for an investigation after a revelation that a private firm, Infinity Computers and Communication Company (i3c, formerly known as Computer Frontiers), owned Uganda's top-level Internet domain. During a Finance Committee the MPs pressed ICT minister John Nasasira to explain how the private company came to own the domain, which could endanger national security.

The MPs resolved to contact the registrar of companies to furnish them with the details of the proprietors of i3c and asked the minister to explain the circumstances under which the company took over the domain.

Unlike countries like China which put restrictions on the domain purchasing process, Uganda ccTLD managers don't put any restriction on who can register domain names.
