= Eric Sakwa =

Ugandan politician

Eric Joseph Sakwa

Resident District Commissioner, Jinja District

Personal details
- Born: 1982 (age 43–44)
- Party: National Resistance Movement (NRM); formerly Uganda People's Congress (UPC)
- Occupation: Politician, Former Resident District Commissioner
- Known for: Political activism; legal controversies related to COVID-19 directive enforcement

Eric Joseph Sakwa is a Ugandan politician and former Resident District Commissioner of Jinja District. He was the assistant youths leader of Uganda People's Congress in 2005, before joining National Resistance Movement in 2010. He was born in 1982.

== Legal controversies ==
Sakwa was arrested on 24 April 2020 on charges of manslaughter, robbery and malicious damage related to a death of a business man in Jinja, Charles Isaga during the enforcement of COVID-19. With this, he was called for interdiction from his Residential District Commissioner position in matters for illegal Jinja municipal land sale by civil servants. He was also put on two-month leave by the president until he was investigated on over manslaughter.

In July 2025, Sakwa contested the NRM party primary for the Jinja South West Constituency. He suffered a heavy defeat, garnering only 71 votes and finishing fourth in the race. Following the loss, Sakwa led protests in Jinja City, alleging the results were fraudulent and calling for their nullification. Despite news of a reappointment to Kaliro District in late 2022, Sakwa stated in early 2024 that the appointment was never finalized and he remained without a government job.
