= Mass media in Uganda =

The mass media in Uganda includes print, television, radio and online sectors, and coverage is split between both state-run outlets and privately held outlets as well as English-language outlets and Luganda-language outlets.

== Print media ==
There are a number of newspapers in Uganda today. New Vision is Uganda's leading English daily newspaper. It is a state-owned newspaper and has the largest nationwide circulation. The Daily Monitor is an independent English-language newspaper and second in circulation to the New Vision. The two papers dominate the print section of media in Uganda. Over the last decade, as Uganda's political opposition has gained strength, the Monitor has aligned itself more with the agenda of the opposition to counter the perceived government agenda fronted by the New Vision. This competition many times leads to entirely different aspects getting coverage in the five largest news publications in the country. For example, during the recent 2011 Walk To Work protests in the country, various government sources accused the Daily Monitor alongside other independent newspapers of having an anti-government agenda and favoring the opposition and demonstrators.

Besides these two newspapers, there are also other papers, such as Eihwa – a privately owned newspaper published in the Runyankore/Runyakitara language and Bukedde newspaper, which is a state-owned daily published in the Luganda language. There is also a daily called Red Pepper that started out as a weekly tabloid but is now one of the leading daily newspapers. Other papers include The Northern Press published in the city of Gulu, The Weekly Observer, The Independent, The Razor among others. Tabloids abound, with sensationalism and soft erotica common among tabloids like Onion and Entasi.

There are a number of online news websites. Key among these include: The Fast Observer, Nile Chronicles, PML Daily, and UgStandard, ChimpReports, Vanguard News Uganda, Globe News, Kalisho Info, among others.

There are also a number of magazines that come out every month, including Bride & Groom, which is printed by the New Vision; African Woman is another popular magazine. Elyte magazine and Newslex Super Magazine are entertainment-oriented magazines.

== Television ==
Uganda is now driving towards migrating from analog to digital TV broadcasting. The Uganda Communication Commission has launched a country-wide campaign to ensure that users switch to the standard. To access digital TV, users need to have digital-ready TV sets or purchase digital TV decoders. The Commission has licensed up to five firms to sell free-to-air decoders in the country. Users also have the option of subscribing to Digital Pay TV service providers such as DSTV, GoTV, Zuku, SimbaTV and Startimes to access both paid-for and Free-to-air channels.

== Radio ==
Like in television, radio was dominated by the state owned Radio Uganda up until the early 1990s when the first independent radio stations got licenses to operate. Sanyu fm and Capital fm are among the first and oldest radio stations in Uganda. Gradually other stations have joined the media industry and as of November 2013 there are well over 100 different radio stations on FM alone.

Some other popular stations include CBS, Simba, Super, Record FM, and Dembe. Programming on radio is dominated by music, with most stations following a Top 40 format. Talk shows and comedy are also popular.

Radio is now embracing new kind of media and integrating with other communication channels. For instance, Radio stations in Uganda integrate mobile technology in their programming to increase on audience engagement. Listeners can call in to a talk show and contribute their own opinions about what's been talked about.

Radio stations are also using the Internet to widen their reach. Most radio stations use online radio streaming services such as Radiogarden, Odyovi, Listenfmradios.com, Streema and UGO to reach wider audiences than traditional broadcasting can, including Ugandans in the diaspora.

== Internet ==
The internet as a media platform in Uganda is still quite new. Internet penetration levels are still very low when compared to other African countries. The recent Indian Ocean fiber optic cable project brought a lot of optimism and lead to an increased interest in the internet as a media platform. It also led to investment with a number of local telecommunication companies investing into broadband and gprs subscription services. This has led to a surge in levels of internet penetration with almost anyone able to connect to the internet using simple USB dongles or even via mobile phones.

The recent Facebook deal with MTN Uganda made Facebook by far the most popular website in the country and a place where most young and working-class individuals spend a lot of time. The hope is that these new opportunities will spur more individual investments in the internet sector. A number of the local newspapers operate newspapers online. These newspapers, particularly those of Daily Monitor, Ug Standard, New Vision, Kalisho Info, Newslex Point, Nymy Net, and Nile Chronicles, are among the most popular Ugandan websites.

As of 2014, the Uganda Communication Commission (UCC) put mobile Internet subscriptions at 4,196,133 compared to 106,900 fixed Internet subscriptions.

== Media freedom ==
Despite the increased level of media freedom in Uganda over the last decade, there are still calls for more action from government by journalists and media houses to let the media express themselves freely. The recent cases of when CBS radio was shut down by government and also when NTV was shut down by the government on grounds of dissent are prime examples of government pressure on media.

== See also ==
- Andrew Mwenda
- Freedom of the press in Uganda
- Internet censorship and surveillance in Uganda
- List of newspapers in Uganda
- New Vision Group
- Communications in Uganda
- Cinema of Uganda

== Bibliography ==
- "Uganda: Directory: Broadcasting and Communications". Africa South of the Sahara 2004. Regional Surveys of the World. Europa Publications. 2004. p. 1191. ISBN 1857431839.
- Jonathon Green; Nicholas J. Karolides (2005). "Uganda". Encyclopedia of Censorship. Facts on File, Inc. ISBN 978-1-4381-1001-1.
- "Uganda", Freedom of the Press, USA: Freedom House, 2016, archived from the original on 2019-03-21
