= 94.8 XFM =

XFM Uganda
Kampala; Uganda
- Frequency: 94.8 MHz

Programming
- Format: Top 40/CHR

Ownership
- Owner: Vision group
- Sister stations: Bukedde Fm, Radio West, Etop Radio, Arua One, Radio Rupiny

History
- First air date: August 1, 2011

Technical information
- Translator: 96.6 FM Mbarara

Links
- Webcast: radio.visiongroup.co.ug:8000/xfm/
- Website: xfm.co.ug

94.8 XFM is a top 40/CHR radio station based in Kampala, Uganda that focuses on audiences between the ages of 18 and 28.

XFM's signal stretches up to Entebbe, Lugazi and Nkozi. It also streams online.

== Background ==
XFM 94.8 went on air on August 1, 2011. It was formerly "Vision Voice", a station that was re-branded to improve its competitiveness. Some of the key shows on XFM include XAM with DJ Cisse, Iikkle Banji and Daron Bartlett (which airs 6AM to 10AM every weekday), XZIT with Denzel and Lamu (which airs between 3PM and 7PM every weekday), and the Shuffle with Guhi and TXR.
