= Thomson Foundation =

The Thomson Foundation is a media development not-for-profit organisation based in London, United Kingdom but operating worldwide. It was founded in 1962 and was the first charitable foundation with the specific aim of training journalists and communications teams in developing countries. It celebrated its 60th anniversary in 2022/23.

== Mission ==
The goal of the foundation is to promote transparency and media freedom across the world and train journalists in the skills that will help them to perform their role of holding governments and commercial entities to account in the public interest.

It provides practical training for journalists and communications professionals across the globe working with every type of media. Its online academy Journalism Now is a series of interactive courses designed and led by industry experts providing e-learning in digital and multimedia skills.

== History ==
The foundation was established in 1962 by the Canadian media businessman Roy Thomson. It was set up to champion free, fair and open media in the developing world.

An extract from the Trust Deed on the formation of the foundation reads as follows: "Its purpose is the advancement of knowledge and spiritual enlightenment of all peoples enabling them to achieve closer understanding and to play an informed and responsible role in the affairs of their nation and the world. To this end the Foundation’s activities are primarily concerned with the development of modern techniques of mass communications in emergent countries."

For many years, the organisation was based in Cardiff, Wales, and worked closely with Cardiff University's journalism school. In late 2012 it moved to central London and is now based in Camden.

Established in 2017, Thomson Media gGmbH is the Berlin-based partner organisation of the Thomson Foundation group.

== Projects ==
In the past, the foundation has worked in more than 150 countries. Its previous projects include the OPEN Media Hub, a five-year programme which sought to strengthen independent media and professional journalism in 17 of the countries bordering the European Union and create a media sharing platform.

The foundation's other projects have included a long-running programme of work in Sudan, which included training for journalists working in a range of media, Africa Means Business, a project in collaboration with University of Ghana and the African Research Consortium based in Kenya, with funding from the Bill and Melinda Gates Foundation and the Inquirer Awards, which promoted investigative journalism in a number of countries across Asia and the Middle East.

The Thomson Foundation runs an annual digital and multimedia summer course, which sees journalists from across the globe come to the UK for a five weeks of training and work placements.

The foundation has also done a lot of work in China over the past three decades, including encouraging modern journalistic practices in the state news agency Xinhua.

=== Competitions ===
The foundation runs a number of competitions mainly aimed at young journalists to enable them to showcase their work and/or to provide opportunities to take part in study tours and receive mentoring from senior international journalists. The Young Journalist Award has been running annual since 2013 in partnership with the UK Foreign Press Association. The Mobile Journalism competition was launched in conjunction with Mojocon a conference sponsored by Irish Broadcaster RTE in 2015. It is now associated with MojoFest.

The Commonwealth Digital Challenge is a competition aimed at providing young and aspiring media managers from the Commonwealth with the skills and tools necessary to help their organisations face the digital challenges in their countries. It is funded by the Elizabeth R Media Fund and managed by the Thomson Foundation. It was originally established as The Elizabeth R Broadcasting Fund in 1995 to assist the development of broadcasting skills in the Commonwealth with a donation from Buckingham Palace. The donation came from royalties from “Elizabeth R”, the 1992 BBC documentary which marked the 40th anniversary of the reign of Queen Elizabeth II.

=== Online learning ===
Journalism Now is the foundation's online training programme. It is designed to develop journalists' abilities to work across multiple platforms and media.

== Personnel ==
The Foundation's first Director of Studies was Don Rowlands, former editor of the Western Mail in Cardiff. In 1964, he was joined by Tony Crook, then on the Daily Mail, as his deputy. The pair visited numerous countries, training their journalists in their own offices, which was seen as the best way forward after overseas journalists had been to Cardiff for their three-month courses.

Don was exceptionally well-known and respected throughout India and the Middle East, while Tony also worked in India, Lebanon, Afghanistan and Iran. Tony Crook was asked to join The Times when Lord Thomson took it over in 1967. Don died shortly after retiring in 1989.

The organisation's present chief executive is Caro Kriel who is also a board member of the UK independent press regulator, Impress.

Other staff and associates include: managing director - development Federica Varalda, director of research, policy and impact Gary Mundy, director of training and communications Deborah Kelly, and Anton Artemyev, head of development.

Lord Chandos is the chair of the Thomson Foundation, having succeeded Lord Fowler, a former cabinet member in the Thatcher government.
