= The Weekly Observer =

- Type: Weekly newspaper
- Headquarters: 108 N Main St Hemingway, SC 29554
- Website: scnow.com/community/observer

The Weekly Observer is a weekly newspaper based in Hemingway, SC that covers the areas of Hemingway, Johnsonville, Pamplico and Williamsburg County. The paper, now owned by Media General, has been published since 1973. The newspaper features editorial content including columns by correspondents and editors.
