= Uganda Argus =

Ugandan newspaper

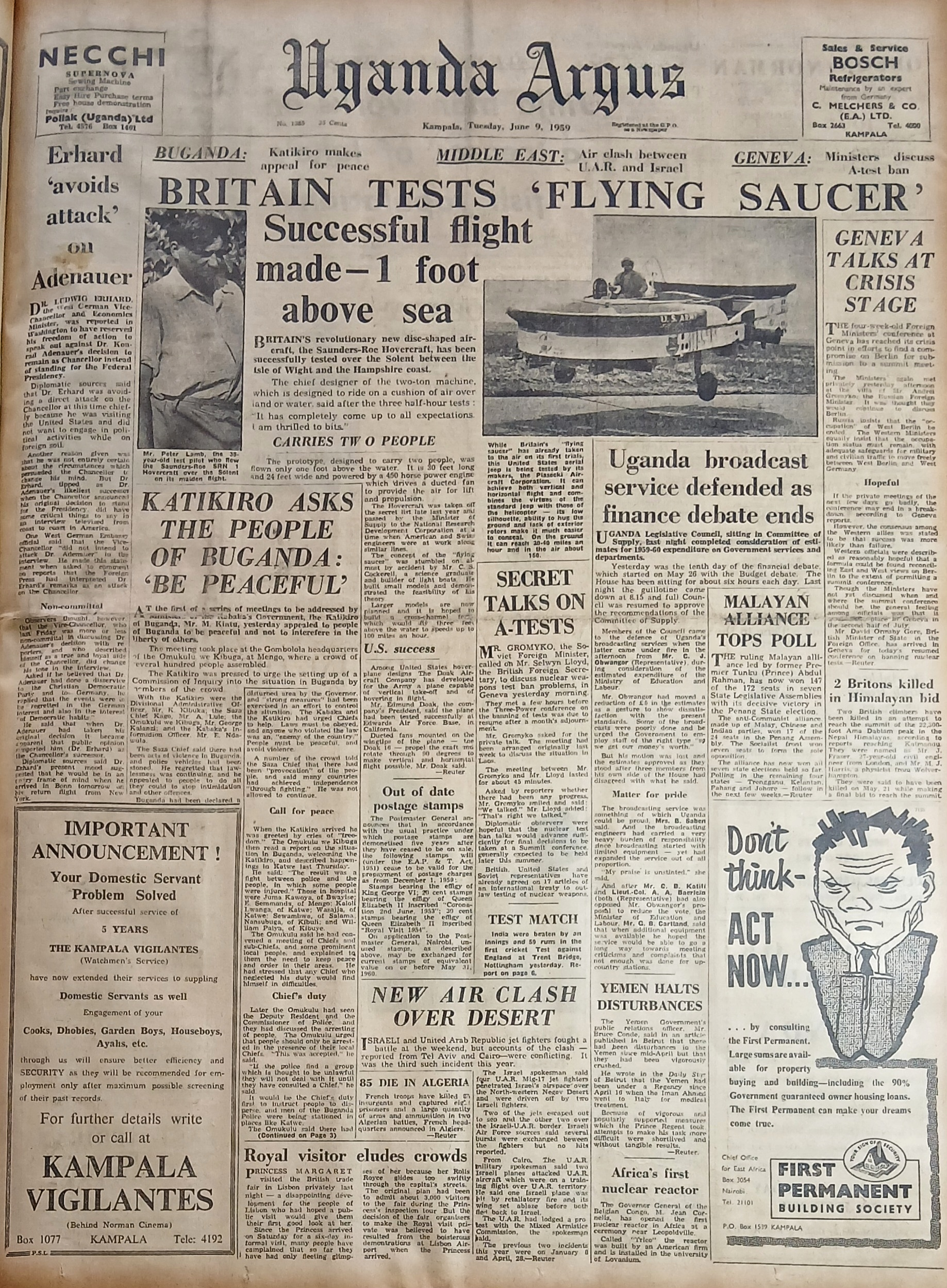
- Type: Daily print Newspaper, Magazine
- Format: Broadsheet
- Owner: British colonial government
- Founder: British colonial government
- Publisher: Ugandan Argus Limited
- Founded: 1955
- Ceased publication: 1971 as New Vision Newspaper
- Language: English
- Country: Uganda
- Circulation: 14200
- OCLC number: 1983955

Uganda Argus was a daily print newspaper and magazine in Uganda, published in Kampala by Uganda Argus Limited.

The newspaper was founded in 1955, seven years before Uganda achieved independence from the British colonial government in 1962. In 1971 it became the New Vision Newspaper.

== See also ==
- Mark Barrington-Ward
- List of newspapers in Uganda
