= The Independent (Uganda) =

Ugandan news magazine

- Type: Newsmagazine
- Owner: Andrew Mwenda
- Founder: Andrew Mwenda
- Editor: Andrew Mwenda
- Founded: 2007
- Language: English
- Headquarters: Kampala, Uganda
- Website: www.independent.co.ug

The Independent is a news magazine published in Kampala, Uganda.

== Overview ==
The magazine covers general and business news. It also has dedicated sections for news analysis, Eastern African regional news and a features section. The magazine is published in glossy print as well as online, in English only.

== History ==
The paper was founded in 2007, by Andrew Mwenda, who owns, edits and publishes the news magazine.

== See also ==
- List of newspapers in Uganda
- Media in Uganda
