= Red Pepper (newspaper) =

Ugandan tabloid newspaper

- Type: Daily newspaper
- Founded: 19 June 2001
- Headquarters: Uganda
- Website: redpepper.co.ug

Red Pepper is a daily tabloid newspaper in Uganda that began publication on 19 June 2001. Mirroring tabloid styles in other countries, the paper is known for its mix of sensationalism, scandal, and frequent nudity. The paper has faced criticism from the Ugandan government over its publication of content described as conspiracy theories relating to the death of Sudan's Vice President John Garang in a helicopter crash and revealing that former foreign minister James Wapakhabulo died of AIDS.

== History ==
In August 2006, Red Pepper published the first names and occupations of prominent Ugandan men who it asserted were gay. This decision was sharply criticized by Human Rights Watch, which said that the publishing could have exposed the men to government harassment because homosexuality in Uganda remained illegal. The following month, Red Pepper published a similar list of 13 women who it claimed were lesbians.

In an interview published in May 2009, the news editor of Red Pepper, Ben Byarabaha, vowed that the tabloid would continue its campaign against alleged homosexuals by publishing their names, photographs, and addresses.

In September 2012, the newspaper was sued about its published nude photo of a herbalist. In January 2018, Red Pepper was reopened by the government.

=== 2013 police raid ===
Uganda Police raided the premises of Red Pepper on 20 May 2013. This happened soon after the paper had published a letter allegedly written by Army General David Sejusa, threatening that those opposing Muhoozi Kainerugaba for presidency risked their lives. Kainerugaba is the son of the long-standing President Yoweri Museveni. The same letter was also published by another Ugandan newspaper, the Daily Monitor, whose offices were also raided. Both daily newspapers remained closed for ten consecutive days, until the siege was lifted on 30 May 2013.

=== Rebranding and eviction ===
Around mid-2021, the company rebranded From Red Pepper to Daily Pepper. However, they later rebranded back to Red Pepper.

In early 2022 the newspaper was evicted from its offices. The company then relocated to Bweyogerere-Buto opposite the UNBS headquarters.

== Available Newspapers ==
- The Red Pepper Newspaper
- The Saturday Pepper
- The Sunday Pepper
- Kamunye News Paper
- Entasi Weekly News Paper

== See also ==
- LGBT rights in Uganda
- Rolling Stone (Uganda)
