= New Vision Group =

Ugandan media company

Coordinates: 00°19′12″N 32°35′58″E

Vision Group
- Type: Publicly Traded Conglomerate
- Industry: Publishing, printing, broadcasting, telecasting
- Founded: 1986; 40 years ago
- Headquarters: 2/4 First Street, Kampala, Uganda
- Key people: Patrick Ayota (chairman); Don Wanyama (CEO)Barbara Kaija (EIC)
- Products: Newspapers, magazines, books, television stations, radio stations
- Revenue: ▲Aftertax: UGX:1.0 billion (2022)
- Total assets: UGX: 85.85 billion (2017)
- Website: www.newvision.co.ug

The Vision Group of Companies, commonly known as the Vision Group, is a multimedia conglomerate in Uganda. It publishes the New Vision (newspaper), an English-language daily newspaper that appears in print form and online, as well as other newspapers and magazines in a variety of Ugandan languages.

== History ==
The group was established in 1986, with the flagship publication, the New Vision newspaper. The company's first managing director was William Pike, who started the year the group launched.

In 2007, a board member of the New Vision Group was allegedly poisoned.

In 2009, the group apologised for publishing a corruption story on Muwenda Mutebi II of Buganda.

The group launched its global mobile application (E-Paper) in 2015 but disabled it in 2019 to work on upgrading it. In March 2016, the groups signed a partnership with Wakaliwood Uganda to promote the Ugandan film industry. In 2017, the group's accountant was sentenced to five years in prison for embezzling 262 million shillings from the group from 2008 to 2013.

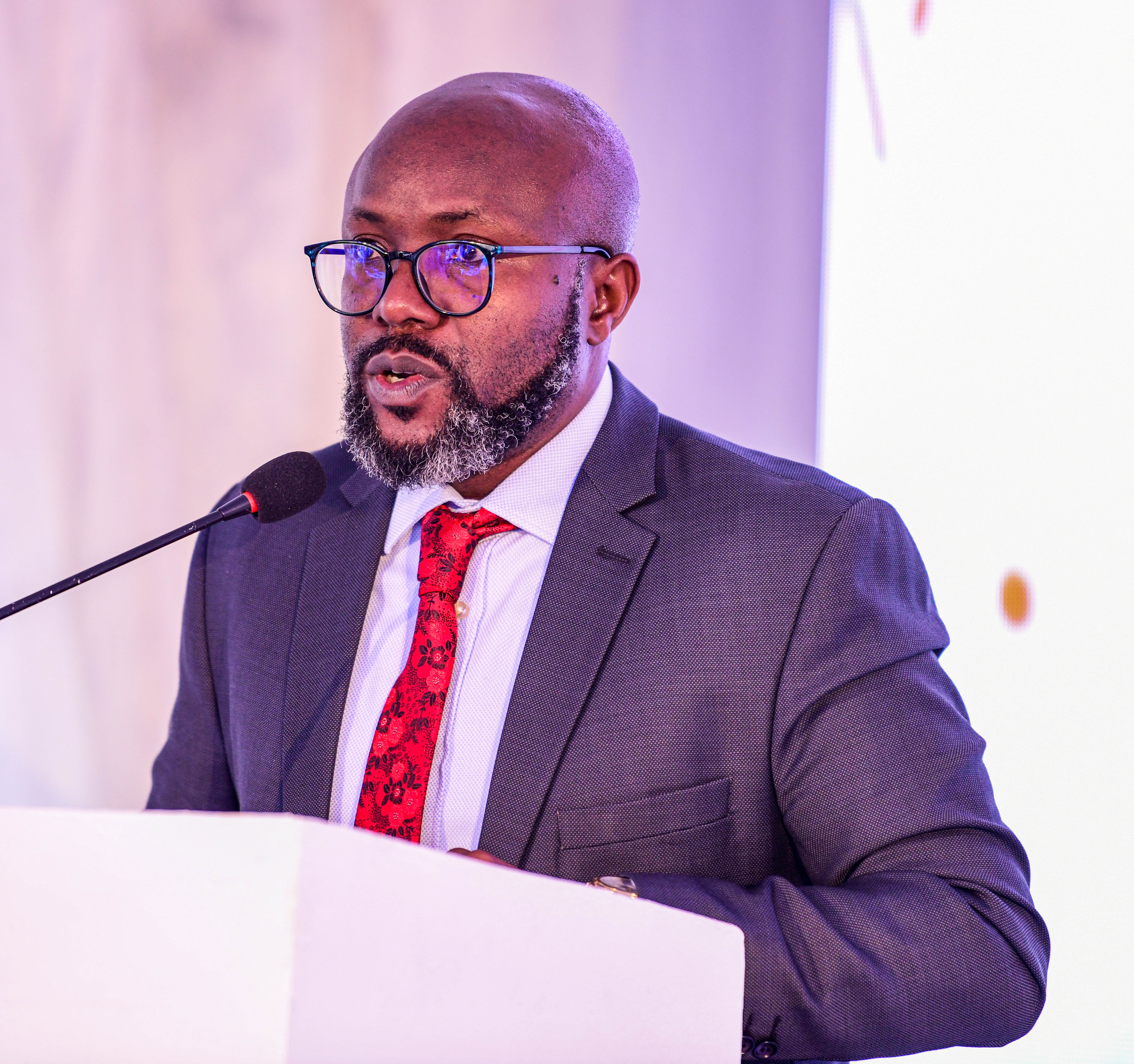
Don Wanyama, CEO Vision Group.

In May 2020, in the outburst of the COVID-19 pandemic in Uganda, the New Vision Group sent dozens of employees on forced leave without pay, twelve days after it had announced major salary cuts. Following this announcement, the group's accountant was found dead in her house.

== Overview ==
The group's holding company is The New Vision Printing & Publishing Company Limited (also referred to as the Vision Group). The Group owns other newspapers, radio stations and two television stations, as of January 2010. The stock of the holding company is traded on the Uganda Securities Exchange, under the symbol NVL.

The address of the Group's headquarters is 19-21 First Street, in the industrial area of Kampala.

== Subsidiary companies ==
The subsidiary companies of the Vision Group include:

1. New Vision (newspaper): published in English
2. Bukedde newspaper: published in Luganda
3. Orumuri newspaper: published in Runyankore/Rukiga (or Runyakitara)
4. Etop newspaper: published in Ateso
5. Rupiny newspaper: published in Luo
6. Premiership magazine: Soccer magazine covering English, African and Ugandan soccer news, published monthly in English.
7. City Beat magazine: Entertainment magazine aimed at the affluent 19 to 35 demographic age group, published monthly in English
8. Secondary Schools Directory: published annually in English
9. Bride & Groom magazine: Bridal magazine, published quarterly in English
10. New Vision Printing & Publishing Company Limited: Most newspapers in Uganda, Rwanda and Southern Sudan are printed by Vision Printing.
11. Vision Voice FM 94.8, (now X-FM): Based in Kampala. Broadcasts in English, covers a radius of 100 kilometres (62 mi).
12. Radio Bukedde FM 100.5: Based in Kampala. Broadcasts in Luganda
13. 100.2 Fm Radio West : Based in Mbarara. The dominant radio station in the Western Region of Uganda. Broadcasts in Runyankole/Rukiga, Runyoro/Rutoro and English.
14. Radio Rupiny FM 95.7: Based in Gulu. Broadcasts in Luo
15. Radio Etop FM 99.4: Based in Soroti. Broadcasts in Ateso
16. Arua One FM 88.7: Acquired in Arua during 2012. Broadcasts in Lugbara, Swahili and English.
17. Urban Television: Launched in October 2009. Transmits in English
18. Bukedde Television (BTV): Launched in October 2009. Transmits in Luganda
19. West Television (West TV): Operating in the Western parts of Uganda alongside Radio West. transmits in Runyankole/Rukiga, Runyoro/Rutoro and English.

== Ownership ==
The Vision Group is owned by the Ugandan government and by institutional and individual investors. The shares of the Group are traded on the Uganda Securities Exchange (USE), under he symbol: NVL. The table below summarizes the ownership structure of the Vision Group, as of 30 June 2016.

New Vision Group stock ownership
Rank	Name of owner	Percentage ownership
1	Ministry of State for Finance (Privatization)	26.67
2	Ministry of Finance, Planning and Economic Development	26.67
3	National Social Security Fund	19.61
4	National Social Security Fund: PineBridge	2.86
5	National Insurance Corporation	2.70
6	Bank of Uganda Staff Retirement Benefit Scheme: AIG	2.23
7	Bank of Uganda Staff Retirement Benefit Scheme: SIM	1.28
8	Insurance Company of East Africa Uganda Limited	0.74
9	Wazunula Samuel Mangaali	0.67
10	Makerere University Retirement Benefits Scheme	0.62
11	Other institutional & individual investors	15.97
	Total	100.0

== See also ==
- Nation Media Group
- Uganda Securities Exchange
