= Daily Monitor =

Independent daily newspaper in Uganda

Coordinates: 00°18′53″N 32°36′01″E

- Type: Daily newspaper
- Format: Berliner
- Owner: Nation Media Group (majority shareholder)
- Founders: Wafula Oguttu; Charles Onyango-Obbo; James Serugo; David Ouma Balikowa; Richard Tebere; Kevin O'Connor
- Publisher: Monitor Publications Limited
- Founded: July 24, 1992; 34 years ago
- Political alignment: Independent
- Language: English
- Headquarters: 29-35 Namuwongo Road (8th Street), Industrial Area; Kampala, Uganda
- Circulation: 16,169 (Q4 2019)
- Sister newspapers: Saturday Monitor, Sunday Monitor, Ennyanda
- OCLC number: 44216472
- Website: monitor.co.ug

Daily Monitor is an independent daily newspaper in Uganda. It launched in 1992 as The Monitor, establishing itself as a voice critical of the government. It is the second-largest English-language paper in Uganda, after the state-owned New Vision.

The paper is published by Monitor Publications Limited, which is majority-owned by the Nairobi-based Nation Media Group.

== History ==
The Monitor was launched as a weekly newspaper in 1992, and became a daily paper in 1996. In 2000 it was purchased by the Nation Media Group, the media division of the Aga Khan Fund for Economic Development, and was renamed Daily Monitor. The Fund announced in March 2026 that it had agreed to sell a controlling interest in Nation Media Group to Rostam Aziz's Tanzanian media company Taarifa Ltd.

Sister papers Saturday Monitor and Sunday Monitor were merged into a single Weekend Monitor in March 2026.

In the last quarter of 2019, the government-owned New Vision had a circulation of 23,636 copies, and the Daily Monitor had a circulation of 16,169 copies.

== Relationship with the Ugandan government ==
The newspaper and its journalists have repeatedly come into conflict with the Ugandan government.

In 1993, the Ugandan government banned all government agencies and ministries from advertising in The Monitor due to its perceived anti-government slant; the ban was rescinded in 1997.

In 2013, Ugandan police raided the newspaper's premises and shut down its operations. They were attempting to retrieve a letter, allegedly written by General David Sejusa, which had been published by the Daily Monitor and the Red Pepper. The letter raised concerns that those who opposed the rumored succession of President Museveni by his son Muhoozi Kainerugaba would be assassinated, and called for an investigation. Two radio stations associated with the Daily Monitor were also shut down. Journalists protesting the closure were beaten and tear-gassed. The newspaper resumed publication 11 days later and the radio stations went back on the air. The Ugandan Minister of Internal Affairs said that the Daily Monitor had agreed "not [to] publish or air stories that can generate tensions, ethnic hatred, cause insecurity or disturb law and order."

On 28 June 2026, army chief General Muhoozi Kainerugaba ordered the closure of the Daily Monitor and NTV Uganda, stating that he does not believe in a free press. Military personnel were deployed to the media groups' premises in Kampala.

== Related media outlets ==
The Daily Monitor is published by Monitor Publications Limited which also operates:

- Weekend Monitor, a merge of former papers Saturday Monitor and Sunday Monitor
- Ennyanda, a Luganda-language sports newspaper
- The EastAfrican, an English-language regional newspaper
- 93.3 KFM, an English-language radio station.
- 90.4 Dembe FM, a Luganda-language radio station.
- NTV, an English-language TV station

Daily Monitor publishes four regional editions: Africa, Uganda, Kenya, and Tanzania.

== Governance ==
As of mid-2024, leadership includes:

- Managing Director (CEO): Susan Nsibirwa, appointed in December 2023, becoming the first female head of the company.
- Managing Editor: Alex B. Atuhaire.
- Chairman of the Board: Samuel Sejjaaka, an academic and accountant.

== See also ==
- List of newspapers in Uganda
- Media in Uganda
- New Vision
