= Abortion in Uganda =

Abortion in Uganda is illegal unless performed by a licensed medical doctor in a situation where the woman's life is deemed to be at risk.

With women lacking access to safe and legal abortions, many of them turn to unsafe abortion practices, such as self-induced abortions. The Ugandan Ministry of Health in the Annual Health Sector Performance Report of 2017-2018 estimates that as of 2018, 5.3% of all maternal deaths result from abortion complications.

There are many legal and socioeconomic barriers to safe abortion and other family planning services, which often results in women using unsafe abortion methods and being deterred from seeking post-abortion medical care. Contraception is also not commonly used or easily accessible, which leads to Ugandan women having more children than they desire and increases the number of women resorting to unsafe abortions.

== Legal status of abortion ==
The Ugandan Constitution, in Article 22, item 2 states: "No person has the right to terminate the life of an unborn child except as may be authorised by law." Abortion is thus criminalized in Uganda unless it is done by a licensed and registered physician to save a woman's life or preserve the physical or mental health of the woman.

The Ugandan Ministry of Health's 2006 National Policy Guidelines and Service Standards for Sexual and Reproductive Health and Rights lays out a number of specific cases in which women have the right to seek an abortion, including rape, sexual violence or incest, or when the woman has pre-existing conditions such as HIV or cervical cancer. However, many healthcare providers remain unaware of the expansiveness of cases when abortion is allowed, resulting in legal abortion access still being difficult.

=== Laws on abortion ===
The Penal Code of 1950 states in Section 141, "Attempts to procure abortion":

Any person who, with intent to procure the miscarriage of a woman whether she is or is not with child, unlawfully administers to her or causes her to take any poison or other noxious thing, or uses any force of any kind, or uses any other means, commits a felony and is liable to imprisonment for fourteen years.

Section 142 deems an attempt to procure an unlawful abortion is punishable by imprisonment of seven years, and Section 143 states that anyone who aids a woman in performing an unlawful abortion can be imprisoned up to three years.

Nonetheless, Section 224 of the Code provides that a person is not criminally responsible for performing in good faith and with reasonable care and skill a surgical operation upon an unborn child for the preservation of the mother's life. In addition, Section 205 of the Code provides that no person shall be guilty of the offence of causing by willful act a child to die before it has an independent existence from its mother if the act was carried out in good faith for the purpose of preserving the mother's life.

=== Common law applications to Ugandan abortion law ===
Uganda, like a number of Commonwealth countries whose legal systems are based the English common law, follows the holding of the 1938 English Rex v Bourne decision in determining whether an abortion performed for health reasons is lawful. In the Bourne decision, a physician was acquitted of the offence of performing an abortion in the case of a 15 year-old girl who had been raped. The English Court ruled that the abortion was lawful because it had been performed to prevent the woman from becoming "a physical and mental wreck", thus setting a precedent for future abortion cases performed on the grounds of preserving the pregnant woman's physical and mental health.

== Government family planning ==
Unintended pregnancy is the most commonly cited reason that Ugandan women seek abortions. Thus, family planning programs are one way to lower the prevalence of illegal and/or unsafe abortions.

In 1988, the Ugandan government launched a comprehensive program in response to the country's high fertility and growth rates, which adversely affected per capita incomes and threatened the sustainability of social services. The major goal was to increase the contraceptive rate from 5% to 20% by 2000. For instance, the program made birth control accessible at clinics across the country operated by the Family Planning Association of Uganda. There was direct support provided in the government's policy on contraceptive use, and since 1995, 8% of married women aged 15 to 49 use contraception. The total fertility rate from 1995 to 2000 was 7.1, and the age specific fertility rate per 1,000 women aged 15 to 19 from 1995 to 2000 was 180. As of 2018, Uganda's total fertility rate stands at 5.5 children born per 1,000 women.

However, the demand for modern contraception—especially emergency contraception—is still unmet. Many Ugandan women cite a lack of access to family planning services or information as an explanation for not using contraceptives.

In 2014, the Ministry of Health launched the Family Planning Costed Implementation Plan (CIP) with a goal of increasing education and access to family planning for Ugandans. This commitment to increasing access to family planning has had tremendous impact, with a study revealing that the contraceptive prevalence rate has jumped to 39% as of 2016, while maternal mortality ratios have dropped by around 25%.

== Post-abortion care ==
Post-abortion care is not explicitly criminalized in Uganda. In fact, healthcare providers who treat women for bleeding, infections, or other post-abortion complications are forbidden by law from interrogating their patients or reporting them to the authorities. However, the police often does not care to differentiate between abortion and post-abortion care, leading to healthcare workers who provide either being punished just the same.

In Uganda, 89% of healthcare facilities with the capacity to provide post-abortion care actively treat post-abortion complications. However, according to Uganda's Minister of State for Health for General Duties, Sarah Opendi, an annual loss of 25 billion Uganda shillings occurred as a result of post-abortion care and treatment from unsafe abortions. Additionally, it was found that on average, three quarters of women who utilized unsafe abortion methods suffered from a loss of productivity and more than a third of women ended up worse off economically. As such, the argument for increasing access to safe abortion services and family planning services, which leads to reduced unsafe abortions and reduced need for costly post-abortion care, is often framed in economic terms.

== Discourse on abortion in Ugandan society ==
Abortion rights and anti-abortion movements exist in Uganda. As a Christian majority country, much of the discourse on abortion is shaped by strong conservative religious forces, which argue that abortion is akin to murder and which influence anti-abortion policies. Along these lines, the Pro-Life Organisation, a global Christian movement, has gained popularity in Uganda in recent years. In 2013, Pro-Life was joined by over 100 delegates from the U.S., United Kingdom, Uganda, and Spain in a three-day workshop that advocated against abortion.

At the same time, there have been increasing calls for the liberalization of Uganda's abortion laws. Abortion rights discourse often centers around human rights arguments, specifically that a pregnant woman has the right to health, life, and choice. Medical arguments also support this, saying that liberalized abortion laws and expanded access to safe abortions have led to improved women's health.

== See also ==
- Maternal health in Uganda
- Child health in Uganda
- Women in Uganda
