= Human rights in Uganda =

Human rights in Uganda have trended for the past decades towards increasing harassment of the opposition, cracking down on NGOs which work on election and term limits, corruption, land rights, environmental issues, women's, children and gay rights. In 2012, the Relief Web sponsored Humanitarian Profile – 2012 said Uganda made considerable developments. Since at least 2013, the annual Freedom in the World report by Freedom House has consistently classified Uganda as "Not Free". There are several areas of concern when it comes to human rights in Uganda, and the "Not Free" classification is due to both low political rights and civil liberties rankings.

== Law ==
In 1995, Uganda signed on to the International Covenant on Civil and Political Rights, which is part of the International Bill of Human Rights.

== Conflict in the north ==
Since various rebel groups started fighting the Government of President Yoweri Museveni in August 1986, about 2 million Ugandans were displaced and tens of thousands killed. Since 1987 the Lord's Resistance Army (LRA) kidnapped an estimated 67,000 children for use as child soldiers and slaves.

In 2006 a cessation of hostilities agreement was signed due to a successful campaign executed by the Uganda Peoples Defence Forces (UPDF) and put an end to the LRA violence in Uganda. The past conflict in the north of the country decimated the economy, retarded the development of affected areas and led to numerous gross human rights violations. These violations centered upon the poor emergency provision provided to Internally Displaced Persons fleeing their homes to avoid LRA. In the twelve years since the signing of hostilities agreement many of those displaced persons have returned to their homes and a rehabilitation and redevelopment program is underway. It has been acknowledged by both the Ugandan Government and the United Nations that this is a work in progress and that considerable improvements must be made. In this regard a rehabilitation program has been launched

By 02-04-2021 Dominic Ongwen, a former child soldier and one of the leaders of the LRA was convicted by the International Criminal Court(ICC) for a wide range of sexual and Gender-based crimes, 70 crimes in number committed between 1 July 2002 and 31 December 2005 in Northern Uganda.

== Repression against environmental activists ==
In 2010, community opposition against plans to build the Uganda Oil Refinery led to repression against environmental activists.

In 2016, the NGO Act created obstacles for people to organize themselves in non-governmental organizations.

In August 2021, Uganda arbitrarily suspended the activities of 54 NGOs.

In 2022, the UN Special Rapporteur on the situation of human rights defenders; Special Rapporteur on the issue of human rights obligations relating to the enjoyment of a safe, clean, healthy and sustainable environment; Special Rapporteur on the promotion and protection of the right to freedom of opinion and expression and Special Rapporteur on the rights to freedom of peaceful assembly and of association on human rights confronted the government of Uganda with its arrest of 8 members of AFIEGO and spoke to the criminalization and intimidation of NGOs working on oil and gas issues.

== Political freedom ==
In April 2005, two opposition Member of Parliament were arrested on what were believed to be politically motivated charges. Ronald Reagan Okumu and Michael Nyeko Ocula are from the Forum for Democratic Change (FDC), the movement believed to pose the greatest threat to the reelection of President Yoweri Museveni in 2006.

The most prominent opposition to President Museveni, Kizza Besigye has run for office three times and been defeated each time. On the occasion of his last defeat (the 2011 elections) Besigye called for all his FDC party members to boycott the parliament and not take up their seats as elected. As party members refused to do this Besigye stood down as party leader. Besigye has identified several incidents whereby his political freedom was violated. Notably in 2011 he was placed under preventative arrest, however he was immediately released as this arrest was deemed unlawful by the Ugandan Courts.

After a heavily contested 2016 election campaign, Museveni was re-elected into office. While his re-election was independently verified by Amnesty International, Amnesty did express concerns over alleged election violence and freedom of press restrictions. though

In 2020, dozens of people were killed by security forces like police and other security organs in the country in different parts in the context of electoral campaigns ahead of the 2021 general elections. Two days after the elections, on 16 January 2021, Meseveni who has been president for 35 years was declared presidential winner by the Electoral Commission which stated that he had 58.6% of the total votes, and that Robert Kyagulanyi, head of National Unity Platform (NUP) had 34.8% of the total votes. Kyagulanyi filed a legal challenge with the supreme court but on 22 February, withdrew claiming that the judges were biased.

== Freedom of the press ==
In late 2002, the independent Monitor newspaper was temporarily closed by the army and police. Journalists from the paper continued to come under attack in 2004, two of whom were publicly denounced as "rebel collaborators" by a spokesman for the UPDF.

In February 2004, the Supreme Court ruled the offence of "publication of false news" to be void and unconstitutional.

In 2005, Uganda was rated as the 13th most free press of 48 countries in Sub-Saharan Africa In 2010, Uganda was rated the 15th most free press of 48 countries.

On the 24th day of January 2012 Issac Kasamani, a photo journalist alleged in a newspaper report that he had been shot at by a police officer whilst covering an opposition rally. An independent investigation into this incident was immediately ordered and an independent report completed by a foreign national concluded that no live ammunition was fired on the date in question.

Upon release of this report Ugandan Minister Hon. James Baba expressed concern over the standards of reporting surrounding the incident and announced his intention to look closely at media regulation. This is of international concern.

In November 2012, John Ssegawa, co-director of the critical State of the Nation play reported that Uganda's Media Council had decided to ban further showings. Ssegawa said the theatre production company would continue to stage the production and defy the ban.

== Persecution of homosexuals ==
In October 2009, a bill was tabled in the Ugandan Parliament entitled "Anti-Homosexuality Bill 2009" calling for harsher penalties for homosexuals, up to and including death penalty. As originally drafted and tabled this bill also requires that any citizen who suspects another person of being homosexual, is required to report the homosexual to police, or they too may receive a fine or time in prison. The proposed bill goes so far as to forbid landlords from renting to a known homosexual, and would ban any public discussion of homosexuality.

The international community was greatly opposed to the introduction of this bill and expressed concerns about the fact that it may become law, indeed U.S. President Barack Obama called it 'odious'. As a result of mounting international pressure the bill never proceeded past committee stage.

On 7 March 2012 backbench MP David Bahati reintroduced the bill to much controversy. He was however at pains to point out that the provision for death penalty had been decided upon as unnecessary and removed from the bill at committee stage in the 8th parliament. As such, the bill as introduced into the 9th Parliament, had no provision for the death penalty.

This bill remains highly criticised and controversial. It has again been met with widespread condemnation. The Ugandan government in replying to this condemnation issued a statement citing the fact that the bill was a private members bill and that it did not have the support of the government.

On 24 February 2014 President Yoweri Museveni signed the '"Anti Homosexuality Bill" into law. The following day the tabloid "Red Pepper" published a list of 200 allegedly gay men.

Following the tightening of the bill several western industrial nations, among others Sweden, the United States and the Netherlands have suspended their aid to Uganda. The World Bank postponed a $90 million loan to Uganda's health system over the law.

== Abuses by Ugandan security forces ==
"On 14 June [2003] Violent Crime Crack Unit Green officers arrested Nsangi Murisidi, aged 29, on suspicion that he had facilitated friends to commit robbery and for alleged possession of a gun. Relatives tried in vain to visit him in detention. On 18 June the lawyer representing the family received confirmation of his death in custody while at the VCCU headquarters at Kireka, a suburb of Kampala. The death certificate established the cause of death as extensive loss of fluid and blood, severe bleeding in the brain and extensive deep burns on the buttocks. The body also bore 14 deep wounds. In October the Minister of Internal Affairs informed AI that an inquiry had been ordered, but no progress was subsequently reported."

In 2020, security forces including police, army (UPDF) and the Local Defense Forces used extensive, unnecessary and at some points lethal force to enforce social distancing and other measures that were laid out to combat COVID-19 and not less than 66 people were killed from March 2020 onwards and around 12 killed because of violating lockdown measures.

On 28 Dec 2021, a PEN Pinter Prize International Writer award winning novelist Kakwenza Rukirabashaija was arrested over allegations of being a critic of President Yoweri Museveni and his son. He is said to have been tortured in custody by security forces.

In April 2025, allegations of human rights violations by Ugandan security forces intensified following the abduction of Eddie Mutwe, chief bodyguard to opposition leader Bobi Wine. Mutwe was reportedly seized near Kampala on 27 April by unidentified armed men, an incident the National Unity Platform (NUP) characterized as a politically motivated abduction. Days later, General Muhoozi Kainerugaba, military chief and son of President Yoweri Museveni, claimed responsibility on social media, stating that Mutwe had been captured "like a grasshopper" and was being held in his basement. Kainerugaba’s public statements included threats of further violence against opposition figures and references to mistreatment, including beating and forcibly shaving Mutwe. These remarks sparked widespread condemnation, with the Uganda Law Society describing the abduction as part of a broader campaign to suppress dissent. The Uganda Human Rights Commission issued a release order for Mutwe on 2 May 2025, and the incident drew renewed international scrutiny over the state’s use of force against political opponents ahead of the general elections scheduled for January 2026.

== Women's rights ==
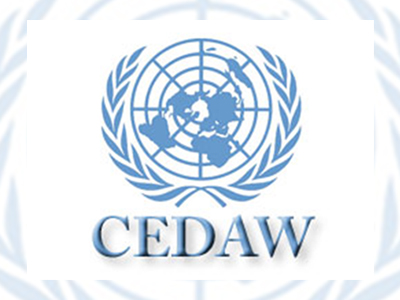
The Convention on the Elimination of All Forms of Discrimination Against Women (CEDAW)

Ugandan officials ratified the Convention on the Elimination of All Forms of Discrimination Against Women (CEDAW) on July 22, 1985. Countries that chose to ratify CEDAW had one year to submit a formal report to the convention and are required to file one every four years after the first report. The Ugandan government, however, submitted its formal CEDAW report five years after ratification, in 1990. CEDAW mandates that signatories abolish discrimination against women and implement policies that further women's equal rights. Article 21 of the Constitution of Uganda, follows CEDAW policies, securing the right to equality for all people in the political, economic, and social spheres of Uganda. The article further asserts that no person shall experience discrimination because of their sex, race, ethnicity, disability, tribe, religion, socio-economic standing, or political affiliation.

According to the Inter-Parliamentary Union, as of 2017, Uganda had not reported its CEDAW implementation status since 2010. Uganda has also not ratified the optional Convention protocol. This optional protocol enables CEDAW committees to receive and process complaints made by signatory constituents about violations of rights guaranteed by CEDAW. That being said, the Varieties of Democracy public survey data regarding women's civil liberties - an aggregation of the data of freedom of domestic movement, from forced labor, of property rights, and access to justice - shows that between the years 1986 and 2019, the Uganda public believed the majority of women in the country receive a medium to high level of these liberties.

=== Property rights ===
Women in Uganda have been champions of equal property rights for women, pastoralists, and various other marginalized groups. Women have also actively participated in organizations (i.e. The Uganda Land Alliance, The Uganda Association of Women Lawyers) who are actively fighting for marginalized communities' rights and who are questioning Ugandan customary land tenure as well.

Customary rules hold much significance in Ugandan society, especially in regard to land tenure and property rights.

Uganda has experienced several land reforms over the years, with a significant reform being the 1998 Land Act. Under the Land Act, women are granted equal rights to land in Uganda, allowing them to own land primarily through their fathers, brothers, or husbands. The Land Act prohibits all decisions related to property that result in the refusal of land rights to women. Furthermore, the 1995 Constitution of Uganda also prohibits gender-based discrimination, granting men and women equal rights. Although the Land Act and various land-rights systems grant women land ownership, there is evidence that these measures do not always properly secure women's property rights in terms of access and management of the land. One reason for this being customary law in Uganda and its tendency to award women fewer rights to property than men.

During the 1998 Land Act creation, it was proposed that the government would mandate joint ownership of the land by spouses, but the proposal was not enacted. This act has resulted in the affordance of equal rights to land not necessitating legal co-ownership of the property. For example, reports consider married couples to be co-owners of the land, solely the men of the households are predominantly listed in the ownership documents. The official name, or title, on the ownership documents affects women's true land rights. The Land Act also does not consider customary law procedures, especially in regard to widows' acquisition of their late husband's land. That is to say, women typically do not inherit land from their husband as it is a tradition for men to leave their land to their tribe, not their widow. This trend is a result of attempts to ensure that land remains within the tribe, without risking that women may sell the land to individuals outside of the tribe. Hence, women may have co-ownership of land with her husband, but without secure property rights, a widow may be denied the land of her late-husband.

Women have enacted strategies in order to make claims on land and to legally own property themselves, despite some customary laws awarding them fewer property rights. In fact, women are increasingly using formal legal systems, like magistrate courts, to gain formal access to land. Women have also achieved ownership of land through purchasing it themselves, which is a way to circumnavigate co-ownership issues. According to Varieties of Democracy, public opinion surveys show that Ugandans believe that since 1994, several women have private property rights with a minority of the female population enjoying little to no property rights. Additionally, public opinion data illustrates that between the years 1995 and 2017, at least half of the women have most of the available property rights in the country.

=== Rights in marriage ===
The Constitution of Uganda provides clarity on the issue of family rights and issues fourteen recommendations on these rights in its text. Under the Constitution of Uganda, the legal marriage age for both men and women is eighteen years old. However, there is strong evidence of girls in Uganda quitting school to become a child bride. According to the U.S. Embassy in Uganda, in 2017, Uganda faced one of the highest rates of early marriage globally. It was reported that 40% of girls in Uganda married prior to turning eighteen. In 2017, 10% of Ugandan girls were married before the age of fifteen.

During the creation of the Ugandan Constitution, the cultural practice of bride price was debated, with the Constituent Assembly ruling against its abolition. Bride price is legal in Uganda and is the traditional act of the groom paying for his bride with money, cattle, or goods. In 2007, a non-governmental organization brought the issue of bride price to the Constitutional Court citing concerns about the constitutionality of the custom, but the court held the legality of the practice. In 2015, though, the Ugandan Supreme Court ruled it illegal for a groom to ask for a refund of the bride price in the case of the dissolution of marriage.

The Constitution further states that men and women are entitled to equal rights at all stages of the marriage, even during the dissolution of the marriage. Section 4 of the Divorce act stated that in order to successfully apply for the dissolution of a marriage through the courts, a husband had to demonstrate one ground (i.e. adultery) to the court. In order to petition for divorce, a wife has to prove at least two circumstances (i.e. change of religious affiliation, taking another wife, incestuous or bigamous adultery) to the court. However, the Association of Women Lawyers took the case to court, petitioning that Section 4 was unconstitutional on the basis on discrimination of sex. The Constitutional Court ruled in favor of the Association of Women Lawyers, but the legislature in Uganda has not yet amended the Constitution to adhere to the court's ruling.

=== Sexual violence ===
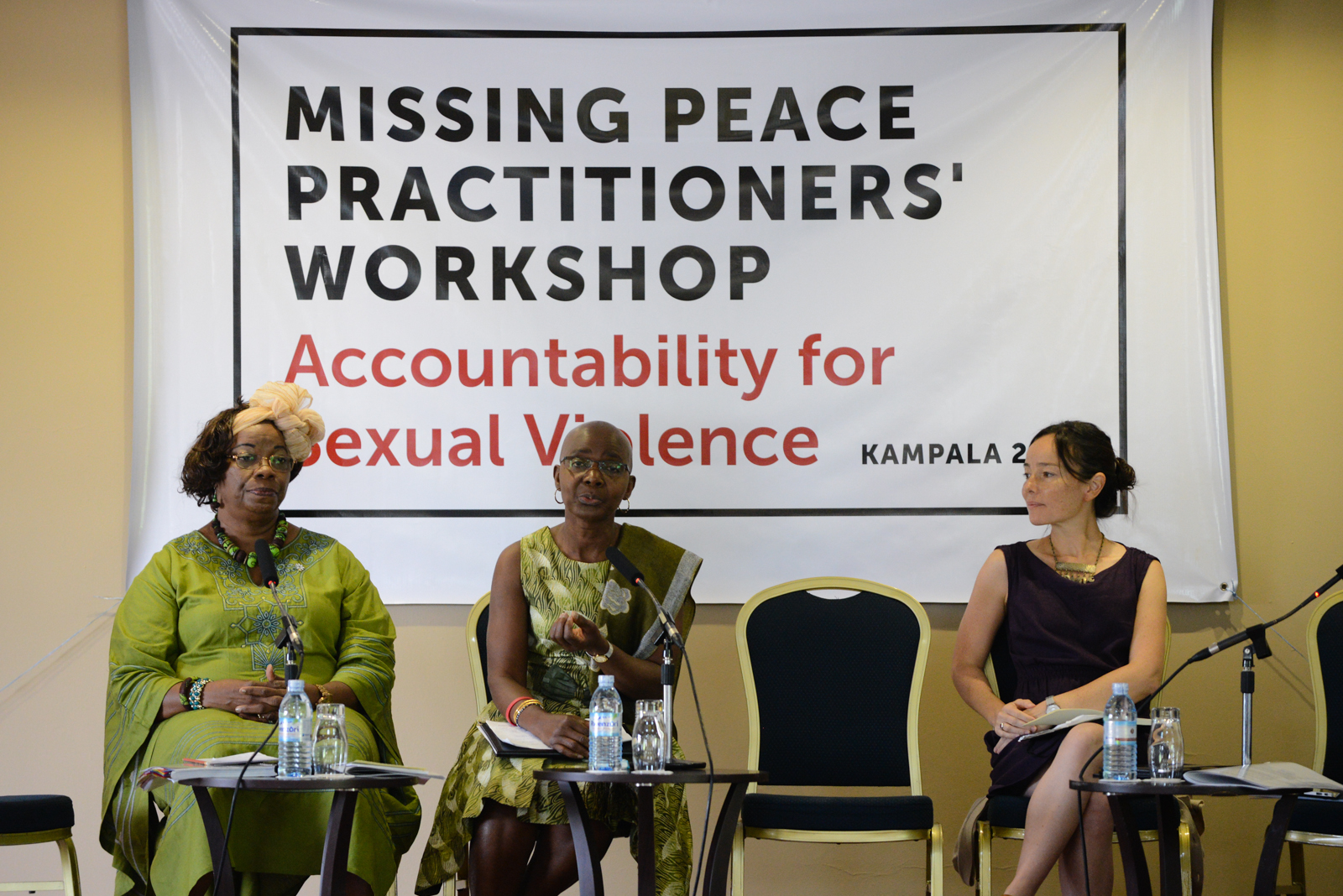
In August 2015, the leaders of Kenya, Liberia, Sierra Leone, Uganda, eastern Democratic Republic of the Congo, and South Sudan met in Kampala, Uganda to discuss how they document and prosecute sexual violence in their respective countries.

The history of sexual violence in Northern Uganda sees individuals experiencing conflict-period sexual violence between the years 1986–2006. It has been reported that both sides of the insurgency, the Lord's Resistance Army (LRA) and the Uganda People's Defense Force (UPDF), committed acts of sexual and gender based violence. In the displacement camps, there was a high number of gender-based violent acts (i.e. rape, physical assault) performed by LRA and UPDF soldiers but also by family members and acquaintances in the camps as well. During this insurgency period, women are thought to have participated in sexual acts with LRA and UPDF soldiers as a survival technique. Men experiencing conflict-period sexual violence was widespread throughout these years. It was a common military warfare strategy used by the state's soldiers against the Acholi people. In fact, sexual violence against men is often used as a tactic to emasculate or feminize the victims.

Uganda has implemented laws and policies in an attempt to protect the victims and survivors of sexual violence. However, domestic violence in the country is prevalent and on the rise. The 2016 Uganda Police Force's crime report noted that cases investigating gender-based violence in the country rose by 4% from the previous year. According to the 2018 UN Children's Fund report, 35% of Ugandan women aged 18–24 experienced sexual violence before the age of eighteen. There are also a plethora of cases of sexual violence in the country go unreported.

Several laws and policies (i.e. the Penal Code Act 2007, Domestic Violence Act 2010, Sexual Offense Bill, Marriage Bill) in Uganda dealing with violence against women do not include many aspects of sexual violence, such as marital rape or cohabiting partners. For instance, the Domestic Violence Act considers legalized marriage but does not address violence among cohabiting couples.

That being said, Uganda has seen some successes in regard to violence against women. Between the years 2011 and 2017, domestic violence deaths decreased by 54%, according to police crime reports. In 2016, a policy called the National Gender Based Violence (GBV) was implemented. This policy details the responsibilities of the various government sectors in stopping and responding to sexual violence. A program through GBV has partnered with United Nations members to improve gender-based violence in the regions of Busoga and Karamoja.

== Child labor ==
According to the U.S. Department of Labor, Uganda has made significant advancement in eliminating the worst forms of child labor in 2013. However, underage children continue to engage in strenuous activities mostly in the agricultural sector and in commercial sexual exploitation. The Department's report Findings on the Worst Forms of Child Labor indicates that 30% of children aged 5 to 14 are working children and that 95% of them work in the agricultural sector, picking coffee and tea, growing rice, herding cattle and fishing among other activities.

Instances of child labor have also been observed in the mining industry (brick making and charcoal production) and in the services sector. Categorical forms of child labor in Uganda included sexual and military exploitation. In December 2014, the department issued a List of Goods Produced by Child Labor or Forced Labor where 10 goods were listed under the country of Uganda. These included bricks, cattle, charcoal, coffee, fish, rice, sugarcane, tea and tobacco.

In 2020, in Kampala, the impact caused by COVID-19 and the closure of schools pushed many children into exploitive child labor which is also fueled by inadequate government assistance.

== Historical rankings ==
The following is a chart of Uganda's ratings since 1972 in the Freedom in the World reports, published annually by Freedom House. (1 is best, 7 is worst).

Year	Political Rights	Civil Liberties	Status	President^{1}
1972	7	7	Not Free	Idi Amin^{2}
1973	7	7	Not Free	Idi Amin
1974	7	7	Not Free	Idi Amin
1975	7	7	Not Free	Idi Amin
1976	7	7	Not Free	Idi Amin
1977	7	7	Not Free	Idi Amin
1978	7	7	Not Free	Idi Amin
1979	6	6	Not Free	Idi Amin
1980	4	4	Partly Free	Godfrey Binaisa
1981	5	5	Partly Free	Milton Obote
1982	5	5	Partly Free	Milton Obote
1983	4	5	Partly Free	Milton Obote
1984	4	5	Partly Free	Milton Obote
1985	5	4	Partly Free	Milton Obote
1986	5	4	Partly Free	Tito Okello
1987	5	4	Partly Free	Yoweri Museveni
1988	5	5	Partly Free	Yoweri Museveni
1989	6	4	Partly Free	Yoweri Museveni
1990	6	5	Partly Free	Yoweri Museveni
1991	6	6	Not Free	Yoweri Museveni
1992	6	5	Not Free	Yoweri Museveni
1993	6	5	Not Free	Yoweri Museveni
1994	5	5	Partly Free	Yoweri Museveni
1995	5	4	Partly Free	Yoweri Museveni
1996	4	4	Partly Free	Yoweri Museveni
1997	4	4	Partly Free	Yoweri Museveni
1998	4	4	Partly Free	Yoweri Museveni
1999	5	5	Partly Free	Yoweri Museveni
2000	6	5	Partly Free	Yoweri Museveni
2001	6	5	Partly Free	Yoweri Museveni
2002	6	4	Partly Free	Yoweri Museveni
2003	5	4	Partly Free	Yoweri Museveni
2004	5	4	Partly Free	Yoweri Museveni
2005	5	4	Partly Free	Yoweri Museveni
2006	5	4	Partly Free	Yoweri Museveni
2007	5	4	Partly Free	Yoweri Museveni
2008	5	4	Partly Free	Yoweri Museveni
2009	5	4	Partly Free	Yoweri Museveni
2010	5	4	Partly Free	Yoweri Museveni
2011	5	4	Partly Free	Yoweri Museveni
2012	5	4	Partly Free	Yoweri Museveni
2013	6	4	Partly Free	Yoweri Museveni
2014	6	5	Not Free	Yoweri Museveni
2015	6	5	Not Free	Yoweri Museveni
2016	6	5	Not Free	Yoweri Museveni
2017	6	4	Partly Free	Yoweri Museveni
2018	6	5	Not Free	Yoweri Museveni
2019	6	5	Not Free	Yoweri Museveni
2020	6	5	Not Free	Yoweri Museveni
2021	6	5	Not Free	Yoweri Museveni
2022	6	5	Not Free	Yoweri Museveni

== See also ==
- Human trafficking in Uganda
- Internet censorship and surveillance in Uganda
- Politics of Uganda
- Education in Uganda
- List of massacres in Uganda

== Notes ==
1.As of January 1.
2.From 1977 to 1979, Amin titled himself as "His Excellency, President for Life, Field Marshal Al Hadji Doctor Idi Amin Dada, VC, DSO, MC, Lord of All the Beasts of the Earth and Fishes of the Seas and Conqueror of the British Empire in Africa in General and Uganda in Particular".
