= Kiiza =

Kiiza is both a given name and a surname. Notable people with the name include:

- Kiiza Eron (born 1983), Ugandan poet
- Ali Kiiza, Ugandan general
- Ernest Kiiza, Ugandan politician
- Hamis Kiiza (born 1990), Ugandan footballer
- Lawrence Kiiza, Ugandan politician
- Winifred Kiiza (born 1972), Ugandan teacher
- Yabezi Kiiza (1938–2016), Ugandan politician
- Basil Kiiza Bataringaya (1927–1972), Ugandan politician
