= Keith Kalyegira =

- Born: Keith Kalyegira; 1971 (age 54–55); Uganda
- Education: Makerere University (Bachelor of Commerce); University of Cape Town (Master of Business Administration); Institute of Chartered Secretaries and Administrators (Member of the ICSA)
- Occupations: Accountant and administrator
- Years active: 1986 - present
- Title: chief executive officer CMA of Uganda

Keith Kalyegira is an accountant, administrator and civil servant in Uganda. He is the former chief executive officer of the Capital Markets Authority of Uganda. He was appointed to that position in November 2013, replacing Japheth Katto.

== Background and education ==
He was born in Uganda circa 1971. He graduated from Makerere University in 1993 with a Bachelor of Commerce degree. His Master of Business Administration was obtained from the University of Cape Town in 2002. He is a member of the Institute of Chartered Secretaries and Administrators, a qualification that he obtained in 1997.

== Career ==
He formerly served as a member of the governing council of the Uganda Securities Exchange. He also has served as the head of the Parastatal Monitoring Unit and Privatisation Utility Sector Reform Project under the Ministry of Finance. Before that, he served as an investment officer at the National Social Security Fund (Uganda). Before that, he served with Shell in their commercial aviation division in their southern and eastern Africa markets.
