= Chris George =

Chris or Christopher George may refer to:

- Christopher George (1931–1983), American television and film actor
- Christopher Paul George (born 1980), American entrepreneur
- Christopher George (judoka) (born 1983), Trinidad and Tobago judoka
- Chris George (left-handed pitcher), current Major League Baseball pitcher in the Baltimore Orioles organization
- Chris George (right-handed pitcher), former Major League Baseball pitcher for the Milwaukee Brewers
- Christopher George (rower), British lightweight rower
- Christopher George (priest) (1891–1977), Archdeacon of Suffolk
- Christopher George Frederick Frampton Melmoth, Ugandan politician

== See also ==
- Christopher St George, Irish Member of Parliament
- George Christopher (disambiguation)
- George (surname)
