= Purity Wako =

Ugandan life coach

Purity Kategaya Wako
- Born: Ibanda, Uganda
- Occupations: Transformational Coach, Nutritionist, Activist
- Known for: CEO of KweraBITS, BBC 100 Women 2019
- Spouse: Joseph Elisha Wako
- Children: 3

Purity Kategaya Wako is a Ugandan transformational coach, nutritionist and activist.

== Biography ==
She is member of International coach federation and the C.E.O of KweraBits. She also appeared on the list of BBC 100 influential women in the world 2019. She is married to Joseph Elisha Wako and is a mother of three. Purity was born in Ibanda and currently lives in Kampala.

As a modern senga, she advises women on relationships, but expands the role, wanting African women to have equal rights in marriage. She founded her own company, KweraBITS for women's health, beauty and counselling, in 2013 and she has transformed thousands of lives especially women.

In 2019, she was listed among the BBC's 100 Women, a list of 100 inspiring and influential women.

== See also ==
- Women in Uganda
