= Kayinga Muddu Yisito =

Ugandan activist

- Citizenship: Ugandan
- Occupations: Social Entrepreneur, Community Rights Activist and Human Rights Activist
- Employer(s): Community Transformation Foundation Network, Network of African Youth for Development, A Better Community For All, Youngsters Revolution
- Organization: Youngsters Revolution
- Notable work: Spear headed a campaign for the people who were and are affected by the East African Crude Oil Pipeline (EACOP) to get compensated
- Awards: Nominated for 2022 EU Human Rights Defenders Award

Kayinga Muddu Yisito is a Ugandan social entrepreneur, community rights activist and human rights advocate. He is the current executive director of COTFONE (Community Transformation Foundation Network), Country Coordinator NAYD (Network of African Youth for Development) and Coordinator for Africa ABC4All (A Better Community For All, Founder & Coordinator YR (Youngsters Revolution). Kayinga was nominated and shortlisted under the 2022 EU Human Rights Defenders Award for being instrumental in raising the voices of households in greater Masaka regions that will be affected by the development of the East African Crude Oil Pipeline-EACOP.

== Career ==
Kayinga is the representative for Civil Society Organization (CSOs ) in Lwengo District, Uganda and Country Ambassador Millennium Candle Campaign (MCC ) for raising awareness about “United Nations’ Millennium Development Goals,2015”. Kayinga also works as a development consultant specializing in sustainable rural development with Community Welfare Services (COWESER-Uganda) and Children's Sure House (CSH).

Kayinji is the coordinator for Community Transformation Network (COTFONE), an Organization helping the people who were and are affected by the East African Crude Oil Pipeline (EACOP) to get compensated.

== Nominations and awards ==
Nominated for 2022 EU Human Rights Defenders Award.

== See also ==
- Primah Kwagala
- Kiiza Eron
