= Lawrence Sebalu =

Ugandan politician

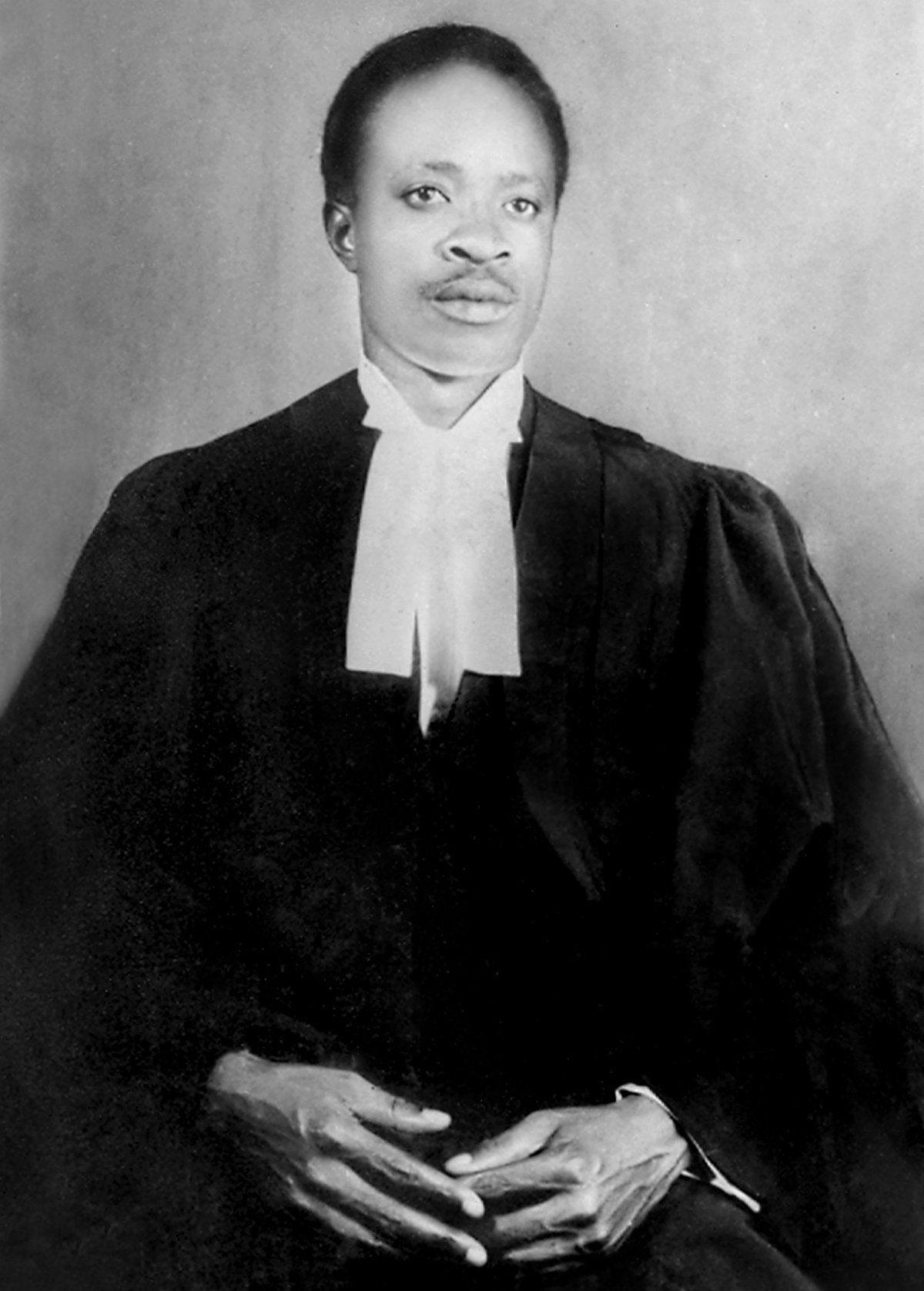
- Enrollment Dehli Feb 1959

Minister of Finance, Planning, and Economic Development
- In office May 1980
- President: Paulo Muwanga
- Preceded by: Jack Sentongo
- Succeeded by: Milton Obote
- In office 1961–1962
- President: Benedicto Kiwanuka
- Preceded by: Christopher George Frederick Frampton Melmoth

Personal details
- Born: 23 May 1931
- Died: 4 August 1987 (aged 57)
- Party: Democratic Party

Lawrence Sebalu (23 May1931 to 4 August 1987) was a Ugandan lawyer, economist, businessman and politician who served as minister of finance, planning, and economic development from 1961 until 1962 and in May 1980. During his first tenure, he was an advocate for independence from the United Kingdom and argued for the diversification of Uganda's agriculture-based economy..

== Biography ==
Early Life

Lawrence Kyompitira Mayanja (LKM) Sebalu was born on 23 May1931 to Isaaka Kyompitira a cattle trader and Emirina Namusisi of Namere Village Kyampisi Sub County, Mukono District. Part of his family moved to the nearby Wabikookooma village in Nabbaale Sub County where he inherited land as a toddler and started school at St.Joseph's Mixed Primary Naggalama. He later moved to St Peter's Nsambya before joining Namilyango College for high school education.

Higher Education

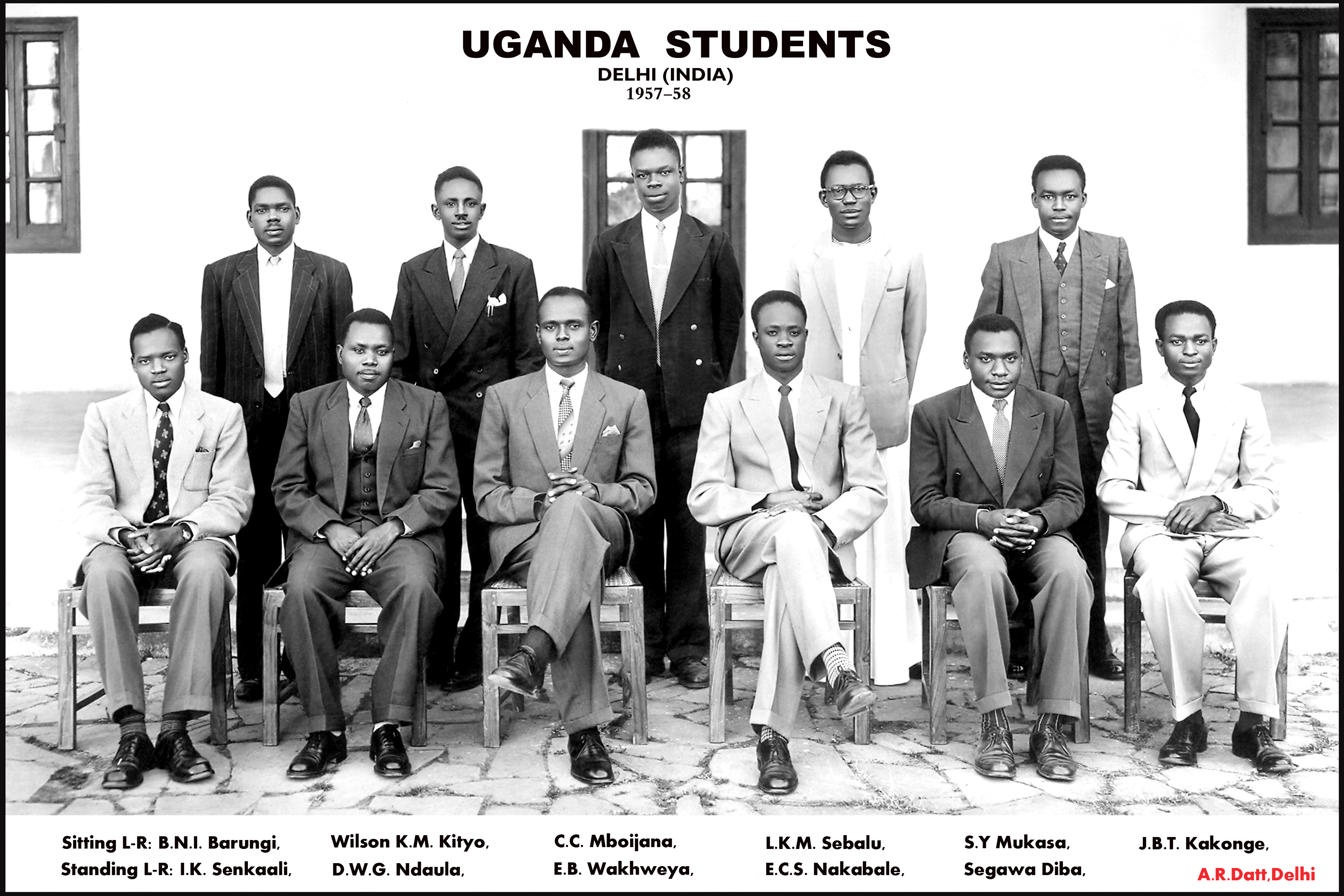

After High school he was awarded a scholarship by The Cabana Education fund to St. Xavier's College Calcutta a Jesuit constituent College of The University of Calcutta where 1953 he was admitted to the Honors Degree Program in Economics on completion of a matriculation. His scholarship was extended after graduation enabling him to move to The University of Delhi for postgraduate studies, he was enrolled as an advocate of the High Court of Delhi in February 1959 on completion of his LL.B. He attended universities in India where he received degrees in law and economics.

After 6 straight years in India he immediately returned to Uganda to join Hunter and Greig Advocates where he worked for a short while before teaming up with Benedicto Kiwanuka under Kiwanuka & Sebalu Advocates on Salisbury (now Nkrumah) road. He married Francis Nakachwa Sebalu on 10 September 1960.He worked as a lawyer and was member of the Democratic Party. He firmly believed that the principles of Truth, Justice and free speech were critical for the sprouting countries in Harold Wilson's "wind of change" and freely aired his personal views on political, social and economic matters to obtain valued contrary opinions.

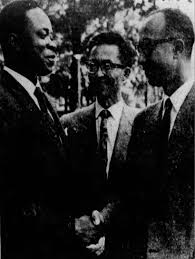
Sebalu (left) meeting with an Egyptian student at Vanderbilt University, 1961

From 1961 until 1962, Sebalu served as the first minister of finance, planning, and economic development for the British-controlled Protectorate of Uganda in the government of President Benedicto Kiwanuka. An advocate for full independence through peaceful methods, he argued that an independent Uganda should focus on developing hydroelectric power and public education. He also argued the country's agricultural sector should move away from coffee and cotton production – which accounted for 80% of Uganda's exports – and towards smaller plants. In September 1961, the American International Cooperation Administration sponsored a visit by Sebalu to speak at universities in the United States. On 1 March 1962, Sebalu announced that he had discovered an alleged plot by the Uganda People's Congress (UPC) to overthrow the constitution within three years of independence.

He later established and successfully run a law firm at City house on Alidina Visrum (now Luwum) street through the mid sixties and seventies although the rule of law was disrupted by the coup.. His exposure to the Jesuit Ignitian spirituality discipline as a lay person at St. Xavier's influenced his approach to life as a young adult, he was particularly keen on self-assessment of each day's progress against set targets in his early working years. In that regard he often demanded results from those under his pupilage and household. As an economist he had an interest and contributed to Uganda's rural development efforts. Together with Monsignor Emmanuel Kibirige and others he devoted time to the planning and preparation of what evolved into Centenary Bank. He was an ardent businessman and avid rancher whose interests extended out of Uganda especially with the repercussions of the economic war on the country.

In late 1972, during the rule of Idi Amin, Sebalu disappeared after being arrested by the military police, but was not killed. In May 1980, after the fall of Amin's government, Sebalu briefly served again as Uganda's finance minister in the interim government of Paulo Muwanga, and was succeeded in that position by Milton Obote. During this period, he was the only high-ranking member of the Democratic Party to support the UPC in a joint statement against that year's elections, which they argued would turn Uganda into a one-party state under the control of the Uganda National Liberation Front.

Lawrence Sebalu died of kidney failure on 4 August 1987 at the age of 57 .
