= Maternal health in Uganda =

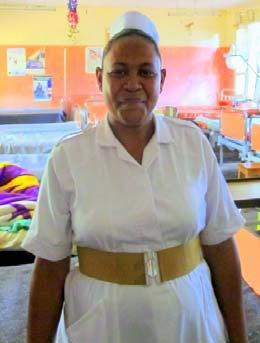
A maternal health nurse in Karamoja

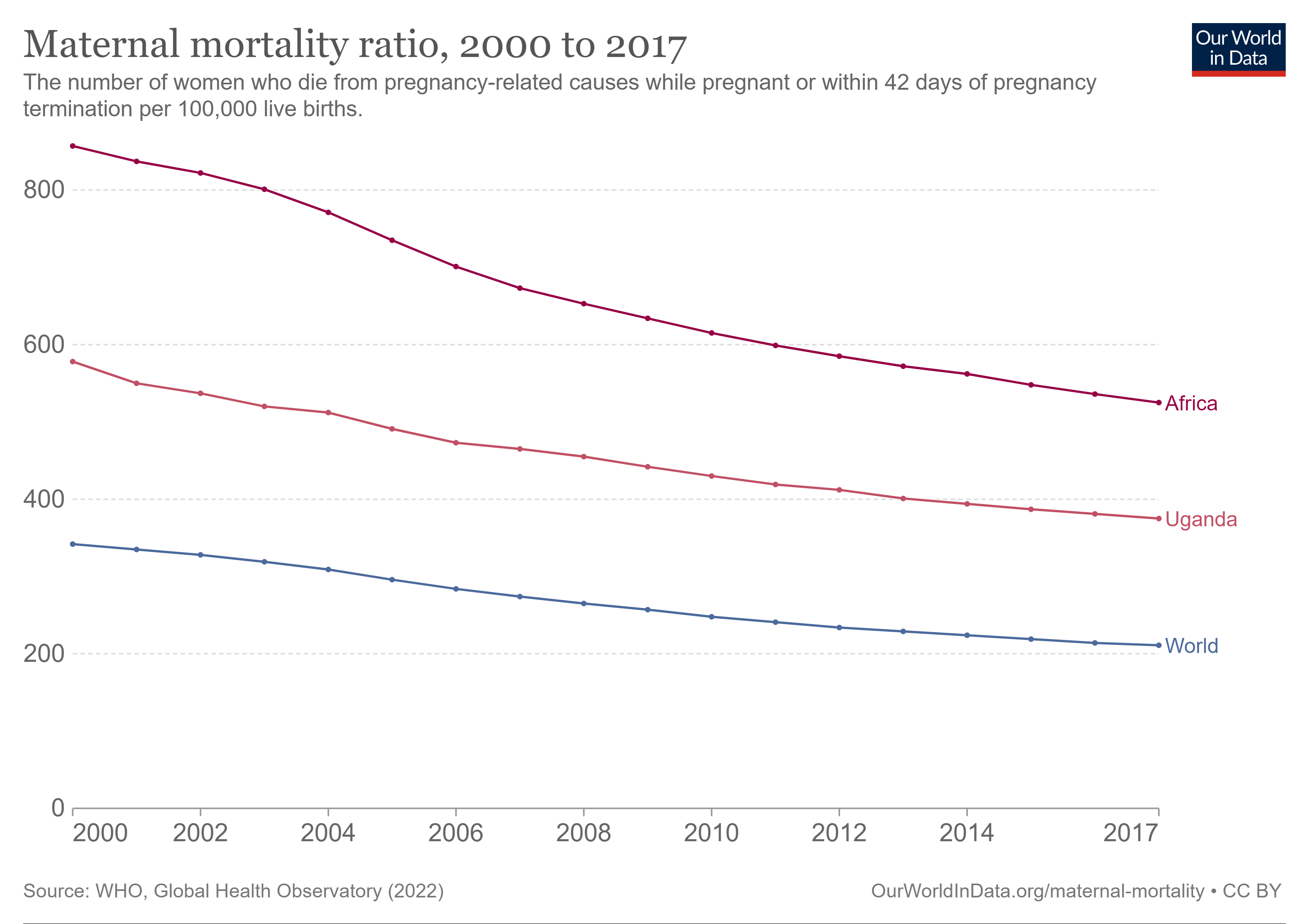
MMR

Uganda, like many developing countries, has high maternal mortality ratio at 153 per 100,000 live births. According to the World Health Organization (WHO), a maternal death is the death of a woman while pregnant or within 42 days of termination of pregnancy, irrespective of the duration and site of the pregnancy, from any cause related to or aggravated by the pregnancy or its management but not from accidental or incidental causes. In situations where attribution of the cause of death is inadequate, another definition, pregnancy-related death was coined by the United States Centers for Disease Control and Prevention (CDC), defined as the death of a woman while pregnant or within 42 days of termination of pregnancy, irrespective of the cause of death.

For the past decades, billions of money have been invested in maternal health with less results being realized. However, worldwide, there has been a tremendous decline in recent years by 38% between 2000 and 2017 in the maternal mortality rate with higher income regions performing better than countries in lower income regions. This was clearly noted by WHO in 2017, where over 300,000 women died from pregnancy related complications of which 57,000 deaths were in South Asia and 200,000 in Sub Saharan Africa. Uganda a country in the Sub-Saharan Africa Region has a much lower maternal mortality ratio, 153 versus 500 deaths per 100,000 in the region. In March 2021, the maternal mortality rate in Uganda dropped from 438 deaths per 100,000 births in 2011 to 368 deaths per 100,000. This drop reflects a steady decline, which began from 2000 onwards. However, maternal mortality in Uganda is still far above the global average, which was 152 deaths per 100,000 live births in 2020. More so, the pooled estimate fertility rate in Sub Saharan Africa was 5 children per woman which is significantly less than that of Uganda at 4.6. This implies that Uganda is doing fairly well compared to other countries in the region.

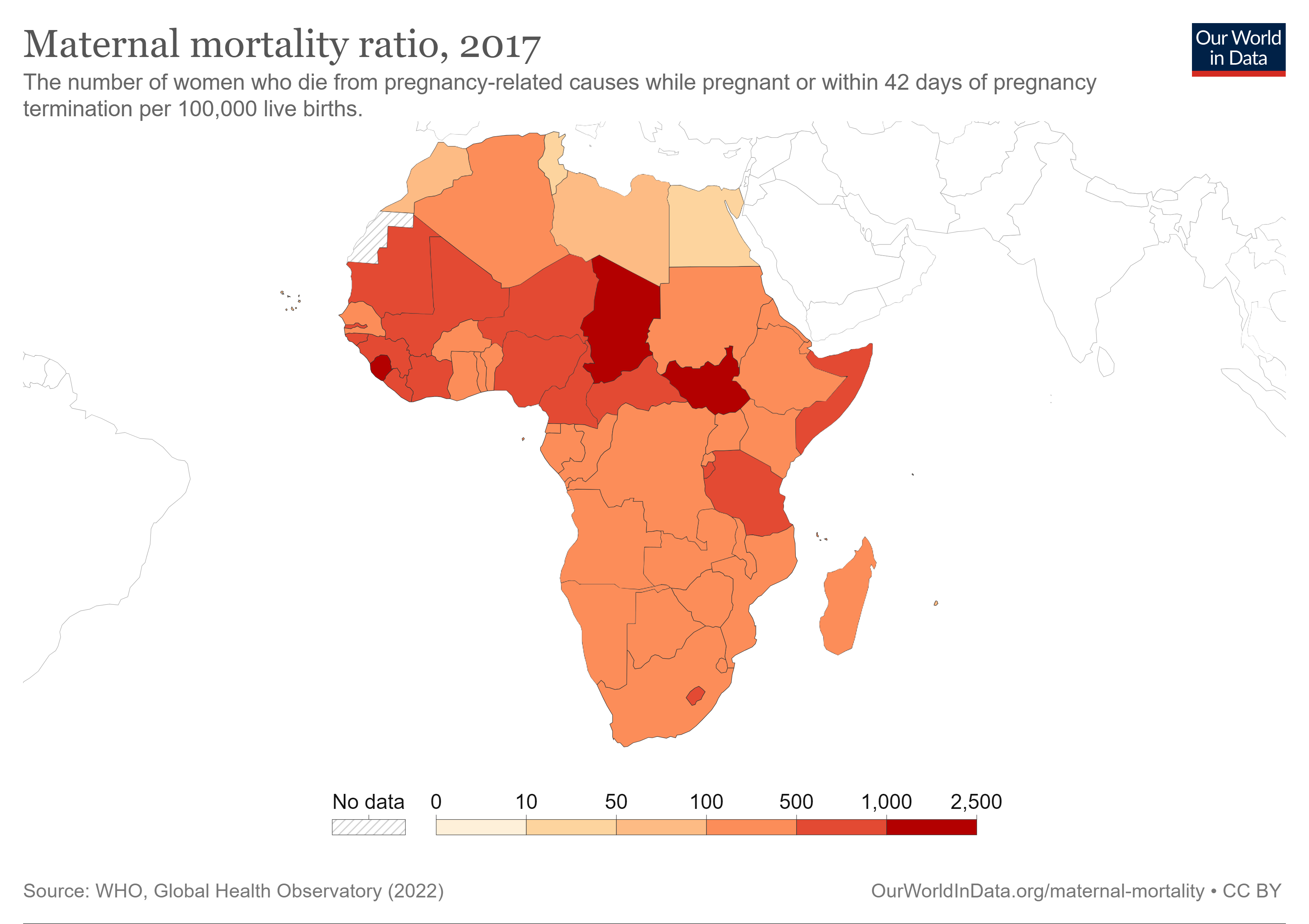

This is suggesting that when compared to other nations in the same region, Uganda has more teen pregnancies and births. However, the region averages only 19 seats in parliament, which is much lower than Uganda. 22.2% of women in the region have at least a secondary education. This is significantly higher than Uganda suggesting that higher education for women is more difficult to achieve in Uganda compared to the average number in the region. 62.9% of women in Sub-Saharan Africa are actively participating in the labor force. Uganda seems to have greater participation from women than the region's average. Uganda is the average when it comes to contraceptive use in the region suggesting this is an issue of that entire region. 73.6% of women attend at least one antenatal care visit in the region. Uganda's is higher, suggesting more Uganda women take advantage of healthcare services than other women in the region. Uganda is also the average for the region in percent of births done with the aid of a skilled attendant also suggesting this is a regional issue.

== Maternal mortality causes ==
In Uganda, the causes of maternal death have changed over time and are generally preventable. The leading causes of maternal death include haemorrhage, high blood pressure, unsafe abortions and infections. These causes can be explained using the three delays model approach used by most studies examining maternal mortality.

The three delays model

This is a framework that explains what causes overwhelming maternal deaths and these include delays in seeking care, delays in arrival at the health facilities and delays in providing adequate care while at the health facilities. This allows the responsible people to rectify the problem as soon as possible. This model is very important because it diagnoses the reasons behind maternal deaths. Delay one includes obstacles that impact the woman and her family's awareness of complications or decision to seek health care. In Uganda, cultural norms significantly impact a woman's decision to seek health care. Specifically, decision-making in regards to health care is not the woman's jurisdiction alone, but rather the family's as a unit. As a result the pregnant women facing the complications may not get the immediate treatment they need resulting to serious consequences. Delay two in arrival at the health facility also plays a strong role in maternal mortality in Uganda and also delay three which is delayed adequate healthcare while at the health facility.

Previous causes of maternal mortality

This is similar to what we had previously where other factors attributable to this high MMR in Uganda, were often a reflection of access to health care services. Even when health care services are available, healthcare worker under-staffing is common often with low medical supplies such as essential medication which can also have an effect. The health of a mother impacts the family and even the entire community. Her ability and access to receive necessary healthcare largely determines health outcomes for herself and her baby. Traditionally, Ugandan women seek to handle birth on their own as it is a time when they can use their own power and make their own decisions which can also be a factor in such a high maternal mortality rate. Many women report mistreatment from healthcare personnel as an additional reason to avoid seeking professional care during pregnancy and labor. A study also found that a majority of Ugandan women lack health literacy and in turn seek care in more traditional or homeopathic ways. Malaria is also a substantial issue. Pregnant women and their newborn babies are particularly susceptible to complications related to malaria, which is endemic in Uganda. This is also an issue that needs to be addressed in order to improve maternal mortality in Uganda.

== Maternal health as a capability and why it matters ==
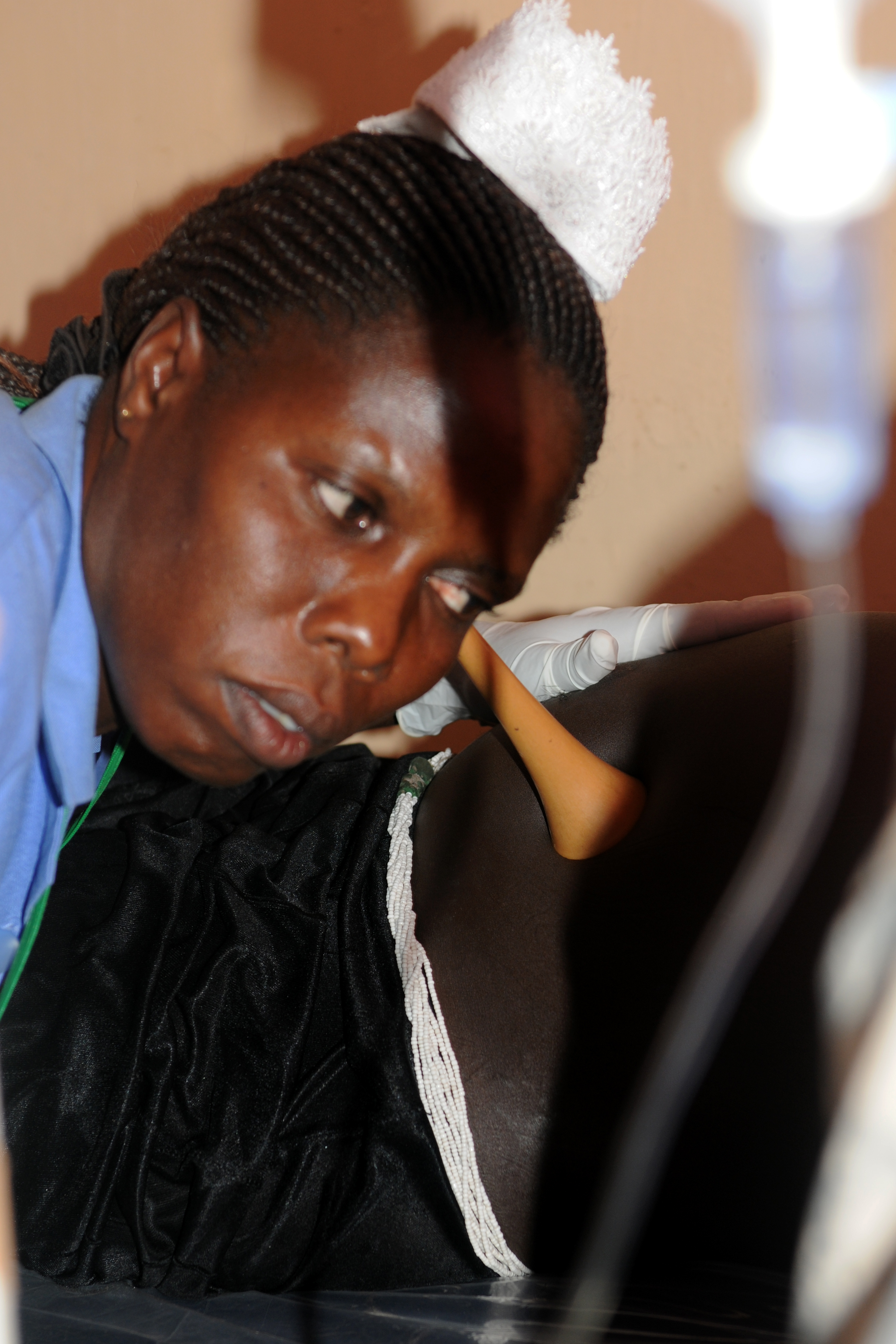
A nurse in Uganda monitoring a patient's heart rate with a Pinard horn stethoscope.

The WHO defines health as a state of complete physical, mental and social well-being and not merely the absence of disease or infirmity. Furthermore WHO defines health as the enjoyment of the highest attainable standard of health and is one of the fundamental rights of every human being. Amartya K. Sen, a feminist economist, adds to that as he said that health is among the most important conditions of human life and a critically significant constituent of human capabilities which we have reason to value. It has been found that healthier nations, or those with a greater life expectancy and lower infant mortality, see greater economic growth and prosperity. The argument has also been made the other way that economic growth contributes to healthier nations. It is not just the overall availability of resources that improves health, but access by the public to those resources. Sen argues that health only improves during economic prosperity if there is a shift in resource allocation towards health and education, equitable distribution of income, and extensive employment programs to decrease the unemployment rate.

Sen writes, "The factors that can contribute to health achievements and failures go well beyond health care, and include many influences of very different kinds, varying from (genetic) propensities, individual incomes, food habits and lifestyle, on the one hand, to the epidemiological environment and work conditions, on the other...We have to go well beyond the delivery and distribution of health care to get an adequate understanding of health achievement and capability."

UNICEF found that healthy children need healthy mothers. A woman in Sub-Saharan Africa has a 1 in 16 chance of dying in childbirth. The report found that at least 20% of the burden of disease in children below the age of 5 is related to poor maternal health and nutrition, as well as the quality of care at delivery and during the newborn period. Yearly, 8 million babies die before or during delivery or in the first week of life. Further, many children are tragically left motherless each year. These children are 10 times more likely to die within two years of their mothers' death. It has also been found that the health of the mother vastly affects the health of all of her children. The health of our mothers vastly impacts the health and success of our future generations.

== Maternal mortality and morbidity ==
The World Health Organization (WHO) defines maternal health as the health of women during pregnancy, childbirth and the postpartum period. According to estimates from Uganda Bureau of Statistics (UBOS), Uganda's maternal mortality ratio, the annual number of deaths of women from pregnancy-related causes per 100,000 live births stands at 343 after allowing for adjustments. Women die as a result of complications during and following pregnancy and childbirth and the major complications include severe bleeding, infections, unsafe abortion and obstructed labor.

Uganda is slow in its progress in the fifth goal of improving maternal health in its Millennium Development Goals. With the 2015 target for maternal mortality ratio at 131 per 100,000 births and proportion of births attended by skilled health personnel set at 100%, Uganda has a long battle in reaching its intended goals. Moreover, the methodology used and the sample sizes implemented by the Uganda Demographic Health Survey (UDHS) do not allow for precise estimates of maternal mortality. This suggests that the estimates collated are erroneous and it is conceivable that the actual rates could be much higher than those reported.

Uganda has over the years had a decline in infant and under-five mortality. The most common causes of under-five mortality are pneumonia (16 per cent), malaria (13 per cent), diarrhea (10 per cent) and HIV and AIDs (7 per cent). Child mortality is differently across the country. Karamojia, Southwest, West Nile and the western regions have the highest mortality. Although there is a decline in mortality, 1 out of 11 children dies before they turn five years old. Although the maternal mortality has increased from 435 in 1990 to 438 in 2011 per 1000 child, the neonatal mortality has dropped from 29 in 1990 to 27 in 2001 per 1000 child.

High maternal mortality rates persist in Uganda due to an overall low use of contraceptives, limited capacity of health facilities to manage abortion/miscarriage complications and prevalence of HIV/AIDS among pregnant women. Despite malaria being one of the leading causes of morbidity in pregnant women, prevention and prophylaxis services are not well established.

== Human Development Report 2011 ==
The Human Development Report ranked 183 countries based on a variety of criteria. Uganda ranked 161 out of 183 countries. Its high ranking puts it under the Low Human Development category. The Human Development Index (HDI) is a composite index that measures the achievement of countries in three basic dimensions of human development-a long and healthy life, knowledge, and a decent standard of living. Uganda received a value of 0.446. The closer the number is to one, the better the country is in regards to human development. Norway is ranked at number one with a HDI of 0.943. The next variable that was taken into consideration is life expectancy at birth in years. Uganda's life expectancy is 54.1 years. The mean number of years in school is the average number of years of education received by people ages 25 and older. In Uganda the mean is only 4.7. Expected years of schooling is the number of years of schooling that a child of school entrance can expect to receive if prevailing patterns of age-specific enrollment rates persist throughout the child's life. I Uganda, the expected years of schooling is 10.8. The Gross National Income (GNI) is the aggregate income of an economy generated by its production and its ownership of factors of production, less the incomes paid for the use of factors of production owned by the rest of the world, converted to international dollars using purchasing power parity rates divided by the midyear population. In Uganda the GNI is $1,124.00. The GNI per capita rank minus the HDI rank: Difference in ranking by GNI per capita and by the HDI. In Uganda this measure is 7. The last measure is the Nonincome HDI, which is the value of the HDI computed from the life expectancy and education indicators only. In Uganda this measure is 0.506.

The Gender Inequality Index (GDI) is a composite measure that reflects inequality in achievements between women and men in three categories: reproductive health, empowerment, and the labor market. Out of 183 countries, Uganda ranks 11th and the maternal mortality is 343 per 100,000 live births. The fertility rate adolescents (ages 15–19) is 149.9 per 1,000. Women currently hold 37.2 seats in parliament. Only a meager 9.1% of the female population has a secondary education or higher. 78.3% of women are participating in the labor force. Only 24% of women who are in their childbearing years use some sort of contraceptive method. 94% of women are receiving at least 1 antenatal visit, but only 42% are giving birth with the aid of a skilled attendant. The fertility rate in Uganda is 5.59 children per female. Based on the information given in these tables there appears to be a correlation between the high maternal mortality ratio and high fertility rate which could be associated with low contraceptive use. The low percentage of women giving birth with a skilled birth attendant could also be associated with a high maternal mortality ratio.

Low secondary education rates, low access to health care services, low use of contraceptives coupled with high fertility rates is contributing to a high percentage of maternal mortality in Uganda. However, we do see a high labor force participation which could potentially lead increase empowerment for women and an increase in monetary gain to spend on health services. However, currently the high labor force participation does not seem to be aiding Uganda women in regards to maternal health. Uganda's extremely low percentage of women with at least a secondary education could also be attributed to a higher fertility rate and less desirable birth outcomes, as education affects health literacy and identifying the need for assistance from a skilled birth attendant. Studies have shown how the poor health of women can have a negative impact on economic achievement for the country as a whole. Low economic development then constrains the capability of women to achieve better health.

=== Poor quality of healthcare services ===
Almost all women in developing countries have at least four antenatal care visits, are attended to by a skilled health worker during childbirth, and receive postpartum care. In contrast, only 47% of Ugandan women receive antenatal care coverage and only 42% of births are attended by skilled health personnel. Among the poorest 20% of the population, the share of births attended by skilled health personnel was 29% in 2005/2006 as compared to 77% among the wealthiest 20% of the population. The case of Jennifer Anguko, a popular elected official who bled slowly to death in the maternity ward in a major hospital, aptly exemplifies the poor state of maternal health care that is provided to women, even in major urban healthcare facilities.

Despite the national policy of promoting maternal health through promoting informed choice, service accessibility and improved quality of care through the national Safe Motherhood Programme (SMP), it remains a challenge to the Ugandan government as to how it would achieve its 2015 Millennium Development Goals of reducing maternal mortality rates and 100% births attended to by skilled health personnel. In order to achieve future economic growth, it is vital that the population remains healthy.

A study was done in 2007 in 54 districts and 553 health facilities in Uganda to determine the availability of emergency obstetric care and its related maternal deaths. The study found that few of these units had running water; electricity or a functional operating theater. However, having these items was shown to have a protective effect on maternal deaths.

The availability of midwives had the highest protective effect, reducing the case fatality rate by 80%. This study found that while 97.2% of health facilities were expected to have emergency obstetric care services, few had provided these services. This is the most likely explanation for the high health facility-based maternal death rate of 671 per 100,000 live births in Uganda in 2007. The study concluded that addressing health system issues, particularly among human resources, and increasing access to emergency obstetric care could reduce maternal mortality.

== Limited access to healthcare services ==
=== Cultural barriers in seeking access ===
There is not only the issue of a lack of resources in healthcare services, there are also cultural barriers in women seeking professional care. Ugandan women adhere to very traditional birthing practices and believe that pregnancy is a test of endurance and maternal death is merely a sad but normal event. This cultural view hinders the chances of women seeking professional maternal care. In the Kiboga community it is evident that pregnancy and childbirth are some of the major areas where women still command power and status, which they strive to embody in order to enhance their status within the household and community.

Another factor preventing women from seeking emergency obstetric care among Ugandan women is the cultural desire for Ugandan women to 'protect their own integrity.' A common birthing practice is for women to give birth completely alone and the individual is the one who decides if outside help is needed. It has also been found that women feel that they have the most power and control during the birthing process, which is something they often lack in other aspects of their lives. Women are considered to be strong and independent if they can handle the birthing process by themselves. These beliefs often lead to very dangerous circumstances as women often delay assistance, which sometimes costs their life or the life of the baby. Oftentimes one of these main issues is obstructed labor. When women realize labor is not progressing normally they first seek female friends or traditional birth attendants. This can result in a further delay in seeking medical attention from someone who is trained to handle such complications.

A study conducted in 2001 found that one common remedy used for obstructed labor in home births was herbs. As high as 80% of childbirths used herbs. Ugandan culture also sees the birthing process as a woman's affair and therefore oftentimes there is little male involvement. Transportation is also another issue in Uganda. Most families do not own personal cars and cannot afford taxi fares. More remote and rural areas cannot be reached by car but must be reached using a motorcycle. These conditions are not ideal in transporting a woman in labor, so women tend to choose to stay home during labor. Women also avoid healthcare facilities as this also inhibits their own integrity. They feel that they are powerless in a hospital, have little say in decisions, and know little about procedures being done to them. There is also a lack of medical supplies in Ugandan hospitals and healthcare is run on a fee for service basis. Many women do not have the funds necessary to both travel to a hospital and pay for hospital services and supplies. Or if they do have the funds, hospitals could also be out of supplies. This further discourages them from giving birth in a healthcare setting.

There is an urgent need to educate both men and women on the risks of having home or solitary childbirths that are not assisted by a skilled attendant. A study conducted in 2011, suggests that birthing outcomes would improve if men were intimately involved in the process and could assist in making decisions regarding obstructed labor or other complications. The integrity of women could be maintained if health workers were more compassionate and more able to support women and provide understandable information during labor. There is also a great need to improve both access and quality of healthcare offered to the masses in Uganda.

=== Emergency response ===
One major issue in regard to maternal health is access to quality emergency obstetric care and the many barriers Ugandan women face to gain access to such care. A needs assessment of emergency obstetric care was carried out in 197 health facilities in 19 out of 5 health districts in Uganda, covering 38% of the total population. The study found in 2005, that there was a large number of missing signal functions at health facilities and an urgent need to improve the availability of emergency obstetric care. It was found that the improvement of care begins by improving district health workers' skills in emergency obstetric care so that they can effectively manage and treat obstetric complications. Part of this training includes hospital staff on how to properly manage data systems to better monitor and evaluate program implementation. An effective advocacy tool, known as REDUCE, has already been developed for Uganda to stimulate policy dialog and strategic planning. The REDUCE tool uses computer models to estimate the human and economic consequences of maternal mortality, and generates data that can be used to create arguments for giving higher priority to maternal mortality reduction in creating policies, strategy development, and resource allocation.

=== Distance, quality, bypassing ===
A number of barriers to the use of professional maternal health services have been identified, including distance to facilities and perceived quality of services. A study conducted in 2003 examined the proportion of deliveries from individuals in local area and the number of deliveries each year for several different facilities to assess barriers influencing an individual's access to maternal health care. The results of the study found that many people travel outside their local area, bypassing several other healthcare facilities, to reach more popular services–facilities with a high number of deliveries per year. Women associated popularity with a higher quality of care and costs, making the extra travel time worth it. As a result of this perceived quality of care, some facilities are underutilized and others over-stretched, decreasing the availability of staff and supplies.

=== Mistreatment by medical personnel ===
In 2003, a study was conducted in Hoima, Uganda, whose aim was to examine the reasons why women continued to choose high-risk options when faced with complications of pregnancy and delivery, ultimately leading to severe morbidity and mortality. The study found that women considered the use of primary health units and the referral hospital when complication occurred as a last resort. Women reported that a lack of skilled staff, complaints of abuse, neglect, and poor treatment in the hospital, and poorly understood reasons for procedures, plus health workers' views that women are ignorant, also explain why many women consider going to a hospital for delivery as a last resort.

=== Limited reproductive health literacy ===
Many women do not utilize healthcare services because they do not understand reasons for procedures. Health literacy is a large issue among women in Uganda. It not only affects birthing outcomes but also information on reproductive care. Another study conducted in 2012, found that many Ugandan women rely on myths, rumors, and misconceptions that discourage them from using reproductive health services, particularly family planning.

Another study conducted in 2011 found that even those pregnant women who attended antenatal classes had very little knowledge of danger signs during pregnancy. An association was found between birthing preparedness and knowledge of danger signs. The most common birth preparedness practice was saving money to facilitate referral in case of complications. While only 68% of women in the study had attended at least four antenatal care visits during their last pregnancy. Only 19% of women in the study could indicate at least three danger signs. This shows that a considerable share of those who seek professional care are not receiving or retaining vital information. It was found that women appear to be unaware of the risk they take by subjecting themselves to prolonged labor. The study found that among women who went to antenatal visits 40% had not been advised where to deliver and the staff were allegedly unfriendly. There also seems to be an association between having a delivery by skilled birth attendants and being under the age of twenty. It is hoped that it is becoming more culturally acceptable to give birth with the assistance of a skilled attendant than it is among the older generations. The study concluded that every woman should be made aware of the likelihood of complications during pregnancy, childbirth, labour, and the postpartum periods. There has also been success using mobile phones to provide health information in HIV programs in Uganda. Since mobile phones are becoming more and more common, it appears this could also be a good route for antenatal education.

=== Reliance on traditional medicine ===
In rural areas, conceiving pregnant women seek the help of traditional birth attendants (TBAs) due to difficulty in accessing formal health services and also high transportation or treatment costs. TBAs are trusted as they embody the cultural and social life of the community. However, the TBAs' lack of knowledge and training and the use of traditional practices have led to risky medical procedures resulting in high maternal mortalities.

In 2006 it was found that some rural areas of Uganda up to 90% of the population uses traditional medicine for day to day healthcare needs. The World Health Organization estimates that 80% of the developing world uses traditional medicinal practices. It was found that over 80% of child births that are conducted at home use herbal remedies in the Bushenyi district of Uganda. Over seventy five plants have been recorded for use to induce labor and some of these plants could be oxytocic. The danger lies in levels of dosage as to whether or not the plants could potentially bring harm to the mother and baby. These medicinal herbs are often used because Ugandans cannot afford western pharmaceuticals. These herbal remedies are also socially and culturally accepted. In Uganda reproductive health issues such as maternal mortality and morbidity, account for the number one disease burden. Perinatal and maternal-related conditions account for 20.4%, malaria 15.4%, acute lower respiratory infections 10.5%, AIDS 9.1%, and diarrhea 8.4%. These conditions account for over 60% of the total burden.

In Uganda, it is viewed that a woman who had died in childbirth is equated to a soldier who had died during a war. Maternal death is considered a natural phenomenon and encourages the use of herbs, while undermining safe birthing practices with a skilled birth attendant. Women in Uganda are generally more disadvantaged than men. There tends to be a patriarchal order of communities. Therefore, women have a very limited control of resources and in most cases have poorer health. The study found that dosing and toxicity levels need to be monitored in the use of medicinal herbs during labor. There is a need for further field and laboratory research to establish appropriate dosage levels. In 2006, the maternal mortality rate in Uganda is 506 deaths per 100,00 live births. There is a need for health provision programs, safe motherhood programs, health policies in reproductive health care, and collaborative approaches involving traditional medicinal practitioners such as traditional birth attendants. It is possible that a lack of knowledge on plant species used to induce labor and speed up childbirth could be one of the main factors that contribute to high maternal mortality in Uganda.

=== Malaria and pregnancy ===
Malaria is a leading cause of morbidity and mortality in Uganda. It is especially lethal among pregnant women and children under five. The mortality rate for all ages is estimated at 32.1% in 2004. A study in Mukono, Uganda, determined that the most effective delivery system of intermittent preventive treatment (IPTp) for pregnant women was that education was a factor in health seeking behaviors. Those who were a part of the study accessed IPTp early and most of them adhered to the two doses of SP. Women experienced a reduction in malaria episodes, anemia, parasitaemia and low birth weight. While these results cannot be attributed to the intervention alone, after controlling for age, education, parity, and occupation, there were still significant differences for parasitaemia, reported malaria episodes and birth weight, indicating the importance of access and adherence to IPTp.

== Perception on pregnancy influence patterns of seeking care ==
Uganda's socioeconomic and political instability, characterized by the destruction of health infrastructure, chronic shortages of staff and healthcare supplies, low wages for health workers, low accessibility to health services and mistreatment by medical personnel, have long been to blame for its high infant and maternal mortality rate. Although these barriers play a substantial role in the limited access to healthcare services in Uganda, it has also become apparent that the way in which women perceive pregnancy can heavily influence patterns of seeking care.

Some perceive pregnancy as natural, an honor, an achievement, or an exaltation of femininity, that brings joy to families and awards women respect, power, and status in their community. Oftentimes these women feel socially accepted and excited for their futures, motivating them to seek antenatal care. Others perceive pregnancy as a life-threatening experience, characterized by fear, unpredictable timing, and a level of uncertainty. They often define their pregnancies as a painful or regrettable experience, especially if they conceived accidentally or against their will. This mentality towards pregnancy is associated with a decrease in the amount of antenatal care sought, exacerbating issues surrounding maternal health.

Many women also define their pregnancy based on sociocultural values systems, including through gender and power relations. In societies where women are seen as inferior to men in the public sphere, the idea that birthing yields immense power has been attributed to the nature of childbearing. It is not uncommon for women to conceptualize their birth as a battle–a test of endurance and tolerance of physical pain. This conceptualization often leads to pregnant women suppressing their concerns about potential complications or the need for immediate medical attention.

It is crucial that one understands various childbirth experiences and perceptions, as it allows individuals to better understand patterns of seeking care and how to approach individualized and culturally sensitive maternal health care.

== See also ==
- Women in Uganda
- Child health in Uganda
- Abortion in Uganda
- Priscilla Busingye – Ugandan physician dedicated to maternal healthcare
