= George Christopher =

George Christopher may refer to:

- George Christopher (mayor) (1907–2000), Greek-American politician, mayor of San Francisco, 1956–1964
- George Christopher (actor) (born 1970), British actor
- George Christopher (1826–1881), British tightrope walker and acrobat
- George H. Christopher (1888–1959), American Democratic politician from Missouri
- George Christopher, a character on the TV series Bored to Death

== See also ==
- Chris George (disambiguation)
