= Ministry of Finance, Planning and Economic Development (Uganda) =

Government ministry of Uganda

Coordinates: 00°18′59″N 32°35′10″E

- Coat of Arms of Uganda

Ministry overview
- Formed: January 1, 1995
- Type: Ministry
- Jurisdiction: Government of Uganda
- Headquarters: 2-12 Apollo Kaggwa Road, Central Division of Kampala, Uganda
- Ministry executive: Matia Kasaija, Minister of Ministry of Finance, Planning and Economic Development
- Website: finance.go.ug

The Ministry of Finance, Planning and Economic Development (MoFPED) is a cabinet-level government ministry of Uganda. Its mandate is to formulate sound economic and fiscal policies, mobilize resources for the implementation of government programmes, disburse public resources as appropriated by Parliament, and account for their use in accordance with national laws and international best practices. The cabinet minister of finance is Matia Kasaija. MoFPED was created by the 1995 Constitution of Uganda and derives its power from the Constitution and related acts of parliament, including the 2001 Budget Act and the 2003 Public Finance and Accountability Act. The current Director of Economic Affairs in the Ministry of Finance, Planning and Economic Development of Uganda is Lawrence Kiiza.

== History ==
MoFPED was created by the 1995 Constitution of Uganda, at the time, there were two departments: a Ministry of Finance (MoF) and a Ministry of Planning and Economic Development (MPED). By 1995, the government launched the Poverty Eradication Action Plan (PEAP) in order to prioritise poverty eradication. was formulated after a long consultative process with a wide range of stakeholders. The process was spearheaded by MPED.

In 1998, the MoF and MPED were merged into the Ministry of Finance, Planning and Economic Development (MoFPED), which the World Bank noted was "critical in establishing fiscal discipline, while building links between policy formulation, planning, and budgeting". The merger led to an emphasis on coordinating the budget process and introducing output-oriented budgeting within a medium-term expenditure framework. Many of these early reforms had a "cutting-edge dimension"; Uganda was one of the first countries in Africa to adopt a semi-autonomous revenue agency (the Uganda Revenue Authority) as well as introduce medium-term budgeting. Implementation, however, had a lot of room for improvement.

In 2010, MoFPED started receiving detailed project-by-project reports on budget allocations and quarterly expenditures from local governments through a digital budget reporting tool. However, local stakeholders, including elected representatives whose mandate it is to monitor service provision, are largely unaware of this information. In order to solve this issue, MoFPED partnered with Innovations for Poverty Action (IPA), the Overseas Development Institute (ODI), and Advocates Coalition for Development and Environment (ACODE) in 2014 to launch a Budget Transparency Initiative to make department, project-, and location-specific budget information available to politicians, opinion leaders, and the public as well as mobilize them to monitor and provide feedback on the spending and services provided by government institutions.

== Ministers of Finance ==
- Christopher George Frederick Frampton Melmoth, 1956 - 1961
- Lawrence Sebalu, July 1961 - March 1962
- Christopher George Frederick Frampton Melmoth, March 1962 - April 1962
- Amos Sempa, April 1962 - 1964
- Lawrence Kalule Settala, 1964 - January 1971
- Emmanuel Blayo Wakhweya, January 1971 - 1975
- M. S. Kiyingi, July 1975 - July 1976
- Moses Ali, July 1976 - 1978
- Jumba Masagazi, 1978 - April 1979
- Sam Sebagereka, April 1979 – June 1979
- Jack Sentongo, June 1979 – May 1980
- Lawrence Sebalu, May 1980
- Apollo Milton Obote, December 1980 – July 1985
- Abraham Waligo, July 1985 – January 1986
- Ponsiano Mulema, January 1986 - September 1986
- Crispus Kiyonga, September 1986 - February 1992
- Jehoash Mayanja Nkangi, February 1992 - May 1998
- Gerald Ssendaula, 1998 - 2005
- Ezra Suruma, 2005 - February 2009
- Syda Bbumba, 2009 - 2011
- Maria Kiwanuka, 2011 - 2015
- Matia Kasaija, 2015 -

== Structure ==
=== Finance ministries ===
The ministry is divided into the following political and administrative sub-divisions:

- Minister of Finance, Planning and Economic Development, currently Matia Kasaija. The minister is responsible for (a) Formulation of fiscal and monetary policies (b) Control and management of public finance (d) Prepare and lay before Parliament the Annual Budget (e) Mobilise domestic and external resources and (f) Responsible for accountability to the Parliament of Uganda.
- Minister of State for General Duties, currently Gabriel Ajedra Aridru. The minister of state is responsible for (a) deputising the Senior Minister, (b) responsible for parliamentary matters (c) responsible for procurement matters (d) responsible for the Departed Asians Property Custodian Board and (e) responsible for regional matters.
- Minister of State for Planning, currently David Bahati. This state minister is responsible for (a) spearheading economic planning and monitoring (b) capacity building (c) poverty eradication issues (d) population matters, statistics, science and technology issues and (e) may deputise/represent/act for the Senior Minister.
- Minister of State for Privatization and Investment, currently Evelyn Anite. The state minister for privatisation is responsible for (a) promotion of investment, (b) supervision of Uganda Investment Authority, (c) responsible for private sector issues (d) responsible for the Capital Markets Authority (e) responsible for supervision of privatization and the parastatal reform program and (f) may perform any other official duties assigned by the Senior Minister.
- Minister of State for Micro Finance and Enterprise Development, currently Haruna Kasolo Kyeyune. This state minister is responsible for (a) development and implementation of government's micro finance policy and regulation (b) development of policies for community based enterprises and (c) may perform any other official duties assigned by the Senior Minister.

=== MoFPED sub-agencies ===
MoFPED supervises the following government agencies:

- Insurance Regulatory Authority of Uganda (IRAU)
- Uganda National Council of Science and Technology (UNCST)
- The Microfinance Support Centre Limited
- Tax Appeals Tribunal (TAT)
- National Enterprise Corporation (NEC)
- Public Procurement and Disposal of Public Assets Authority (PPDA)
- Uganda Investment Authority (UIA)
- Economic Policy Research Centre (EPRC)
- The Population Secretariat
- Departed Asians Property Custodian Board (DAPCB)
- Non-Performing Assets Recovery Trust
- Non-Performing Assets Recovery Tribunal

=== Autonomous government agencies ===
The ministry works closely with the following autonomous government agencies:

- Uganda Bureau of Statistics (UBOS)
- Uganda Revenue Authority (URA)
- Bank of Uganda (BOU)
- Capital Markets Authority of Uganda (CMA)
- National Planning Authority (NPA)
- Uganda Property Holding (UPHL)
- Uganda Development Bank Limited (UDBL)

== See also ==
- Economy of Uganda
- Government of Uganda
- Cabinet of Uganda
