= Amos Sempa =

Uganda's politician (1925–2026)

Amos Kalule Sempa (28 December 1925 – 27 September 1985) was a Ugandan politician.

== Life and career ==
Sempa was born 28 December 1925 in Kiwumu in the Central Uganda.

He was the Minister of Finance between April 1962 and 1964.

He died on 27 September 1985, aged in Makindye Hill, Kampala.
