= Matia Kasaija =

Ugandan politician (born 1944)

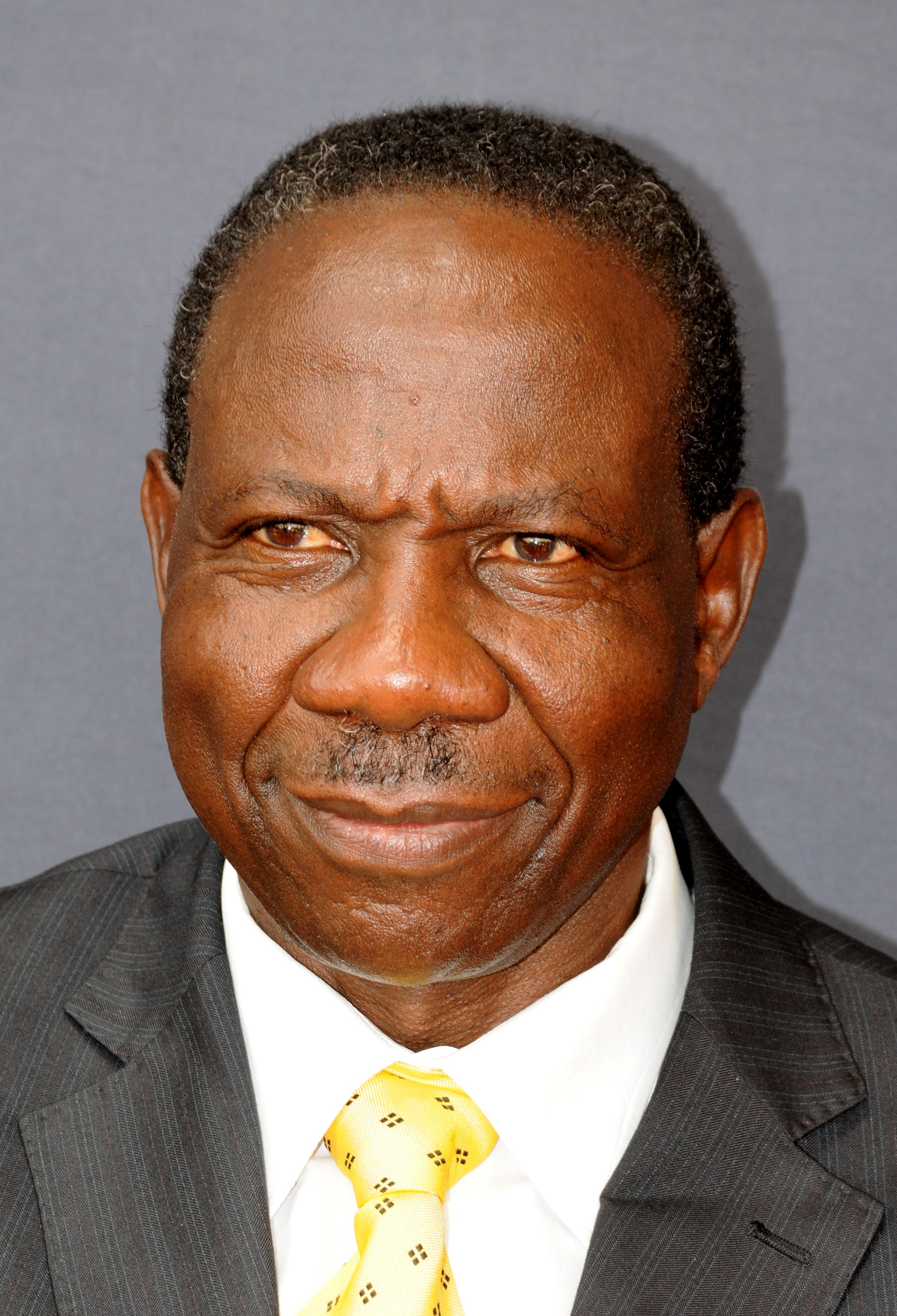
- Kasaija in 2009
- Born: 28 May 1944 (age 82); Kibaale District, British Uganda (present-day Uganda)
- Education: University of Nairobi (Bachelor of Commerce)
- Occupation: Politician
- Years active: 1980–present
- Known for: Politics
- Title: Ugandan Minister of Finance

Matia Kasaija (born 28 May 1944) is a Ugandan politician and diplomat who served as the Minister of Finance of Uganda from March 2015 to May 2026.

From 27 May 2011 until 28 February 2015, he served as the State Minister for Finance (Planning) in the Cabinet of Uganda. He replaced Ephraim Kamuntu, who was promoted to Minister of Tourism. Before that, he served as the State Minister for Internal Affairs, from 1 June 2006 until May 2011. He is also the elected Member of Parliament for Buyanja County in Kibaale District.

== Early life and education ==
Kasaija was born in Kibaale District on 28 May 1944. He studied at University of Nairobi back in the 1960s when it was part of the University of East Africa. Kasaija graduated with the degree of Bachelor of Commerce (BCom) in 1967.

== Career ==
During the 1980 Ugandan elections, Kasaija, who was 36 at the time, was elected to the Ugandan Parliament, representing Buyanja County in Kibaale district. From 1980 until 1981, he served as the State Minister for Labor under Milton Obote's second term. However, in 1981, during the Ugandan Bush War, Kasaija defected to the rebel National Resistance Army (NRA) led by future Ugandan President Yoweri Museveni, and served as a member of the NRA's External Wing from 1981 to 1986.

Between 1987 and 1990, Kasaija served as the executive director of the Departed Asians Property Custodian Board, a government parastatal that was charged with safeguarding the property expropriated from the Asians who were expelled from the country by Idi Amin in the 1970s. In 1998, he served as the deputy director for mass mobilization at the National Resistance Movement Secretariat. During the 2006 parliamentary elections, he was elected to the 8th Parliament, and was appointed Minister of State for Internal Affairs in June of that same year. In the national elections of 2011, he was re-elected to his parliamentary seat. In the cabinet reshuffle on 27 May 2011, he was reassigned to the Ministry of Finance, Planning and Economic Development as the State Minister for Planning. Following the 2026 elections, he was removed from his position.

He was re-elected to represent Buyanja County in Kibaale District in the 12th parliament of Uganda.

== Other activities ==
- African Development Bank (AfDB), Ex-Officio Member of the Board of Governors (since 2015)
- East African Development Bank (EADB), Ex-Officio Member of the Governing Council (since 2015)
- International Monetary Fund (IMF), Ex-Officio Member of the Board of Governors (since 2015)
- Islamic Development Bank, Ex-Officio Member of the Board of Governors (since 2015)
- Multilateral Investment Guarantee Agency (MIGA), World Bank Group, Ex-Officio Member of the Board of Governors (since 2015)
- World Bank, Ex-Officio Member of the Board of Governors (since 2015)
- Global Partnership for Effective Development Co-operation, Co-chair (-2019)

== Personal details ==
Matia Kasaija is married. He is reported to enjoy travel, swimming, reading, and sports.

== See also ==
- Parliament of Uganda
- Cabinet of Uganda
- Kibaale District
