= Kiiza Eron =

Ugandan poet, lawyer

Eron Kiiza
- Born: August 12, 1983 (age 42); Kabale district, Uganda
- Education: Muntuyera High School (High School Diploma); Uganda Christian University (Bachelor of Laws); Law Development Centre (Post Graduate Diploma in Legal Practice)
- Occupations: Poet, lawyer, and environmentalist
- Organization(s): Kizza & Mugisha Advocates Attorneys
- Known for: Lawyer to Ugandan novelist Kakwenza Rukirabashaija
- Spouse: Sylvia Tumwebaze

Eron Kiiza (born August 12, 1983) is a Ugandan poet, lawyer, and environmentalist. He is the co-founder of Kiiza & Mugisha Advocates and CEO of The Environment Shield Limited. He is an Advocate of the High Court of Uganda, a member of the Uganda Law Society and the East African Law Society. Eron was nominated for the 2022 European Union Human Rights Defender of the Year award. He was awarded by the National Coalition of Human Rights Defenders Uganda in 2020 as the Central Uganda Human Rights Defender of the Year. He was also recognized by LASPNET as an outstanding Public Interest Lawyer in 2022.

== Early life and education ==
Eron was born at Kabale Hospital in Kabale District in western Uganda to Asiimwe Maud (mother) and Mbabazi Alban (father) and was brought up in Ntungamo District. He started education from Rukura Primary School and later joined Kitunga Day and Boarding Primary School for his primary education. After his primary education, Eron joined Muntuyera High School for his entire secondary education for six years. He holds a Bachelor of Laws Degree (LLB) from Uganda Christian University (UCU) and a Post Graduate Diploma in Legal Practice that he attained from Law Development Centre, Kampala . Eron has also attended courses at Uganda Martyrs University, the University of Pretoria, the Media Legal Defense Initiative, 2015 USA's International Visitor Leadership Program (IVLP), the 2018 Internet Governance Forum (IGF) and the 2019 Stockholm Internet Forum.

== Career ==
During his secondary, Eron thought he would actually become a journalist after being a leader and a new leader for Muntuyera High school. He is currently a member of the Uganda Law Society Rule of Law Committee and Human Rights Cluster and the Advisory Committee of Network for Public Interest Lawyers (NETPIL).

== Cases ==
In 2021, Eron was part of the legal team that advocated for the release of Nicholas Opiyo a human rights lawyer that was arrested after allegations of money laundering. Eron also spearheaded the campaign against the degradation of Bugoma Forest in Hoima District in the North Western part of Uganda. He represented a group of more than 3000 people who were protesting against their eviction from five villages including Kambuye, Kyabaana, Kikoono, Lwensanga and Kanseera in Mubende District by George Kaweesi from a piece of land measuring 322.5 hectares. Eron was the lawyer and advocate to Ugandan novelist and author Kakwenza Rukirabashaija during his trials.

Eron also led climate and environment activists to save and advocate for the conservation of Bugema Forest against Justice Ssekaana and they won.

On January 7, 2025, Mr Kiiza, as one of the key lawyers in opposition figure Kizza Besigye's trial before the military court in Uganda, was convicted (without trial/hearing) on charges of contempt of court for "banging the angle bars and not listening to the chairman of the court" and sentenced to nine months in prison, which was largely seen as part of the Ugandan regime's unjust and unlawful mistreatment of whoever tries to challenge it, including lawyers in general.

== Personal life ==
Eron is married to Sylvia Tumwebaze and the couple has two daughters. He enjoys pumpkin, sweet potatoes, indigenous mushrooms, and indigenous chicken as the foods he likes most.

== Awards ==
- 2022 LASPNET outstanding Public Interest Lawyer.
- Central Uganda Human Rights Defender of the year.
- Notable nomination. Nominated for 2022 EU HRD of the year.

== See also ==
- Kakwenza Rukirabashaija
