= Violent Crime Crack Unit of Uganda =

The Violent Crime Crack Unit (VCCU) is a security agency of the government of Uganda established in 2001. Originally a military unit codenamed "Operation Wembley", it was put under police control and renamed, amid charges of human rights abuses.

VCCU has since been renamed to Violent Crimes Crack Unit in 2003 and it now called Rapid Response Unit (RRU) from 2007. It comes under the Police Criminal Investigation Department (CID). It is headed by the Commissioner David Magara. However, after the renaming, it was given wider roles other than dealing with armed robberies. The new tasks include dealing even in petty crimes. However, the Unit has been accused by national and international organisations of human rights abuses.

The current head of the Rapid response unit is "Hajji" Asuman Mugenyi who was the commander of Police in Masaka and he has just returned from East Timor on International duties.

Operation Wembley was formed in response to organised crime that had brought the city of Kampala to its knees. A military general was put in charge of the Operation Wembley. This general then radically recruited and trained young assassins. Operation Wembley assassins tracked down and destroyed cells of terrorists and organised criminals operating in Kampala by just "killing" them without offering a chance for trial in a criminal court. In contrast this operation brought murders and organised crime in the capital to a halt.

The Violent Crime Crack Unit of Uganda has been accused of carrying out extrajudicial killings and abuses against civilians. It is said that Flying Squad is operated by the same people who were in Operation Wembley.
