= Child health in Uganda =

Children in Uganda are regularly exposed to many preventable health risks. According to the WHO, the country ranks 186th out of 191 eligible countries in life expectancy. There are many cultural factors influencing the current health status of Uganda, including the negative stigma associated with sex and the use of wood-burning stoves. This stigma has resulted in a severe lack of education and communication necessary to improve the health and well-being of children.

== Child mortality in Uganda ==
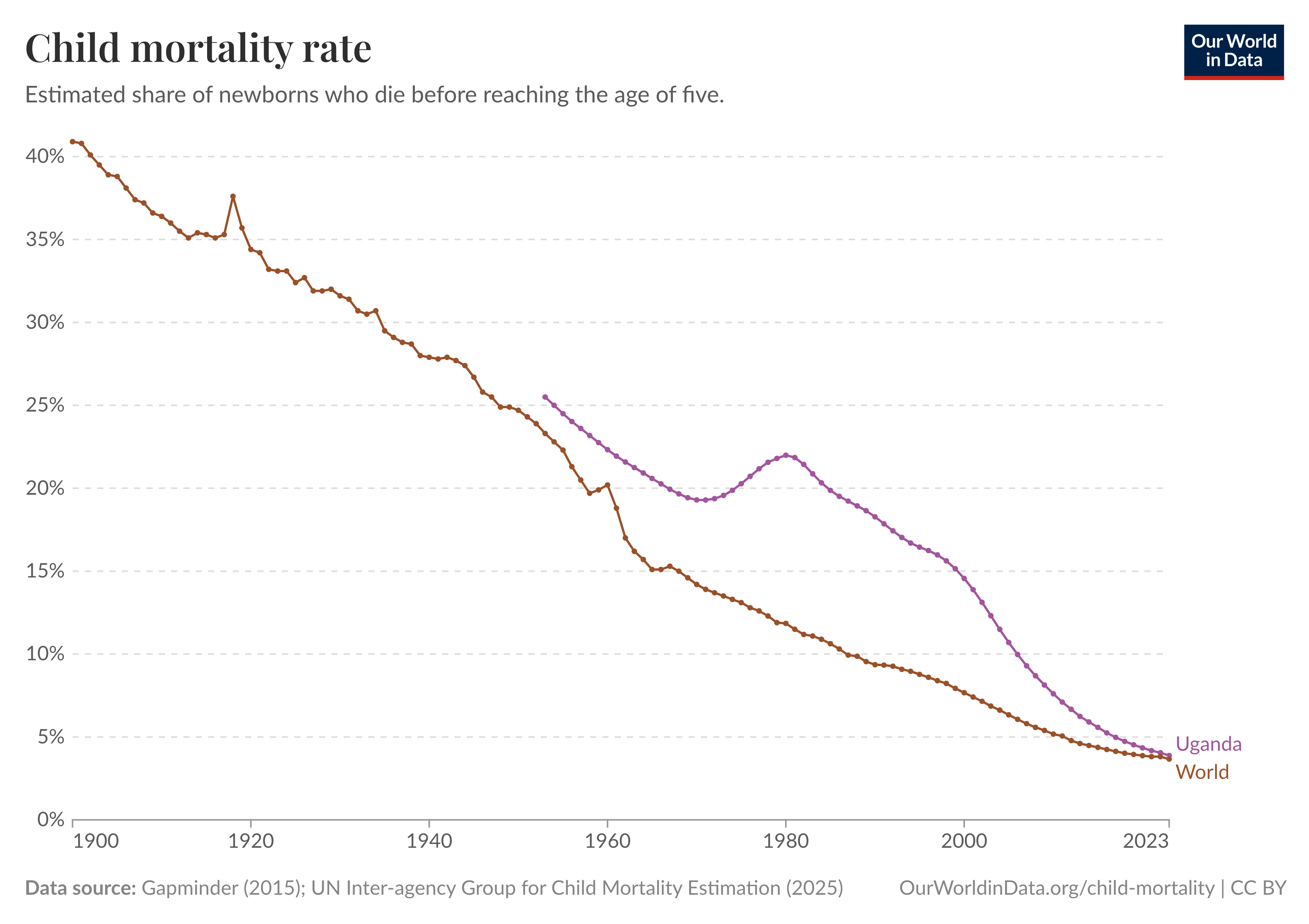
Trend of child-mortality rate in Uganda compared with the global average

Uganda has made notable progress towards reducing child mortality over the last three decades reflecting the overall improvements in child health and survival. The under-five mortality rate has steadily declined from 200 deaths per 1,000 live births in 1990 to 39 per 1,000 live births in 2023. Despite this decline, this figure remains above the global average of 37 per 1,000 live births and higher than the sustainable development goal (SDG) target 3.2 of 25 deaths per 1,000 live births. In 2023, the infant mortality rate was 28 deaths per 1,000 live births, compared to a global average of 27. Neonatal mortality rate was 18 per 1,000 live births, higher than both the global average (17) and the SDG target of 12 per 1,000 live births.

The leading causes of death among children under five in Uganda include malaria, neonatal asphyxia and trauma, preterm birth, congenital birth defects, and neonatal sepsis and infections. Malaria alone accounts for over 33,000 under-five deaths annually and remains a major contributor to child mortality and overall disability-adjusted life years (DALYs) in Uganda. Among neonates, birth asphyxia and trauma are the leading causes of death contributing to over 10,000 deaths per year highlighting the importance of improved birth care such as skilled birth attendance as part of the maternal and child morality interventions in Uganda.

Despite efforts by the ministry of health and other stakeholders to prevent and treat malaria, the disease continues to pose a heavy burden in Uganda, accounting for about 17% of all DALYs and 31% of DALYs among children under five in 2021. As such, the malaria vaccination program that started in 2025 in Uganda was a timely intervention to complement the broader malaria prevention strategy. The key risk factors for under-five mortality in Uganda include low birth weight, short gestation, child underweight, household air pollution, and malnutrition. While child mortality has declined across all socioeconomic groups, disparities remain. For instance, children in the poorest 20% of the household in Uganda experienced 49 deaths per 1,000 live births. Whereas, children in the richest 20% experienced 28 deaths per 1,000 live births. Thus, children from the poorest households are twice as likely to die before the age of five years compared to those from the wealthiest households, highlighting the health inequities linked to the socioeconomic status of the population in Uganda.

== HIV/AIDS ==
HIV/AIDS is likely the leading health risk facing Ugandan children; it affects many facets of their physical and mental health in a variety of ways. It is the leading cause of death in Uganda, as reported by the Centers for Disease Control and Prevention (CDC) in 2010.

The CDC has been fairly active in the country, working in cooperation with government organizations as well as a number of other partners. Their work has been on multiple fronts including door-to-door HIV counseling and testing. Despite these and many other efforts, there are poor rates of treatment of children. Of the 190,000 HIV-positive children in Uganda, only 35,500 received Antiretroviral medication (ARV). Uganda is not alone in this, in 21 high burden African countries, only 34% of eligible children receive ARVs, compared to 68% of adults.

In addition, many of the children that receive medication have been found to lack the necessary diligence in their drug therapy routine. Many children find the medication unpleasant and are not even aware of their HIV status. Part of this can be attributed to lapses in communication. For example, it is common practice not to inform children of their HIV status until they reach 13 years of age. Sexual lifestyles are typically frowned upon in Uganda, particularly for women, which contributes to a poor dissemination of sex-related health information.

Research has shown that efforts to improve health and awareness of parents and guardians, as well as the communities, of children with HIV/AIDS could be an effective way to improve treatment. Increased education and awareness can help with communication breakdowns and access to resources. These efforts can also help decrease mother-to-child transmissions.

It is estimated that 91,000 infants are born each year to HIV-positive women. Only 51.6% of these women receive any sort of mother-to-child HIV prevention and about 24% of all 110,000 new HIV infections in Uganda in 2009 were a result of mother-to-child transmission. A study published by the World Health Organization (WHO) found that antiretroviral therapy (ART) is a very effective management strategy, in terms of efficacy as well as cost, for prevention of mother-to-child transmissions. In addition, often material support for parents/guardians can be an effective strategy in improving care and treatment of children, including funding for food, clothing, and educational expenses.

To date, most of Uganda's policies to combat AIDS have focused on abstinence and fidelity, both preventative measures, while little action has been taken around youth education. The main tool of this strategy is the controversial ABC campaign (Abstinence, Be faithful, and use Condoms). While initially believed to be a successful approach, the effectiveness of this strategy is currently inconclusive as more recent studies have found that increased condom use and deaths have been responsible for the decreases in HIV infections. According to recent studies, Uganda has seen a decrease in the HIV prevalence in the country. There was a reduction among children from 27,660 in 2011 to 9,629 in 2013, which measured up to the National Priority Action Plan target for 2013, which was 10,000.

Adolescent girls are a group that is most severely impacted and most at risk compared to other groups of the population. Two-thirds of new HIV infections were found in this section of the population. The number of deaths decreased for children under 4 years old from 100,000 between 2000 and 2012, while the number of deaths in adolescent girls increased from below 50,000 to over 100,000 between 2000 and 2012(UNICEF, 2013). Studies have shown that children below 15 years old account for 11% of HIV cases. According to UNAIDS, HIV cases were lower among pregnant adolescents at 3% compared to older pregnant women at 4.9%, availability of anti-retroviral therapy was lower among adolescents at 94%, compared to older pregnant women at 99%.

Additionally, due to the fact that there is still 18% of HIV cases coming from mother-to-child transmissions, the World Health Organization has been efficiently sending out revised WHO guidelines to protect mothers and their babies and make certain that HIV-infected mothers and their children receive triple antiretroviral prophylaxis during labor, breastfeeding, and throughout the rest of life. HIV positive mothers with access to elimination of mother-to-child transmission (EMTCT) assistance has increased to 85% and thirty-three districts have full coverage now (UNICEF Uganda). On the other hand, pregnant women in four districts did not receive antiretroviral therapy and in only 29% of districts HIV infected women were given antiretroviral therapy. Overall, mother to child transmission treatment coverage has greatly increased, but there is still a significant amount of unmet need across the country for women and children.

== Malnutrition ==
Malnutrition plagues much of Uganda's youth. According to a study by the World Food Programme (WFP), roughly one-third of Ugandan children have stunting, a permanent condition resulting from lack of proper nutrition during the first 5 years of life. Consequences of this have been found to be very costly to the Ugandan government and economy, with estimated losses totaling at 899 million US dollar annually, or 5% of the country's GDP.

Stunting in children occurs when a child is severely malnourished which leads to the child being much shorter than the average height for their age. This condition happens over a long period of time where the child is deprived of proper nutrition and infections which also arise more easily in undernourished children. According to the World Health Organization, 23.8% were short for age and 6.9% were extremely stunted. Along with stunting, malnutrition also caused children to be underweight. According to the United States National Center for Health Statistics, 24.1% of children were underweight based on weight, age, and gender.

Kwashiorkor is a kind of protein-energy malnutrition that is caused by repeated infections, specifically diarrheal disease. According to pediatrics, Edema must be present in order for a nutritional deficit is classified as Kwashiorkor and only 3.8% of the total sample had Kwashiorkor. Another condition named Marasmus occurs in children when they experience critical undernourishment that causes their weight to be lower than the appropriate weight for their age. The widespread presence of low MUAC (mid-upper arm circumference) was also a health issue attributed to critical malnourishment. Children that had weighed too little for their height had a condition called wasting. Wasting is used as an evaluation of short-term malnourishment principally after an ailment occurred.

== Vaccinations ==
Vaccinations is a preventative method that can limit and terminate infectious diseases, which can eliminate the possibility of millions of deaths per year. It is a very cost-effective way to manage the overall health of a population. While many efforts are currently in place in Uganda to distribute vaccinations to children, it is still a very serious health concern. About 2 million deaths each year in Uganda are a result of vaccine preventable diseases. Tuberculosis is one example of these, which was found to be the 4th leading cause of death in Uganda in 2010 according to the CDC. In 2001, it was found that 63% of children less than one year old had either failed to complete their vaccination schedule or not had any vaccinations at all. A 2012 study found that vaccination rates can be improved by providing additional support to mothers to enable them to make use of immunization services.

Recently, Uganda has been improving and diligently working on the availability of vaccinations to children. The World Health Organization is supporting Uganda in its health and vaccination efforts along with the Global Vaccination Action Plan. According to the National Administrative Immunization Performance Analysis, 22 out of Uganda's 112 districts have a good availability and use of immunization services. The services help about 80% of the children. Despite the tremendous health efforts, the overall vaccination availability and access is poor. According to WHO, 22% and 18% of Ugandan children still do not have essential vaccines. Uganda has one of the highest rank for unimmunized children.

== Wood-burning stoves ==
Traditionally in Uganda, as in most developing countries, open word-burning stoves are commonly used for cooking and to heat homes. It has been estimated that 95% of Ugandans rely on wood or charcoal for cooking. Many women using these wood-burning stoves to cook are unaware of the severe health issues it can cause to them and their children. Fumes from the stove are dense in particles containing harmful gases such as sulfur dioxide, carbon dioxide, and various other harmful gases. These gases are harmful to the environment and to people inhaling the fumes. Inhaling such dangerous fumes can induce cancerous disease or even death.

In addition to inducing cancerous disease, the fumes from the stove can damage eyesight. After long-term use, the smoke degrades eyesight and causes visual impairments. Along with eyesight impairment, the smoke causes other illnesses such as chronic bronchitis, lung infections, asthma, cataract, low birth weight, and stillbirths. The chemical pollutants in smoke also induce dizziness and irritation to the respiratory system. According to the World Health Organization, there are over 200 different chemicals and compounds in wood smoke that are hazardous enough to damage human health. Many women and girls are utilizing the wood-burning stoves every day and are not aware of the harmful effects it is having and will have on their health. Pregnant women are inhaling fumes that are harmful to them and their unborn baby which can lead to birth defects.

=== Interventions ===
Many homes in Uganda still have inadequate ventilation stoves because they are unable to afford stoves with better ventilation. Women and girls need to be educated on how to efficiently cook and save themselves and the environment while still using the poorly ventilated stoves. The CECOD, a non-governmental organization in Uganda, has a purpose to create stoves that save energy and don't use a lot of wood which will reduce the deforestation. The CECOD has also created eco schools that educate students about the environment and how to save the environment. Students in these eco schools learn and bring what they learned home, which helps to spread the knowledge and further save the environment.

== Sanitary pads ==
One health issue facing female children specifically in Uganda as well as many other developing countries is the inability to afford sanitary pads. Besides the obvious health and sanitation concerns, this problem also often has harmful effects on education. Due to the fact that menstruation is not an openly discussed topic, many school girls have to suffer and are often distracted by the thought of soiling their clothes. On top of worrying about soiling their clothes, they are also worried about the embarrassment it can bring. Other children at school will laugh at them and ridicule them. That is part of the reason why some girls just don't go back to school because they can't handle the hassle of menstruation while focusing on schoolwork. Evaluations by the Kasiisi Project, a non-profit organization working in rural Western Uganda, found that girls will often skip school or drop out altogether as a result of menstruation and insufficient resources and facilities associated with it.

Their problem would be resolved if they were able to afford sanitary pads, but most are not. Most girls use rags and toilet paper while menstruating. According to research by Build Africa, 29.7% of girls said they missed at least four days per cycle, which included class presentations, exams, and new topics being taught. Another 24.3% of girls in the study said they were condemned whenever their uniform was soiled while on their period. Because of that many girls just decide to drop out. Menstruation is something that is kept quiet and many people, especially boys are not educated on what menstruation actually is. Some boys think it is an illness instead of a part of human nature for women. As a result of the worsening problem, about 24.7% of girls say their parents did not talk with them about menstruation and body changes they will go through as they get older. When discussing female health issues such as menstruation and puberty many girls only have senior women teachers at their school to talk to, which is a lot for the senior women alone to handle. So, young girls in Uganda are going through a really hard time with going through physical changes they do not understand while being ridiculed.

According to research by Build Africa, about 90% of girls say they use a rag to pad themselves. They hang the rags to dry them but take them down before anyone sees them because it is seen as an embarrassment. However, rags are sometimes taken down that are not fully dried and girls still wear them. Bacterial-blood infiltrated rags could lead to health issues in the future and vaginal infections. These girls get vaginal infections which can lead to reproductive issues in the future and even make some of them infertile.

== Road Map campaign ==
In 2008, Janet Museveni launched the Road Map campaign in an effort to coordinate efforts to lower maternal and neonatal death rates in Uganda. She created the Elimination of Mother-to-Child-Transmission of HIV Campaign in Moroto. This campaign was part of the government's efforts to prevent HIV from affecting future generations like how it has affected past generations. Part of the campaign is the promotion of ART (antiretroviral therapy) where all pregnant women with HIV are given antiretroviral therapy for life. Uganda was one of the first developing countries to offer life-saving treatment to people infected with HIV. According to UNAIDS, new infections among children decreased from 27,000 in 2009 to 15,000 in 2012, a 49% drop and the number of women with access to prevention of mother-to-child transmission of HIV assistance also increased at a fast rate from 45% in 2011 to 73% in 2012.

Through this campaign the Ugandan government has shown that Africans can have access to preventative treatment and that HIV/AIDS can be conquered. This campaign has also shown the motivation and effort put into having a new generation free from HIV.

== Malaria ==
The infectious disease called Malaria is induced by parasites that are spread to humans through mosquito bites, particularly female Anopheles mosquitoes. This infectious disease is parasitic and attacks red blood cells. It is the prime cause of death among children and pregnant women in Africa. Children and women infected with the disease have symptoms including chills, high fever, fatigue, headaches, nausea, shivering, and pain in limbs. If the person is infected with the disease over a long period of time they can contract anemia, jaundice, and low blood sugar. A person with a very strong strain of malaria can contract cerebral malaria and at its most critical state cerebral malaria can cause delirium or seizures and can lead to coma.

An outbreak of malaria occurs in certain regions for various reasons. Uninfected or partially infected people that move into a new area where malaria is widespread can cause an outbreak. Infected people moving into an area where malaria is not present but conditions permit the disease to thrive may also cause an outbreak. In situations where the mosquito carrying the disease is partly eliminated can cause a recurrence of the outbreak in that region. Young children and pregnant women are at a higher risk of contracting malaria due to the fact that they have a weaker immune system. Young children and pregnant women in rural areas with little knowledge of malaria, minimal financial and medical aid are also at a higher risk of developing malaria than other individuals.

Malaria is one of the leading causes of death among youth. Statistics portray that Uganda has the world's highest number of malaria cases. According to New Vision, the malaria incidence rate is 478 cases per 1,000 people per year. About 70,000 to 100,000 people are dying from the disease and about half are children under 5 years old. Malaria is a pandemic in the country because millions of children and women are dying every year from the disease. To add to the problem many do not have access to preventative treatments and many children do not have access to preventative mosquito nets or mosquito sprays. According to the World Health Organization, sub-Saharan Africa was the source of 88% of malaria cases and the source of 90% of deaths caused by malaria.

Preventative methods have been put into place but have not made a large impact and still need to be improved. Drug-resistant strains broke out and still have not been dealt with appropriately. Residual spraying inside homes and buildings has not widely impacted the country. Only small regions of the country are efficiently and effectively using this method, which in turn has allowed the disease to continue spreading. Mosquito nets that are provided are not strong enough, damaged easily, and some people don't know how to use them correctly.

=== Lack of malaria vaccine ===
Currently, there is no malaria vaccine. According to the World Health Organization, the complexity of the malaria parasite has made the creation of a malaria vaccine difficult. Malaria is caused by a variety of species of the Plasmodium protozoan and the virus of the antigens are always changing which is why creating a vaccine is so difficult. The easiest way to prevent malaria is to stay away from areas where malaria is present. In regions where mosquitoes are prevalent, it is essential to sleep under mosquito nets that are treated with insecticide. It is also essential to take prescription medication that will prevent a malaria infection. People can also prevent malaria just by wearing long sleeves and insect repellent.

== Healthcare workers ==
Among the multiple factors contributing to the poor health of children in Uganda, lack of healthcare workers is another factor adding to the problem. The healthcare workers that are absent most of the time are the highly trained doctors and clinical officers. According to IntraHealth, results from a recent study in Uganda show that healthcare workers are missing from their position 35% of the time. Only about half of nursing positions are occupied in public health facilities in Uganda. The critical lack of staffing of healthcare workers can create an absence of motivation and responsibility among healthcare workers that are filling positions. When workers are not satisfied, they are not motivated which can negatively impact the health of the community they are serving in. Poorly motivated healthcare workers are more prone to leave their jobs for better opportunities elsewhere, in a more developed country. In the situation that Uganda is in, they can not afford to lose any more of their healthcare workers.

Healthcare workers are absent for several reasons. They are absent because some are furthering education, sickness, problems with housing or transport, social obligations, and disaster-related issues. Another element adding to the absence of healthcare workers is that they are not being held accountable by their supervisors. IntraHealth researchers did a study on the reason healthcare workers are absent most of the time. They interviewed several supervisors in public health facilities. They asked interviewees if there was a government policy on being absent and 33% said no, although there is a human resource policy that governs employees across the entire government. 11% of interviewees said they did not monitor staff coming and going and 14% said they did not use a reporting book. Supervisors were also asked another question whether or not they are included in decisions permitting their staff to be absent for extended periods of time, and 12% said no. So, the lack of accountability and motivation is a major contributing factor in the absenteeism of many healthcare workers in Uganda.

The accountability of healthcare workers needs to be maintained as well as the motivation of the workers. Accountability can be maintained by keeping track of all workers and ensuring they are working when they are supposed to be working and giving punishment for any workers that are out of work without approval from their supervisor. Motivation can be maintained by a positive relationship with supervisors and co-workers, sufficient career progression, sufficient compensation, and satisfactory working environment.

To address this issue, health teams from 19 Ugandan districts are taking the Human Resources for Health (HRH) Leadership and Management Course, which is being conducted by the USAID-funded Uganda Capacity Program. The course proved itself to increase motivation among the medical teams.

== Drug shortage ==
There is a shortage of essential drugs in Uganda that are needed to treat the most prevalent diseases among children in the country. According to Uganda Country Working Group, 32–50% of vital medications to treat the most common disease such as malaria, HIV/AIDS, pneumonia, TB, diabetes, diarrhea, and hypertension are not easily accessible. This crisis is occurring because a serious stockout is occurring in hospitals and clinics. There was a national stockout for a drug called Coartem which is the drug used to treat malaria. Due to this national stockout, malaria was being medicated with quinine but quinine was not available so caretakers had to break the adult tablet into smaller pieces and in other cases where the adult dosage was unavailable, adults were given the child dosage. Some patients across the country are forced to travel far distances to other hospitals and clinics where drugs are still inaccessible, taking alternative treatments, or just waiting at home to die. According to doctors, the drug shortage could lead to treatment failure and resistance to drugs.

The drug stockouts severely impact 31.1% of Ugandans who live on just a dollar a day, as they are forced to pay significantly higher prices for medications at private hospitals and clinics. Many of these individuals, struggling to survive on such limited income, cannot afford these expensive treatments and are left with no choice but to go without, which often leads to fatal outcomes. Medication is usually one of the largest health expenses for people in developing countries and the stockouts only added to the severity of the problem.

According to a survey done by the Uganda Country Working Group, the accessibility of Coartem, was 28% in the private sector, drugs for children were constantly below 30% in the private sector, Amoxillin delay was 13%, and Cotrimoxazole (Septrin) delay was 29% which is the medication for upper respiratory tract infection, leading cause of death in children. Anti-diabetic medications were less than 50% in the public sector and hypertension medications were also less than 50% in public hospitals and clinics.

=== Reasons for drug shortage ===
Drug shortage is the result of medication theft, corrupt government and lack of prioritization. The constant low accessibility of essential child medications such as hypertension and diabetics portrays a lack of prioritization for child health in the country. The lack of prioritization and availability of vital medications is increasing the health epidemic in Uganda among children. The National Medical Store of Uganda is not the only supplier of drugs in the country and they only supply 30%–40% of drugs. The rest of the drugs are bought by the government. This shows that the widespread stockout of drugs has to be from misconduct among the government, which is the main distributor of drugs across the country. The main reason for drug shortages are the corrupt government not buying drugs and using the money for other purposes or selling drugs to private hospitals and clinics.

Another significant factor contributing to the drug shortage is the theft of medications. Additionally, some districts delay submitting their medication orders. However, the National Medical Store follows a specific schedule for deliveries to different regions. If a district delays its order, it must wait until the next scheduled delivery to receive the medications.

== See also ==
- Maternal health in Uganda
