= Capital Markets Authority of Uganda =

Ugandan government body responsible for financial regulation

Agency overview
- Formed: 1996
- Jurisdiction: Uganda
- Headquarters: Kampala, Uganda
- Employees: 40 (2025)
- Agency executives: Saul Sseremba, chairman; Josephine Okui Ossiya, chief executive officer
- Website: www.cmauganda.co.ug

The Capital Markets Authority of Uganda (CMA) is a semi-autonomous government body responsible for the financial regulation of the capital markets industry in Uganda.

== Overview ==
The CMA approves the offers of all securities to the public and licenses market professionals like broker-dealers, investment advisers, and fund managers. It licenses stock exchanges but has so far issued licences only to the Uganda Securities Exchange and ALTX East Africa Securities Exchange. Its overall objectives are market regulation and investor protection.

== Mandate ==
- The development of all aspects of the capital markets with particular emphasis on the removal of impediments to, and the creation of incentives, for longer-term investments in productive enterprises.
- The creation, maintenance, and regulation, through implementation of a system in which market participants are self-regulatory to the maximum practicable extent, of a market in which securities can be issued and traded in an orderly, fair, and efficient manner.
- The protection of investor interests.
- The operation of an Investor Compensation Fund.
- The licensing of brokers and other financial industry professionals.

== See also ==
- Ministry of Finance, Planning and Economic Development (Uganda)
- Uganda Investment Authority
- Economy of Uganda
- List of financial supervisory authorities by country
