= Domestic violence in Uganda =

Domestic violence in Uganda is a problem as it is in many parts of Africa.

There is a deep cultural belief in Uganda that it is socially acceptable to hit a woman to discipline her.

Wife beating costs the Ugandan economy billions of shillings per year.

== Prevalence ==
From the 2016-2022, national report, about 56% of the Ugandan women aged between 15 and 49 years have experienced physical violence, while 22% have faced sexual violence. In 2016, 22.3% physical violence cases, 16.6% sexual cases were reported (UNIPH, UNFPA Uganda). Bukedi sub-region registered the highest percentage of physical violence with 32.6% and sexual violence with 37.1% whereas Ankole registered the highest percentage in emotional violence with 48.6% (UDHS 2016, UBOS). The year of 2020 likely saw about 29% increase in domestic violence cases with 17,664 cases reported, up rom 13,693 in 2019. In 2021, 272,737 Gender-based violence cases were reported (police, 2016-2021 total).

A 2000-2001 survey in Rakai District observed that, compared to men, women viewed physical violence against a female partner as justified more often, whether due to refusal to have sex (16% vs 28%), use of birth control without prior agreement (22% vs 27%), or infidelity (60% vs. 87%).

The 2023 Uganda Police annual crime report recorded 14, 846 cases of sex-related violence of these 10,792 victims were female adults compared to 3,243 male adults, 10,741 child related offences reflecting both the persistence of Gender-Based Violence and its devastating reach. The report also notes that 249 people were killed as a result of domestic violence (113 females adults and 95 male adults). According to the Forum of Women in Democracy, approximately 33% of households in Uganda are experiencing GBV. Another Natural survey by UN Women reports that 56% of the married women between ages of 15 and 30 have suffered violence in the hands of their partners.

Despite the high report volumes recorded, only 1,520 cases reached the courts resulting into just 423 convictions.

== History ==
In September 2009, the Domestic Violence Act which outlines increased relief efforts for victims of domestic violence, punitive measure for offenders, and changes to protection order grants, was presented to the Parliament of Uganda. It was passed into law on 13 March 2010. In 2016, the National Policy on the Elimination of Gender-Based Violence predicated the National Action Plan on Elimination of Gender Based Violence in Uganda, to be implemented in full by 2020, to address better handling domestic violence by national authorities and minimise its spread.

== See also ==
- Women in Uganda
