= Christopher George Frederick Frampton Melmoth =

Ugandan politician

Christopher George Frederick Frampton Melmoth was a Ugandan politician and educator who served as the Minister of Finance of Uganda from 1956 to 1961 and then again from March 1962 to April 1962. He was the first Minister of Finance in Uganda's independence era. He was succeeded by Lawrence Sebalu who served from July 1961 to March 1962.

== Life and career ==
Melmoth was born in Uganda during the British colonial era. His political career began in the 1950s, during the transition period from British colonial rule to independence. He was appointed Minister of Finance in 1956, a position he held until 1961. During his tenure, he played a key role in shaping Uganda's economic policy and preparing the country for independence. After a brief period out of office, he was re-appointed Minister of Finance in March 1962, serving for a second time until April 1962.
