= Jack Sentongo =

Ugandan politician

Personal details
- Citizenship: Uganda
- Party: National Resistance Movement
- Portfolio: Minister of Finance

Jack A.P.M. Sentongo was a Ugandan politician and elected official. He was Uganda's minister of finance from June 1979 until May 1980.
