= Women in Uganda =

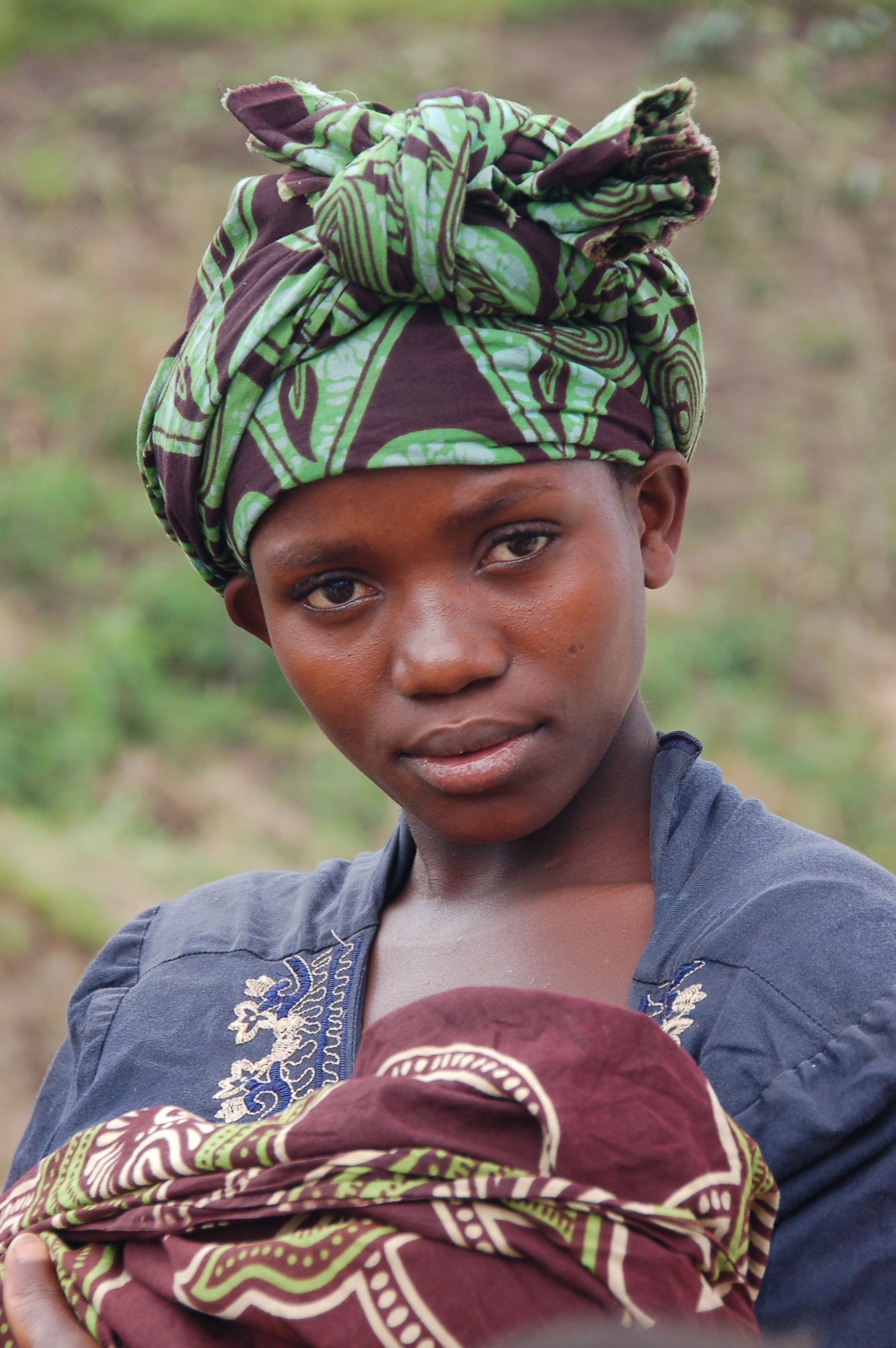
- Young woman in the Ruwenzori Range, Uganda

General statistics
- Maternal mortality (per 100,000): 310 (2010)
- Women in parliament: 35.0% (2012)
- Women over 25 with secondary education: 23.0% (2010)
- Women in labour force: 76.0% (2011)

Gender Inequality Index
- Value: 0.530 (2021)
- Rank: 131st out of 191

Global Gender Gap Index
- Value: 0.717 (2021)
- Rank: 66th out of 156

Women in Uganda have substantial economic and social responsibilities throughout Uganda's many traditional societies. Ugandan women come from a range of economic and educational backgrounds. Despite economic and social progress throughout the country, domestic violence and sexual assault remain prevalent issues in Uganda. Illiteracy is directly correlated to increased level of domestic violence. This is mainly because household members can not make proper decisions that directly affect their future plans. Government reports suggest rising levels of domestic violence toward women that are directly attributable to poverty.

== Social dynamics ==
Today gender roles in Uganda are influenced by tradition as well as constantly changing social dynamics. Traditional roles of women in Uganda are similar to traditional roles of women around the world. These roles are largely domestic including housekeeping, child rearing, fetching water, cooking, and tending to community needs.

In the 1980s, some women in rural areas of Buganda were expected to kneel when speaking to a man. At the same time, however, women shouldered the primary responsibilities for childcare and subsistence cultivation, and in the twentieth century, women had made substantial contributions to cash-crop agriculture.

While it has traditionally been the role of men to control familial financial matters, women provide substantial economic contributions to their families and to the larger Ugandan economy. Many women report they continue to struggle to find employment opportunities and some leave their communities to find greater employment opportunities elsewhere. Traditional gender roles that have been largely revitalized by US evangelical influence, assert the role of women as based in domestic responsibilities. Therefore, female employment continues to be stigmatized within Ugandan culture. However, there have been greater initiatives to generate women's employment around the country.

In many respects, Ugandan women hold and have held rights that exceeded those of women in Western societies. Many Ugandans recognize women as important religious and community leaders. Women have held rights to own land, influence crucial political decisions made by men, and cultivate crops for their own profit. When cash-crop agriculture became lucrative, as in southeastern Uganda in the 1920s, men often claimed rights to land owned by their female relatives, and their claims were supported by local councils and protectorate courts.

=== Polygamy ===
Polygynous marriage practices, which permit a man to marry more than one woman, have reinforced some aspects of male dominance. However, they also have given women an arena for cooperating to oppose male dominance.

In Uganda, a man sometimes grants "male status" to his senior wife, allowing her to behave as an equal toward men and as a superior toward his other wives. In the twentieth century, polygynous marriages represented social bonds that were not legally recognized as marriage, leaving women without legal rights to inheritance or maintenance in the event of divorce or widowhood.

== Gender equality ==
As with many other countries, Uganda faces multiple obstacles in its movement toward gender equality. After gender equality and women empowerment was listed as one of the UN Millennium Development Goals of 2000, the Ugandan Justice, Law and Order Sector (JLOS) responded in their Gender and Access to Justice (2001) annual report addressing various obstacles in accessing justice. In 2012, the JLOS reported that because of patriarchy and the lack of gender equality, the majority of the poor are women; many of which are ignorant of or deprived of certain rights like owning land.

Gender-based violence has been reported as another issue. According to authorities within the Ugandan Police Force, many Ugandans accept the battering of women as a long-standing social norm. In 2001, a survey revealed that 90% of women reported that "beating a wife or female partner was justifiable in some circumstances." A 2018 Reuters article highlighted the concern over gender based violence in covering a story involving 20 corpses of young women along the roadsides south of the Kampala. In addition to the lack of justice and protection against violence, there is a significant gender gap with education.

Women are under-represented in Ugandan financial services: women control around 39 percent of Ugandan firms, yet they receive just 9 percent of commercial loans. They are 40% less likely to hold a bank account than males. In addition, just 25% of women utilise mobile money.

Uganda's National Financial Inclusion Strategy seeks to address this, with the Uganda Development Bank (UDBL) leading the way. The European Investment Bank provided them with a €15 million loan line as part of the East Africa SME-focused Regional Facility and the organisation's SheInvest for Africa project.

Uganda's National Financial Inclusion Strategy is now focusing especially on female-led private enterprise through a new project dubbed the 2X Challenge. The 2X Challenge is a pledge by development finance institutions to invest $3 billion in women's economic empowerment by the end of 2020. The project's purpose is to promote women as entrepreneurs, business leaders, and workers.

Agriculture and agribusiness have the most women-led firms in Uganda Development Bank's portfolio.

=== The gender gap and education ===
According to the World Economic Forum's Global Gender Gap 2017 Report, Uganda is ranked 45 out of 144 countries on the basis of its four key indicators: Economic Participation and Opportunity, Educational Attainment, Health and Survival, and Political Empowerment. Under the country score card section of this report, it revealed that Uganda ranked #1 in primary education enrollment and yet only #127 in secondary education. This means that for the majority of girls in Uganda, their schooling is halted before or soon after becoming a teenager. The cultural practice of parents relying heavier on girls more than boys for household labor needs may be a main cause for this disparity in education.

A 2013 study done by Martina Björkman-Nyqvist indicated a sharp drop in school enrollment for females when their households faced financial setbacks from a lack of rain/crop production or other economic shortfalls. And in the districts where schooling was free, it showed a significant drop in the marks earned by female students during the times of economic hardship. Meanwhile, the study showed that boys remained unscathed in either scenario. Whether it is economic shocks, early unwanted pregnancies or fleeing family violence, many girls have to stop their education prematurely. As a result, these young women face reduced opportunities for work and a significant amount of them are driven into unhealthy sexual relationships or find themselves doing sex work in Kampala to survive and support their families.

=== Interventions for gender equality ===
Actions taken to bridge these gender gaps and bring justice have served as a catalyst for development, empowering Ugandan woman to lay hold of various rights, positions and opportunities. In Kasese District, Western Uganda, the Gender Action Learning System (GALS) provides training in the production and trade of the nation's staples: coffee, maize and fruit. Through initiatives like this, women are positioned to access needed healthcare and education, thus helping them escape the poverty trap. Research findings also indicate a decline in gender-based violence as women become key contributors in bolstering local economies.

An IMF 2016 survey found its gender budgeting very successful in Sub-Sahara countries like Uganda and Rwanda. When targeted funds provide clean water and electricity is accessible, the reduction of daily household chores makes it more feasible to earn the monies needed for a girl's education. Through education and couple counseling programs within The AIDS Support Organization (TASO), women learn assertiveness skills that help them better navigate relational choices and safe sex practices. Clubs such as the Empowerment of Livelihood and Adolescents (ELA) have the goal of helping girls evade teen pregnancy and underage marriage.

=== Resistance to changing norms ===
The changing of age old social norms have been met with some resistance and negative repercussion. After public campaigns promoting women's rights, Uganda has been one of the countries noted by the World Health Organization to experience backlash resulting in violence. In a four-year study in Rakai, Uganda noted widespread uneasiness among both women and men as equality initiatives challenged the concept of a women's place in the home and society in general. With women gaining more financial autonomy and power in the home, many reported a concern that this challenge to traditional gender roles may cause men to feel threatened and respond with domestic violence. The Rakai study stressed the importance of having community initiatives in place that can broaden cultural understandings in recognizing that there are many benefits as women empowerment and equality is embraced.

== History ==
Women began to organize to exercise their political power before independence. In 1960 the Uganda Council of Women led by Edith Mary Bataringaya passed a resolution urging that laws regarding marriage, divorce, and inheritance should be recorded in written form and publicized nationwide—a first step toward codifying customary and modern practices. During the first decade of independence, this council also pressed for legal reforms that would grant all women the right to own property and retain custody of their children if their marriages ended.

During the 1970s and early 1980s, the violence that swept Uganda inflicted a particularly heavy toll on women. Economic hardships were felt first in the home, where women and children lacked economic choices available to most men. Women's work became more time-consuming than it had been; the erosion of public services and infrastructure reduced access to schools, hospitals, and markets. Even traveling to nearby towns was often impossible. Some Ugandan women believed that the war years strengthened their independence, however, as the disruption of normal family life opened new avenues for acquiring economic independence, and government reports suggested that the number of women employed in commerce increased in the late 1970s and early 1980s.

The Museveni government of the late 1980s pledged to eliminate discrimination against women in official policy and practice. Women are active in the National Resistance Army (NRA), and Museveni appointed a woman, Joan Kakwenzire, to a six-member commission to document abuses by the military. The government also has decreed that one woman would represent each district on the National Resistance Council. In addition, the government-operated Uganda Commercial Bank has launched a rural credit plan to make farm loans more easily available to women.

Museveni appointed Joyce Mpanga minister for women and development in 1987, and she proclaimed the government's intention to raise women's wages, increase women's credit and employment opportunities, and improve the lives of women in general. In 1989 there were two women serving as ministers and three serving as deputy ministers in the NRM cabinet. Women civil servants and professionals also formed an organization, Action for Development, to assist women in war-torn areas, especially the devastated Luwero region in central Uganda.

The Uganda Association of Women Lawyers, which was founded in 1976, established a legal-aid clinic in early 1988 to defend women who faced the loss of property or children because of divorce, separation, or widowhood. The association also sought to expand educational opportunities for women, increase child support payments (equivalent to US$0.50 per month in 1989) in case of divorce, establish common legal grounds for divorce for both men and women, establish common criminal codes for men and women, assist women and children who were victims of AIDS, and implement nationwide education programs to inform women of their legal rights.

== See also ==
- Domestic violence in Uganda
- Maternal health in Uganda
- Women in Africa
