= Lawrence Kiiza =

Ugandan politician

Ministry of Finance, Planning and Economic Development
- Appointed by: Yoweri Museveni

Chairman of Uganda Investment Authority

Personal details
- Born: Kampala, Uganda
- Occupation: Politician

Lawrence Kiiza is a Ugandan politician and businessman who is the current minister of Ministry of Finance, Planning and Economic Development. He also served as the chairman of Uganda Investment Authority. He was the Minister of Commerce, Industry, and Tourism of Uganda in 1996, as well as the Minister of State for Industry and Technology. He later served as the Director of Uganda Development Bank.

== Background ==
=== Early life and career ===
Kiiza was born in 1948 in the Western Region of Uganda. He was born in a family that was involved in farming and business. He began his political career in the 1980s, serving as a Member of Parliament for the Bushenyi District. He later became the Minister of State for Finance, Planning, and Economic Development, and then Minister of State for Industry and Technology. In 1996, he was appointed Minister of Commerce, Industry, and Tourism.He has also been a strong advocate for private sector growth and entrepreneurship.

=== Education ===
Kiiza holds a Bachelor's degree in Economics from Makerere University and a Master's degree in Business Administration from the University of Manchester.

== Allegations ==
Kiiza has faced allegations of corruption and embezzlement during his political career, particularly during his tenure as Minister of Commerce, Industry, and Tourism. However, he has consistently denied any wrongdoing.

== Legacy ==
Kiiza's contributions to Uganda's economic development are notable, particularly in the areas of trade and industry. Despite facing allegations of corruption, he remains a respected figure in Ugandan politics and business.
