= Kakwenza Rukirabashaija =

Ugandan Lawyer and novelist (born 1968)

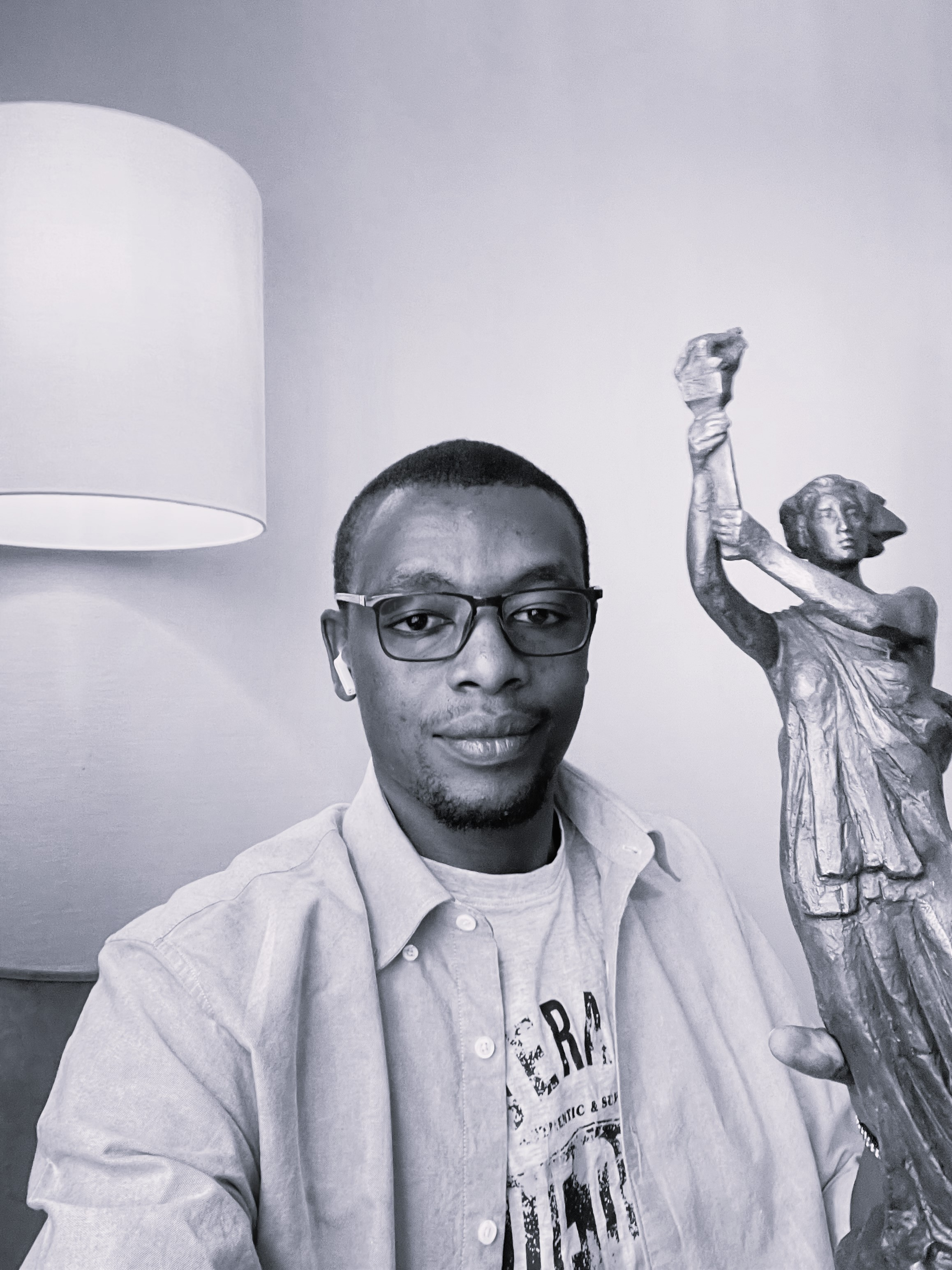
- Kakwenza Rukirabashaija with his Havel Prize
- Born: Kakwenza Rukirabashaija; 1 October 1988 (age 37); Rukungiri District, Uganda
- Education: Kyambogo University (Bachelor of Development Studies); University of Cape Town (Master of Journalism); Cavendish University Uganda (Bachelor of Laws); European University Viadrina (Master of Laws)
- Occupations: Lawyer and Novelist
- Writing career
- Genres: Fiction, satire
- Notable works: The Greedy Barbarian (2020); Banana Republic: Where Writing is Treasonous (2020); The Savage Avenger (2023)
- Notable awards: English PEN International Writer of Courage Award 2021; 2022 Nominee for Disturbing the Peace Award; 2023 Václav Havel International Prize

Kakwenza Rukirabashaija (born 1 October 1988) is a Ugandan novelist and lawyer. He is the author of The Greedy Barbarian The Savage Avenger and Banana Republic : Where Writing is Treasonous. He was named winner of the English PEN 2021 Pinter International Writer of Courage Award.

== Early life and education ==
Kakwenza was born on 1 October 1988 in Rukungiri District, South Western Uganda. He studied at several primary schools in the same district. He attended Kyamakanda Secondary School, Makobore High School and Kigezi College Butobere for O'level. He later joined Muyenga High School in Kampala for A'level. He graduated with a bachelor's degree of Laws from Cavendish University Uganda, degree in development studies from Kyambogo University, a master's degree in journalism from the University of Cape Town and a master of laws from Europa Universität Viadrina.

== Life ==
On 13 April 2020, Kakwenza was arrested by security operatives from his home in Iganga and detained for publishing his first book The Greedy Barbarian which they believed was about the person of President Yoweri Museveni.

He was arrested again on 18 September 2020 after writing another novel, narrating his ordeal in the hands of his captors. The book is titled Banana Republic: Where Writing is Treasonous.

In February 2021, Kakwenza sued the Government of Uganda for the torture he suffered at the hands of Chieftaincy of Military Intelligence (CMI) security operatives.

On 28 December 2021 Ugandan security forces arrested Kakwenza after he had insulted Muhoozi on Twitter calling him obese and ridiculed his military training. The arrest was condemned by opposition leader Bobi Wine and PEN International. On 4 January 2022, a Ugandan court called for his release. He was released for a brief home visit under armed guard that day. He showed visible signs of torture from the Ugandan police, including bloodstains on his clothing, which was removed by Kakwenza and kept by his wife. Pictures of his blood-stained clothing were uploaded to Twitter by Kiiza Eron, a Ugandan human rights lawyer. Although the Judicial courts had retained his passport asserting that the premises for his request to vacate the country were weak, Kakwenza fled Uganda to neighbouring Rwanda in February 2022 fearing for his life. He arrived in Germany on 24 February 2022.

== Awards ==
- 2021 PEN Pinter Prize International Writer of Courage.
- 2021 English PEN International Writer of Courage Award.
- 2022 Nominee for Disturbing the Peace Award.
- 2023 Václav Havel International Prize for Creative Dissent: Nicaraguan political cartoonist by The Human Rights Foundation (HRF).
- 2019 Maria Moors Cabot Prize, awarded by Columbia University.
- 2019 recognition by the Americas Quarterly as one of its Top 5 Latin American political humorists.

== Publications ==
- The Greedy Barbarian, self-published, 2020. theworldiswatching, 2023. ISBN 9783982513201.
- Banana Republic: Where Writing is Treasonous, Kisana Consults, [Uganda], 2020. ISBN 9789970743049.
- The Savage Avenger, theworldiswatching, 2023. ISBN 9783982513225
