= Michael Mugabi =

Ugandan lawyer and banker

- Born: Uganda
- Citizenship: Uganda
- Education: Makerere University (Bachelor of Laws); Law Development Centre (Diploma in Legal Practice); Institute of Chartered Secretaries and Administrators (Fellow of the Institute of Chartered Secretaries and Administrators); University of London (Master of Laws)
- Occupations: Lawyer, Businessman, Banker, Corporate Executive
- Years active: 1996 — present
- Known for: Leadership, Banking expertise
- Title: Managing Director & CEO of Housing Finance Bank

Michael Karokora Mugabi, is a Ugandan lawyer and corporate executive, who serves as the managing director and chief executive officer of Housing Finance Bank (HFB), a commercial and mortgage bank headquartered in Kampala, Uganda's capital city. The bank is co-owned by the Uganda National Social Security Fund and the Uganda Ministry of Finance, Planning and Economic Development.

== Early life and education ==
Following the completion of his high school education, he was admitted to Makerere University, the oldest and largest public university in Uganda. He graduated with a Bachelor of Laws degree. He followed that with a Diploma in Legal Practice, obtained from the Law Development Centre, in Kampala, Uganda's capital city. He was then admitted to the Uganda Bar as a practicing attorney.

His degree of Master of Laws in commercial and corporate law, was obtained from the University of London. He is also a Fellow of the Institute of Chartered Secretaries and Administrators (ICSA).

== Career ==
Prior to his present position, Mugabi was an executive director at Housing Finance Bank. He served as director of operations at the bank. Before that, he was the Company Secretary and Head of Legal services at the institution. He also previously served as Head Human Resources at HFB. He was appointed in Acting Capacity, and then in complete capacity to replace Mathias Katamba, who resigned to assume the position of chief executive officer at DFCU Bank. Housing Finance Bank is the largest mortgage lender in the country, accounting for about 60 percent of all mortgage loans.

== See also ==
- Juma Kisaame
- Patrick Ayota
- Patrick Mweheire
