= Anne Abeja Muhwezi =

Ugandan lawyer and corporate executive

- Born: Anne Abeja; 1977 (age 48–49); Uganda
- Education: Makerere University (LLB); Law Development Centre (Diploma in Legal Practice); Institute of Chartered Secretaries and Administrators (Chartered Secretary); Eastern and Southern African Management Institute (MBA)
- Occupations: Lawyer; company secretary
- Years active: 2005–present
- Known for: Legal Matters
- Title: Company Secretary & Head of Legal Department at Housing Finance Bank
- Spouse: Divorced

Anne Abeja (née Anne Abeja; born 1977), is a Ugandan lawyer and corporate executive, who, since October 2013, serves as the Company Secretary and head of the legal department at Housing Finance Bank, a Ugandan retail commercial bank.

Prior to assuming her current position in 2013, she served, for nearly nine years, as the company secretary of Monitor Publications, the publishers of the Daily Monitor newspaper in Uganda.

== Education ==
She holds a Bachelor of Laws from Makerere University, in Kampala, Uganda's capital and largest city. She also holds a Diploma in Legal Practice, obtained from the Law Development Centre, also in Kampala. She is a member of the legal bar in Uganda.

She is a qualified Chartered Secretary and also holds a Master of Business Administration, awarded by the Eastern and Southern African Management Institute.

== Career ==
From January 2005 until October 2013, she served as the Company Secretary at Monitor Publications. She was the company's legal representative in February 2010, when Angelo Izama, a senior reporter, and Henry Ochieng, editor of the Sunday Monitor news magazine, were sued by the government of Uganda, alleging that the duo had defamed the president of Uganda.

In October 2013, she was hired by Housing Finance Bank, Uganda's largest mortgage lender as the Head of Legal & Compliance Department and Company Secretary. She still serves in that position as of May 2026.

== Other considerations ==
In her capacity as Company Secretary, she sits on the Board of Directors of Housing Finance Bank, in Uganda. She engages in sporting activities and has won competitions in badminton, lawn tennis and pool.

She is also a member of the East African Law Society serving in different capacities including: 2006-2008 EALS Council Member, 2008-2010 Deputy Secretary General, 2010-2012 Secretary General and 2016-2018 Vice President-Regional Integration.

== See also ==
- Peninnah Kasule
- Sarah Walusimbi
- Agnes Tibayeyita Isharaza
