= Agnes Tibayeita Isharaza =

Ugandan lawyer and corporate executive

- Born: Uganda
- Citizenship: Uganda
- Education: Makerere University (Bachelor of Laws); Law Development Centre (Diploma in Legal Practice); Eastern and Southern African Management Institute (Master of Business Administration)
- Occupation: Lawyer
- Years active: 2003–present
- Known for: Legal matters
- Title: Company Secretary and Head of Legal Affairs at Uganda National Social Security Fund

Agnes Tibayeita Isharaza, is a Ugandan lawyer and corporate executive, who is the Company Secretary and Head of Legal Affairs at Uganda National Social Security Fund, effective 1 April 2019.

== Early life and education ==
She was born in Uganda and attended local primary and secondary schools. Her first degree, a Bachelor of Laws, was obtained from Makerere University, the oldest and largest public university in Uganda. She went on to obtain the Diploma in Legal Practice, from the Law Development Centre, in Kampala, the capital and largest city in the country. Her second degree, a Master of Business Administration, was awarded by the Eastern and Southern African Management Institute.

She has also undergone training in corporate and board governance from the Institute of Directors in Southern Africa and the Financial Times Non-Executive Directors Club, in the United Kingdom.

== Career ==
She has a 16-year experience in corporate governance issues, as of March 2019. Before her present position, she was the Company Secretary and head of legal affairs at DFCU Bank, the second-largest commercial bank in Uganda, with USh303 billion (US$822 million) in assets, as of 31 December 2017. While there, she was a member of the board of directors. At NSSF, she replaced Richard Wejuli Wabwire, who in February 2018, was appointed a judge of the High Court of Uganda.

== Other considerations ==
At DFCU, she was a member of dfcu's executive committee. Until 2014, she concurrently held the position of corporation secretary, at dfcu Limited, the holding company of DFCU Bank. From 2011 until 2017, she was a member of the board of directors at Capital Markets Authority of Uganda, representing the Uganda Bankers Association. While there, she chaired the legal and regulatory affairs committee.

In 2017, she was listed on the General Counsel Africa Power List by Legal 500. Also in 2017, she was nominated for the Women in Law Awards, in the Best Female Corporate Lawyer (Corporations) category and emerged in the top three.

== See also ==
- Sarah Walusimbi
- Anne Abeja Muhwezi
