= Peninnah Kasule =

Ugandan lawyer

- Born: Uganda
- Citizenship: Uganda
- Education: Makerere University (Bachelor of Laws); Law Development Centre (Postgraduate Diploma in Legal Practice); Institute of Chartered Secretaries and Administrators (Fellow of the Institute of Chartered Secretaries and Administrators)
- Occupations: Lawyer, Businesswoman, Corporate Executive
- Years active: 1996 — present
- Known for: Leadership, Legal expertise
- Title: Company Secretary and Head of Legal & Board Affairs at Centenary Bank

Peninnah Tibagwa Kasule, is a Ugandan lawyer and corporate executive, who serves as the Company Secretary and Head of Legal & Board Affairs at Centenary Rural Development Bank. In that role, she is a member of the bank's senior management team.

== Early life and education ==
She was born in the Western Region of Uganda. She attended Gayaza High School, an all-girls boarding secondary school in Wakiso District, where she obtained her High School Diploma.

She holds a Bachelor of Laws degree and a Postgraduate Diploma in Legal Practice. She is a member of the Uganda Bar. She is also a Fellow of the Institute of Chartered Secretaries and Administrators (ICSA).

== Career ==
Her duties at Centenary Bank include being the head of Compliance at the bank. As of 2018, her career spanned over 20 years. Prior to her present position, she worked as Company Secretary at United Assurance Company Limited, now part of the Ugandan subsidiaries of UAP Old Mutual Holdings.

== Other considerations ==
She is the chairperson of the five-person board of trustees of Send a Cow Uganda, the local affiliate of the African Development Charity, Send a Cow.

== See also ==
- Sarah Walusimbi
- Anne Abeja Muhwezi
- Agnes Tibayeyita Isharaza
