= Patience Tumusiime Rubagumya =

Justice of the High Court of Uganda

- Born: 1 January 1978 (age 48); Uganda
- Citizenship: Uganda
- Education: Makerere University (Bachelor of Laws); Law Development Centre (Diploma in Legal Practice); Robert Gordon University (Master of Laws in Oil and Gas); Uganda Revenue Authority Training School (Postgraduate Diploma in Taxation and Revenue Administration); Institute of Chartered Secretaries and Administrators (Fellow of the Institute of Chartered Secretaries and Administrators)
- Known for: Legal matters
- Title: Commissioner for Legal Services and Board Affairs at Uganda Revenue Authority

Patience Emily Tumusiime Rubagumya, (née Patience Tumusiime), is a Ugandan lawyer who was appointed as a judge to the High Court of Uganda in July 2023. Her first deployment on the bench was to the Commercial Division of the High Court.

Before that, from November 2022 until July 2023 she served as the Corporation Secretary and Head of Legal Affairs at Uganda Airlines, the country's national carrier.

Before that, from February 2015 until November 2022, she was the Commissioner for Legal Services and Board Affairs at Uganda Revenue Authority (URA), Uganda's revenue collection agency. She was appointed to that position on 1 February 2015, replacing Doris Akol, who was appointed Commissioner General of the URA. Rubagumya also doubled as the Company Secretary at the tax agency.

== Background and education ==
She was born in Uganda and attended local elementary and secondary schools. She holds a Bachelor of Laws degree, awarded by Makerere University, Uganda's oldest and largest public university. She then obtained a Diploma in Legal practice, from the Law Development Centre. She was then admitted to the Uganda Bar, as a practicing attorney.

Her degree of Master of Laws in Oil and Gas, was obtained from Robert Gordon University, in Scotland. She also holds a Postgraduate Diploma in Taxation and Revenue Administration, awarded by the Uganda Revenue Authority Training School, in Kampala. She is a Fellow of the Institute of Chartered Secretaries and Administrators of England.

== Career ==
Ms Rubagumya spent over 20 years at the Uganda Revenue Authority, having taken up employment there in 2001. She rose through the ranks at the agency and was the Assistant Commissioner Board Affairs, Policy and Rulings at URA. She was judged to be the best applicant in a field of four candidates who interviewed for the position of Commissioner, Board Matters and Legal Affairs.

In August 2017 at the URA, she was involved in the closure of three branches of Kenya-based Nakumatt Supermarkets, due to tax arrears amounting to "at least USh300 million (US$86,000), excluding accumulated interest for the past five years". That action effectively kicked Nakumatt out of Uganda.

== Other considerations ==
In her position as "Commissioner for Legal Services and Board Affairs", she was member of "Senior Management" at URA. In her position as Company Secretary, she was a member of the board of directors of the tax agency.

== See also ==
- Simon Kagugube
- Samallie Kiyingi
- Economy of Uganda

== Succession table ==
Preceded by Doris Akol	Commissioner for Legal Services and Board Affairs at Uganda Revenue Authority; 4 February 2015 - 25 November 2022	Succeeded by TBA
