= Nicholas Okwir =

Ugandan accountant

- Born: 1 July 1948 (age 78); Uganda
- Citizenship: Uganda
- Education: Namilyango College (High School Diploma); University of Nairobi (Bachelor of Commerce); Strathmore University (Certified Public Accountant)
- Occupations: Accountant, Banker, Business Executive
- Years active: 1983 — present
- Known for: Banking, Finance

Nicholas John Okwir is a Ugandan accountant, banker and business executive, who served as the founding managing director and chief executive officer of Housing Finance Bank, Uganda's largest mortgagee lender, between November 2007 until December 2013.

Prior to that, from January 1983 until November 2007, he served as the chief accountant of what was then Housing Finance Company, before it was granted a banking licence by the Bank of Uganda in January 2008.

== Early life and education ==
Okwir was born in Uganda circa 1948. After attending local primary schools, he was admitted to Namilyango College, a prestigious all-boys boarding high school in Mukono District, where he graduated with a High School Diploma. He was admitted to the University of Nairobi with a Bachelor of Commerce degree. He went on to study at Strathmore University before he qualified as a Certified Public Accountant.

== Career ==
In 1983, following the conclusion of his professional education in Kenya, Okwir returned to Uganda and took up employment at what was then Housing Finance Company, a government-owned mortgage lender, as the chief accountant, serving in that capacity for the next 24 years.

When the institution received a commercial banking license, Okwir served as the founding managing director and CEO of Housing Finance Bank for five years, until he retired in March 2013.

== Other considerations ==
In 2015, he was appointed to the board of directors of Uganda Revenue Authority (URA), where he is the chairman of the board's audit committee. He also serves as the chairperson of the Federation of Uganda Employers.

Preceded by None	Managing Director of Housing Finance Bank; 2008 - 2013	Succeeded by Mathias Katamba
