= Hope Ekudu =

Ugandan statistician and bank executive

- Born: 1985 (age 40–41); Uganda
- Citizenship: Uganda
- Education: Makerere University (Bachelor of Statistics); Heriot-Watt University (Master of Business Administration); Strathmore University (Chief executive apprenticeship training)
- Occupations: Bank manager, statistician, business administrator
- Years active: 2010–present
- Title: Chief operating officer of DFCU Bank

Hope Ekudu is a Ugandan statistician, bank manager and business administrator. She served as the chief operating officer of DFCU Bank, since August 2020 until April 2023. Before that, she was the head of retail banking at Housing Finance Bank, effective August 2015.

== Background and education ==
Ekudu was born circa 1985 to Grace Adoku, and Pastor John Ekudu-Adoku, a Christian minister and former dean of students at Makerere University, Uganda's largest and oldest public university. She is the last-born in a family of four siblings; Paul, Charity, Faith and Hope.

She was admitted to Makerere University, where she earned a Bachelor of Statistics degree in 2006. She went on to attend Heriot Watt University, in Edinburgh, Scotland, where she graduated with a Master of Business Administration, in 2011.

She also spent one year undergoing training organised by CEO Club Uganda and Strathmore University, to prepare her for the role of chief executive officer. Ekudu was a member of the pioneer class of 30 students who undertook the year-long course in 2013.

== Career ==
In 2010, she was hired by Barclays Bank of Uganda, as the head of the team that processes payments and international services, including SWIFT, RTGS and EFT transactions. After two years in that role, she was promoted to head of payments at the same bank, serving in that capacity until 2014.

In July 2014, Ekudu was hired by Housing Finance Bank, a commercial bank that focuses on mortgage lending. She served in various roles at HFB, including as general manager of operations, general manager of retail banking and general manager of operations and business technology.

== Other considerations ==
Ekudu was one of the eleven senior managers at HFB, who reported directly to the bank's managing director and chief executive officer.
