= Walusimbi =

Walusimbi is a surname. Notable people with the surname include:

- Enock Walusimbi (born 1998), Ugandan footballer
- Godfrey Walusimbi (born 1989), Ugandan footballer
- John Baptist Walusimbi, Ugandan politician and engineer
- Samuel Walusimbi (born 1948), Ugandan cricketer
- Sarah Walusimbi, Ugandan lawyer
- Solomon Walusimbi (born 1999), Ugandan footballer
