= ROKO Construction Company =

Construction company in Uganda

Coordinates: 00°22′41″N 32°33′31″E

- Type: Private
- Industry: Construction
- Founded: 1969; 57 years ago
- Key people: Jean Mann Koehler; Chairperson; Mark Koehler; Managing Director/CEO
- Services: Commercial construction
- Number of employees: 857 (Full Time); 1,181 (Temporary); Total: 2,038 (2021)
- Website: roko.com

ROKO Construction Limited, also Roko Construction Limited, is one of the top five construction companies in Uganda, according to Construction Review Online, as of April 2021. Headquartered in Kampala, Uganda's capital city, ROKO, as it is often referred to, is active in Uganda, Kenya, Rwanda, Tanzania, DR Congo and South Sudan.

== Overview ==
ROKO was established in 1969 by two engineers; the late Max Rohrer (1935–2005), a native of Germany and the late Rainer Gottlieb Koehler (1931–2013), a native of Switzerland. As of April 2021 the company employed over 850 full-time staff and over 1,180 temporary workers of diverse nationalities, including over 100 key staff, of whom about half are engineers.

== Ownership ==
The business is privately owned by the families of the two original founders.

== Subsidiaries and affiliates ==
As of April 2021, the company maintains the following affiliates and/or subsidiaries:

1. ROKO Rwanda Limited

2. ROKO South Sudan Limited

3. ROKO Congo Limited

4. ROKO Technical Services Limited

== Governance ==
The Roko Construction board of directors has six members:

1. Jean Mann Koehler: Chairperson

2. Mark Koehler: Managing Director

3. Peter Mugarura: Director

4. Brigitte Koehler: Director

== Projects ==
This is a partial listing of past and current construction projects, where ROKO Construction is or was the lead contractor:

1. Basilica of the Uganda Martyrs, Namugongo: Work began in 1967 and was concluded in 1975. ROKO, the lead contractor, went back and carried out major renovations in 2015.

2. Mapeera House, the headquarters of Centenary Bank, on Kampala Road, in Kampala, Uganda's capital city. Construction began in 2007 and was completed in 2012.

3. DFCU House, the headquarters of DFCU Bank. Constructed at 46 Kyaddondo Road, on Nakasero Hill, from 2011 until 2013.

4. JLOS House Project, a three-component government office development project in Uganda's capital city of Kampala, to house the offices of the Justice, Law and Order Sector (JLOS).

== Recent developments ==
As of November 2020, the government of Uganda owed Roko Construction Limited a sum of USh46,997,280,913.08 (approximately US$13 million) at that time, being payment for completed or ongoing work, according to Matia Kasaija, Uganda's Minister of Finance, as reported by the Red Pepper Newspaper. Roko was going through a temporary cash flow crunch at that time.

In July 2022, Ugandan online media reported that the Ugandan government was negotiating with the owners of the company, to acquire 150,000 preferential shares in the business, in exchange for UGX202.13 billion (approx. US$54.12 million). This was at a time when ROKO had an estimated business pipeline, in excess of UGX1,204 billion (approx. US$325 million) in Uganda's oil sector.

== See also ==
- Economy of Uganda
- Dott Services
