= Gerald Kasaato =

Uganda accountant, lawyer and corporate executive

Gerald Paul Kasaato
- Citizenship: Uganda
- Education: Oxford Brookes University (Bachelor of Science in Accounting); Nottingham Trent University (Bachelor of Laws); London South Bank University (Master of Science in International Finance and Investments); University of Exeter (Master of Business Administration)
- Occupations: Business executive, accountant & lawyer
- Title: Deputy managing director, National Social Security Fund

Gerald Paul Kasato is a Ugandan accountant, lawyer, chartered financial analyst, and business executive. He is the deputy managing director and deputy chief executive officer of NSSF Uganda, since 21 June 2024. He worked in the same position in acting capacity from August 2023 until June 2024. Before that, he was the chief investment officer (CIO) at the same institution between 2014 and August 2023.

== Background and education ==
He is a Ugandan national. His degree of Bachelor of Science in accounting was awarded by the Oxford Brookes University in the United Kingdom. He also holds a Bachelor of Laws degree from Nottingham Trent University. His degree of Master of Science in International Finance and Investments, was awarded by the London South Bank University. He obtained his Masters in Finance degree with Distinction and was the best graduating student of his cohort. His Master of Business Administration was obtained from the University of Exeter. He also attended advanced leadership and management courses from the Harvard Business School and from the Wharton School, both in the United States, and from the London Business School in the United Kingdom.

Kasaato is a chartered financial analyst (CFA), a fellow of the Chartered Management Institute of the United Kingdom, a chartered certified accountant of the UK and a certified public accountant (CPA) of Uganda.

== Work history ==
Kasaato worked in various entities in the United Kingdom before relocating to Uganda in the mid-2000s. He worked with National Housing and Construction Company, as finance and investment manager and with National Insurance Company Limited, as manager of investment and treasury.

He joined NSSF Uganda in 2011 as portfolio manager, equities. In 2014 he was promoted to Chief Investment Officer. In August 2023, he was appointed as acting deputy managing director to replace Patrick Ayota, who was elevated to managing director/CEO. After ten months in acting capacity, the Uganda NSSF board recommended that Kasaato be appointed as the substantive deputy CEO.
