= Charles Olaro =

Ugandan surgeon

Dr. Charles Olaro

Director General of Health Services
- Incumbent
- Assumed office May 2025
- Preceded by: Henry Mwebesa

Personal details
- Born: Ngora District, Uganda
- Citizenship: Ugandan
- Education: Makerere University; Eastern and Southern African Management Institute (ESAMI)
- Occupation: Surgeon, public health specialist, health administrator
- Profession: Medical doctor

Charles Olaro is a Ugandan senior consultant surgeon, public health specialist, and health administrator who serves as the Director General of Health Services at the Ministry of Health of Uganda.

== Early life and education background ==
Olaro was born in Ngora District, Uganda. He attended Ngora Primary School before joining Manjasi High School in 1982 for O-Level. He attended Namilyango College for A-Level, and enrolled at Makerere University to study medicine in 1988.

Olaro graduated with a Bachelor of Medicine and Bachelor of Surgery (MBChB) from Makerere University in 1994. He later returned to Makerere University in 1996 for postgraduate training in surgery and obtained a Master of Medicine (MMed) in Surgery in 1999. He also earned a Master of Science in Health Services Management and a Master of business administration (MBA) from the Eastern and Southern African Management Institute (ESAMI).

== Career ==
Olaro started his career as a Medical Officer at Lacor Hospital in Gulu and later worked as a Senior House Officer at Mulago National Referral Hospital. From April 2001 to June 2008, he was a Medical Superintendent and Consultant Surgeon at Arua Regional Referral Hospital before becoming a Medical Superintendent at Fort Portal Regional Referral Hospital in July 2008 until October 2010.

From 2010 to 2017, Olaro served as the Hospital Director and Senior Consultant Surgeon at Fort Portal Regional Referral Hospital. In 2017, he was appointed Director of Clinical Services at the Ministry of Health and later that year became Director of Curative Services, a position he held until 2025.

In November 2024, he was acting director general of health services at the Ministry of Health of Uganda before becoming director general of health services in May 2025.
