= Sarah Walusimbi =

Ugandan lawyer and corporate executive

- Born: Uganda
- Citizenship: Ugandan
- Education: Makerere University (Bachelor of Laws); Law Development Centre (Postgraduate Diploma in Legal Practice); Eastern and Southern African Management Institute (Master of Business Administration)
- Occupations: Lawyer & Corporate Executive
- Years active: 1985 – present
- Title: Vice-Chairperson, of National Social Security Fund in Uganda

Sarah Irene Walusimbi is a Ugandan lawyer and who serves as the Corporation Secretary of the National Water and Sewerage Corporation (NWSC).

Before that, between 15 September 2015 and 14 September 2018, she also concurrently served as the Vice-Chairperson of the board of directors of the National Social Security Fund of Uganda.

== Background and education ==
Ms Walusimbi attended Makerere University, Uganda's oldest university, where she studied law. She graduated a Bachelor of Laws (LLB) degree. The following year, she obtained the Diploma in Legal Practice from the Law Development Centre in Kampala, the capital of Uganda and its largest city. Later, she obtained a Master of Business Administration (MBA) degree, from the Eastern and Southern African Management Institute (ESAMI).

== Career ==
Walusimbi is a lawyer and an advocate of the High Court of Uganda and a seasoned and experienced corporate lawyer, with a record spanning over 30 years. She has previously served as the Chief Manager, Management Services, at the National Water and Sewerage Corporation (NWSC), the government agency responsible for supplying drinking water and collecting, treating and disposing of waste water in the country.

For period of nearly five months from 8 May 2015, when the previous chairperson died, until 29 September 2015, when a substantive replacement was appointed, she served as Chairperson of NSSF, in an acting capacity. She represents the Federation of Uganda Employers on the NSSF board.

== Other considerations ==
Sarah Walusimbi is a member of the Uganda Law society, the Institute of Corporate Governance and of the Women Lawyers Association of Uganda. She also sits on the board of directors of Housing Finance Bank, a commercial bank where NSSF owns 50 percent shareholding.

== See also ==
- Peninnah Kasule
- Anne Abeja Muhwezi
- Agnes Tibayeyita Isharaza
