= Tariye Gbadegesin =

Nigerian-American corporate executive

- Born: Ibadan, Nigeria
- Citizenship: United States and Nigeria
- Education: Amherst College (Bachelor of Economics); Harvard School of Business (Master of Business Administration)
- Occupations: Senior Corporate Executive and Finance
- Years active: 2001–present
- Known for: Emerging Market Investments, Development Finance, Climate Finance, Infrastructure
- Title: Chief Executive Officer; Climate Investment Funds (CIF).
- Term: March 2024 – 2027
- Predecessor: Mafalda Duarte

Tariye Gbadegesin is a Nigerian-American businesswoman and corporate executive who is the chief executive officer of the Climate Investment Funds (CIF), effective 1 March 2024. She is the first African woman to serve in that role. She is based in Washington, DC, United States. Before that, she served as the CEO of the Lagos, Nigeria-based ARM Harith Infrastructure Investments, a joint investment fund owned by the Asset & Resource Management Company Limited ("ARM") of Nigeria and Harith General Partners (Pty) Limited ("Harith") of South Africa. Gbadegesin was also the co-chair of the Voluntary Carbon Markets Integrity Initiative (VCMI), a global initiative to mobilize high integrity carbon markets.

== Background and education ==
She is an American and Nigerian national. Her American mother with origins from Maine in the United States and a Nigerian Father from the Niger Delta region of Nigeria were academics in Nigeria and in the US. Born in Ibadan, she grew up in Port Harcourt, the capital city of Rivers State in the Niger Delta. Her mother led the Institute of Pollution Studies and the Niger Delta Wetlands Center organizations dedicated to environmental protection and community development in the Niger Delta region of Nigeria. Her father was the Minister of Science and Technology for the Federal Government of Nigeria from 2000 to 2007.

She holds a Bachelor of Economics degree from Amherst College and a Master of Business Administration from the Harvard School of Business.

== Career ==
Her business career spans over 20 years. Past employers include the Africa Finance Corporation, the International Monetary Fund, the Boston Consulting Group and Price Waterhouse Coopers.

As CEO of CIF, she leads an US$11 billion investment fund owned by the G20, administered by the World Bank in collaboration with the African Development Bank, the Asian Development Bank, the Inter-American Development Bank, the European Bank for Reconstruction and Development and the Asian Infrastructure Investment Bank. CIF invests in climate mitigation projects in 72 developing nations in the world.

== Other considerations ==
Gbadegesin is a Non-Executive Director at Guinness Nigeria Plc, a subsidiary of Diageo Plc. She sits on the Advisory Council of the Millennium Challenge Corporation in Washington D.C., United States. She is also a member of the Advisory Committee on Infrastructure for the United Nations Principles for Responsible Investing. In addition, she co-chairs the steering committee for the Voluntary Carbon Markets Integrity Initiative launched by the Government of the United Kingdom and the Children's International Investment Fund.

== See also ==
- Doris Akol
