= Jennifer Mwijukye =

Ugandan businesswoman

- Citizenship: Uganda
- Education: Bachelor's degree in Business Administration from Makerere University Uganda. Master's degree in Transport Economics and Logistics Management from Eastern and Southern African Management Institute (ESAMI) in Tanzania
- Occupation: Business Woman
- Organization(s): Founder, and CEO of Unifreight Group.
- Board member of: Member of the Association of Uganda Freight Forwarders and currently serves as the board chair of Uganda Women Entrepreneurs Association Ltd (UWEAL).
- Children: 4
- Awards: International award as the Entrepreneur of the Year. Continental award as the Most Influential Woman in Business and Government in Logistics on the continent of Africa by CEO Global Prestigious MTN Award as CEO of the Year

Jennifer Mwijukye is a Ugandan businesswoman, founder, and CEO of Unifreight Group. She is a member of the Association of Uganda Freight Forwarders and currently serves as the board chair of Uganda Women Entrepreneurs Association Ltd (UWEAL).

== Background and Education ==
Jennifer holds a bachelor's degree in Business Administration from Makerere University in Uganda and a master's degree in Transport Economics and Logistics Management from Eastern and Southern African Management Institute (ESAMI) in Tanzania. She worked as a purchasing assistant with British American Tobacco for five years after graduating from the National College of Business Studies from 1989 to 1994 and after joining urgent cargo handling.

She is a Christian and married woman with four children. She has also authored a book "Memoir of a Business Minister".

== Awards ==
On 26th Feb 2016, Jennifer received an International award as the Entrepreneur of the Year from the International Network of Women Entrepreneurs Miami USA.

On 10 November 2015, Jennifer received a continental award as the Most Influential Woman in Business and Government in Logistics on the continent of Africa by CEO Global from South Africa. She had won the East African award of the same before emerging winner at a continental level.

Jennifer also received the prestigious MTN Award as CEO of the Year on 22/3/2014.
