= Thobani Centre =

- Location within Kampala

General information
- Type: Commercial
- Location: Kampala Road; Kampala, Uganda
- Coordinates: 00°18′46″N 32°35′09″E
- Construction started: December 2014
- Completed: 28 July 2018

Technical details
- Floor count: 10

Design and construction
- Architect: Happy Herbert Kasoro

Thobani Centre is a commercial building in Kampala, the capital and largest city of Uganda.

== Location ==
The skyscraper is located on Kampala Road, the main business street in Kampala, Uganda's capital city, to the immediate west of the headquarters of KCB Bank Uganda Limited, and across the street from Orient Plaza, the headquarters of Orient Bank. The geographical coordinates of the building are:0°18'46.0"N, 32°35'09.0"E (Latitude:0.312778; Longitude:32.585833).

== Overview ==
Thobani Centre is owned by its developers, an entity known as Thobani Ventures Limited, owned by Kanani Group of India, Jubilee Stores of Dubai and Fourways Investments Limited of Uganda. Mohamood Thobani, managing director of Fourways Investments, also doubles as the vice chairman of Diamond Trust Bank Uganda Limited.

== Tenants ==
Thobani Centre is a mixed use development that caters to corporate offices, restaurants, and retail outlets.

== See also ==
- Mapeera House
- Janani Luwum Church House
- DFCU House
- Tall Kampala Buildings
- Central Kampala
