= John Musinguzi Rujoki =

Ugandan corporate executive (born 1973)

- Born: 1973 (age 52–53); Uganda
- Education: Ntare School (High School Diploma); Makerere University (Bachelor of Science in Mathematics); University of Greenwich (Master of Science in Computing & Information Systems)
- Occupation: Corporate executive
- Years active: 1995 — present
- Known for: Mathematics, ICT, Leadership
- Title: Commissioner-General of Uganda Revenue Authority

John Musinguzi Rujoki (born c. 1973), is a Ugandan mathematician and corporate executive who serves as the Commissioner-General of the Uganda Revenue Authority (URA), effective 2 April 2020.

== Early life and education ==
Musinguzi was born in Rubirizi, Uganda circa 1973. After attending local primary school, he was admitted to Ntare School, a prestigious all-boys boarding high school in Mbarara city, where he obtained a High School Diploma. He was admitted to Makerere University, Uganda's oldest and largest public university, where he graduated with a Bachelor of Science degree in Mathematics. He went on to study at the University of Greenwich, in the United Kingdom, where he graduated with a Master of Science degree in Computing and Information Systems.

== Career ==
In 2000, Rujoki served as the head of the finance and audit department of the Special Revenue Protection Services (SRPS), a military unit attached to the Uganda Revenue Authority. The SRPS is credited with wiping out smuggling at Ugandan borders and especially on Lake Nalubaale.

In April he was appointed to lead at URA, as the new Commissioner General, replacing Doris Akol, who had served one year and five months of her second consecutive four-year contract. Within 60 days of his appointment four senior managers at URA resigned and the URA board "accepted" their resignations.

== Other considerations ==
In addition to his other assignments, Rujoki serves as the Chairman of board of National Information Technology Authority (NITA-U), since October 2019. He is also a senior advisor on Information and Communications Technology (ICT) to the President of Uganda, since 2015. In his capacity as Commissioner General, he sits on the seven-person board of directors of the Uganda Revenue Authority, as his predecessors did.

== Succession table at URA ==
Preceded by Doris Akol	Commissioner General of Uganda Revenue Authority; 2020 - present	Succeeded by Incumbent
