= CSNZ =

CSNZ may refer to:

- Chartered Secretaries New Zealand, the New Zealand division of the Institute of Chartered Secretaries and Administrators
- Chico Science & Nação Zumbi, a Brazilian rock band formed by Chico Science
- Counter-Strike Nexon: Studio, formerly Counter-Strike Nexon: Zombies a 2014 video game by Valve
