= Juma Kisaame =

Ugandan accountant and businessman (born 1965)

- Born: 1965 (age 60–61); Uganda
- Education: Makerere University (Bachelor of Commerce)
- Occupation: Accountant
- Years active: 1989–present
- Title: Chairman; Uganda Revenue Authority and Uganda Investment Authority

Juma Kisaame is a Ugandan accountant, businessman, and former bank executive. He is the current chairman of the Uganda Revenue Authority, since March 2020. He also serves as chairman of Uganda Investment Authority.

He is the immediate-past managing director and chief executive officer of the DFCU Bank, the fourth-largest commercial bank in the country by assets.

== Background and education ==
Juma Kisaame was born in Uganda circa 1965. He attended Makerere University, the oldest and largest public university in Uganda, graduating with the degree of Bachelor of Commerce in 1988.

== Career ==
Following his studies at Makerere, Kisaame joined Uganda Development Bank in 1988, as a Trainee Accountant. He worked there until 1992, rising in the process to the position of Senior Accountant. He joined DFCU in 1992 as Head of Finance. He worked in different roles in the bank until 2004. That year, he left to join Eurafrican Bank (EAB) in neighboring Tanzania as managing director. Founded in 1995, EAB was acquired by Bank of Africa Tanzania in 2007. In 2007, Juma Kisaame returned to DFCU Bank as the managing director, and served in that role, until his resignation in 2019.

== Other responsibilities ==
Since 2006, he has served as a Director on the Board of Jubilee Holdings Limited, the parent company of Jubilee Insurance. Since January 2015, he also serves as the chairman of Uganda Investment Authority. In March 2020, he was appointed as chairman of Uganda Revenue Authority, replacing Dr. Simon Kagugube, who died in February 2020.

In 2002, Kisaame founded Uganda Leasing Association and served as its President, from 2002 until 2006.

== See also ==
- DFCU Group
- Uganda Investment Authority
- List of banks in Uganda
