= Mugabi =

Mugabi is a surname. Notable people with the surname include:

- Bevis Mugabi (born 1995), English footballer
- John Mugabi (born 1960), Ugandan boxer
- Michael Mugabi, Ugandan lawyer and corporate executive
- Susan Mugabi Nakaziba, Ugandan politician

== See also ==
- Mugabe (disambiguation)
