= Governance Institute of Australia =

Governance Institute of Australia logo

Governance Institute of Australia, formerly Chartered Secretaries Australia, is an independent professional association for company secretaries, governance advisers and risk managers in Australia, committed to promoting sound practice in governance and risk management.

== History ==
A number of company secretaries joined together in the United Kingdom in 1891 to form a society which promoted their professional interests. The society obtained incorporation under a Royal Charter in 1902 and the members of the Chartered Institute of Secretaries of Joint Stock Companies and other Public Bodies become known as Chartered Secretaries. An amendment to the Institute's Charter gave it the name of the Institute of Chartered Secretaries and Administrators (ICSA) in 1971.

Established in Australia in 1909, the Institute of Chartered Secretaries and Administrators — Australian Division changed its name to Governance Institute of Australia in 2013.

== Profile ==
The Governance Institute independently advocates for reform in corporate governance. and releases research on governance and risk management.

The Governance Institute is a member of the Australian Securities Exchange (ASX) Corporate Governance Council, which issues the Corporate Governance Principles and Recommendations against which all Australian listed companies must report. The Governance Institute regularly publishes Good Governance Guides which focus on the practical aspects of implementing sound practice in governance and corporate law.

The Governance Institute also publishes a journal and a publications program, and offers public and in-house training, conferences and education in governance and risk management.

== Education ==
The Governance Institute provides internationally recognised qualifications in the areas of governance and risk management and provides training to organisations to help them with their governance practices.

The Governance Institute's Graduate Diploma of Applied Corporate Governance is the only applied postgraduate course in governance with higher education accreditation in Australia. The Governance Institute Associate and Fellow Members are entitled to use the postnominals AGIA and FGIA, as well as the designation Chartered Secretary and the postnominals ACG and FCG.

In addition, Governance Institute offers two risk specific postgraduate courses: Graduate Certificate of Applied Risk Management and Graduate Diploma of Applied Risk Management and Corporate Governance.

The Institute also offers both a Certificate in Governance Practice and a Certificate in Governance and Risk Management. The Governance Institute Certificated Members carry the nationally recognised post nominal of GIA(Cert).
