= Peninnah Tukamwesiga =

21st-century Ugandan lawyer

- Born: 1986 (age 38–39); Uganda
- Education: Makerere University (Bachelor of Laws) (Master of Laws); Law Development Centre (Diploma in Legal Practice)
- Known for: Legal matters
- Title: Director, Central Organization of Free Trade Unions (COFTU) Legal Aid

Peninnah Tukamwesiga, (also Peninna Tukamwesiga), is a Ugandan lawyer, who specializes in employment and labor matters. As of March 2019, she serves on the board of the Uganda National Social Security Fund. NSSF Uganda is a retirement benefits company, with nearly US$3 billion in total assets, as of June 2018.

== Education ==
Tukamwesiga was born in Uganda and attended local elementary and secondary schools. She holds a Bachelor of Laws degree, awarded by Makerere University. She then obtained a Diploma in Legal practice, from the Law Development Centre. Following that, she was admitted to the Uganda Bar, as a practicing attorney. Later, she went back to Makerere University Law School and obtained a Master of Laws degree.

== Career ==
From 2010, for a period of three years, Tukamwesiga was an associate attorney at Murangira and Company Advocates, a Kampala-based law firm. Also in 2010, she began working as the Director of Legal Aid at the Central Organization of Free Trade Unions (COFTU). She was first appointed to the Board of NSSF Uganda in 2015 and was reappointed in 2018.

== Other considerations ==
In addition to her other responsibilities, Tukamwesiga serves as a board member at Uganda Clays Limited, a company that manufactures baked clay building products and whose shares are listed on the Uganda Securities Exchange. She was first appointed on 9 December 2015 and was re-appointed on 7 July 2017.

She also sits on the 10-person board of Uganda National Social Security Fund. Tukamwesiga is also one of fifteen panelists at the Uganda Industrial Court. She is one of the five panelists who represent workers at the court.

== See also ==
- Florence Mawejje
- Samallie Kiyingi
- Patience Tumusiime Rubagumya
