= Chartered Secretaries (Hong Kong) =

Hong Kong professional body

Chartered Secretaries or Hong Kong Institute of Chartered Secretaries (HKICS) (Chinese: 香港特許秘書公會) is an independent professional body dedicated to the promotion of its members’ role in the formulation and effective implementation of good governance policies in Hong Kong and throughout China as well as the development of the profession of Chartered Secretary. Through its association with the Institute of Chartered Secretaries and Administrators (ICSA), HKICS also acts as the China Division of the worldwide institute.

== History ==
HKICS was first established in 1949 as an association of Hong Kong members of ICSA of London. It became a branch of ICSA in 1990 before gaining local status in 1994 and today has 5,666 members and approximately 2,500 students

== Qualifying Examination Scheme and the Exemption Policy ==
To qualify as a member of HKICS, there are two routes:

1. Register as a student and successfully sit for the examinations of the International Qualifying Scheme (IQS). This is a portable global qualification, covering subjects such as corporate governance; corporate administration; corporate secretaryship; company law, accounting, taxation and management.
  For those holding a relevant degree/ professional qualification like Accounting, Finance, Law and Management, there is an exemption policy that entitles up to a maximum of 4 subject exemptions from both Professional Programme Part I and II under IQS. All the exemptions are the discretion of the Institute and the final decision rests with the Exemption Sub-Committee.
2. Complete the post graduate collaborative courses that have been developed by the Institute and local universities: City University of Hong Kong, The Open University of Hong Kong and The Hong Kong Polytechnic University, leading to full exemption of the IQS for graduates.

== Membership Profile ==
Having gained relevant work experience before, during or after the study for examinations, graduates can qualify as Associates (3–6 years) or fellows (8 years or above) of the HKICS.

As a qualified member, a dual membership is offered from both ICSA and HKICS. This qualification is recognised by other divisions in other countries such as United Kingdom, New Zealand, Canada, Singapore, Malaysia, Australia, South Africa and more than 60 other countries throughout the world.

== See also ==
- Institute of Chartered Secretaries and Administrators
- Corporate Governance
- Company secretary
