= JLOS House Project =

Uganda government office development project

JLOS Towers
- Location within Kampala

General information
- Type: Government Offices
- Location: 98-102 Katalima Road; Naguru, Kampala; Uganda
- Coordinates: 0.341114°N 32.610832°E
- Construction started: 2022
- Completed: 2026 (Expected)
- Cost: USh 256,000,000,000

Technical details
- Floor count: 11
- Floor area: 80,000 square metres (861,113 sq ft)

Design and construction
- Architect: FBW Architects
- Main contractor: Seyani Brothers & Company Uganda Limited

The JLOS House Project, is a three-component government office development project under construction in Uganda's capital city of Kampala. The buildings are intended to house the offices of the Justice, Law and Order Sector (JLOS). The three components of the project are:

- JLOS Towers, an 80,000 square metres (861,113 sq ft) office complex to house the headquarters of more than a dozen law enforcement and social services government departmental offices.
- Uganda Police Headquarters, a modern building to house the headquarters of the Uganda Police Force.
- Renovation, refurbishment and enlargement of existing office buildings that house the Courts of Appeal and headquarters of the Judiciary, to also accommodate the Uganda Constitutional Court and the Uganda Supreme Court.

== Location ==
The first component of the project is the JLOS Towers to be located at 98-102 Katalima Road, in the Naguru neighborhood, in the Nakawa Division of Kampala, about 6 kilometres (4 mi), northeast of the city's central business district. The coordinates of the JLOS Towers would be 0°20'28.0"N, 32°36'39.0"E (Latitude:0.341114; Longitude:32.610832).

The second component in the project, is the headquarters of the Uganda Police Force, to be constructed immediately south of the JLOS Towers, at 40-96 Katalima Road, Naguru.

The third component is the renovation, refurbishment and enlargement of existing office buildings that house the Courts of Appeal and headquarters of the Judiciary, to accommodate the Uganda Supreme Court, previously housed in a building on Upper Kololo Terrace on Kololo Hill. The focus location is in the centre of the city, bounded by Lumumba Avenue to the north, Buganda Road to the south, Square One to the west and Square Two to the east. The coordinates of this location are: 0°18'56.0"N, 32°34'46.0"E (Latitude:0.315556; Longitude:32.579438).

== Overview ==
JLOS Towers is planned to house the following government departments, currently scattered in different locations across the city:

1. The headquarters of the Uganda Ministry of Justice and Constitutional Affairs
2. The Uganda High Court
3. The Uganda Ministry of Internal Affairs
4. Offices of Uganda Human Rights Commission
5. Headquarters of Uganda Prison Services
6. Headquarters of Uganda Registration Services Bureau
7. The Justice, Law and Order Sector Secretariat
8. Offices of Uganda Law Reform Commission
9. Headquarters and offices of The Directorate of Public Prosecution
10. Offices of the Judicial Service Commission
11. Headquarters of National Identification and Registration Authority
12. Uganda Ministry of Gender, Labor and Social Development
13. Headquarters of Uganda Tax Appeals Tribunal
14. Headquarters of the Centre for Arbitration and Dispute Resolution
15. The Uganda Directorate of Citizenship and Immigration Control.

== Construction ==
In August 2015, following open international bidding, a consortium led by TWED Property Development Limited of Uganda and G5 Property Development Limited of South Africa was selected to design, develop, construct and manage the project in a public-private partnership (PPP) arrangement. The other members of the consortium include FBW Architects and ROKO Construction Company. Financing will be provided by Standard Bank of South Africa and Stanbic Bank Uganda. Construction was expected to commence in 2016.

In the end, the engineering, procurement and construction (EPC) contractor is Seyani Brothers & Company Uganda Limited and the supervising engineer is Symbion Uganda Limited. Construction began in June 2022 and is expected to conclude after 49 months at a cost of USh:256 billion (US$69 million).

== See also ==
- List of tallest buildings in Kampala
- Luzira Maximum Security Prison
- Kitalya Maximum Security Prison
