= Mafalda Duarte =

Portuguese climate economist

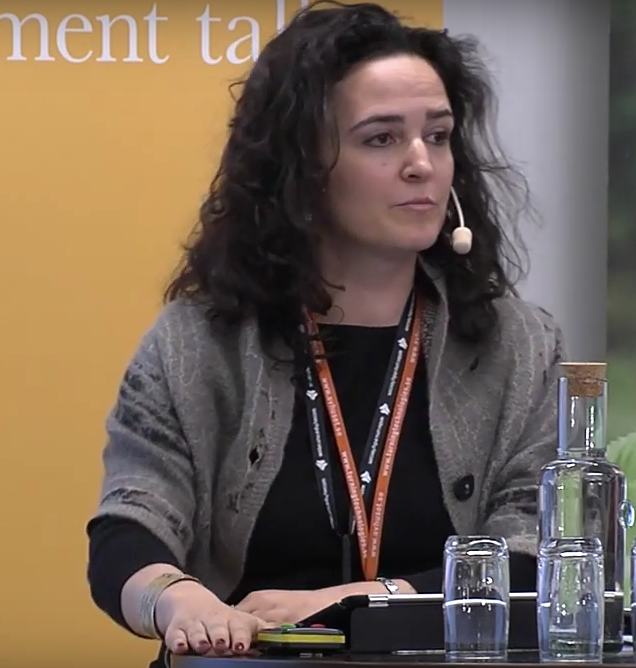
- Mafalda Duarte in 2013
- Born: Covilhã, Portugal
- Education: University of Minho; University of Bradford; Columbia University
- Occupation: Climate economist
- Employer: Green Climate Fund

Mafalda Duarte is the executive director of the Green Climate Fund, the largest multilateral climate fund in the world. Duarte previously worked at the African Development Bank and World Bank, and has served as CEO of the Climate Investment Funds, managing a portfolio of investments for over 70 countries. She was considered one of the "100 Most Influential Climate Leaders in Business for 2023" by TIME magazine and as the third most powerful woman in business in Portugal in 2023 by Forbes Portugal.

Duarte emphasizes the need for funders to be proactive and work collectively to ensure that poorer countries which have little administrative capacity still get access to aid. She emphasizes the importance of investing in developing nations and including women in decision-making.

== Early life and education ==
Duarte was born in Covilhã, Portugal. She attended the University of Minho, completing a degree in international relations in 1998. Duarte then went to the University of Bradford in England, where she completed a Master's degree in international development studies and economics in 2000. In 2007, she earned a Master's degree in economic policy management at Columbia University, specializing in sustainable development and climate change.

== Career ==
Duarte joined the World Bank in 2003, where she worked in a variety of roles. Among her activities, she led the Poverty Reduction Economic Management (PREM) Climate Change Work Program and was involved in developing policy and analyzing climate resilience. Duarte joined the African Development Bank in 2010, serving as a Principal Climate Change Specialist and later as Climate Finance Manager. She was involved in developing policy and managing climate-related portfolios. Upon visiting Asia and sub-Saharan Africa and witnessing firsthand the impacts of climate change, she became committed to climate action.

As of 2014, Duarte became CEO of the Climate Investment Funds, with an $8.3 billion portfolio of investments involving clean energy, sustainability, land management, and resilience. She worked with over 70 middle and low-income countries, many of which are experiencing the impacts of climate change, to encourage climate-smart and resilient economic policies. Duarte worked to direct public finance in ways that would support transition to low-carbon economies.

As of August 1, 2023, Duarte became the Executive Director of the Green Climate Fund, succeeding Yannick Glemarec and interim director Henry Gonzalez. The Green Climate Fund (GCF) is associated with the United Nations Framework Convention on Climate Change (UNFCCC) and is the main instrument for climate finance under the Paris Agreement. The GCF is the world’s largest dedicated multilateral climate finance institution. As Executive Director, Duarte is responsible for a portfolio of more than 200 projects, estimated at US$42 billion. Duarte aims to expand the GCF's climate investments in developing countries that are most affected by climate change, and states the link between social inclusion and climate justice.

"It is essential for both companies and governments to act on the climate promises and commitments they have made. They should formulate clear plans based on science, make these plans public, and subject them to public scrutiny."

— Mafalda Duarte, “The 100 Most Influential Climate Leaders in Business 2023”, Time (2023)

== Awards and honors ==
- 2024, Barbara Ward Lecture, International Institute for Environment and Development (IIED).

== Personal life ==
Duarte is married and has three daughters, including twins.

== Bibliography ==
Her publications include Aid policy in war-torn countries : promoting development in conflict situations : the case of Angola (2003) and Distributional impact analysis of past climate variability in rural Indonesia (2009).
