= Uganda Retirement Benefits Regulatory Authority =

Semi-autonomous regulatory agency in Uganda

- URBRA

Agency overview
- Formed: 2012; 14 years ago
- Jurisdiction: Government of Uganda
- Headquarters: 1 Clement Hill Road; Kampala, Uganda; 00°19′16″N 32°35′12″E
- Employees: 43 staff (2022)
- Agency executives: Martin Anthony Nsubuga, Chief Executive Officer; Andrew Kasirye, Chairman
- Parent agency: Uganda Ministry of Finance and Economic Planning
- Website: urbra.go.ug

The Uganda Retirement Benefits Regulatory Authority (URBRA) is a government-owned, semi-autonomous agency responsible for regulating, licensing, supervising, and controlling the retirement sector in Uganda, the third-largest economy in the East African Community. The authority is also responsible for issuing guidelines to allow the liberalization of the retirement sector in the country.

== History ==
URBRA was established by an Act of Parliament of Uganda in 2011. The agency is under the Uganda Ministry of Finance and Economic Development but is semi-autonomous, with a governing board and a management team led by an executive director as the chief executive officer.

Before 2012, there were only two major retirement benefits plans in the country: the Public Employees Retirement Plan, for some civil servants, and the National Social Security Fund (Uganda), for privately employed people whose employers had at least five employees on payroll.

When URBRA was established, it was anticipated that new retirement benefits managers would be licensed and the sector would be liberalized and improved, with more choices and new retirement products introduced.

== Licensed pension schemes ==
As of June 2016, URBRA, had licensed the following pension funds:

- National Social Security Fund
- Kampala City Traders Association Retirement Fund (Kacita Retirement Fund)
- Mazima Retirement Plan

== See also ==
- Bank of Uganda
- Economy of Uganda
- Insurance Regulatory Authority of Uganda
- Uganda Revenue Authority
