= Aggrey Kiyingi =

Ugandan physician, cardiologist, entrepreneur and philanthropist (1953–2023)

- Born: 25 October 1953; Uganda
- Died: 30 September 2023 (aged 69); Sydney, Australia
- Citizenship: Uganda and Australia
- Education: Makerere University
- Occupations: Physician, cardiologist, entrepreneur, philanthropist
- Years active: 1989–2023
- Known for: Cardiology, Dehezi International Ltd, philanthropy
- Spouse: Robinah Kiyingi (d. 2005)
- Children: Samallie Kiyingi (and others)

Aggrey Kiyingi (25 October 1953 – 30 September 2023) was a Ugandan physician, cardiologist, entrepreneur and philanthropist. He trained and practiced medicine both in Uganda and Australia, with involvement in technology initiatives in Uganda.

== Early life and education ==
Kiyingi was born in Uganda. He attended Makerere University School of medicine, graduating with a Bachelor of Medicine and Bachelor of Surgery.

He later emigrated to Australia, where he underwent specialist training in cardiology and was on the consulting staff of several hospitals in Sydney, including the Westmead and Concord Hospitals.

== Career ==
By around 1989, Kiyingi had become a consultant cardiologist. His clinical focus was mainly about adult cardiology, echocardiography, hypertension, preventive cardiology, and general medicine.

In addition to medicine, he co-founded Dehezi International Ltd, a computer firm and internet service provider based in Kampala, Uganda. Through Dehezi, Kiyingi supported initiatives to provide computers and internet access to schools and other organizations.

Kiyingi was also involved in philanthropic work, donating to churches, non-governmental organizations, and educational institutions in Uganda.

== Personal life and politics ==
Kiyingi was married to Robinah Kiyingi, a Ugandan lawyer, until her death in 2005. The couple had children including Samallie Kiyingi and spent time abroad, including in Australia, where Kiyingi practiced medicine.

He was part of the Uganda Federal Democratic Organization (UFDO) renamed as Revolutionary People’s Party (RPP) and in 2015, he announced his intention to return to Uganda to contest for presidency in the 2016 Uganda general elections but never stood for office.

== Legal controversies ==
=== Murder trial ===
Kiyingi's wife, Robinah, was shot dead outside her Kampala home in 2005. Kiyingi and two others were charged with her murder. He was acquitted on 10 December 2006 after the High Court ruled that the prosecution had failed to prove his involvement.

=== Terrorism-related allegations ===
Kiyingi was, in 2015, charged by the Ugandan government with financing rebel activities affiliated with the ADF and involvement in the murder of several clerics but the charges were later dropped.

== Death ==
Kiyingi died on 30 September 2023 in Sydney, Australia. His remains were repatriated to Uganda where a memorial service was held at Namirembe Cathedral in Kampala, followed by burial at his ancestral home in Busukuma, Namulonge, Wakiso District.
