= Richard Wejuli Wabwire =

Ugandan lawyer and judge

Honorable Richard Wejuli Wabwire
- Born: 1967 (age 58–59); Uganda
- Education: Makerere University (Bachelor of Laws); Law Development Centre (Postgraduate Diploma in Legal Practice); University of Strathclyde (Certificate in Project Evaluation & Management) (Master of Business Administration)
- Occupations: Lawyer, Judge
- Years active: 1998 — present
- Known for: Law
- Title: Justice of the High Court of Uganda

Richard Wejuli Wabwire is a Ugandan lawyer and judge, on the High Court of Uganda. He was appointed to the High Court on 8 February 2018.

== Background and education ==
He was born in Uganda, circa 1967. He studied law at Makerere University, Uganda's largest and oldest public university, graduating in 1989 with a Bachelor of Laws (LLB) degree. The next year, he received a Postgraduate Diploma in Legal Practice, from the Law Development Centre, in Kampala, the national capital. He was then admitted to the Uganda Bar, as a practicing attorney.

He also studied at the University of Strathclyde, in the United Kingdom, graduating with a Certificate in Project Evaluation & Management in 1992 and a Master of Business Administration degree in 1995.

== Work experience ==
In November 1998, he was hired by BAT Uganda, as Company Secretary, Legal Counsel and Head of Legal & Regulatory Affairs. He served there, in that capacity for the next 7.25 years. In February 2006, he transferred to Kinyara Sugar Works Limited, working there as Corporation Secretary, for the next two years.

After brief stints at National Water and Sewerage Corporation (6 months) and at Century Bottlers Uganda (10 months), he was hired by Pine Consult Limited, as a Corporate Legal and Regulatory Consultant, working there for two years.

In January 2012, he was hired by East African Breweries Uganda Limited, a subsidiary of the British conglomerate Diageo Plc. He worked there for the next 2.5 years, as the director of corporate relations and regulatory affairs.

From November 2014 until he was appointed as a judge in February 2018, he served as the Corporation Secretary and Head of Legal Affairs at the National Social Security Fund of Uganda.

== Judicial career ==
He was appointed as a judge of the High Court of Uganda in February 2018. In March 2018, he was initially posted to the High Court Circuit in the city of Fort Portal, in the Western Region of Uganda. In 2019, he was reassigned to the Commercial Division of the High Court.

== Other considerations ==
He served as a board member at Kampala Serena Hotel, from February 2015 until February 2018. At the NSSF Uganda, he was a member of the board of Directors. He was replaced there, by Agnes Tibayeyita Isharaza, who was appointed, effective 1 April 2019.

== See also ==
- Supreme Court of Uganda
- Constitutional Court of Uganda
