= NSSF Mbarara Complex =

Ugandan office complex

Mbarara City House
- Location within Uganda

General information
- Type: Commercial
- Location: Mbarara, Uganda
- Coordinates: 00°36′36″S 30°39′35″E
- Construction started: June 2017
- Completed: Opened 28 June 2019

Technical details
- Floor count: 4

NSSF Mbarara Complex, also Mbarara City House, is a building in Mbarara, a city in the Western Region of Uganda.

The building is owned by the Uganda National Social Security Fund, the largest pension fund in the countries of the East African Community, with assets of nearly USh10 trillion (approx. US$2.6 billion), as of June 2018.

== Location ==
The building is located in the central business district of the city of Mbarara, in Mbarara District, about 268 kilometres (167 mi), by road, southwest of Kampala, Uganda's capital and largest city. The geographical coordinates of the building are 0°36'36.0"S 30°39'35.0"E (Latitude:-0.610000; Longitude:30.659722).

== Overview ==
Mbarara City House is owned by the Uganda National Social Security Fund (NSSF), who developed the building, between 2017 and 2019. The building houses the NSSF offices in Mbarara and the remaining space is rented out to qualified commercial entities. The mixed use building consists of 1,500 square metres (16,146 sq ft) on four floors. The complex has surface parking for 40 vehicles.

== History ==
Mbarara City House, is the second NSSF real estate investment outside the capital city of Kampala. It was developed at a cost of USh3.9 billion (approximately US$1.2 million). Other recent real estate investments by the fund include two upscale residential neighborhoods with about 50 houses, worth USh14.9 billion (approx. US$4 million) (Mbuya I and Mbuya II), in Mbuya, a Kampala neighborhood. There is also a development in the city of Jinja, (Jinja City House), approximately 81 kilometres (50 mi), by road, east of Kampala, worth USh3.5 billion (approx. US$1 million).

== See also ==
- Ankole sub-region
