= Luzira Maximum Security Prison =

Prison in Kampala, Uganda

Coordinates: 00°17′59″N 32°38′26″E

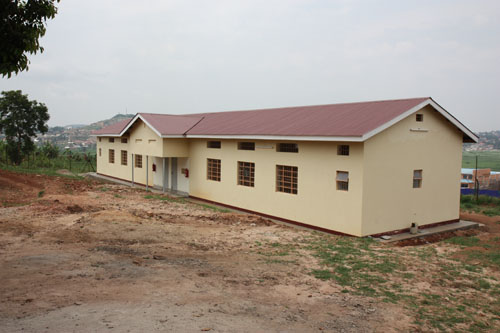
- An accommodation block at the prison (2008)
- Interactive map of Luzira Maximum Security Prison
- Location: Luzira, Kampala, Uganda
- Status: Operational
- Security class: Maximum Security Prison
- Capacity: 8,500+ (2017)
- Managed by: Uganda Prisons Services

Luzira Maximum Security Prison is a maximum security prison for both men and women in Uganda. Until Kitalya Maximum Security Prison opened in 2020, Luzira was the only maximum security prison in the country and housed Uganda's death-row inmates, as well as political prisoners.

== Location ==
The prison is in the Luzira neighborhood in Nakawa Division in southeastern Kampala, Uganda's capital and largest city. The prison is approximately 10 kilometres (6 mi) south-east of the city's central business district.

== Overview ==
The prison houses both convicted and sentenced inmates, as well as suspects awaiting trial, such as of April 2025, 11 activists who were arrested for handing a petition to the office of Kenyas largest bank, KCB Uganda Limited in Kampala to withdraw their support of EACOP.

It has a male section and female section. It also houses the country death row, amounting to about 500 men and women. A welfare project was carried out by installing windows, lighting, plumbing, furniture, mattresses and linen, as part of the African Prisons Project. The prison has a library of over 7,000 books from the United Kingdom.

== Prison management ==
In Luzira, inmates are assigned more responsibility that would be in similar prisons in the United Kingdom or the United States. Inmates assume responsibility for maintenance of harmony and functionality of the units where they live, including the growing and harvesting of food, its preparation and its distribution within the prison. Learning is encouraged, with many men learning and teaching carpentry skills to others. The guard to prisoner ration in Luzira is about 1:35, compared to 1:15 in the UK. Aggression among inmates is the exception and not the rule. The recidivism rate in Luzira is less than 30 percent, compared with 46 percent in the UK and 76 percent in the United States.

== Capacity ==
The prison was designed with capacity of 1,700 inmates, but often houses close to 8,000. On 27 August 2014, the day of the 2014 national population census, the prison housed 6,336 people; 3, 373 were in the Luzira Upper Prison, 1,495 were in Murchison Bay Prison, and Kampala Remand Prison had 1, 040 inmates. The Luzira Women’s Prison had 400 inmates and 28 children. The government of Uganda has plans to relocate the prison and expand it to capacity of 10,000. As of June 2017, the facility housed more than 8,500 inmates.

== See also ==
- Kitalya Maximum Security Prison
- JLOS House Project
