= Samallie Kiyingi =

Ugandan lawyer

- Born: 1979 (age 45–46); Kampala, Uganda
- Citizenship: Uganda and Australia
- Education: University of Technology Sydney (Bachelor’s Degree of Law and Arts in International Studies) (Graduate Diploma of Legal Practice)
- Known for: Financial business expertise
- Title: Global General Counsel at Standard Chartered Bank

Samallie Kiyingi (born in 1979) is an Australian-Ugandan finance lawyer, who works as the Global General Counsel at Standard Chartered Bank, for Corporate, Commercial and Institutional banking. Contemporaneously, she serves as the bank's General Counsel for Europe and the Americas. She is based in Singapore. Her tenure at SCB began in October 2023.

Before that, from April 2017 until October 2023, she served as the Director of Legal Affairs at the African Export–Import Bank (Afrexim Bank), based in Cairo, Egypt.

== Early life and education ==
She was born to Ugandan parents, the late Robinah Kasirye Kiyingi, a lawyer and the late Dr. Aggrey Kiyingi, a cardiologist. She holds a Bachelor's Degree of Law and Arts in International Studies and a Graduate Diploma of Legal Practice, both awarded by the University of Technology Sydney, in Sydney, Australia. She is also admitted as a solicitor in New South Wales, Australia and in England and Wales.

== Career ==
Kiyingi began her career as a banking lawyer at Ashurst LLP, which previously was Blake Dawson Waldron, in Sydney, Australia. She then worked as a Senior Associate at Clifford Chance, in London.

She also worked as a Director and the Head of the Securitization Regulatory Policy and Advisory Group at Deutsche Bank, based in London. At the time she was hired by Afreximbank, she was an independent consultant advising corporations and regulators on capital markets.

At the African Export Import Bank, she served as the Director of Legal Services and as the corporate General Counsel.

== Other considerations ==
Kiyingi is a founding member of the African Art Acquisition Committee, of the Tate Modern Art Gallery, in London, United Kingdom.

In 2018, Kiyingi was recognized as one of the 100 most influential people of African descent under 40 years of age, by The Most Influential 100 Company.

== See also ==
- Sylvia Tamale
- Peninnah Tukamwesiga
- Patience Tumusiime Rubagumya
