= Kitalya Maximum Security Prison =

Ugandan maximum security prison

- Location within Uganda
- Location: Kitalya, Wakiso District, Uganda; 00°26′13″N 32°13′36″E
- Status: Operational
- Security class: Maximum Security Prison
- Capacity: 400,000+
- Opened: 2020
- Managed by: Uganda Prisons Service

Kitalya Maximum Security Prison is a maximum security prison for both men and women in Uganda.

== Location ==
The construction of the prison was completed in 2020 and is located in the village of Kitalya, in Busiro County, Wakiso District, off the Kampala-Mityana Road. It is approximately 62 kilometres (39 mi) northwest of Luzira Maximum Security Prison, which was before 2020 Uganda's only maximum-security prison. Kitalya prison is about 54 kilometres (34 mi) northwest of the central business district of Kampala, the capital and largest city in Uganda. The coordinates of Kitalya Maximum Security Prison are 0°26'13.0"N, 32°13'36.0"E (Latitude:0.436944; Longitude:32.226667).

== Overview ==
Ambitious Construction Company Limited was awarded the construction contract, at a price of Sh18.3 billion (approx. US$5.5 million in July 2016). The new prison was intended to relieve Luzira Maximum Security Prison, which was congested. Construction was expected to conclude in 2018.

Physical construction was concluded in February 2020. However, before the facility received its first inmate, the senior staff who were going to operate the prison were expected to tour similar facilities abroad, to learn first-hand how such facilities were run.

The facility also needed to be equipped with furniture, bedding and security equipment, including closed-circuit television (CCTV) cameras and monitoring equipment. Kitalya was reported to have more than six layers of security, physical, electronic and otherwise.

== Facilities ==
The new prison has common dormitory wards, 30 individual cells, a medical wing with inpatient facilities. It also has a kitchen equipped with energy-saving technology. Other amenities include a contact visitors' room and isolation rooms for contagious diseases. It has an array of recreational facilities, including a soccer field, a basketball court, a volleyball court, and a tennis court. It sits on 5 acres (2 ha) of land, in a rural setting.

== See also ==
- African Prisons Project
- Luzira Maximum Security Prison
- JLOS House Project
