= Mathias Katamba =

Ugandan economist, entrepreneur and business executive

- Born: Uganda
- Citizenship: Uganda
- Education: University of Greenwich (BA in Economics); University of East London (MSc in Financial Management); Chartered Institute of Public Relations (Diploma in Public Relations)
- Occupations: Business executive & entrepreneur
- Years active: 1983—present
- Title: Non-executive chairman of Uganda National Oil Company

Mathias Katamba is a Ugandan economist, business executive, entrepreneur and banker. He was appointed as the non-executive chairman of the Uganda National Oil Company (UNOC), effective March 2024. From January 2019 until January 2023, he was the managing director and chief executive officer of DFCU Bank, a commercial bank in Uganda.

Before that, he was the managing director and chief executive officer of Housing Finance Bank, a commercial bank, co-owned by the Ugandan government and the National Social Security Fund (Uganda), a semi-autonomous retirement pension organisation for non-government employees in Uganda.

== Education ==
Katamba had his early education in Uganda, attending St. Mary's College Kisubi for his secondary education. He then entered the University of Greenwich, in England, graduating with the degree of Bachelor of Arts in Economics. His degree of Master of Science in Financial Management was obtained from the University of East London, also in the UK. He also holds the postgraduate Diploma in Public Relations, awarded by the Chartered Institute of Public Relations (CIPR), another UK institution. Over the years, he has attended advanced leadership courses from several institutions, including Harvard Kennedy School and Wharton Business School.

== Work experience ==
Even while still in school, Katamba exhibited entrepreneurial skill, by starting a business during the break between middle and high school. He is credited with:

- The transformation of Pride Microfinance Limited from a Non-Government Organization (NGO), into a Tier III Deposit-taking microfinance financial institution (MFI).
- The transformation of Uganda Finance t Limited, from a Tier III, Deposit-Taking MFI into a Tier 1 commercial bank, Finance Trust Bank.

In 2011, following five years at the helm of Uganda Finance Trust Limited, he took a beak from commercial banking until he was appointed CEO of Housing Finance Bank, in April 2014. Prior to that, he was managing partner and co-founder of Progression Capital Africa (PCA), a US$40 million private equity fund based in Mauritius. Before joining Finance Trust Bank, he worked at several national and regional, notable financial institutions; including Orient Bank (now I&M Bank Uganda), PostBank Uganda and Absa Group Limited.
