= Chartered Governance Institute New Zealand =

- Abbreviation: CGINZ
- Predecessor: Governance NZ Incorporated; Chartered Secretaries New Zealand (CSNZ)
- Formation: 1937
- Type: Professional body
- Legal status: Active
- Purpose: Professional development and standards for company secretaries and governance professionals
- Location: New Zealand
- Region served: New Zealand
- Services: Professional qualifications, training, and standards
- Fields: Corporate governance, company secretarial services
- Members: 1,600 members (New Zealand)
- Parent organization: Chartered Governance Institute (CGI)
- Website: cginz.org
- Formerly called: Governance NZ Incorporated, Chartered Secretaries New Zealand (CSNZ)

Chartered Governance Institute New Zealand, formerly known as Governance NZ Incorporated, and before that as Chartered Secretaries New Zealand (CSNZ), is the New Zealand division of the Institute of Chartered Secretaries and Administrators, now known as The Chartered Governance Institute (CGI). CGI is an international professional body with 44,000 members worldwide. It was founded in England in 1891, and granted its royal charter in 1902. The New Zealand Division of the institute was formed in 1937.

Governance NZ Inc has 1,600 members in New Zealand, and was established to promote and maintain the development of the profession of company secretary and the creation of high standards in the Profession. As the commercial and corporate legislative scene in New Zealand changed Governance NZ Inc expanded to reflect its members' involvement in such diverse areas as banking, education, government and law.

Members hold administrative posts in most sectors of the business world. In New Zealand, over half the members are in industry and commerce, a third of them are in the company secretarial field, while the remainder are engaged in a wide variety of administrative and management roles. In the public sector, a high proportion are in local government. The qualification is widely respected in government service and other public sector organisations.

== Profile ==
There are two classes of membership of the institute, i.e. Fellows and Associates. All qualified members of the Institute are entitled to describe themselves as Chartered Secretaries and use the designatory letters, FCIS or ACIS as appropriate. Fellowship is the senior grade of membership. Another grade, Grad ICSA comprises those who have successfully completed the examinations, but have not yet gained sufficient qualifying service for Associateship.
