= Patrick Ayota =

Ugandan accountant and corporate executive

- Born: August 26, 1960 (age 66); Tororo, Uganda
- Education: Liberty University (Bachelor of Science); University of South Carolina (Master of Business Administration) (Certified Public Accountant)
- Occupations: Accountant and business administrator
- Years active: 1986—present
- Title: Managing director, National Social Security Fund Uganda; chairman, New Vision Group

Patrick Michael Ayota is a Ugandan accountant and corporate executive, who is the managing director of National Social Security Fund of Uganda, effective 18 August 2023. Between December 2022 and August 2023, he was CEO/managing director at NSSF Uganda, in acting capacity. His contract as MD/CEO runs until August 2028.

From 29 October 2017 until August 2023, he was the deputy managing director of NSSF Uganda. He is also the chairman of the New Vision Group, a media conglomerate, partly owned by the Government of Uganda.

== Background and education ==
He was born in Tororo District, in the Eastern Region of Uganda. He attended local Ugandan schools for his pre-university education. He studied at Liberty University in Lynchburg, Virginia, in the United States, graduating with a Bachelor of Science degree. Later, he was admitted to the University of South Carolina, at Columbia, graduating with a Master of Business Administration. He is also a certified public accountant, and a member of the Institute of Certified Public Accountants of Uganda.

== Career ==
Following his graduate studies, he took up residence in the Atlanta, Georgia area in the United States. He was employed at its Atlanta offices, by the Reznick Group, which today is CohnReznick, a large international accounting firm. In 2007, Ayota returned to Uganda and took up employment as the head of finance at Barclays Bank of Uganda (today Absa Bank Uganda Limited).

In 2010, Ayota left Barclays Bank and was hired by the National Social Security Fund of Uganda (NSSF Uganda), as the chief finance officer. In a search for new top management at NSSF Uganda, in June 2014, Ayota scored the highest marks for deputy Managing director. However, with the intervention of President Yoweri Museveni, a different top team was hired and Ayota remained head of finance at the institution. In October 2017, further changes were made to the NSSF board, and Ayota was named as substantive deputy managing director.

== Other considerations ==
During his stay in the United States, Ayota was an active member of the Ugandan community in North America, and was chief financial officer of the Ugandan North American Association (UNAA) from 2001 until 2002, and as the chairman of the UNAA Electoral Commission in 2005.

Effective 2016, he sits on the board of directors of the New Vision Group, as a non-executive director. He also sits on the board of Housing Finance Bank, Uganda's mortgage lender, where NSSF Uganda has 50 percent shareholding, also as a non-executive director.

== See also ==
- Uganda Retirement Benefits Regulatory Authority
- Ministry of Finance, Planning and Economic Development (Uganda)
