= DFCU House =

- Location within Kampala

General information
- Type: Commercial
- Location: 26 Kyaddondo Road; Kampala, Uganda
- Coordinates: 0.326668°N 32.582223°E
- Construction started: September 2011
- Completed: December 2013

Technical details
- Floor count: 10

Design and construction
- Architect: Symbion International

DFCU House (Note: DFCU House is also referred to as DFCU Tower.) is a building in Kampala, the capital and largest city of Uganda.

== Location ==
The building is located at 26 Kyaddondo Road, at the corner with Kafu Road, on Nakasero Hill, an upscale neighborhood in the central business district of Kampala. The coordinates of DFCU House are 0°19'36.0"N, 32°34'56.0"E (Latitude:0.326668; Longitude:32.582223).

== Overview ==
DFCU House houses the headquarters of DFCU Group and the main branch of DFCU Bank. As of December 2017, DFCU Bank was the second-largest commercial bank in Uganda by assets, with total assets in excess of UGX:3 trillion (US$800 million).

The building rises approximately 118.65 feet (36 m) above ground, with ten office floors. Space that is not used by the DFCU Group is available for rent to commercial tenants.

== History ==
DFCU Group, the parent company of DFCU Bank, had its headquarters offices scattered in several buildings in Kampala. In September 2011, construction began on a ten-story office complex on Nakasero Hill, to serve as the group's headquarters and house the main branch of the bank. Roko Construction Limited, a Ugandan construction company, was contracted to construct the building at an estimated cost of US$10 million (UGX:28 billion). Construction began in September 2011, with completion during the second half of 2013. As of June 2014, the construction was complete and occupancy was expected to take place in the second half of 2014. The office tower, valued at UGX:55 billion at that time, was officially dedicated as open in September 2015.

== See also ==
- List of banks in Uganda
- Banking in Uganda
- List of tallest buildings in Kampala
- Kampala Central Division
