= Climate Investment Funds =

Multilateral climate fund

The Climate Investment Funds (CIF) were established in 2008 as a multilateral climate fund in order to finance pilot projects in developing countries at the request of the G8 and G20. The CIF administers a collection of programs with a view of helping nations fight the impacts of climate change and accelerate their shift to a low-carbon economy.

Tariye Gbadegesin, a Nigerian-American national, is the current CEO of CIF. CIF works in partnership with governments, the private sector, civil society, local communities, and six major multilateral development banks (MDBs).

CIF investments are overseen by a governing board that provides equal authority to donor and recipient countries with input from official observers representing the private sector, civil society, and indigenous peoples.

CIF consists of two funds; the Clean Technology Fund and the Strategic Climate Fund.

== Clean Technology Fund ==
The World Bank is the Trustee of the CIFs, which works with most major multilateral development banks. In June 2019, the CIF governing board decided to indefinitely postpone its "sunset clause."

Solar thermal power provides a useful illustration because it shows promise as a renewable option for base load power. A recent study indicates that under a carbon pricing scheme with charges consistent with the low-end requirements for safe atmospheric carbon loading, public financing through the CTF Fund could close the cost gap between solar thermal and coal-fired power in a 5 to 10-year program that expands capacity at 500–1000 MW/year. Total Clean Technology Fund subsidies for this program would be $4 - 8 billion, easily within the range for a serious multilateral effort.

== Strategic Climate Fund ==
The Pilot Program for Climate Resilience (PPCR) is the first program under the Strategic Climate Fund. It seeks to explore practical ways to mainstream climate resilience into core development planning and budgeting that is consistent with poverty reduction and sustainable development goals. The PPCR will build on National Adaptation Programme of Action (NAPAs) and other national strategies and work in 11 pilot countries and regions. It is aligned with, and maintains links to, the Adaptation Fund established under the Kyoto Protocol.

The Scaling-Up Renewable Energy Program (SREP) in Low Income Countries, approved in May 2009, is aimed at demonstrating the economic, social and environmental viability of low carbon development pathways in the energy sector by creating new economic opportunities and increasing energy access through the use of renewable energy.

The Forest Investment Program (FIP), approved in May 2009, aims to support developing countries' efforts to reduce emissions from deforestation and forest degradation by providing bridge financing for readiness reforms and public and private investments. It will finance efforts to address the underlying causes of deforestation and forest degradation and overcome barriers that have hindered past efforts to do so.

== CTF-SCF Joint ==
The Climate-Smart Urbanization Program is an initiative by the Climate Investment Funds (CIFs) meant to support cities. The City Climate Finance Gap Fund assists cities in implementing infrastructure development projects that are low-carbon, pushing investments for climate and "green" objectives through technical help for early-stage planning and project preparation. The Gap Fund was launched during the 2019 UN Climate Action Conference and began operations in September 2020. It is sponsored by Germany and Luxembourg and implemented by the World Bank and the European Investment Bank.

== See also ==
- Climate finance
- International Renewable Energy Agency
- Renewable energy commercialization
