= Doris Akol =

Ugandan lawyer and administrator

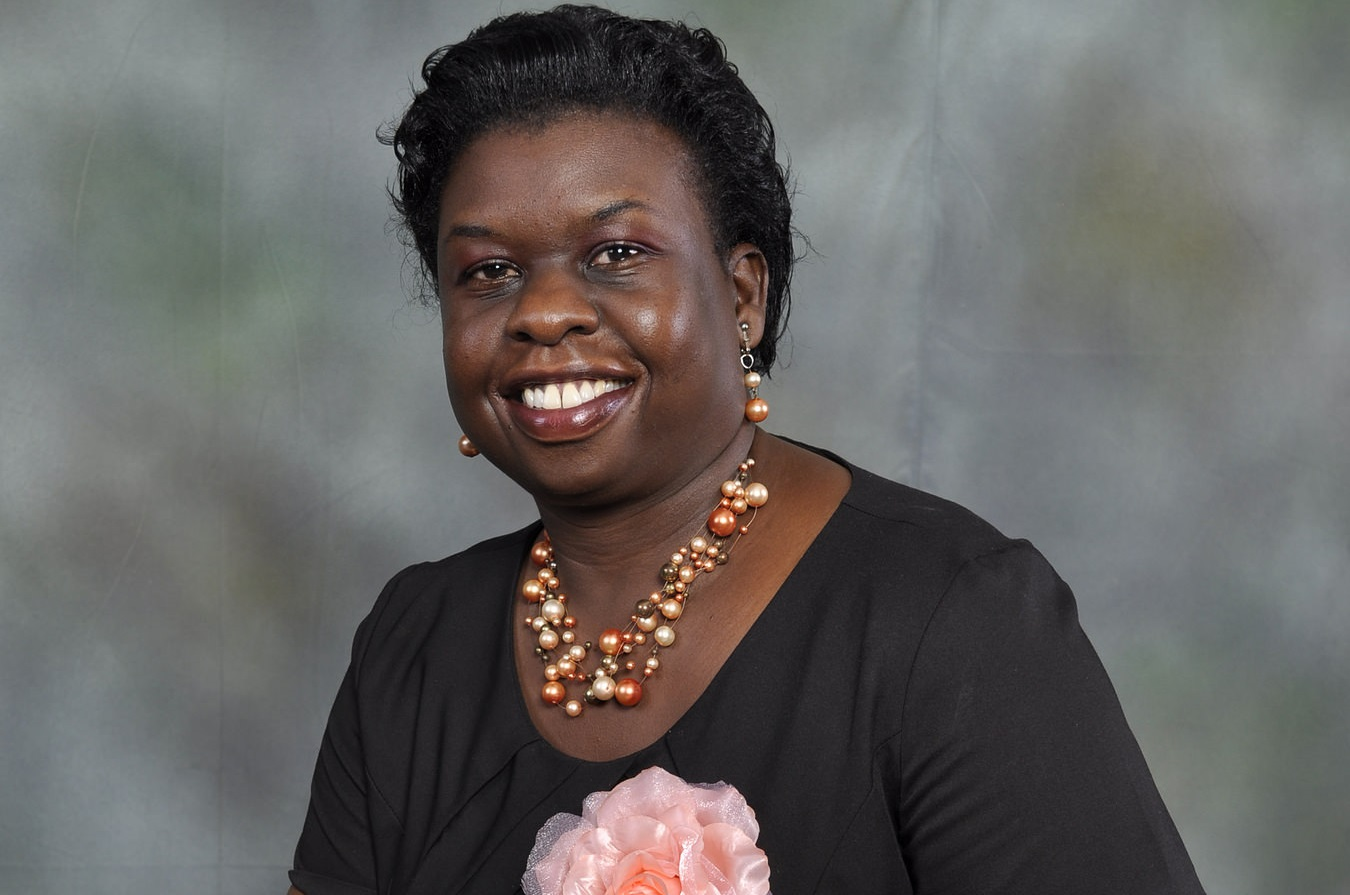
- Akol in 2020
- Born: 1970 (age 55–56); Uganda
- Citizenship: Uganda
- Education: Makerere University (LLB), (LLM); Law Development Centre (Diploma in Legal Practice); Uganda Management Institute (Diploma in Financial Management); McGill University (LLM)
- Occupation: Administrator
- Years active: 1994 — present
- Known for: Legal skill
- Title: Former Commissioner General; Uganda Revenue Authority

Doris Akol is a Ugandan lawyer and administrator. In December 2021, she was appointed as Technical Assistance Advisor at the International Monetary Fund, in Washington, DC, United States.

Before that, she was a partner at the Dentons' Kampala office. She is a former Commissioner General of the Uganda Revenue Authority. She was appointed to that position by Maria Kiwanuka, the Ugandan Minister of Finance, Planning and Economic Development, on 27 October 2014. She replaced Allen Kagina, who retired after two consecutive five-year terms.

== Education ==
Akol attended Nakasero Primary School. For her O-Level education, she studied at Mount Saint Mary's College Namagunga. She then attended Nabisunsa Girls Secondary School, for her A-Level studies. She holds the degree of Bachelor of Laws, obtained in 1993, from Makerere University, Uganda's oldest and largest public university. She also holds a postgraduate Diploma in Law Practice, obtained from the Law Development Centre, in Kampala. Her Diploma in Financial Management, was obtained from the Uganda Management Institute. She holds a degree of Master of Laws from Makerere University. Her second degree of Master of Laws was obtained from McGill University in Canada in 2001. She is a member of the Institute of Chartered Secretaries and Administrators.

== Work experience ==
Following her graduation from the Law Development Centre in 1994, Akol spent one year at PricewaterhouseCoopers, at their Kampala offices. In 1995, she joined the Uganda Revenue Authority as a legal officer. From 2012 until 2014, she was the Commissioner for Legal Services and Board Affairs at the authority. In that capacity, she also served as its legal secretary. In October 2014, she was appointed commissioner general at the Uganda Revenue Authority. She assumed office on 30 October 2014. On 29 March 2020, Akol was relieved of her duties at the authority and John Musinguzi Rujoki was named as her replacement.

== Awards ==
In September 2018, Akol received the African Women in Leadership Award, from the African Virtuous Women Awards Organisation, at a ceremony held at the Women Development Centre, Abuja, Nigeria's capital city, in recognition of her leadership qualities and achievements.

In March 2018, Akol received the 2018 Person of the Year Public Excellence Award, from African Leadership Magazine, in recognition of her leadership's contribution to growth and development.

In September 2014, Akol was awarded the Best Female Lawyer of the year. The Uganda Law Society’s Female Lawyers’ Committee held the first ever “Women In Law Awards” dinner on 19 September 2014 at the Serena Hotel Kampala. She was recognized as woman who achieved professional excellence in her field of law where she provided a forum for networking, educating, mentoring and information-sharing with women in the legal profession and the entire world.

== See also ==
- Uganda Revenue Authority
- Economy of Uganda
- Tariye Gbadegesin
