= DFCU Group =

Ugandan financial services company

- Type: Public; USE: DFCU
- Industry: Financial services
- Founded: 1964
- Headquarters: Kampala, Uganda
- Key people: William Irwin; Chairman; Elly Karuhanga; Director
- Products: Banking, Leasing, Investments
- Website: www.dfcugroup.com

The Development Finance Company of Uganda Group, commonly referred to as the DFCU Group, is a company operating in the financial and real estate sectors in Uganda.

== Overview ==
The Group is involved in retail banking, consumer lending, mortgage lending, development finance, medium and long-term lease financing as well as commercial real estate investments. DFCU was established in 1964 as a development finance company. In 2005 DFCU Group comprised the following subsidiaries:

- DFCU Limited
- DFCU Bank Limited
- DFCU Leasing Limited
- Rwenzori Properties Limited
- Nakasero Properties Limited

DFCU Limited is the holding company and it is listed on the Uganda Securities Exchange (USE), under the symbol DFCU.

== DFCU Stock ==
As of 31 December 2022, DFCU stock is owned by the following corporate entities and individuals:

DFCU Group Stock Ownership
Rank	Name of owner	Percentage ownership
1	Arise BV of Netherlands	58.70
2	SCB Mauritius A/C Investment Fund for Developing Countries	9.97
3	NSSF	7.56
4	Kimberlite Frontier Africa Naster Fund, L.P.	7.35
5	Nearly 3,800 Other Investors	16.42
	Total	100.00

== DFCU House ==
DFCU Group built its new headquarters, which house the main branch of DFCU Bank. The building is known as DFCU House and rises ten stories high. Located at 26 Kyaddondo Road, on Nakasero Hill, in Kampala's central business district, the development has underground and surface parking, as well as rentable, retail and office space on several levels.

== See also ==
- DFCU Bank
- Banking in Uganda
- List of tallest buildings in Kampala
