= Solomon Walusimbi =

Ugandan footballer (born 1999)

Walusimbi Solomon
Personal information
- Date of birth: 19 September 1999 (age 27)
- Place of birth: Mulago Hospital, Uganda
- Height: 1.76 m (5 ft 9 in)
- Position: Striker

Team information
- Current team: Maroons FC
- Number: 17

Youth career
- 2010–2016: Bugema Academy

Senior career*
Years	Team	Apps	(Gls)
2016–	Maroons FC	43	(21)
- * Club domestic league appearances and goals as of 15:05, 4 September 2018 (UTC)

Walusimbi Solomon (born 19 September 1999) is a Ugandan professional footballer who plays as a striker for Maroons FC in the Uganda Premier League.

== Club ==
=== Maroons FC ===
Walusimbi made his debut for Maroons FC on 15 September 2016 on the opening day of the 2016-17 Big League season against Paidha Black Angels at Bar Okoro stadium in Zombo district, and the match ended in a draw of 2-2. He scored his first goal for Maroons FC on 13 October 2016 in the 82nd minute against Bright Light FC, Maroons FC won 2-0. He scored his ninth goal of the campaign in with a 4-1 victory over Sporting United in the FUFA Big League. In the 2016/17 FUFA Big League finals, Walusimbi scored the winning goal for Maroons FC hence promoted as champions to Uganda Premier League 2017-2018. He scored a total of 9 goals for Maroons FC during the Big League campaign.

On 24 October 2017, Walusimbi made his Uganda premiership debut when he came in as a substitute in the 72nd minute for William Wadri and scored in the 78th minute against Masavu FC, Maroons FC won 1-0. In his first season of the Uganda Premier League, he scored five goals in 24 league matches.
