= Housing Finance Bank =

Commercial bank in Uganda

- Type: Private
- Industry: Financial services
- Founded: 1967; 59 years ago
- Headquarters: Investment House; 4 Wampewo Avenue; Kololo, Kampala, Uganda
- Key people: Josephine N. Mukumbya; Chairman; Michael Mugabi; CEO
- Products: Loans, checking, savings, investments, debit cards, mortgages
- Revenue: ▲Aftertax:UGX:85.4 billion (US$23.072 million) (2025)
- Total assets: UGX:2.70 trillion (US$729.457 million) (2025)
- Number of employees: 309 (2022)
- Website: Homepage

Housing Finance Bank (HFB) is a commercial bank in Uganda. It is one of the commercial banks licensed by Bank of Uganda, the national banking regulator.

== Overview ==
HFB is a full service retail bank that is primarily involved in mortgage banking. Founded in 1967 as a housing finance company, HFB became a fully licensed commercial bank in January 2008, having acquired a commercial banking license from the Bank of Uganda. The bank is the leading mortgage lender in the country, with approximately 60 percent of all Ugandan mortgage accounts. On 31 December 2023, the bank's assets were USh2.14 trillion (US$569.641 million). The bank made an after-tax profit of USh65.1 billion (US$16.37 million) in 2023. At that time, core capital was USh273.8 billion (approx. US$72.9 million). As of December 2023, as reported by the Nile Post Uganda, HFB's loan book was valued at Shs414.192 billion (approx. US$113.454 million, at that time). As of 31 December 2025, the bank has total assets of UGX:2.70 trillion (approx. US$729,456,840).

In August 2017, the two largest shareholders in the bank, the Uganda government and NSSF Uganda, each contributed $8.2 million (for a total of $16.4 million) in fresh capital, to boost the bank's ability to lend to more mortgage borrowers and improve the lender's liquidity.

== Ownership ==
HFB is owned by the Uganda National Social Security Fund (50.0 percent). The government of Uganda, through the Uganda Ministry of Finance, Planning and Economic Development, owns 49.18 percent. The remaining 0.82 percent is owned by the National Housing and Construction Company, a parastatal company jointly owned by the government of Uganda (51 percent) and the government of Libya (49 percent).

HFB had planned to list its shares on the Uganda Securities Exchange in 2012, however, those plans were postponed.

== Branch network ==
HFB maintains its corporate headquarters and main branch at its newly constructed headquarters building on Wampewo Avenue, on Kololo Hill. HFB's former main branch is located on Kampala Road.

Another branch within the Kampala central business district is located in Nakasero, across Nakasero Road from the Nigerian High Commission. There are two other branches in Kampala, one each in the suburbs of Namuwongo and Ntinda.

In February 2009, HFB opened a branch in Mbarara in western Uganda. In March 2009, HFB opened a branch in an area of Kampala known as Kikuubo. In June 2009, HFB opened a branch in Mbale, promising at the opening ceremony to launch Internet banking and rural mobile banking later in 2009. In July 2009, HFB opened a branch in Arua, its eighth in the country.

As of December 2022, HFB maintained branches at the following locations:

1. Kololo Head Office Branch, Investment House: 4 Wampewo Avenue, Kololo, Kampala Main Branch
2. Kampala Road Branch: 25 Kampala Road, Kampala
3. Namuwongo Branch: 38 Kisugu Road, Namuwongo, Kampala
4. Ntinda Branch: Ntinda Shopping Centre, 1 Kimera Road, Ntinda
5. Nakasero Branch: 34A Nakasero Road, Nakasero, Kampala
6. Kikuubo Branch: Muzinge Dry Cleaners Building, 15 Nakivubo Road, Kampala
7. Garden City Branch: Garden City Mall, 64–68, Yusuf Lule Road, Kampala
8. Ndeeba Branch: 94-96 Masaka Road, Ndeeba, Kampala
9. Lira Branch: 4 Bazaar Road, Lira
10. Gulu Branch: 26 Labwor Road, Gulu
11. Jinja Branch: Beamteks Plaza, 68 Main Street, Jinja
12. Mbarara Branch: Classic Hotel Building, 57 High Street, Mbarara
13. Mbale Branch: Bugisu Cooperative Union House, 2 Court Road, Mbale
14. Arua Branch: OB Plaza, 9-11 Adumi Road, Arua
15. Tororo Branch: 11 Mbale Road, Tororo
16. Mukono Branch: 51 Kampala Road, Mukono
17. Fort Portal Branch: 4 Kyebambe Road, Fort Portal
18. Nansana Service Centre: Njovu Estate, Head Office Building, 1158 Hoima Road, Nansana.

== Directors ==
Housing Finance Bank is governed by a nine-person board of directors of whom two are executive directors and seven are non-executive. The chairman of the board is Josephine N. Mukumbya, one of the non-executive directors.

== Executive management ==
Nicholas Okwir was the founding managing director of HFB. In April 2013, Mathias Katamba became managing director, succeeding the retiring Okwir. In October 2018, Katamba left and Michael Mugabi was named CEO in an acting capacity. There are eleven other senior managers with whom the managing director supervises the daily activities of the bank.

== Awards ==
In September 2024, HFB was announced as the winner of both the "Best Mortgage Loan Bank Uganda 2024" and the "Best Customer Service Bank Uganda 2024" at World Economic Magazine Awards 2024.

== See also ==
- List of banks in Uganda
- Banking in Uganda
- Patrick Ayota
- Sarah Walusimbi
