= Uganda Revenue Authority =

Revenue collection agency in Uganda

Coordinates: 00°19′48″N 32°37′10″E

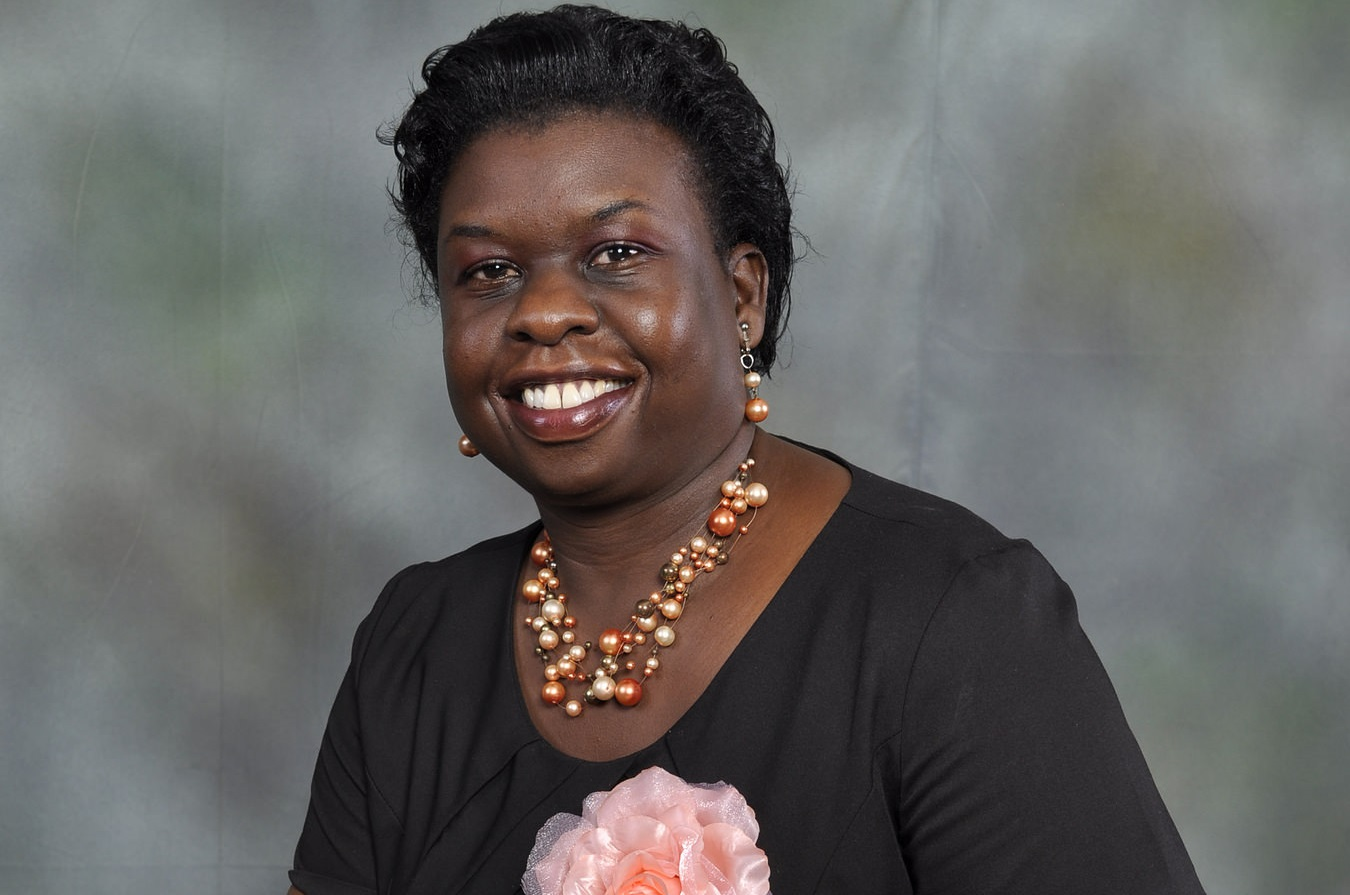

Agency overview
- Formed: 1991; 35 years ago
- Jurisdiction: Government of Uganda
- Headquarters: URA House, Nakawa, Kampala, Uganda
- Employees: 2,900+ (2015)
- Agency executives: Chairman, Juma Kisaame; Commissioner general, John Musinguzi Rujoki
- Parent agency: Uganda Ministry of Finance, Planning and Economic Development
- Website: www.ura.go.ug

The Uganda Revenue Authority (URA) is a government revenue collection agency established by the Parliament of Uganda. Operating under the Ministry of Finance, Planning and Economic Development, the URA is responsible for enforcing, assessing, collecting, and accounting for the various taxes imposed in Uganda.

== Location ==
URA's headquarters is located in a 22-storey skyscraper, known as Uganda Revenue Authority House (URA Tower), located at Plot M 193/4 Kinnawataka Road, Nakawa Industrial Area, in the Nakawa Division of Kampala, Uganda's capital and largest city. The site is about 6.5 kilometres (4 mi), by road, east of the city center. The coordinates of the agency's headquarters are 0°19'48.0"N 32°37'10.0"E (Latitude:0.330000; Longitude:32.619444).

== History ==
Allen Kagina was charged with eliminating corruption in the URA when she was appointed Commissioner General in 2004. Minister of Information Rose Namayanja said, "Under the leadership of Ms Allen Kagina, we have successfully cleaned URA and tax collections on a year-to-year basis have gone up. The situation is not as bad as it used to be." According to the Daily Monitor, this view was shared by the president of Uganda.

== Overview ==
In 1991, when URA was established, tax collection was 6.83% of GDP, amounting to UGX:133 billion. In 2015, taxes collected were 13% of GDP, amounting to UGX:11.2 trillion. URA targets to increase tax collection to at least 16% of GDP by 2020.

== Administration ==
On 29 March 2020, the President of the Republic of Uganda H.E. Gen. Yoweri Kaguta Museveni appointed John Musinguzi Rujoki as Commissioner General. He replaced lawyer Doris Akol who was appointed on 27 October 2014 by then Ugandan Finance Minister Maria Kiwanuka. Allen Kagina who served at the helm of the URA for two consecutive five-year terms prior to Doris Akol before retiring. To accommodate the majority of its staff in one location, URA built a 22-storey tower adjacent to its headquarters at Nakawa, completed in 2018, and officially commissioned in January 2019.

== Commissioner Generals ==
The table below illustrates the Commissioner Generals of the authority since its inception in 1991.

Commissioner Generals Uganda Revenue Authority Since Inception
Rank	Commissioner General	From	Until	Notes
1	Edward Larbi Siaw	1991	1997	
2	Elly Rwakakooko	1997	2000	
3	Stephen Besweri Akabway	2000	2001	In Acting capacity
4	Annebritt Aslund	2001	2004	
5	Allen Kagina	2004	2014	
6	Doris Akol	2014	2020	
7	John Musinguzi Rujoki	2020	present	

== Board of directors ==
The government agency is supervised by a seven-person board of directors, who are appointed by the Ugandan minister of finance. As of June 2020, the table below illustrates the composition of the URA Board of Directors.

Members of the Board of Directors of Uganda Revenue Authority
Rank	Namel	Role	Other Roles	Notes
1	Juma Kisaame	Chairman	Former CEO of DFCU Bank	
2	John Musinguzi Rujoki	Commissioner-general		
3	Patience Tumusiime Rubagumya	Board Secretary	URA Commissioner for Legal and Board Affairs	
4	Ramatham Ggobi	Secretary to Treasury	Permanent Secretary of Ministry of Finance	
5	Helen Awidi	Member		
6	Loy Tumusiime	Member		
7	Michael Wamibu	Member		

== See also ==
- URA House
- Economy of Uganda
- Ministry of Finance, Planning and Economic Development (Uganda)
