= National Social Security Fund (Uganda) =

Quasi-government agency

National Social Security Fund Uganda
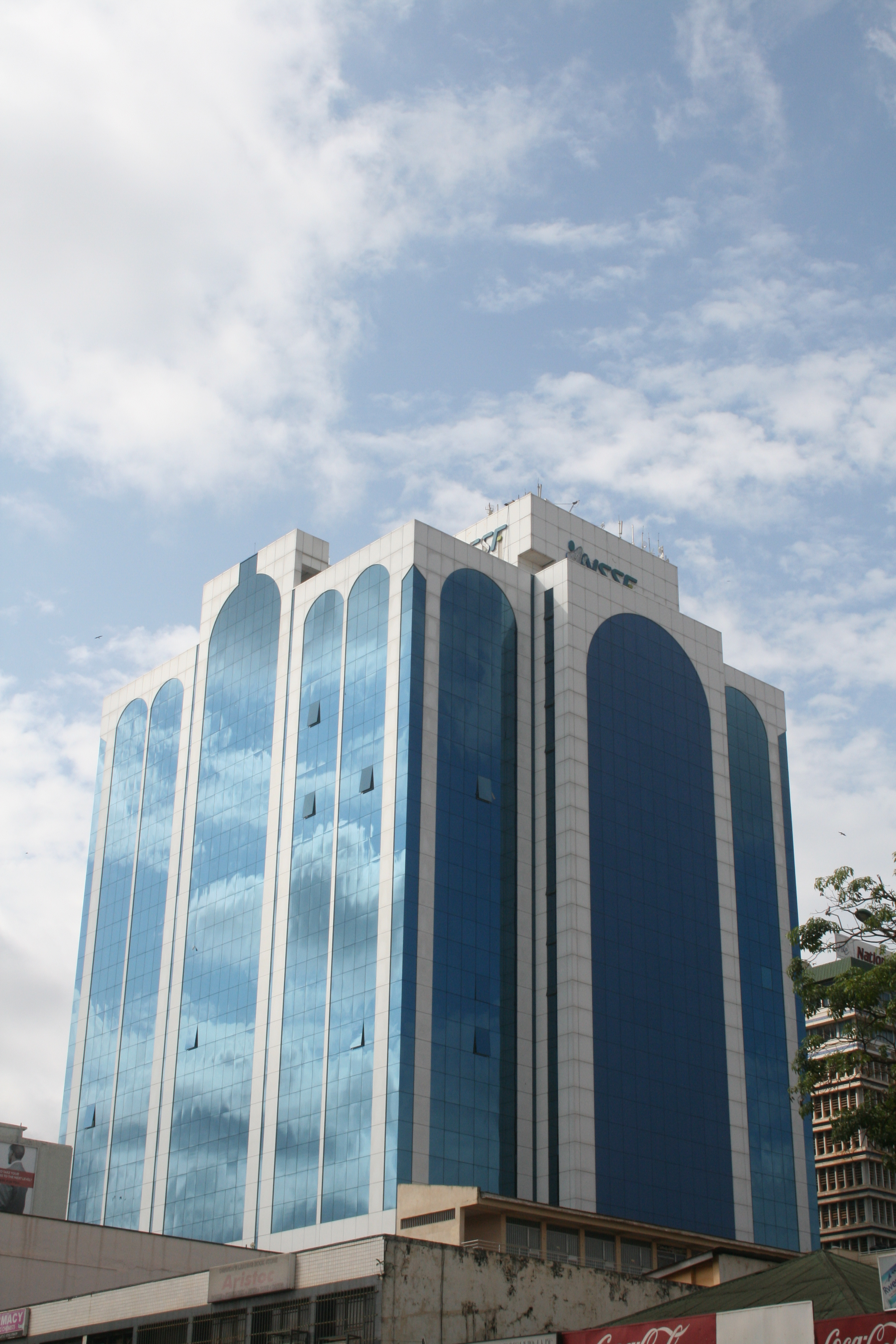
- NSSF Headquarters
- Native name: NSSF Uganda
- Type: Quasi-government
- Industry: Social Security
- Founded: 1985; 41 years ago
- Headquarters: 14th Floor Workers House; 1 Pilkington Road; Kampala, Uganda
- Key people: David Ogong; Chairman; Patrick Ayota; Managing Director; Gerald Kasaato; Deputy Managing Director.
- Products: Investments
- Revenue: ▲ Pretax:Sh3.52 trillion (US$1,001,440,000) (June 2025)
- Total assets: UGX:26 trillion (US$7.397 billion) (June 2025)
- Website: Homepage

The National Social Security Fund (NSSF; also NSSF Uganda), is a quasi-government agency responsible for the collection, safekeeping, responsible investment, and distribution of retirement funds from employees of the private sector in Uganda who are not covered by the Government Retirement Scheme. Participation for both employers and employees is compulsory. The Uganda National Social Security Fund is the largest pension fund in the countries of the East African Community, with total assets of USh26 trillion (approx. US$7.397 billion), as of June 2025.

== History ==
In February 2009, the President of Uganda fired the minister of finance, whose ministry supervises the activities of NSSF. Also terminated were the managing director of the NSSF. A new board of directors and a new management team were appointed in 2009.

In late 2010, NSSF underwent a restructuring process aimed at making it more efficient, competitive, and responsive to the needs of its members. It was then poised to provide a wide range of social security products and be the lead institution for domestic capital formation and deepening the financial sector. Analysts in the country said in 2013 that the NSSF had become a leading player in the country's economy.

In November 2024, NSSF management introduced a voluntary savings plan called The Smartlife Savings Plan, available to Ugandan citizens, legal non Ugandans and refugees. One has to be at least 16 years of age and authorized to work in Uganda. The minimum investment is USh 5,000 (approx. US$1.37).

== Investment portfolio ==
In July 2018, the fund's investments included (a) fixed income investments, accounting for 77 percent of all investments (b) equities on the security exchanges of the East African countries, accounting for 17 percent and (c) real estate investments, which are 6 percent of the total portfolio.

Significant real estate holdings include Workers' House in the centre of Kampala, Uganda's capital city, where NSSF maintains its head office, and City House Jinja, in Jinja, developed between 2015 and 2018, at a cost of USh3.5 billion (approx. US$1 million).

According to its financial statements for the year ending 30 June 2014, NSSF had UGX:2.65 trillion in government treasury bonds (with yields ranging from 10.25 to 14.35 percent), UGX:682.1 billion on deposit with commercial banks, UGX:251.3 billion in equity investments at fair value through profit or loss (EPL), UGX:250.2 billion in capital work-in-progress, UGX:193.7 billion in investment properties, UGX:143.2 billion in corporate bonds (with yields ranging from 11.03 to 17.00 percent), UGX:73.3 billion in equity securities held-for-trading by fund managers (HFT), and UGX:14.6 billion in cash and bank balances. Based on market value as of 30 June 2014, NSSF's largest investments in equity securities were as follows:

- Safaricom: UGX:89.7 billion (EPL)
- Umeme: UGX:88.1 billion (EPL)
- Stanbic Bank Uganda Limited: UGX:31.4 billion (EPL)
- DFCU Limited: UGX:18.0 billion (EPL)
- New Vision Group: UGX:9.0 billion (EPL)
- Tanzania Breweries Limited: UGX:7.04 billion (HFT)
- East African Breweries Limited: UGX:6.16 billion (HFT)
- Bank of Baroda Uganda Limited: UGX:5.74 billion (EPL)
- Diamond Trust Bank: UGX:5.63 billion (HFT)
- BAT Kenya Limited: UGX:5.57 billion (HFT)
- Centum Investments Limited: UGX:5.19 billion (EPL)
- Safaricom: UGX:4.90 billion (HFT)
- Kenya Commercial Bank: UGX:4.09 billion (HFT)
- Equity Bank Kenya Limited: UGX:3.97 billion (HFT)
- DFCU Bank: UGX:3.32 billion (HFT)
- CfC Stanbic Holdings: UGX:3.02 billion (HFT)
- Nation Media Group: UGX:2.91 billion (HFT)
- Equity Bank Group: UGX:2.78 billion (EPL)
- NIC Bank Limited: UGX:2.86 billion (HFT)
- Stanbic Bank Uganda Limited: UGX:2.84 billion (HFT)

== Operations and economic performance ==
The NSSF is a defined contribution scheme and is financed largely by contributions from employers and employees. The total contribution is equal to 15 percent of an employee's gross salary, with the employer contributing 10 percent and the employee 5 percent. The NSSF pays five types of benefits:

- Age benefit – paid to a member who has reached the retirement age of 55
- Withdrawal benefit: Paid to a member who has reached the age of 50 and is out of regular employment for one year
- Invalidity benefit: Paid to a member who has become incapable of gainful employment
- Survivor's benefit: Paid to the dependent survivor of a member
- Emigration grant: Paid to a member who is leaving Uganda permanently.

The NSSF's total assets as of 30 June 2014, were valued at UGX:4.4 trillion. In October 2017, The Independent, a Ugandan English language newspaper, estimated the NSSF total assets at USh7.9 trillion (approximately US$2.48 billion at that time), as of 30 June 2017. By June 2018, those assets had increased to USh9.98 trillion ($2.678 billion). As of 30 June 2020, NSSF Uganda managed a total asset portfolio of USh13.38 trillion ($3.627 billion). This was a 17 percent increase from UGX11.3 trillion ($3.064 billion), as of 30 June 2019. As of June 2021, NSSF Uganda controlled UGX:15.5 trillion (US$4.406 billion) in total assets. NSSF Uganda controlled total assets valued at UGX:18.58 trillion (US$4.981 billion), as of 30 June 2023. As of 30 June 2024 total assets under management were USh22.13 trillion (US$6.065 billion). As of 30 June 2025, total assets were UGX26 trillion (approx. US$7.397 billion

=== Historical total assets ===
Year	Total Assets (UGX)	% Increase
2014	4,400,000,000,000	—
2017	7,900,000,000,000	+79.5%
2018	9,800,000,000,000	+24.1%
2019	11,300,000,000,000	+15.3%
2020	13,380,000,000,000	+18.4%
2021	15,500,000,000,000	+15.8%
2023	18,580,000,000,000	+19.9%
2024	22,130,000,000,000	+19.1%
2025	26,000,000,000,000	+17.5%
2026	32,800,000,000,000	+26.2%

== Pension Towers ==
Beginning in the early 2000s, NSSFU has been developing an office complex known as Pension Towers, along Lumumba Avenue, on Nakasero Hill, one of the most prestigious neighborhoods in Kampala, Uganda's capital city. The complex consists of three interconnected towers; one central tower of twenty-five stories in height, flanked on either side by a ten-story tower. Roko Construction Company, a Ugandan construction company constructed the four basement floors between 2008 and 2012, but failed to qualify for further works on the project. Three Chinese firms are in a final bidding process to complete the construction, between 2012 and 2015. Construction costs for the complex are estimated at UGX:260 billion. When finished, the three towers will contain in excess of 59,410 square metres (639,500 ft^{2}) in office space. Parking for over 500 vehicles will be provided in the development.

== City House Jinja ==
Jinja City House is owned by the Uganda National Social Security Fund (NSSF), who developed the building, between 2015 and 2018. The building houses the NSSF offices in Jinja and the remaining space is rented out to qualified businesses and corporations. The mixed use building consists of 1,500 square metres (16,146 sq ft) on four floors, of which 1,200 square metres (12,917 sq ft) are rentable. NSSF will occupy the remaining 300 square metres (3,229 sq ft).

== NSSF Mbarara Complex ==
Mbarara City House, is the second NSSF real estate investment outside the capital city of Kampala. It was developed at a cost of USh3.9 billion (approximately US$1.2 million), between 2017 and 2019.

== Governance ==
=== Board of directors ===
Ugandan Minister of Finance Matia Kasaija appointed a new board of directors in September 2023, composed of the following members:

1. David Ogong: Chairman
2. Aggrey David Kibenge
3. Silver Mugisha
4. Ramathan Ggoobi
5. Annet Birungi
6. Patrick Ayota: Managing Director and CEO.
7. Peninnah Tukamwesiga
8. Sam Lyomoki
9. Annet Mulindwa Nakawunde
10. Richard Bigirwa

=== Management ===
The management of the NSSF consisted of the following individuals as of September 2023:

- Patrick Ayota: Managing Director
- Gerald Kasaato: Deputy Managing Director
- Agnes Tibayeyita Isharaza: Corporation Secretary
- Geoffrey Barigye: Head of Internal Audit
- Barbara Teddy Arimi: Head of Marketing & Communications
- Stevens Mwanje: Chief Finance Officer
- Edward Ssenyonjo: Head of Enterprise Risk
- Geoffrey Ssajjabi: Chief Commercial Officer
- Milton Owor: Chief People and Culture Officer
- Benoni Katende: Chief Technology and Enterprise Solutions Officer

== Branch network ==
As of June 2019, NSSF had a branch network of 19 branches in the central, eastern, northern, and western parts of Uganda, with six in Kampala, the capital.

1. Head Office: Workers House, One Pilkington Road, Kampala
2. Bugoloobi Branch: Bugoloobi
3. Kireka Branch: Kireka
4. Entebbe Branch: Entebbe
5. Kawempe Branch: Kawempe
6. Bakuli Branch: Bakuli
7. Arua Branch: Arua
8. Gulu Branch: Gulu
9. Lira Branch: Lira
10. Soroti Branch: Soroti
11. Mbale Branch: Mbale
12. Jinja Branch: City House Jinja, Jinja
13. Lugazi Branch: Lugazi
14. Masaka Branch: Masaka
15. Masindi Branch: Masindi
16. Hoima Branch: Hoima
17. Fort Portal Branch: Fort Portal
18. Mbarara Branch: NSSF Mbarara Complex, Mbarara
19. Kabale Branch: Kabale

== See also ==
- Bank of Uganda
- Economy of Uganda
- Insurance Regulatory Authority of Uganda
- Uganda Retirement Benefits Regulatory Authority
- Uganda Revenue Authority
- List of tallest buildings in Kampala
