= DFCU Bank =

Commercial bank in Uganda

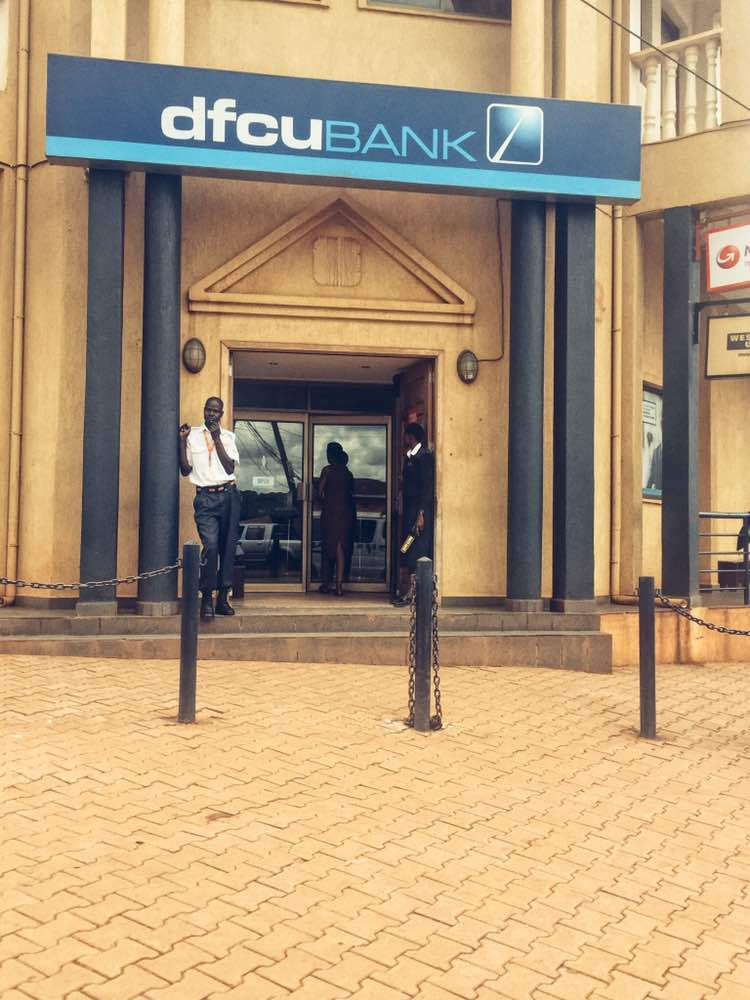
- Ntinda branch
- Type: Public; Parent DFCU Limited listed on Uganda Securities Exchange as DFCU
- Industry: Financial services
- Founded: 1964; 62 years ago
- Headquarters: 26 Kyaddondo Road; Nakasero, Kampala, Uganda
- Key people: Jimmy D. Mugerwa, chairman Charles Mudiwa, managing director
- Products: Loans, checking accounts, savings, investments, debit cards, credit cards, mortgages
- Revenue: ▲Aftertax:UGX:72 billion (US$19.8 million) (2024)
- Total assets: UGX:3.4 trillion (US$934.6 million) (2024)
- Number of employees: 1,174 (2022)
- Website: www.dfcugroup.com

DFCU Bank, registered as the Development Finance Company of Uganda Bank Limited, is a commercial bank in Uganda. It is licensed by the Bank of Uganda (BoU), Uganda's central bank and national banking regulator.

== Overview ==
As of December 2022, DFCU Bank had total assets of UGX:3.283 trillion (US$893.78 million), and shareholders' equity of UGX:614.5 billion (US$167.3 million).

As of 30 June 2017, DFCU Bank operated 67 branches and 100 automated teller machines. As of 31 December 2024, the bank's total assets had increased to UGX:3.4 trillion (US$934.6 million). In calendar year 2024, the bank realized profit after tax (PAT) of UGX72 billion (US$19.8 million).

== History ==
The Development Finance Company of Uganda Limited was established in 1964, with its name changing in 2000 to DFCU Limited and eventually to dfcu Limited. In 2000, dfcu Limited acquired Gold Trust Bank, which subsequently became DFCU Bank.

In July 2014, the BoU transferred to DFCU Bank the customer deposits of the Global Trust Bank, a small retail financial institution that the BoU had closed because it never became commercially viable. The deposits were valued at UGX:73 billion.

On 27 January 2017, DFCU Bank took over Crane Bank, which had been under the statutory management of the BoU because Crane's liabilities exceeded its assets. The acquisition included all customer deposit accounts and some loan accounts.

== Ownership and affiliation ==
The stock of DFCU Limited, the parent company of DFCU Bank, trades on the Uganda Securities Exchange under the symbol "DFCU". As of December 2018, the major shareholders in the stock were as outlined in the table below:

DFCU Limited stock ownership
| Rank | Name of owner | Percentage ownership |
|---|---|---|
| 1 | Arise BV | 58.70 |
| 2 | Investment Fund for Developing Countries (IFU) | 9.97 |
| 3 | National Social Security Fund of Uganda | 7.46 |
| 4 | Kimberlite Frontier Africa Naster Fund | 7.35 |
| 5 | SSB Russell Investment Company Plc Fund NAS5 | 1.93 |
| 6 | National Social Security Fund - PineBridge | 1.31 |
| 7 | Vanderbilt University | 0.98 |
| 8 | SSB-Conrad N. Hilton Foundation | 0.97 |
| 9 | Jubilee Investment Company Limited | 0.76 |
| 10 | Bank of Uganda Defined Benefits Scheme - Sanlam | 0.60 |
| 11 | Bank of Uganda Defined Benefits Scheme - Stanlib | 0.59 |
| 12 | The Parliament Pension Scheme - Stanlib | 0.39 |
| 13 | Uganda Revenue Authority Staff Retirement Benefits | 0.38 |
| 14 | Centenary Bank Staff Defined Contributory Scheme | 0.38 |
| 15 | Makerere University Retirement Benefits Scheme | 0.31 |
| 16 | Sudhir Ruparelia | 0.29 |
| 17 | Rakesh Gadani | 0.26 |
| 18 | UAP Insurance Company Limited | 0.22 |
| 19 | Jubilee Insurance Company Limited | 0.21 |
| 20 | Housing Finance Bank/UAP Insurance General Life Fund | 0.21 |
| 21 | 3,807 other tnvestors | 6.72 |
| | Total | 100.00 |

- DFCU Bank is a subsidiary of DFCU Limited.
- Arise BV is a special purpose vehicle company, formed in 2016 and co-owned by Norfund, the Netherlands Development Finance Company, and Rabobank. Arise invests in African financial institutions.
- In July 2018, the New Vision newspaper in Uganda reported that CDC Group had indicated its desire to exit the investment.

== Branch network ==
With its headquarters in Kampala, DFCU Bank had the following branches in all areas of Uganda as of April 2020. In February 2020, the bank relocated 15 of its branches to new premises, as listed below.

- Sixth Street Branch: Ramzam Motors Building, Plot 116/118, Sixth Street, Industrial Area, Kampala
- Abayita Ababiri Branch: S&S Mall, Plot. 863, Nkumba
- Abim Branch: 8 Lira-Kotido Road, Abim
- Bugoloobi Branch: Kagga House, 2 Bandali Rise, Bugoloobi, Kampala
- Bwaise Branch: 975-976 Sir Apollo Kaggwa Road, Bwaise, Kampala
- Entebbe Road Branch: Freedom City Mall, Namasuba, Kampala
- Impala House Branch: Impala House, 13 Kimathi Avenue, Kampala
- Jinja Road Branch: Victoria University Towers, 38 Jinja Road, Kampala
- Kampala Road Branch: Plot. 40, Kampala Road, Kampala
- Sun City Branch: Sun City Plaza, 17 Ben Kiwanuka Street, Kampala
- Kawempe Branch: Kampala-Gulu Highway, Kawempe, Kampala
- Kikuubo Branch: Ddembe Plaza, Nakivubo Road, Kampala
- Kireka Branch: Isabella Plaza, Plot. 395, Kireka
- Kisekka Branch: Kisekka Market, 70 – 76 Nakivubo Road, Kampala
- Kyadondo Road Branch - DFCU House, 26 Kyaddondo Road, Nakasero, Kampala (main branch)
- Kyambogo University Branch: Kyambogo University, Kyambogo, Kampala
- Kyambogo Branch: 48/50, Mukabya Road, Kyambogo, Kampala
- Lugogo Branch: Lugogo Mall, Lugogo Bypass Road, Lugogo, Kampala
- Makerere Branch: 45 Pool Road, Makerere University Campus, Kampala
- Market Street Branch: Aponye City Mall, 8 Burton Street, Kampala
- Naalya Branch: Quality Shopping Mall, Naalya
- Nakivubo Branch (Gagawala Shauliyako): 40A, Nakivubo Place, Kampala
- Acacia Branch: 24 Acacia Avenue, Kololo, Kampala
- Agago Branch: 1 Odok Road, Agago Town Council
- Arua Branch: OB Plaza, Plot. 9 & 11, Adumi Road, Arua
- Busia Branch: 101 & 103 Customs Road, Busia, Uganda
- Dokolo Branch: Akeidebe Zone, Bata Road, Dokolo
- Entebbe Town Branch: 22 Kampala Road, Entebbe
- Gulu Branch: 1 Doctor Lucile Road, Gulu
- Gulu University Branch: DFI Block, University Avenue, Gulu University Campus, Gulu
- Hoima Branch: Plot. 36, Main Street, Main Street, Hoima
- Ibanda Branch: Plot. 82, Kamwenge Road, Ibanda
- Iganga Branch: 80 & 82 Main Street, Iganga
- Ishaka Branch: 45 Ishaka-Rukungiri Road, Ishaka
- Isingiro Branch: 36 Kikagate Road, Isingiro
- IUIU Branch: Islamic University in Uganda Campus, Mbale
- Jinja Branch: Plot. 10 Scindia/Lady Alice Muloki Road, Jinja
- Kabale Branch: 143/145 Kabale Road, Kabale
- Kisoro Branch: 65/75 North Ward, Kisoro
- Kitgum Branch: 19 Janan Luwum Street, Kitgum
- Kyengera Branch: Kyengera Shell Service Station, Masaka Road, Kyengera
- Luweero Branch: 846 Kampala–Gulu Highway, Luweero
- Luwum Street Branch: Kizito Towers, Luwum Street, Kampala
- Lyantonde Branch: Plot. 226, Block. 76, Lyantonde
- Masaka Branch: 22 Kampala Road, Masaka
- Mbale Branch: 2 Court Road, Mbale
- Mbarara Branch: Plot. 14, Masaka–Mbarara Road, Mbarara
- Mukono Branch: 18/20 Jinja Road, Mukono
- Nateete Branch: 757 Wakaliga, Nateete, Kampala
- Ndeeba Branch: 224 Masaka Road, Ndeeba, Kampala
- Nsambya Branch: 1207 Ggaba Road, Nsambya, Kampala
- Ntinda Branch 1: Capital Shoppers City, Ntinda Road, Ntinda, Kampala
- Ntinda Branch 2: Plot. 1615 Tuskys Supermarket Building, Ntinda–Bukoto Road, Ntinda, Kampala
- Ntungamo Branch: 18 Old Kabale Road, Ntungamo
- Owino Market Branch - 769 Kafumbe Mukasa Road, Kampala
- Pader Branch: 8 Lagwai Zone B, Pader
- Pallisa Branch: 8 Kasodo Road, Pallisa
- Rushere Branch: 52–54 Rushere Road, Rushere
- Soroti Branch: Jovi House, Plot. 47 Gweri Road, Soroti
- Tororo Branch: 9 & 11 Mbale Road, Tororo
- William Street Branch: 66 William Street, Kampala
- Wilson Lane Branch: 17 Wilson Lane, Kampala

== DFCU House ==
DFCU Limited has built a ten-story headquarters building that also houses the main branch of DFCU Bank. The building is often referred to as DFCU House. Located at 26 Kyaddondo Road, on Nakasero Hill, in Kampala's central business district, the development has underground and surface parking, as well as rentable, retail, and office space on several levels.

== See also ==
- Banking in Uganda
- List of banks in Uganda
- List of tallest buildings in Kampala
- Asset allocation among commercial banks in Uganda
