= Eastern and Southern African Management Institute =

Regional management institute established in 1980

Eastern and Southern African Management Institute (ESAMI)
- Type: Intergovernmental Organisation
- Established: 1979
- President: Dr. Peter Kiuluku; Acting Director General
- Doctoral students: N/A
- Location: Arusha, Tanzania, Arusha, Tanzania
- Website: Institute Website

The ESAMI logo

Eastern and Southern African Management Institute, or ESAMI is a diplomatic regional management development institute owned by various governments in the Sub-Saharan Africa region. Established in 1980, the Institute has its headquarters in Arusha, Tanzania.

== History ==
ESAMI was established in 1979 on the foundations of the East African Management Institute. It was established by the governments of Kenya, the United Republic of Tanzania and the Republic of Uganda, as an intergovernmental institution designed to provide specialized top-level management training, research and consultancy services to its members.

The charter establishing ESAMI was signed in October 1979, by the member countries of Kenya, Mozambique, Malawi, Namibia, Tanzania, Uganda, Seychelles, Swaziland, Zambia and Zimbabwe. This charter was endorsed by the executive secretary of the United Nations Economic Commission for Africa.

== Academic programmes ==
As of April 2015, ESAMI offers 8 Master of Business Administration programmes and training in the following academic disciplines:

1. Master's in entrepreneurship
2. Master of Public Administration
3. Master of Business Administration – general
4. MBA in human resource management
5. MBA in customs management
6. MBA in transport economics and logistics management
7. Diploma in management and administration
8. Diploma in human resources management

== Study centers ==
ESAMI courses can be taken at study centers in the following cities:

1. Arusha, Tanzania
2. Dar es Salaam, Tanzania
3. Nairobi, Kenya
4. Kampala, Uganda
5. Lusaka, Zambia
6. Lilongwe, Malawi
7. Harare, Zimbabwe
8. Maputo, Mozambique
9. Mbabane, Swaziland
10. Windhoek, Namibia

== Distinctions ==
In May 1997, the United Nations Economic Commission for Africa officially designated ESAMI as "The African Centre of Excellence in Management Development."
