= Chartered Governance Institute =

Professional organization

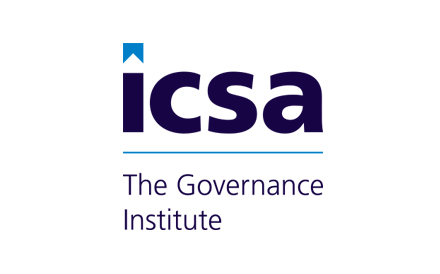
- Type: Professional body
- Founded: 1891
- Headquarters: Saffron House, 6-10 Kirby Street, London EC1N 8TS, United Kingdom
- Website: www.cgi.org.uk

The Chartered Governance Institute, previously known as the Institute of Chartered Secretaries and Administrators (ICSA), is a qualifying and membership body for company secretaries and governance professionals operating in several common law jurisdictions.

The organisation has divisions in Australia, Canada, Hong Kong, China, Malaysia, New Zealand, Singapore, South Africa, Zimbabwe, the United Kingdom, and Ireland.

The division based in London is known as the Chartered Governance Institute UK & Ireland. It represents and supports members in the United Kingdom, Ireland, Crown Dependencies, and associated territories, including the Caribbean, sub-Saharan Africa, the Middle East, Mauritius, and Sri Lanka.

The ICSA has 38 branches and maintains affiliations with organizations like the Worshipful Company of Chartered Secretaries and Administrators. The Chartered Governance Institute is a member of the CBI, ECODA, and the Professional Associations Research Network (PARN), and is a founding member of the Next Generation NED Network.

== History ==
Founded in London in 1891 as the Institute of Secretaries, the organisation was initially formed to represent the interests of corporate secretaries, who had emerged to govern the administration of joint stock companies following the introduction of limited liability in 1855. A royal charter was granted in 1902 and the organisation became known as the Chartered Institute of Secretaries of Joint-Stock Companies and Other Public Bodies. By 1911, the organisation reportedly had 3,544 members.

The Women's Corporate Governance Association was founded in response to a resolution by the Council of the Chartered Institute of Secretaries which explicitly banned women from joining the institute. This was rescinded in 1916 and the Institute of Secretaries admitted its first female associate in 1917. A "women's society" was formed, by female members of the institute, in 1922.

In 1970, the Institute of Secretaries merged with the Corporation of Secretaries and became the Institute of Chartered Secretaries and Administrators (ICSA) in 1971. By 2018, the organisation reportedly had "over 30,000 members in over 80 countries". In 2019, ICSA was renamed as the Chartered Governance Institute.

== Education ==
The Chartered Governance Institute provides qualifications in governance and awards post-nominals. The post-nominals awarded for chartered membership are Fellow (FCG/FCIS) and Associate (ACG/ACIS). For professional and part-qualified membership, the post-nominal is CG (Affiliated). Graduate members can use the post-nominal Grad CG or Grad ICSA.

The Chartered Governance Qualifying Program (CGQP) is the institute's flagship qualification and the most common route to graduate status and chartered membership in the institute. A person who has completed the CGQP and satisfies the prescribed working experience requirement is eligible for election as an associate or fellow of the institute. Associates and fellows are entitled to use the designation "Chartered Secretary" or "Chartered Governance Professional" or both, depending on the modules they have completed as part of the CGQP. "Chartered Secretary" and the post-nominal "ACIS" are listed in the European Union (Recognition of Professional Qualifications) Regulations 2015, schedule 1, part 2 (Professions Regulated by Professional Bodies Incorporated by Royal Charter), thus making chartered secretaries a regulated profession. Both Chartered Secretary and Chartered Governance Professional are designations approved by the Privy Council of the United Kingdom.

In addition to the courses offered by the division based in London, courses and qualifications are also provided across other divisions. Memoranda of understanding are in place with the Institute of Company Secretaries of India (ICSI) and The Institute of Chartered Secretaries and Administrators of Nigeria (ICSAN).

== Charities Act 2011 ==
The Chartered Governance Institute is one of eleven professional bodies whose members are allowed by the Charities Act 2011 in the UK to conduct independent examination of charities whose gross income exceeds £250,000 but is not otherwise subject to statutory audit.

== See also ==
- Chartered Secretaries New Zealand
- Chartered Secretaries (Hong Kong)
- Governance Institute of Australia
