= Company secretary =

Senior managerial position

Company Secretary
Occupation
- Names: Company Secretary (UK/Ireland/India); Corporate Secretary (USA/Canada); Secretary (Australia/New Zealand)
- Occupation type: Corporate Officer, Profession
- Activity sectors: All sectors

Description
- Related jobs: Company Director; General Counsel

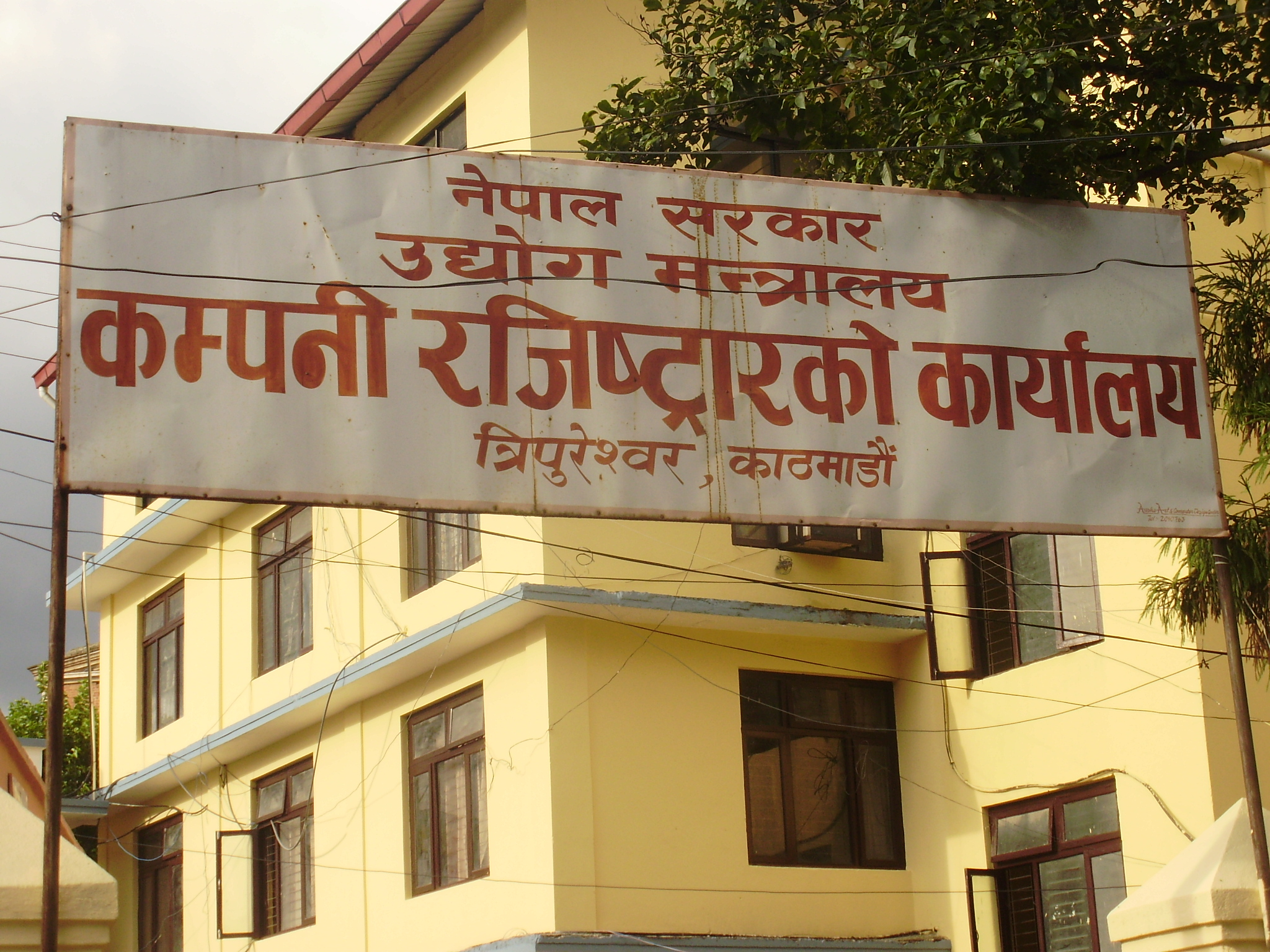
Office of the Company Registrar in Nepal

A company secretary occupies a senior position in the corporate governance of an organization, playing a crucial role in its ensuring adherence to statutory and regulatory requirements. This position is integral to the efficient functioning of corporations, particularly in common law jurisdictions. The company secretary serves as a guardian of compliance, a facilitator of communication between the board of directors and other stakeholders, and a custodian of corporate records.

Despite the name, the role is not clerical or secretarial. The company secretary ensures that an organisation complies with relevant legislation and regulation, and keeps board members informed of their legal responsibilities.

In many countries, private companies are required by law to appoint one person as a company secretary, and this person will either be a senior board member or a member of the Senior management team or a key managerial personnel.

== Roles and responsibilities ==
Company secretaries in all sectors have high level responsibilities including governance structures and mechanisms, corporate conduct within an organisation's regulatory environment, board, shareholder and trustee meetings, compliance with legal, regulatory and listing requirements, the training and induction of non-executives and trustees, contact with regulatory and external bodies, reports and circulars to shareholders/trustees, management of employee benefits such as pensions and employee share schemes, insurance administration and organisation, the negotiation of contracts, risk management, property administration and organisation and the interpretation of financial accounts.

Company secretaries are the primary source of advice on the conduct of business and this can span everything from legal advice on conflicts of interest, through accounting advice on financial reports, to the development of strategy and corporate planning.

=== China ===
In China, every listed company is required to have a board secretary. According to article 124 of 2005 Company Law, every listed company is required to have a secretary to the board of directors. The responsibilities of board secretary include preparing meetings of shareholders and boards of directors, maintaining company records and shareholders information, dealing with information disclosure etc. Relevant listing rules in China further clarify that the secretary of the Board is a managerial position. Such listing rules discuss duties of board secretary in details. According to "Special Provisions of the State Council Concerning the Flotation and Listing Abroad of Stocks by Limited Stock Companies", "Guidance for the Articles of Listed Company", "Stock Listing Rules of the Shanghai Stock Exchange" and "Stock Listing Rules of the Shenzhen Stock Exchange", the secretary of the Board is classified as the senior management team. From those listing rules, the board secretary, or the secretary of the board of directors, in China is comparable as the company secretary in many other countries.

=== India ===
In India, "The Institute of Company Secretaries of India" (ICSI) regulates the profession of company secretaries. The ICSI is a statutory professional body which has over 70,000 associate members. Additionally, ICSI has over 200,000 students registered for the company secretary course. India is projected to need around 100,000 company secretaries by 2030.

Chartered Secretaries are employed as chairs, chief executives and non-executive directors, as well as executives and company secretaries. Some chartered secretaries are also known in their own companies as corporate secretarial executives/managers or corporate secretarial directors.

=== Ireland ===
All companies registered under the Companies Act 2014 are required to appoint a company secretary, who may also be a company director.

The company secretary of a private limited company must have "the skills or resources necessary to discharge his or her statutory and other duties", while that of a public limited company must meet two out of the three following criteria before appointment:

- For at least 3 years of the 5 years immediately preceding his / her appointment as secretary, the person held the office of secretary of a company.
- be a member of a professional body recognised for such purposes by the Minister for Jobs, Enterprise and Innovation (such as the Chartered Governance Institute)
- appear to the directors of the PLC to be capable of discharging the required duties, by virtue of holding or having held another position, or membership of another body.

Although the Company Secretary is an officer of the company, the Companies Acts do not expressly state the duties of a secretary.

The following statutory duties are commonly, but not exclusively, undertaken by the Company Secretary:

- Maintaining the statutory registers and minute books
- Convening meetings of members
- Ensuring that statutory forms are completed and filed on time in the Companies Registration Office
- Delivering to the Companies Registration Office copies of resolutions passed by the company
- Supplying a copy of the company’s financial statements to every member of the company, every debenture holder and every person who is entitled to receive notice of general meetings
- Keeping or arranging for the keeping of minutes of directors’ meeting and general meetings
- Ensuring that those entitled to do so may inspect company records
- Custody and use of the company seal
- Ensuring that company complies with its obligation to publish its name
- Ensuring that particulars relating to directors are shown on all business letters of the company.

The following non-statutory duties are commonly, but not exclusively, undertaken by the Company Secretary:

- provides comprehensive legal and administrative support and guidance to the board of directors
- ensures that the board’s decisions and instructions are properly carried out and communicated
- has responsibility to ensure that the company complies with all relevant statutory and regulatory requirements
- has responsibility for communication with the shareholders when required
- acts as principal administration officer, liaising with staff, customers, suppliers, media and the board of directors
- executes important documentation on behalf of the company, together with a director.

The status of "Chartered Secretary" is reserved for qualifying members of the Irish branch of the Chartered Governance Institute.

=== Malaysia ===
In Malaysia, the Companies Act 2016 requires that every company to appoint at least one secretary. The secretary has to be appointed within the first 30 days after incorporation or a penalty is imposed on the Directors, running into a risk of being blacklisted. The responsibilities of the secretary include the following:

- Preparing board meetings and the Annual General Meeting (AGM) - As of year 2016 under the revised Companies Act, AGM is no longer necessary for Private Limited Companies (Sendirian Berhad or Sdn Bhd)
- Filing Annual returns to SSM (CCM in English)
- Amendments to the company Constitution
- Maintaining statutory documents
- Filing updates with SSM on matters such as changes of company name or address, issue of shares, changes in directors, shareholders, etc.

Only an individual who satisfies the requirement in the Companies Act 2016, section 235 (2) may be appointed a company secretary. The only professional body in Malaysia that awards the Chartered Secretary (FCIS/ACIS) qualification is the Malaysian Institute of Chartered Secretaries and Administrators (MAICSA), which is a division of the Chartered Governance Institute, United Kingdom. In addition to the qualifications specified in the Companies Act 2016, section 235 (2), a company secretary must also hold a current practising certificate issued by the Companies Commission of Malaysia (Suruhanjaya Syarikat Malaysia).

=== Singapore ===
Every company in Singapore must appoint a company secretary within six months of incorporation, as required by ACRA. If the company has only one director, he or she cannot be the Corporate Secretary. The responsibilities of the Corporate Secretary include the following:

- Filing Annual Returns: Prepares and files accurate company information with ACRA.
- Maintaining Statutory Registers: Updates records like directors, shareholders, and charges.
- Monitoring Deadlines: Ensures AGMs, filings, and other requirements are met on time.
- Liaising with ACRA: Manages correspondence for changes in company details or appointments.

For public companies, the Secretary must be a registered filing agent or a qualified individual.

=== South Africa ===
In South Africa, all public and state-owned company must appoint a company secretary. The roles and responsibilities of the company secretary are defined in the Companies Act, No 71 of 2008. For publicly listed companies, these roles were clarified and expanded by the King IV report. In addition, non-profit companies that have voluntarily adopted the "Enhanced Accountability and Transparency" provisions of the Companies Act must appoint a company secretary whose role is comparable to that of a public company.

=== Sri Lanka ===
In Sri Lanka, the Companies Act, No. 07 of 2007 requires that each registered company has a company secretary. A company secretary is required to be registered with the Department of Registrar of Companies, to function as a company secretary. Eligibility to function as a secretary are;

- Sri Lankan citizen
- An Attorney at law, a Chartered Accountant or any person demanded have followed a program of study by the Subject Minister
- Applicants with over 20 years experience in the company secretaries field may be appointed after an interview with the Registrar of Companies.

=== United Kingdom ===
The legal requirement for a private company in the UK to have a company secretary was removed under the Companies Act 2006, with effect from 8 April 2008. There is now no legal obligation unless the company's articles of association state otherwise. If a private company does not have a company secretary then the company's secretarial duties and responsibilities fall upon the directors of the company. With the increase in the number of social enterprises and community interest companies there is often a demand for a company secretary in the voluntary and community sectors as well as ordinary private trading companies. A public company in the UK must still have a formally appointed company secretary.

Chartered Secretaries are the sixth highest paid employees in the UK according to the Office for National Statistics' Annual Survey of Hours and Earnings (March 2010).

The exact responsibilities of the company secretary depend on the size and nature of the company and there is no statutory definition of what these are, but it generally includes some or all of the following:

- maintaining the company's statutory registers;
- updating the records held by Companies House;
- maintaining the company's registered office;

- advising the board of directors on their legal and corporate responsibilities and matters of corporate governance;

- organizing the company's board meetings and annual general meeting;
- minuting board meetings;
- ensuring company compliance with legal obligations;
- managing and storing the company's records, e.g. re investments, property, payroll, insurance, accounting, taxation (VAT, PAYE, Corporation Tax); and
- liaison between the company and its stakeholders and shareholders

In the UK, the company secretary may be qualified by virtue of examination and membership of The Chartered Governance Institute (CGI), which is the main qualification specifically for company secretaries. CGI is the body dedicated to the advancement and recognition of professional administration based on a combination of degree-level studies, carefully vetted experience and sponsorship by two people of professional status. Only a person thus qualified is entitled to be designated a 'Chartered Secretary' or 'Chartered Company Secretary'. The Faculty of Secretaries and Administrators founded in 1930 is the second body of corporate secretaries in the United Kingdom and now has a strong emphasis on equality work and governance and its members are designated 'corporate secretaries' or 'certified public secretaries'. It is expected that company secretaries of publicly quoted companies will be professionally qualified through CGI, one of the chartered professional bodies in the accountancy profession, or have appropriate training and experience through another body.

=== United States of America ===
The role of the corporate secretary is governed by state corporation law in the United States and is commonly, but not exclusively, responsible for the following:

- Board and Committee Meetings
- Minutes of Meetings
- Annual Meeting of Shareholders including the Proxy Statement
- Corporate Records
- Subsidiary Management
- Stock Transfers and Dividends
- Securities Market Listings and Compliance with Listing Standards
- Compliance with Federal and State Governance Laws
- Governance Liaison for Officers and Directors
- Shareholder Engagement on Governance Issues

The role of the corporate secretary has become increasingly crucial among publicly traded companies in North America, with a growing emphasis on providing guidance on corporate governance matters. Sound corporate governance is deemed essential for both board and company performance, especially in the eyes of shareholders, particularly institutional investors. In certain corporations, the corporate secretary's function as a corporate governance adviser has been formalized, often reflected in a revised title such as Chief Governance Officer added to their existing designation.

In view of the important roles the company secretary plays in business, PLCs and large companies require the company secretary to be suitably trained, experienced and professionally qualified for these responsibilities.

Many corporate secretaries of North American public companies are lawyers and some serve as their corporation's general counsel. While this can be helpful in the execution of their duties it can also create ambiguity as to what is legal advice, protected by privilege, and what is business advice.
