= Lillian Bagala =

Ugandan woman activist

- Citizenship: Ugandan
- Education: Post Graduate Diploma in Project Planning and Management from Uganda Management Institute, Bachelor or Arts Degree in Social Sciences from Makerere University
- Employer(s): Irise International, USAID, British Council,

Lillian Bagala is a regional director of Irise International, East Africa and a director for the Uganda Youth Network. She has been part of the Technical Working Committee for USAID – CORE Initiative to review and evaluate proposals, and was a pioneer member of the AFRiYAN - Africa Youth Adolescent Network for sub-Saharan Africa constituted by UNFPA to respond to sexual and reproductive health issues among young people. She established the Period Equality Network which brings together 85 member organizations across East Africa that champion menstrual health and hygiene work to engage in collective advocacy.

== Education ==
Lillian Bagala attended Makerere University, from which she earned a Bachelor of Arts in social sciences, specializing in social work, political science, and psychology. She then earned a post-graduate diploma in project planning and management from Uganda Management Institute.

== Career ==
Bagala was part of the team from Ministry of Gender, Labor and Social Development Uganda that conducted a research on the Situation Analysis of Child Poverty and Deprivation in Uganda together with UNICEF, Uganda, Economic Policy Research Centre, Uganda.

== Achievements ==
Bagala was successfully nominated to join the Core Group of the Global Menstrual Health Collective

== See also ==
- Violet Kajubiri
- Noerine Kaleeba
- Gladys Kalema-Zikusoka
- Cleopatra Kambugu Kentaro
- Katie Kibuka
- Jane Frances Kuka
- Gertrude Kulany
- Primah Kwagala
- Leilah Babirye
- Edith Mary Bataringaya
