= Solome Nakaweesi Kimbugwe =

Ugandan feminist activist and development consultant

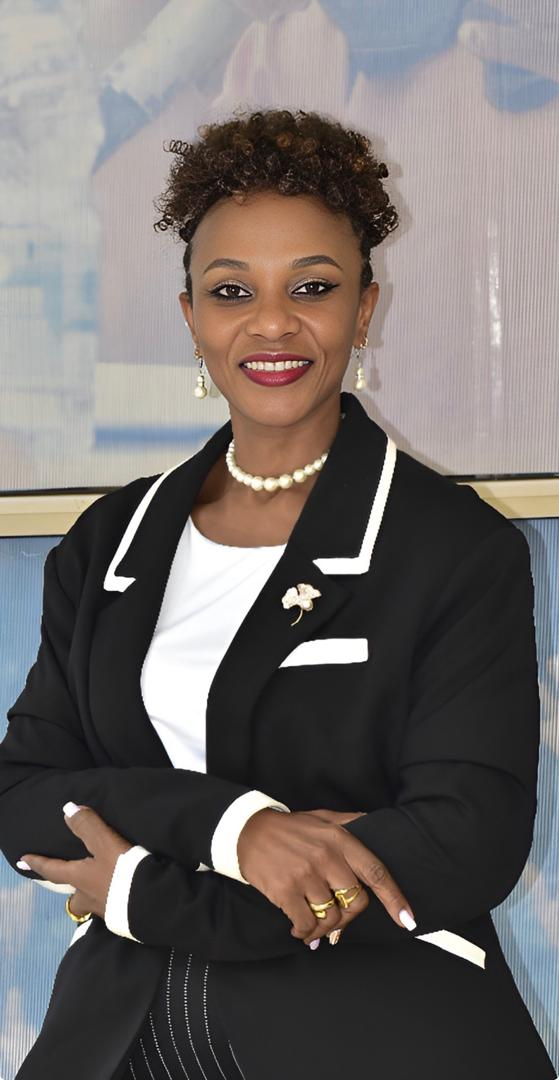
- Nakaweesi in 2026
- Born: Uganda
- Education: Makerere University; University of East Anglia
- Occupations: Feminist activist, development consultant
- Known for: Women's rights advocacy, movement building

Solome Nakaweesi Kimbugwe is a Ugandan feminist activist, international development consultant, and thought leader with over three decades of experience advancing women’s rights, gender equality, and social justice across Africa. She has held leadership positions in major women’s rights organisations and has contributed to policy development, movement building, and feminist scholarship.

== Early life and education ==
Solome Nakaweesi Kimbugwe was born to Sarah Naiga‑Muwayira and the late Gaster Muwayire‑Nakana Kimbugwe. She attended Uganda Martyrs Namugongo for primary education, Gombe Secondary School, and later completed her secondary studies at Trinity College Nabbingo.

She earned a Bachelor of Social Science from Makerere University in 1997 and a Master of Arts in Development Studies from the University of East Anglia, Norwich, United Kingdom, in 2000.

== Career ==
=== Early career and UWONET ===
Nakaweesi began her activism in the 1990s. She was Coordinator of the Uganda Women’s Network (UWONET), a leading women’s advocacy and lobbying coalition in Uganda. In that role, she was praised for raising the network’s profile through media relations and for managing a sometimes fractious membership with skill.

She came into wider public prominence in 2006 when she, together with a group of women activists, introduced and strongly defended the first‑ever production in Uganda of The Vagina Monologues – a play addressing sexual violence against women. The production was banned by the Media Council, but the campaign generated wide debate on women’s sexual rights and gender‑based violence. Reflecting on the episode, Nakaweesi later wrote that the campaign “unleashed a wave of protests” and posed a serious threat to the women’s movement, yet it forced a necessary public conversation about women’s sexuality and control.

=== Akina Mama wa Afrika ===
In early 2007, Nakaweesi was appointed Executive Director of Akina Mama wa Afrika, a pan‑African feminist organisation headquartered in London (later moving to Kampala). She was the first Ugandan woman to hold the position, which she described as highly competitive.

During her tenure, she led initiatives in feminist leadership development, policy advocacy, and movement building across the continent. She also supported the work of Akina Mama’s sub‑regional office in Kampala, continuing to influence Ugandan women’s rights work.

=== Nabagereka Development Foundation ===
Nakaweesi later was Chief Executive Officer of the Nabagereka Development Foundation, established under the patronage of the Nnabagereka of Buganda, Sylvia Nagginda. In this role, she oversaw programmes addressing teenage pregnancy, girls’ education, and family empowerment. Her work was featured in Ugandan media, including efforts to connect girls with role models and instil values in young people.

=== Consulting, teaching and thought leadership ===
Since leaving executive leadership roles, Nakaweesi has worked as an independent international development consultant, specialising in progressive social movement building, policy development, and human rights advocacy. She was country representative for the Robert Bosch Stiftung, working on projects to empower women in public sector decision‑making.

She has also lectured at Makerere University and Nkumba University and worked as a research supervisor at Noragric University (now part of the Norwegian University of Life Sciences).

In a 2020 interview with New Vision, Nakaweesi emphasised the importance of investing in women’s leadership, stating: “We must invest in leadership as women. We are tired of women working for more than 30 years and retiring into poverty. When women rise, the whole of society rises.”

== Advocacy and positions ==
=== LBQ women’s rights ===
Nakaweesi has been a vocal advocate for the inclusion of lesbian, bisexual, and queer (LBQ) women in the struggle against gender‑based violence. In a 2018 opinion piece for Kuchu Times she argued that “female sexual minorities face harsher mistreatment because of our vulnerability” and called for working “as a wider movement and across movements” to ensure inclusion of all women.

In 2009 she co‑authored an article with Frank Mugisha warning that the proposed Anti‑Homosexuality Bill would create a “fascist‑style society” where citizens would be forced to spy on one another.

=== Women in public service ===
Through her work with the Equal Opportunities Commission and the Women in Public Sector (WiPS) project, Nakaweesi has advocated for increased representation of women in senior government positions. She highlighted the disparity in women’s participation in public service and called for capacity building to enable women to champion their rights and protect their spaces.

=== Feminist movement building ===
Nakaweesi has contributed to feminist discourse through her writing. She has written for openDemocracy and Pambazuka News on topics related to gender justice and development.

== Publications and editorial work ==
Nakaweesi’s writing has appeared in multiple academic books and anthologies. Her work is cited in:

Gender and Development in Africa

Women and Power in Africa

The Palgrave Handbook of African Women’s Studies

Regional Consultative Meeting on Women’s Leadership Report (co-editor)

== Media appearances ==
Nakaweesi has appeared on Ugandan national television and international platforms. She participated in the AfricaLink podcast on DW, discussing contemporary issues affecting women and families.

Her commentary on gender equality and economic empowerment has been covered by New Vision, The Monitor, and Uganda Radio Network.

== Personal life ==
Nakaweesi is a mother of two. In a 2007 interview, she recounted that marrying the father of her children while still a university student, and later choosing to study in the UK despite her husband’s initial opposition, were pivotal decisions that shaped her career. She has said her achievements opened her husband’s eyes to see her as a partner rather than “that little girl he married”.

She has spoken publicly about her late father, Gaster Muwayire‑Nakana Kimbugwe, and the influence of family on her work. In her keynote address at a 2009 regional workshop on human rights defenders, she emphasised the importance of self‑care, nurturing support networks, and using “the power of dress, style and coordination” as creative tools for activism. Outside her professional life, she is passionate about fashion and supports African designers and artisans, viewing economic empowerment as connected to celebrating cultural expression through art and design.

== See also ==
- Winnie Byanyima
- Patricia Munabi Babiiha
- Rita Aciro
- Tezira Jamwa
- Esther Opoti Dhugira
