= Jane Frances Kuka =

Ugandan politician and activist (1952 or 1953 – 2025)

Jane Frances Kuka Honourable

Woman Member of Parliament, Kapchorwa
- Succeeded by: Gertrude Kulany

Woman Member of Parliament, Kapchorwa

Minister of State for Gender and Community Development
- Preceded by: Baguma Isoke

Resident District Commissioner, Kapchorwa (2007)
- Preceded by: Tezira Jamwa
- Succeeded by: Joseph Arwata

Personal details
- Born: Jane Frances Yasiwa; 1952 or 1953
- Died: 22 September 2025 (aged 72)
- Party: National Resistance Movement
- Spouse: Stephen Kuka
- Education: Gamatui Primary School; Nyondo Teachers College, Mbale; Ggaba Teachers College
- Occupation: Politician anti-fgm activist

Jane Frances Kuka (1952 or 1953 – 22 September 2025) was a Ugandan educator, anti-Female Genital Mutilation (FGM) activist and politician who was a Member of Parliament for Kapchorwa in Uganda's sixth parliament (1996–2001), and was replaced by Gertrude Kulany. She was the Minister of State for Gender and Development from 1996 to 1998, a State Minister for Disaster Preparedness in 1999 and later appointed Resident District Commissioner for Kapchorwa District in 2007 replacing Tezira Jamwa.

== Background and education ==
Kuka was born Jane Frances Yasiwa in Sipi, Kapchorwa to Miriam Chelangat in the 1950s. She attended Gamutui Primary School then later in 1966 enrolled at Nyondo Teachers College in Mbale. She qualified as a teacher in 1969. She followed this up at Ggaba Teachers College and became a grade three teacher.

== Career ==
=== Teaching ===
Kuka was a music teacher at Gamutui Primary School in 1969. In 1988, she was promoted to Principal of Kapchorwa Teachers’ College.

=== Politics ===
Kuka unsuccessfully tried to run for Parliament in the 1989 elections as well as the Constituent Assembly elections in 1994. She was later elected as Woman Member of Parliament and represented Kapchorwa in Uganda's sixth parliament.

In addition to being a Member of Parliament, she served as the State Minister for Gender and Community Development (1996 -1998). In 1999, she was transferred and appointed the State Minister for Disaster Preparedness and Refugees.

In 2007, she was appointed Resident District Commissioner for Kapchorwa district and reappointed to the same position in 2014. In between she worked as the President's deputy principal private secretary.

=== Anti-FGM activism ===
As the principal of Kapchorwa Teachers College in 1988, Kuka survived lynching as she was opposed to the resolution of the Kapchorwa District Council that made Female genital mutilation (FGM) mandatory. Kuka herself refers to it as "Female Genital Cutting" as she says that the term "Female Genital Mutilation sounds too harsh and fosters too much defensiveness".

She has been dubbed "Heroine of the Female Genital Mutilation fight" and has spoken on the topic on a number of international platforms.

== Personal life and death ==
In 1972, she married Steven Kuka. She died after a short illness on 22 September 2025, at the age of 72.

== Awards and recognition ==
In 2012, Kuka received a civilian award – The Distinguished Order of the Nile – Class 4 in recognition of her activism against Female Genital Mutilation.

In recognition of her fight against Female Genital Mutilation (FGM), Kuka was awarded the Tumaini Lifetime Achievement award in 2013.

== See also ==
- Gertrude Kulany
- Female Genital Mutilation (FGM)
