= Esther Opoti Dhugira =

Ugandan legislator and teacher (1962–2001)

Esther Opoti Dhugira Honourable

Member of Parliament, Nebbi
- Preceded by: Anthony Ofwori Rugete
- Succeeded by: Esther Pacuto Odongo

Constituent Assembly Delegate, Nebbi

Woman Representative, Nebbi District

Personal details
- Born: Esther Opoti Dhugira; 9 September 1962
- Died: 18 August 2001 (aged 39)
- Party: National Resistance Movement(NRM)
- Children: 2
- Education: Arua Public School; Kitgum Public School; Kitgum High School; Dr.Obote College, Boroboro; Onyama National Teachers College
- Alma mater: Makerere University
- Occupation: Politician; Teacher

Esther Opoti Dhugira (9 September 1962 – 18 August 2001) was a Ugandan legislator and woman Member of Parliament for Nebbi District in Uganda's 7th Parliament. In Uganda's Constituent Assembly between 1994 and 1995, she represented Okoro County in Nebbi. Dhugira alongside Winnie Byanyima and others was one of the founders of Forum for Women in Democracy (FOWODE).

== Background and education ==
According to her eulogy given by Loyce Bwambale at a parliamentary sitting in 2001, Dhugira was born to Onenoth Opoti Jalmoi, a District Education Officer and Vitali Opoti in Kituli town.

She attended a number of primary schools such as Arua Public School in 1969 and completed her primary education at Kitgum Public School. She proceeded to Kitgum High School, Dr. Obote College, and Boroboro in Lira, where she finished her O-level studies in 1983.

Dhugira obtained a Diploma in Education at Onyama National Teachers College in Gulu as well as Nkozi Teachers Training College in 1987.

She later attended Makerere University where she graduated with a Bachelor of Social Sciences Degree, specialising in Political Science with a bias in Public Administration and Psychology.

== Career ==
In 1998, Dhugira was a teacher at Erusi Senior Secondary School in Nebbi and thereafter she joined the National Resistance Council (NRC) in 1989.

She was elected to the Board of Directors, Kinyara Sugar Works Limited in 1991 and was also a Director at Immigration Control Board, from 1994.She was also a Member of the Appointments Board at the Institute of Education, ITEK – Kyambogo.

During Uganda's 1994 Ugandan Constituent Assembly election, Dhugira was elected as the delegate to represent Okoro County in Nebbi.

She unsuccessfully contested parliamentary election against the late Anthony Ofwori Rugete in 1996 . She contested again in the 2001 general elections and was the Woman Representative for Nebbi in Uganda's 7th Parliament till her death the same year. She was replaced by Betty Odongo Pacuto.

In 1995, alongside Winnie Byanyima, Solome Mukisa, Betty Akech, Loyce Bwambale, Tezira Jamwa, Margaret Zziwa, Benigna Mukiibi and Margaret Ssebagereka, Dhugira co-founded FOWODE.

== Personal life ==
On 18 August 2001, Dhugira died at Mulago Hospital, where she had been admitted for three weeks with chronic ulcers. She was survived by two daughters.

== See also ==
- Parliament of Uganda
- Nebbi district
