= 2009–10 Blackburn Rovers F.C. season =

Blackburn Rovers
2009–10 season
- Chairman: John Williams
- Manager: Sam Allardyce
- Premier League: 10th
- FA Cup: Third round
- League Cup: Semi-finals
- Top goalscorer: League: David Dunn (9); All: David Dunn (10)
- Highest home attendance: 29,912 (vs. Manchester United, 11 April 2010)
- Lowest home attendance: 8,419 (vs. Peterborough United, 27 October 2009)
- Average home league attendance: 25,426 (league), 15,050 (Cup), 23,686 (all comps)
Home colours	Away colours	Third colours

The 2009–10 season was Blackburn Rovers' 122nd season as a professional football club. The 2009–10 season was Blackburn Rovers' 16th season in the Premier League, and their 9th consecutive season in the top division of English football.

== Pre-season ==
=== Ins and outs ===
The end of the previous season saw the departure of first-team squad players. André Ooijer, Aaron Mokoena and Tugay Kerimoğlu all left the club on free transfers. With that in mind, Sam Allardyce wasted no time in bringing new additions into the club, with the signing of the South African international winger Elrio Van Heerden from Club Brugge on 2 June on a free transfer.

A few weeks later, Roque Santa Cruz signed for Manchester City, ending 12 months of speculation. Two days later, Matt Derbyshire completed a move to Olympiacos, where he had been on loan since January 2009. With the incoming cash, Blackburn quickly move to secure Gaël Givet to a permanent contract following his successful loan spell from Marseille in the second half of the prior season.

He was swiftly followed into Ewood Park by another free transfer, right-back Lars Jacobsen, who had been released from Everton following two years plagued by injury, and Steven Nzonzi, a central midfielder who joined from French club Amiens for an undisclosed fee.

With the departure of two strikers and the lack of depth shown up front the prior season by being forced to play Christopher Samba as a striker for the most part, the attention was then shifted to strengthening the frontline. After being linked to numerous big-name strikers such as Bojan, Ruud van Nistelrooy and Christian Vieri throughout the summer, Blackburn finally secured the signings of Franco Di Santo on loan and the permanent signing of Croatian striker Nikola Kalinić in early August. Due to the arrival of two new strikers, Paul Gallagher was allowed to leave the club, joining Championship side Leicester City in order to play regular first-team football.

In mid-August, Míchel Salgado became available on a free transfer after being released by Real Madrid. Given Allardyce's previous experience of prolonging older players careers, Salgado opted to join Blackburn. This would seemingly signal the end of any summer transfer activity as the board had requested that the wage bill be reduced and that a large amount of the transfer fees received from the sales of Santa Cruz and Derbyshire go towards paying off existing debt and supporting the upcoming season's wage bill.

However, after the season had begun, Aston Villa began to pursue Blackburn's previous player of the season, Stephen Warnock. Unable to resist the money on offer, Blackburn accepted the bid and allowed the player to leave. A reason behind allowing the move was that a ready replacement was already lined up, in the form of Pascal Chimbonda, who joined on the same day as Warnock departed.

Barring loan deals to lower league teams, this would mark the end of Blackburn's summer transfer activities.

=== Friendlies ===
14 July 2009	Cambridge	0–4	Blackburn Rovers	Cambridge
		Report	Andrews 27'; Diouf 37'; Roberts 57', 79'	Stadium: Abbey Stadium; Attendance: 1,813

16 July 2009	Roma	2–2	Blackburn Rovers	Bolzano
	Taddei 24'; Riise 36'	Report	Gallagher 44'; Doran 52'	Stadium: Druso Stadium; Attendance: 9,074

18 July 2009	Nacional	0–0	Blackburn Rovers	Split
		Report		Stadium: Gradski stadion u Poljudu

18 July 2009	Hajduk Split	1–0	Blackburn ROvers	Split
	Ibričić 12'	Report		Stadium: Gradski stadion u Poljudu

25 July 2009	Leeds United	1–1	Blackburn Rovers	Leeds
	Beckford 50'	Report	Gallagher 89' (pen.)	Stadium: Elland Road; Attendance: 11,885

1 August 2009	Sheffield Wednesday	2–2	Blackburn Rovers	Sheffield
	Sodje 23'; Tudgay 50'	Report	Nelsen 6'; Roberts 21'	Stadium: Hillsborough; Attendance: 5,579

5 August 2009	Blackburn Rovers	0–0	Hibernian	Blackburn
		Report		Stadium: Ewood Park; Attendance: 5,563

8 August 2009	Dundee United	2–0	Blackburn Rovers	Blackburn
	Shala 27'; Khizanishvili 71' (o.g.)	Report		Stadium: Ewood Park; Attendance: 3,717

- The matches against Nacional and Hajduk Split were both 45 minutes in length as part of a mini tournament.
- The match against Roma ended with a penalty shoot-out which Blackburn lost 3–2.

== Premier League ==
=== August ===
15 August 2009	Blackburn	0–2	Manchester City	Blackburn
15:00	Warnock (yellow card) 84'; Gallagher (yellow card) 90'	Report	Adebayor 3'; Ireland 90+1'; Richards (yellow card) 79'	Stadium: Ewood Park; Attendance: 29,584; Referee: Mike Dean

22 August 2009	Sunderland	2–1	Blackburn	Sunderland
15:00	Jones 32', 53'; Cattermole (yellow card) 45+1'; Bardsley (yellow card) 81'	Report	Givet 21'; McCarthy (yellow card) 90+1'	Stadium: Stadium of light Attendance: 37,106; Referee: Alan Wiley

29 August 2009	Blackburn	0–0	West Ham United	Blackburn
15:00	Dunn (yellow card) 75'	Report	Collins (yellow card) 9'; Noble (yellow card) 54'; Parker (yellow card) 79'	Stadium: Ewood Park; Attendance: 23,421; Referee: Phil Dowd

At the end of August, Blackburn were sitting 18th in the table, taking only 1 point from a possible 9.

Pos	Club	Pld	W	D	L	GF	GA	GD	Pts
18	Blackburn Rovers	3	0	1	2	1	4	-3	1

Pld = Matches played; W = Matches won; D = Matches drawn; L = Matches lost; F = Goals for; A = Goals against; GD = Goal difference; Pts = Points

=== September ===
12 September 2009	Blackburn	3–1	Wolves	Blackburn
15:00	Diouf 19'; Roberts 56'; Dunn 64'; Andrews (yellow card) 81'	Report	Maierhofer 88'; Stearman (yellow card) 66'; Berra (yellow card) 86'	Stadium: Ewood Park; Attendance: 24,845 (7,448 away); Referee: Steve Bennett

20 September 2009	Everton	3–0	Blackburn	Liverpool
15:00	Saha 22', 54'; Yobo 58'; Heitinga (yellow card) 18'	Report	Dunn (yellow card) 37'; Diouf (yellow card) 65'	Stadium: Goodison Park; Attendance: 35,546; Referee: Lee Mason

26 September 2009	Blackburn	2–1	Aston Villa	Blackburn
15:00	Samba 24'; Dunn 89' (pen.), (yellow card) 60'; Grella (yellow card) 34' (yellow-red card) 68'	Report	Agbonlahor 3'; Delph (yellow card) 55'; Petrov (yellow card) 66'	Stadium: Ewood Park; Attendance: 25,172; Referee: Mark Clattenburg

From the September fixtures Blackburn had taken 6 points from a possible 9 and moved up to 13th in the table.

Pos	Club	Pld	W	D	L	GF	GA	GD	Pts
13	Blackburn Rovers	6	2	1	3	6	9	-3	7

Pld = Matches played; W = Matches won; D = Matches drawn; L = Matches lost; F = Goals for; A = Goals against; GD = Goal difference; Pts = Points

=== October ===
5 October 2009	Arsenal	6–2	Blackburn	London
13:30	Vermaelen 17'; Van Persie 33' (yellow card) 45+3'; Arshavin 37'; Fàbregas 57'; Walcott 75'; Bendtner 89'	Report	Nzonzi 4'; Dunn 30'; Di Santo (yellow card) 11'	Stadium: Emirates Stadium; Attendance: 59,431; Referee: Peter Walton

18 October 2009	Blackburn Rovers	3–2	Burnley	Blackburn
13:00	Dunn 9'; Di Santo 21', (yellow card) 22'; Chimbonda 43'; Nzonzi (yellow card) 51'; Samba (yellow card) 87'	Report	Blake 5'; Eagles 90+2'; Carlisle (yellow card) 83'; Mears (yellow card) 86'; Jensen (yellow card) 90+3'	Stadium: Ewood Park; Attendance: 26,689; Referee: Chris Foy

24 October 2009	Chelsea	5–0	Blackburn	London
17:30	Givet 20' (o.g.); Lampard 48', 59' (pen.); Essien 52'; Drogba 64'	Report	Pedersen (yellow card) 45+1'	Stadium: Stamford Bridge; Attendance: 40,836; Referee: Alan Wiley

31 October 2009	Manchester United	2–0	Blackburn	Manchester
17:30	Berbatov 55'; Rooney 87'	Report	Emerton (yellow card) 35'; Chimbonda (yellow card) 37'	Stadium: Old Trafford; Attendance: 74,658; Referee: Phil Dowd

From the October fixtures Blackburn had taken 3 points from a possible 12 and moved down to 17th in the table.

Pos	Club	Pld	W	D	L	GF	GA	GD	Pts
17	Blackburn Rovers	10	3	1	6	11	24	-13	10

Pld = Matches played; W = Matches won; D = Matches drawn; L = Matches lost; F = Goals for; A = Goals against; GD = Goal difference; Pts = Points

=== November ===
7 November 2009	Blackburn	3–1	Portsmouth	Blackburn
15:00	Roberts 53', 86'; Nelsen 73', (yellow card) 40'; Chimbonda (yellow card) 35'; Givet (yellow card) 36'	Report	O'Hara 15', (yellow card) 35'; Boateng (yellow card) 56'; Brown (yellow card) 65'	Stadium: Ewood Park; Attendance: 23,110; Referee: Peter Walton

22 November 2009	Bolton Wanderers	0–2	Blackburn	Bolton
13:30	Taylor (yellow card) 41'; Muamba (yellow card) 44'; Klasnić (yellow card) 79'	Report	Dunn 31', (yellow card) 44'; Ricketts 72' (o.g.)	Stadium: Reebok Stadium; Attendance: 21,777; Referee: Mike Dean

25 November 2009	Fulham	3–0	Blackburn	London
20:00	Nevland 43'; Dempsey 67', 88'	Report		Stadium: Craven Cottage; Attendance: 21,414; Referee: Stuart Attwell

28 November 2009	Blackburn	0–0	Stoke City	Blackburn
15:00	Di Santo (yellow card) 60'	Report	Whitehead (yellow card) 37'; Wilkinson (yellow card) 89'	Stadium: Ewood Park; Attendance: 25,143; Referee: Howard Webb

At the end of November Blackburn were sitting 13th in the table taking 7 points from a possible 12.

Pos	Club	Pld	W	D	L	GF	GA	GD	Pts
13	Blackburn Rovers	14	5	2	7	16	28	-12	17

Pld = Matches played; W = Matches won; D = Matches drawn; L = Matches lost; F = Goals for; A = Goals against; GD = Goal difference; Pts = Points

=== December ===
5 December 2009	Blackburn	0–0	Liverpool	Blackburn
15:00	Diouf (yellow card) 55'	Report		Stadium: Ewood Park; Attendance: 29,660; Referee: Martin Atkinson

12 December 2009	Hull City	0–0	Blackburn	Hull
15:00	Marney (yellow card) 9'	Report	Kalinić (yellow card) 63'; Samba (yellow card) 71'	Stadium: KC Stadium; Attendance: 24,124; Referee: Chris Foy

15 December 2009	Birmingham City	2–1	Blackburn	Birmingham
20:00	Jerome 12', 48', (yellow card) 48'; Ferguson (yellow card) 90+3'	Report	Nelsen 69', (yellow card) 57'; Nzonzi (yellow card) 45+1'	Stadium: St Andrew's; Attendance: 23,187; Referee: Michael Jones

19 December 2009	Blackburn	0–2	Tottenham Hotspur	Blackburn
15:00		Report	Crouch 45+2', 82'; Ćorluka (yellow card) 34'	Stadium: Ewood Park; Attendance: 29,490; Referee: Peter Walton

26 December 2009	Wigan Athletic	1–1	Blackburn	Wigan
15:00	Rodallega 53'; Thomas (yellow card) 90+3'	Report	McCarthy 29'; Salgado (yellow card) 14'; Givet (yellow card) 37'; Chimbonda (yellow card) 43'; Nzonzi (yellow card) 84'	Stadium: DW Stadium; Attendance: 20,243; Referee: Mark Clattenburg

28 December 2009	Blackburn	2–2	Sunderland	Blackburn
15:00	Pedersen 53'; Diouf 77'; McCarthy (yellow card) 62'	Report	Bent 52', 65'; Nosworthy (yellow card) 30'; Meyler (yellow card) 36'; Bardsley (yellow card) 88'; Da Silva (yellow card) 90+4'	Stadium: Ewood Park; Attendance: 25,656; Referee: Mike Dean

At the end of December Blackburn remained 13th in the table taking 4 points from a possible 18.

Pos	Club	Pld	W	D	L	GF	GA	GD	Pts
13	Blackburn Rovers	20	5	6	9	20	35	-15	21

Pld = Matches played; W = Matches won; D = Matches drawn; L = Matches lost; F = Goals for; A = Goals against; GD = Goal difference; Pts = Points

=== January ===
11 January 2010	Manchester City	4–1	Blackburn	Manchester
20:00	Tevez 7', 49', 90+1'; Richards 39'; Zabaleta (yellow card) 61'	Report	Pedersen 71' (yellow card) 78'	Stadium: City of Manchester Stadium; Attendance: 40,292; Referee: Chris Foy

17 January 2010	Blackburn	2–0	Fulham	Blackburn
15:00	Samba 25', (yellow card) 28'; Nelsen 54'	Report	Baird (yellow card) 82'; Nevland (yellow card) 85'; Gera (yellow card) 90'	Stadium: Ewood Park; Attendance: 21,287; Referee: Kevin Friend

27 January 2010	Blackburn	2–1	Wigan	Blackburn
20:00	Pedersen 20'; Kalinić 76'; Reid (yellow card) 59'; Nzonzi (yellow card) 83'; Robinson (yellow card) 90+1'	Report	Caldwell 58'; Diamé (yellow card) 71'	Stadium: Ewood Park; Attendance: 22,190; Referee: Lee Mason

30 January 2010	West Ham United	0–0	Blackburn	London
15:00		Report	Emerton (yellow card) 38'	Stadium: Boleyn Ground; Attendance: 33,093; Referee: Peter Walton

At the end of January Blackburn were sitting 10th in the table taking 7 points from a possible 12.

Pos	Club	Pld	W	D	L	GF	GA	GD	Pts
10	Blackburn Rovers	24	7	7	10	25	40	-15	28

Pld = Matches played; W = Matches won; D = Matches drawn; L = Matches lost; F = Goals for; A = Goals against; GD = Goal difference; Pts = Points

=== February ===
6 February 2010	Stoke City	3–0	Blackburn	Stoke on Trent
15:00	Higginbotham 8'; Sidibe 45+2'; Etherington 67'; Shawcross (yellow card) 37'; Fuller (yellow card) 73'	Report	Samba (yellow card) 37' (yellow-red card) 59'; Nzonzi (yellow card) 52'; Andrews (yellow card) 90+3'	Stadium: Britannia Stadium; Attendance: 27,386; Referee: Steve Bennett

10 February 2010	Blackburn	1–0	Hull City	Blackburn
19:45	Myhill 16' (o.g.); Nelsen (yellow card) 75'	Report	McShane (yellow card) 51'; Altidore (yellow card) 61'; Gardner (yellow card) 77'; Boateng (red card) 40'	Stadium: Ewood Park; Attendance: 23,518; Referee: Lee Probert

21 February 2010	Blackburn	3–0	Bolton Wanderers	Blackburn
14:00	Kalinić 41'; Roberts 73'; Givet 84'	Report	Steinsson (yellow card) 75'	Stadium: Ewood Park; Attendance: 23,888; Referee: Chris Foy

28 February 2010	Liverpool	2–1	Blackburn	Liverpool
13:00	Gerrard 20'; Torres 44'; Lucas (yellow card) 90+2'	Report	Andrews 40'; Salgado (yellow card) 17'; Olsson (yellow card) 48'; Nzonzi (yellow card) 50'; Kalinić (yellow card) 50'; Diouf (yellow card) 70'	Stadium: Anfield; Attendance: 42,795; Referee: Alan Wiley

At the end of February Blackburn were sitting 10th in the table taking 6 points from a possible 12.

Pos	Club	Pld	W	D	L	GF	GA	GD	Pts
10	Blackburn Rovers	28	9	7	12	30	45	-15	34

Pld = Matches played; W = Matches won; D = Matches drawn; L = Matches lost; F = Goals for; A = Goals against; GD = Goal difference; Pts = Points

=== March ===
13 March 2010	Tottenham Hotspur	3–1	Blackburn	London
12:45	Defoe 45+1'; Pavlyuchenko 55', 85'	Report	Samba 80'	Stadium: White Hart Lane; Attendance: 35,474; Referee: Howard Webb

21 March 2010	Blackburn	1–1	Chelsea	Blackburn
16.00	Diouf 70'	Report	Drogba 6'; Zhirkov (yellow card) 88'	Stadium: Ewood Park; Attendance: 25,554; Referee: Steve Bennett

24 March 2010	Blackburn	2–1	Birmingham City	Blackburn
20.00	Dunn 5', 67'; Dunn (yellow card) 68'; Andrews (yellow card) 89'	Report	McFadden 55'; Carr (yellow card) 86'	Stadium: Ewood Park; Attendance: 23,856; Referee: Mark Clattenburg

28 March 2010	Burnley	0–1	Blackburn Rovers	Turf Moor
12:00		Report	Dunn 20'	Attendance: 21,546; Referee: Mike Dean

At the end of March Blackburn were sitting 10th in the table taking 7 points from a possible 12.

Pos	Club	Pld	W	D	L	GF	GA	GD	Pts
10	Blackburn Rovers	32	11	8	13	35	50	-15	41

Pld = Matches played; W = Matches won; D = Matches drawn; L = Matches lost; F = Goals for; A = Goals against; GD = Goal difference; Pts = Points

=== April ===
3 April 2010	Portsmouth	0–0	Blackburn	Portsmouth
15:00	Vanden Borre (yellow card) 43', (red card) 60'; Brown (yellow card) 74'	Report	Dunn (yellow card) 50'	Stadium: Fratton Park; Attendance: 16,207; Referee: Steve Bennett

11 April 2010	Blackburn	0–0	Manchester United	Blackburn
13:30	Salgado (yellow card) 23'	Report	Neville (yellow card) 70'; Gibson (yellow card) 87'	Stadium: Ewood Park; Attendance: 29,912; Referee: Peter Walton

17 April 2010	Blackburn	2–3	Everton	Blackburn
15:00	Nzonzi 69'; Roberts 81'; Pedersen (yellow card) 20'; Andrews (yellow card) 65'; Roberts (yellow card) 82'	Report	Arteta 4' (pen.); Yakubu 79'; Cahill 90'; Arteta (yellow card) 20'; Distin (yellow card) 76'	Stadium: Ewood Park; Attendance: 27,022; Referee: Andre Marriner

24 April 2010	Wolverhampton	1–1	Blackburn	Wolverhampton
15:00	Ebanks-Blake 81'	Report	Nelsen 28'; Pedersen (yellow card) 54'	Stadium: Molineux Stadium; Attendance: 28,967; Referee: Mark Clattenburg

At the end of April Blackburn were sitting 11th in the table taking 3 points from a possible 12.

Pos	Club	Pld	W	D	L	GF	GA	GD	Pts
10	Blackburn Rovers	36	11	11	14	38	54	-16	44

Pld = Matches played; W = Matches won; D = Matches drawn; L = Matches lost; F = Goals for; A = Goals against; GD = Goal difference; Pts = Points

=== May ===
3 May 2010	Blackburn	2–1	Arsenal	Blackburn
17:00	Grella (yellow card) 25'; Dunn 43'; Pedersen (yellow card) 59'; Samba 68'	Report	Van Persie 13'; Silvestre (yellow card) 65'; Campbell (yellow card) 90'	Stadium: Ewood Park; Attendance: 26,138; Referee: Martin Atkinson

9 May 2010	Aston Villa	0–1	Blackburn	Birmingham
16:00	Dunne (yellow card) 7'; A. Young (yellow card) 78'	Report	Dunn (yellow card) 58'; Dunne 84' (o.g.)	Stadium: Villa Park; Attendance: 41,799; Referee: Steve Bennett

At the end of the season Blackburn finished 10th in the table taking a maximum 6 points out of 6 in May.

Pos	Club	Pld	W	D	L	GF	GA	GD	Pts
10	Blackburn Rovers	38	13	11	14	41	55	-14	50

Pld = Matches played; W = Matches won; D = Matches drawn; L = Matches lost; F = Goals for; A = Goals against; GD = Goal difference; Pts = Points

=== Results by round ===
Round	1	2	3	4	5	6	7	8	9	10	11	12	13	14	15	16	17	18	19	20	21	22	23	24	25	26	27	28	29	30	31	32	33	34	35	36	37	38
Ground	H	A	H	H	A	H	A	H	A	A	H	A	A	H	H	A	A	H	A	H	A	H	H	A	A	H	H	A	A	H	H	A	A	H	H	A	H	A
Result	L	L	D	W	L	W	L	W	L	L	W	W	L	D	D	D	L	L	D	D	L	W	W	D	L	W	W	L	L	D	W	W	D	D	L	D	W	W
Position	17	18	17	13	18	15	16	13	16	17	14 November 2012	13 December 2012	12	13	13	13	13 December 2011	10	12	11	12	12	12	12	11	10	11	11	12	11	10	10						

A = Away; H = Home; W = Win; D = Draw; L = Loss

=== Final league table ===
Pos	Team	Pld	W	D	L	GF	GA	GD	Pts
8	Everton	38	16	13	9	60	49	+11	61
9	Birmingham City	38	13	11	14	38	47	−9	50
10	Blackburn Rovers	38	13	11	14	41	55	−14	50
11	Stoke City	38	11	14	13	34	48	−14	47
12	Fulham	38	12	10	16	39	46	−7	46

Source: Barclays Premier League

== FA Cup ==
=== Third round ===
2 January 2010	Aston Villa	3-1	Blackburn	Birmingham
15.00	Delfouneso 12'; Cuéllar 37'; Carew 90+1' (pen.); Reo-Coker (yellow card) 31'	Report	Kalinić 55'; Salgado (yellow card) 37'; Diouf (red card) 42'	Stadium: Villa Park; Attendance: 25,453; Referee: Howard Webb

Both managers seemed to have placed the mid-week League Cup semi-final higher on the priority list as, between them, they made a total of 16 changes from the teams that started their previous matches.

Villa's line-up was the stronger of the two and the home side went ahead after 12 minutes. Cutting in from the left, Ashley Young centred the ball to Nathan Delfouneso, who opened the scoring with a straightforward header from 10 yards out. Young could have extended the lead himself before Villa conceded a penalty when Nigel Reo-Coker was adjudged to have brought down Steven Reid, but Brad Guzan saved from David Dunn. The miss was made worse when Young's free-kick was glanced in by Carlos Cuéllar to give Villa a 2–0 lead six minutes later. Things got even bleaker for Rovers when El-Hadji Diouf was given a straight red card before the break when he recklessly brought down Habib Beye.

Blackburn's attempts to get back into the match were given an unexpected lift when Guzan dropped an inswinging corner to allow Nikola Kalinić to score. Villa suddenly looked perturbed and Kalinić could have levelled matters after being sent clear by substitute Morten Gamst Pedersen, but Villa restored their authority when Reo-Coker had a shot turned round the post and, in the 90th minute, Gaël Givet brought down John Carew in the box with the Norwegian sending Rovers keeper Jason Brown the wrong way from the spot to send Blackburn crashing out at the first hurdle.

== League Cup ==
=== Second round ===
25 August 2009	Gillingham	1–3	Blackburn	Gillingham
19:45	Jackson 70' (pen.); Gowling (yellow card) 31'; Fuller (yellow card) 53'	Report	Dunn 5'; Hoilett 47'; Pedersen 74'; Kalinić (yellow card) 38'; Reid (yellow card) 45'; Olsson (yellow card) 61'; Brown (yellow card) 69'	Stadium: Priestfield Stadium, Attendance: 7,293; Referee: Kevin Friend

As one of the 13 Premier League teams not involved in European competition, Blackburn entered at the second round along with the winners from the first round plus Newcastle United and Middlesbrough, who also received a first round bye. The draw for the second round took place on 12 August, after the first round had been completed. Blackburn were drawn away to Gillingham; the match was played on 25 August.

Blackburn started the game brightly and, within 5 minutes, were 1–0 up when David Dunn slotted home Nikola Kalinić's through ball. Gillingham pressed for an equaliser and went closest when Mark McCammon headed just wide. Two minutes after the break, Rovers doubled their lead when Keith Andrews crossed the ball for David Hoilett to score his first goal for the club with a diving header. In the 70th minute Zurab Khizanishvili brought down Simeon Jackson in the box; Jackson himself got back up and scored from the spot to bring Gillingham back into the game. It proved not to be for Gillingham as Blackburn's progress into the next round was sealed 4 minutes later when Morten Gamst Pedersen scored direct from a corner on the right hand side.

=== Third round ===
22 September 2009	Nottingham Forest	0–1	Blackburn	Nottingham
19:45	Earnshaw (penalty missed)	Report	McCarthy 37'; Salgado (yellow card) 16'	Stadium: City Ground, Attendance: 11,553; Referee: Michael Oliver

The draw for the third round took place on 29 August, after the second round had been played. The seven Premier League teams involved in European competition entered at this stage, joined by the winners from the second round. Blackburn were drawn away to Nottingham Forest; the tie was played on 22 September.

Both teams created a few chances in an opening period where Forest looked more than a match for their Premiership rivals, although it was Blackburn who took the lead in the 37th minute when Benni McCarthy's cross-cum-shot-cum-free kick bypassed everyone in the box and nestled in the far corner. Forest were nearly level soon after when Robert Earnshaw's freekick struck the corner of the goal frame with Jason Brown beaten. Forest continued to press after the break and were awarded a penalty on 70 minutes when Steven Reid handled in the box. Dexter Blackstock stepped up to take the penalty but it was saved by Jason Brown. In the 90th minute Earnshaw had an even better chance to draw his team level but managed to blast over from a yard out.

=== Fourth round ===
27 October 2009	Blackburn	5–2	Peterborough	Blackburn
20:00	Pedersen 4'; Reid 45' (pen.); Salgado 57'; McCarthy 72'; Kalinić 74' (pen.); Givet (yellow card) 26'	Report	Whelpdale 17'; Boyd 50'; Lewis (red card) 43'	Stadium: Ewood Park; Attendance: 8,419; Referee: Anthony Taylor

The draw for the fourth round took place after the third-round games had been played, on 26 September; the matches were played in the week beginning 26 October. Blackburn were drawn at home to Championship side Peterborough.

Sam Allardyce opted to make seven changes from the team beaten at Chelsea and was swiftly rewarded when Morten Gamst Pedersen rifled home a free kick in the fourth minute. Peterborough fought back and after a dangerous free kick of their own equalised when Chris Whelpdale headed Chris Rowe's cross back across Jason Brown and into the back of the net. Just before half-time Peterborough were reduced to ten men when goalkeeper Joe Lewis was sent off when he brought down Pedersen after a defensive header had fallen short. Steven Reid stepped up to take the penalty and, despite slipping whilst taking the kick, still scored.

5 minutes after the restart Peterborough once again got themselves on level terms when George Boyd hit a fierce left-foot effort past Brown. The game was effectively ended as a contest in the 57th minute when Míchel Salgado collected Brett Emerton's pass and blasted in his first goal in English football. In the 72nd minute Benni McCarthy calmly slid the ball past substitute keeper James McKeown after being put through by Nikola Kalinić and, when Blackburn were awarded a penalty for handball two minutes later, Kalinić stepped up to the spot and converted for his first goal for the club. Blackburn were successfully through to the fifth round for the third successive season.

=== Fifth round ===
2 December 2009	Blackburn Rovers	3-3 (a.e.t.) (4 – 3 p)	Chelsea	Blackburn
20:00	Kalinić 9'; Emerton 64'; McCarthy 93' (pen.); Grella (yellow card) 106'	Report	Drogba 48'; Kalou 52'; Ferreira 120+1'; Bruma (yellow card) 101'	Stadium: Ewood Park; Attendance: 18,136; Referee: Alan Wiley
	Penalties
	McCarthy (penalty scored); Emerton (penalty scored); Grella (penalty scored); Kalinić (penalty missed); Hoilett (penalty scored)		(penalty missed) Ballack; (penalty scored) Drogba; (penalty scored) Malouda; (penalty scored) Zhirkov; (penalty missed) Kakuta

The fifth round draw took place on 31 October, with Blackburn being handed a home tie against Chelsea. The match was played on 2 December.

The tie started at a fast and frenetic pace, with both teams showing a willingness to attack from the opening whistle. Nikola Kalinić shot wide under pressure from Ferreira shortly before his ninth-minute opener, a well-constructed goal that saw Morten Gamst Pedersen play in Pascal Chimbonda, who in turn drilled the ball low across the face of goal for Kalinić to slot home. Chelsea were unusually wasteful in possession and struggled to create clear-cut openings. Even so, Salomon Kalou, Mikel John Obi, Joe Cole, Michael Ballack and Yuri Zhirkov all either forced regulation saves from Paul Robinson or missed the target before the break. Kalou's miss was the most glaring, heading wide from six yards at the far post.

Carlo Ancelotti made a bold triple substitution at half-time, introducing Jeffrey Bruma, Gaël Kakuta and Didier Drogba. It looked like a good decision as, after being on the pitch for just three minutes, Drogba climbed above Ryan Nelsen to head home Florent Malouda's cross. Four minutes later, Chelsea took the lead when Zhirkov collected a loose ball and released Kalou, who closed in on goal before slotting the ball beyond Robinson. Rovers levelled in the 64th minute when Kalinić attempted to head Brett Emerton's deflected cross at the near post. The striker didn't appear to get anything on the ball but, regardless, did enough to distract Hilario and the ball went in at the far post.

Chelsea were reduced to ten men when Kalou limped off; due to the triple change at half-time, they were unable to bring on a replacement. Rovers thought they had snatched a dramatic victory in injury-time but McCarthy's effort was ruled out for offside. Kalinić then forced a good save from Hilário but Chelsea survived to take the match into extra-time.

Rovers' pressure eventually told when the home team regained the lead from the penalty spot early in extra-time. Zhirkov clearly fouled substitute David Hoilett and McCarthy sent Hilário the wrong way from the penalty spot. Ferreira equalised with just about the last action of extra time with a neat finish from a tight angle after Robinson had flapped at a cross.

Kakuta missed the crucial spot kick as Rovers won the shoot-out 4–3 to seal a place in the last four. The 18-year-old struck the ball straight at Paul Robinson, who had earlier sensationally tipped Michael Ballack's spot kick on to the post.

=== Semi-final ===
14 January 2010	Blackburn	0-1	Aston Villa	Blackburn
20.00	McCarthy (yellow card) 89'	Report	Milner 23'; Agbonlahor (yellow card) 38'	Stadium: Ewood Park; Attendance: 18,595; Referee: Mark Clattenburg

Originally scheduled for 5 January 2010, the first leg was postponed as police advised that the travelling conditions for both sets of supporters were unsafe. The game was rearranged for 14 January.

20 January 2010	Aston Villa	6-4	Blackburn	Birmingham
19.45	Warnock 30'; Milner 39' (pen.); Nzonzi 52' (o.g.); Agbonlahor 57'; Heskey 62'; Young 90+3'; Milner (yellow card) 27'; Heskey (yellow card) 60'	[ Report]	Kalinić 10', 26'; Olsson 63'; Emerton 84'; Givet (yellow card) 35'; Samba (red card) 38'; Nzonzi (yellow card) 52'	Stadium: Villa Park; Referee: Martin Atkinson

== First–team squad ==
Updated 28 January 2010

Note: Flags indicate national team as defined under FIFA eligibility rules; some limited exceptions apply. Players may hold more than one non-FIFA nationality.

No.	Pos.	Nation	Player
1	GK	ENG	Paul Robinson
2	DF	DEN	Lars Jacobsen
4	DF	CGO	Christopher Samba (Note: Samba was born in Créteil, France, but also qualified to represent Congo internationally and made his international debut for Congo in 2004.)
5	DF	FRA	Gaël Givet
6	DF	NZL	Ryan Nelsen (captain)
7	MF	AUS	Brett Emerton
8	MF	ENG	David Dunn
9	FW	GRN	Jason Roberts (Note: Roberts was born in Park Royal, England, but also qualified to represent Grenada internationally through his father and French Guiana through his mother and made his international debut for Grenada in 1998.)
11	MF	AUS	Vince Grella
12	MF	NOR	Morten Gamst Pedersen
13	DF	GEO	Zurab Khizanishvili
14	MF	ALG	Amine Linganzi (Note: Linganzi was born in Algiers, Algeria, but also qualified to represent Congo internationally and would make his international debut for Congo in 2013.)
15	MF	FRA	Steven Nzonzi
16	MF	IRL	Steven Reid (Note: Reid was born in Kingston upon Thames, England, and represented them at U-16 level, but also qualified to represent the Republic of Ireland internationally through his grandfather and made his international debut for the Republic of Ireland in 2001.)
17	MF	IRL	Keith Andrews
18	MF	SEN	El Hadji Diouf
19	MF	IRL	Aaron Doran
20	MF	TUR	Yıldıray Baştürk (Note: Baştürk was born in Herne, West Germany (now Germany), but also qualified to represent Turkey internationally and made his international debut for Turkey in 1998.)

No.	Pos.	Nation	Player
21	DF	SWE	Martin Olsson
22	FW	CRO	Nikola Kalinić
23	FW	CAN	David Hoilett
24	MF	IRL	Keith Treacy
25	MF	IRL	Alan Judge
26	FW	ARG	Franco Di Santo (on loan from Chelsea)
27	DF	ESP	Míchel Salgado
28	DF	ENG	Phil Jones
29	MF	IRL	Gavin Gunning
30	FW	NED	Maceo Rigters
32	GK	WAL	Jason Brown (Note: Brown was born in Southwark, England, but also qualified to represent Wales internationally through his grandmother and made his international debut for Wales in May 2006.)
34	GK	ENG	Frank Fielding
36	FW	ENG	Marcus Marshall
38	GK	ENG	Mark Bunn
39	DF	FRA	Pascal Chimbonda (Note: Chimbonda was born in Les Abymes, Guadeloupe, but was raised in France and made his international debut for France in May 2006.)
-	MF	ENG	Alex Marrow
-	MF	ENG	Andy Haworth

Jordan Rhodes

== Squad statistics ==
=== Appearances and goals ===
Current squad

No.	Pos.	Name	League		FA Cup		League Cup		Total
No.	Pos.	Name	Apps	Goals	Apps	Goals	Apps	Goals	Apps	Goals
1	GK	(England) Paul Robinson	35	0	0	0	3	0	38	0
2	DF	(Denmark) Lars Jacobsen	11 (2)	0	0	0	1 (1)	0	12 (3)	0
4	DF	(Republic of the Congo) Christopher Samba	30	4	0	0	3	0	33	4
5	DF	(France) Gaël Givet	33 (1)	2	1	0	3	0	37 (1)	2
6	DF	(New Zealand) Ryan Nelsen	25 (3)	4	0	0	4 (1)	0	29 (4)	4
7	MF	(Australia) Brett Emerton	17 (7)	0	0	0	5	2	22 (7)	2
8	MF	(England) David Dunn	20 (3)	9	1	0	3 (1)	1	24 (4)	10
9	FW	(Grenada) Jason Roberts	15 (14)	5	0	0	1 (1)	0	16 (15)	5
11	MF	(Australia) Vince Grella	10 (5)	0	0	0	0 (2)	0	10 (7)	0
12	MF	(Norway) Morten Gamst Pedersen	27 (6)	3	0 (1)	0	5	2	32 (7)	5
13	DF	(Georgia (country)) Zurab Khizanishvili	0	0	0 (1)	0	1	0	1 (1)	0
15	MF	(France) Steven Nzonzi	33	2	0	0	5	0	38	2
16	MF	(Republic of Ireland) Steven Reid	1 (3)	0	1	0	3 (2)	1	5 (5)	1
17	MF	(Republic of Ireland) Keith Andrews	22 (10)	1	0	0	1 (2)	0	23 (12)	1
18	MF	(Senegal) El Hadji Diouf	24 (2)	3	1	0	0	0	25 (2)	3
19	MF	(Republic of Ireland) Aaron Doran	0	0	0	0	0	0	0	0
20	MF	(Turkey) Yıldıray Baştürk	1	0	0	0	0	0	1	0
21	DF	(Sweden) Martin Olsson	19 (2)	1	1	0	4 (1)	1	24 (3)	2
22	FW	(Croatia) Nikola Kalinić	14 (12)	2	1	1	6	4	21 (12)	7
23	FW	(Canada) David Hoilett	8 (15)	0	0	0	3 (1)	1	11 (16)	1
25	MF	(England) Alan Judge	0	0	0	0	0	0	0	0
26	FW	(Argentina) Franco Di Santo	15 (7)	1	1	0	0 (1)	0	16 (8)	1
27	DF	(Spain) Míchel Salgado	16 (5)	0	1	0	4	1	21 (5)	1
28	DF	(England) Phil Jones	7 (2)	0	1	0	2	0	10 (2)	0
29	DF	(Republic of Ireland) Gavin Gunning	0	0	0	0	0	0	0	0
32	GK	(Wales) Jason Brown	3 (1)	0	1	0	3	0	7 (1)	0
34	GK	(England) Frank Fielding	0	0	0	0	0	0	0	0
38	GK	(England) Mark Bunn	0	0	0	0	0	0	0	0
39	DF	(France) Pascal Chimbonda	22 (2)	1	1	0	3 (1)	0	26 (3)	1

Former players

No.	Pos.	Name	League		FA Cup		League Cup		Total
No.	Pos.	Name	Apps	Goals	Apps	Goals	Apps	Goals	Apps	Goals
(3)	DF	(England) Stephen Warnock	1	0	0	0	0	0	1	0
(10)	FW	(South Africa) Benni McCarthy	7 (7)	1	0	0	3 (2)	3	10 (9)	4
(14)	FW	(Scotland) Paul Gallagher	0 (1)	0	0	0	0	0	0 (1)	0
(20)	MF	(South Africa) Elrio Van Heerden	0	0	0	0	0 (2)	0	0 (2)	0
(24)	MF	(Republic of Ireland) Keith Treacy	0	0	0	0	0	0	0	0

Substitution appearances in brackets

- Last Update: 31 January 2010
- Data does not include appearances/goals obtained whilst at another club
- Substitution appearances in (brackets)
- League – Premier League
- FA Cup – FA Cup
- League Cup – League Cup

=== Starting formations ===
As of 31 January 2010

Formation	Premier League	FA Cup	League Cup	Total
4-4-2	11	1	3	15
4-5-1	13	0	2	15
4-3-3	0	0	1	1

=== Top scorer ===
As of 28 January 2010

P.	Player	Position	Premier League	FA Cup	League Cup	Total
1	(England) David Dunn	Midfielder	9	0	1	10
2	(Croatia) Nikola Kalinić	Forward	2	1	4	7
3	(Norway) Morten Gamst Pedersen	Midfielder	3	0	2	5
4	(South Africa) Benni McCarthy	Forward	1	0	3	4
5	(Grenada) Jason Roberts	Forward	5	0	0	5

=== Most appearances ===
As of 6 May 2010

P.	Player	Position	Premier League	FA Cup	League Cup	Total
1	(Republic of Ireland) Keith Andrews	Midfielder	32	0	3	35
2	(Norway) Morten Gamst Pedersen	Midfielder	33	1	5	39
3	(France) Gaël Givet	Defender	34	1	3	38
4	(England) Paul Robinson	Goalkeeper	35	0	3	38
5	(France) Steven Nzonzi	Midfielder	33	0	5	38

- Substitution appearances counted as full

=== Discipline ===
Current squad

As of 13 May 2010

No.	Pos.	Name	League		FA Cup		League Cup		Total
No.	Pos.	Name	Yellow card	Red card	Yellow card	Red card	Yellow card	Red card	Yellow card	Red card
1	GK	(England) Paul Robinson	1	0	0	0	0	0	1	0
4	DF	(Republic of the Congo) Christopher Samba	5	1	0	0	0	1	5	2
5	DF	(France) Gaël Givet	3	0	0	0	2	0	5	0
6	DF	(New Zealand) Ryan Nelsen	3	0	0	0	0	0	3	0
7	MF	(Australia) Brett Emerton	2	0	0	0	0	0	2	0
8	MF	(England) David Dunn	7	0	0	0	0	0	7	0
11	MF	(Australia) Vince Grella	2	1	0	0	1	0	3	1
12	MF	(Norway) Morten Gamst Pedersen	5	0	0	0	0	0	5	0
15	MF	(France) Steven Nzonzi	6	0	0	0	0	0	6	0
16	MF	(Republic of Ireland) Steven Reid	1	0	0	0	1	0	2	0
17	MF	(Republic of Ireland) Keith Andrews	4	0	0	0	0	0	4	0
18	MF	(Senegal) El Hadji Diouf	3	0	0	1	0	0	3	1
21	DF	(Sweden) Martin Olsson	1	0	0	0	1	0	2	0
22	FW	(Croatia) Nikola Kalinić	2	0	0	0	1	0	3	0
26	FW	(Argentina) Franco Di Santo	3	0	0	0	0	0	3	0
27	DF	(Spain) Míchel Salgado	3	0	1	0	1	0	5	0
32	GK	(Wales) Jason Brown	0	0	0	0	1	0	1	0
39	DF	(France) Pascal Chimbonda	3	0	0	0	0	0	3	0
		TOTALS	54	2	1	1	8	1	63	4

Former players

No.	Pos.	Name	League		FA Cup		League Cup		Total
No.	Pos.	Name	Yellow card	Red card	Yellow card	Red card	Yellow card	Red card	Yellow card	Red card
(3)	DF	(England) Stephen Warnock	1	0	0	0	0	0	1	0
(10)	FW	(South Africa) Benni McCarthy	2	0	0	0	1	0	3	0
(14)	FW	(Scotland) Paul Gallagher	1	0	0	0	0	0	1	0
		TOTALS	4	0	0	0	1	0	5	0

== Transfers ==
=== In ===
Date	Player	Previous club	Cost
2 June 2009	(South Africa) Elrio van Heerden	(Belgium) Club Brugge	Free
26 June 2009	(France) Gaël Givet	(France) Marseille	Undisclosed
29 June 2009	(Denmark) Lars Jacobsen	(England) Everton	Free
3 July 2009	(France) Steven Nzonzi	(France) Amiens	Undisclosed
13 August 2009	(Croatia) Nikola Kalinić	(Croatia) Hajduk Split	£6,000,000
19 August 2009	(Spain) Míchel Salgado	(Spain) Real Madrid	Free
27 August 2009	(France) Pascal Chimbonda	(England) Tottenham Hotspur	Undisclosed
27 January 2010	(Turkey) Yıldıray Baştürk	(Germany) VfB Stuttgart	Free
28 January 2010	(Algeria) Amine Linganzi	(France) Saint-Étienne	Free

=== Out ===
Date	Player	New Club	Cost
22 June 2009	(Paraguay) Roque Santa Cruz	(England) Manchester City	Undisclosed
24 June 2009	(England) Matt Derbyshire	(Greece) Olympiacos	Undisclosed
1 July 2009	(South Africa) Aaron Mokoena	(England) Portsmouth	Free
1 July 2009	(Turkey) Tugay Kerimoğlu	Retired	-
1 July 2009	(Netherlands) André Ooijer	(Netherlands) PSV	Free
21 August 2009	(Scotland) Paul Gallagher	(England) Leicester	Undisclosed
27 August 2009	(England) Stephen Warnock	(England) Aston Villa	Undisclosed
11 January 2010	(South Africa) Elrio van Heerden	(Turkey) Sivasspor	Free
1 February 2010	(South Africa) Benni McCarthy	(England) West Ham	Undisclosed
1 February 2010	(Republic of Ireland) Keith Treacy	(England) Preston North End	Undisclosed

=== Loaned in ===
Date	Player	Club	Return Date
3 August 2009	(Argentina) Franco Di Santo	(England) Chelsea	May 2010

=== Loaned out ===
Date	Player	Club	Return Date
24 July 2009	(Republic of Ireland) Keith Treacy	(England) Sheffield United	December 2009
2 August 2009	(England) Mark Bunn	(England) Sheffield United	May 2010
4 August 2009	(Republic of Ireland) Alan Judge	(England) Plymouth Argyle	January 2010
6 August 2009	(Republic of Ireland) Gavin Gunning	(England) Tranmere Rovers	September 2009
6 August 2009	(England) Alex Marrow	(England) Oldham Athletic	May 2010
6 August 2009	(England) Nick Blackman	(England) Oldham Athletic	January 2010
17 September 2009	(Georgia (country)) Zurab Khizanishvili	(England) Newcastle United	December 2009
29 September 2009	(England) Frank Fielding	(England) Leeds United	November 2009
5 October 2009	(Republic of Ireland) Aaron Doran	(England) MK Dons	November 2009
16 October 2009	(Northern Ireland) Johnny Flynn	(England) Chester City	November 2009
13 November 2009	(England) Andy Haworth	(England) Gateshead	December 2009
19 November 2009	(Republic of Ireland) Steven Reid	(England) Queens Park Rangers	December 2009
26 November 2009	(Northern Ireland) Johnny Flynn	(England) Accrington Stanley	May 2010
22 January 2010	(England) Andy Haworth	(England) Rochdale	June 2010
22 January 2010	(Republic of Ireland) Gavin Gunning	(England) Rotherham United	May 2010
23 January 2010	(England) Marcus Marshall	(England) Rotherham United	May 2010
25 January 2010	(Georgia (country)) Zurab Khizanishvili	(England) Reading	May 2010
1 February 2010	(England) Frank Fielding	(England) Rochdale	May 2010
22 February 2010	(Republic of Ireland) Aaron Doran	(England) Leyton Orient	March 2010
