= Margaret Ssebagereka =

Ugandan politician and women's-rights advocate

District Woman Member of Parliament for Mukono District
- Incumbent
- Assumed office 2001

Personal details
- Born: Margaret Ssebagereka Uganda
- Occupation: Politician, women's rights advocate
- Known for: Co-founder of Forum for Women in Democracy

Margaret Ssebagereka is a Ugandan politician and women's rights advocate. She co-founded the Forum for Women in Democracy (FOWODE) in 1995, held the position of Secretary for Health up to 2001 then was elected District Woman Member of Parliament for Mukono District.

== Career ==
In 1995 Ssebagereka co-founded FOWODE(Forum for Women in Democracy) an organization to promote women's participation in leadership and decision-making in Uganda alongside others such as Winnie Byanyima, etc. She was Secretary for Health until 2001 and was elected Member of Parliament Mukono District.

== Personal life ==
She was married to the late Sam Sebagereka.
