= Embassy of France, Kampala =

- Location: Kampala
- Address: 16 Lumumba Avenue
- Coordinates: 0.32°N 32.57694°E
- Opened: 1962
- Ambassador: Xavier Sticker
- Jurisdiction: Uganda
- Website: ug.diplomatie.gouv.fr

The embassy of France in Uganda is the diplomatic mission of France in Uganda. It is located in Kampala, the capital of Uganda, and its ambassador since 2022 is Xavier Sticker.

== Overview ==
The embassy is located in Kampala, on the hillside, inside the area of Nakasero. It also has a consular section. Across all its departments, it employs around 40 people.

== History ==
The premises of the embassy of France in Kampala were inaugurated in 1999. Its architect is Kirkor Kalayciyan, who designed a red brick building which blends into an urban area dominated by tiled roofs.

The French residence was acquired at the opening of a diplomatic mission in the country, in 1962, and it is also located in the area of Nakasero (at plot 16, Ternan Avenue). It was renovated by the same architect during the construction of the embassy.

== Ambassadors of France in Uganda ==
From	To	Ambassador
1962	1962	M. Smirnov de Grez
1962	1964	Pierre-Jules Meyer
1964	1969	Marcel Flory
1969	1975	Albert Thabault
1975	1979	Pierre-Henri Renard
1979	1982	Jean-Xavier Clément
1982	1986	Jacques Butin
1986	1990	Pierre Cornée
1990	1993	Yannick Gérard
1993	1998	François Descoueyte
1998	2001	René Roudaut
2001	2005	Jean-Bernard Thiant
2005	2007	Bernard Garancher
2007	2010	René Forceville
2010	2013	Aline Kuster-Ménager
2013	2016	Sophie Moal-Makame
2016	2019	Stéphanie Rivoal
2019	2022	Jules-Armand Aniambossou
2022	present	Xavier Sticker

== Diplomatic relations ==
After the independence of Uganda from the United Kingdom, in 1962, France nominated a diplomatic representative in the country. When Idi Amin came to power, France retained good diplomatic relations, but the direction taken by the Ugandan regime distanced it from most Western countries. After Idi Amin's fall, relations were affected by the new government's foreign policy, particularly by the interventions in the Democratic Republic of the Congo in 1996, but they are being rebuilt through more intensive exchanges.

== Consulate ==
=== French community ===
As of 31 December 2016, 333 French citizens are registered with the consular authorities in Uganda.

=== Electoral districts ===
After the law of 22 July 2013 reformed the representation of French citizens living outside of France with the establishment of consular councils within diplomatic missions, French nationals within an electoral district covering Burundi, Kenya, Uganda, Rwanda, Tanzania, Zambia and Zimbabwe have elected 3 consular councillors for a period of 6 years. These councillors have 3 roles:

1. They are locally-based representatives for French citizens living abroad;
2. They belong to one of the fifteen districts which elect among themselves the members of the Assembly of French Citizens Abroad;
3. They are part of the electoral college which elects the senators which represent French citizens living outside of France.

For the election to the Assembly of French Citizens Abroad, until 2014, Uganda belonged to the Nairobi electoral constituency, which also constituted of Burundi, Kenya, Rwanda and Tanzania, and had two seats. Uganda now belongs to the district "Central, Southern and Eastern Africa" headquartered in Libreville and electing 5 of its 37 consular councillors to serve as part of the 90 members of the Assembly of French Citizens abroad.

For the election of deputies representing French citizens living abroad, Uganda falls in the 10th constituency.

== See also ==
- Ministry for Europe and Foreign Affairs (France)
- List of diplomatic missions of France
