= Sidibé =

Sidibé is a Fulani surname that can be found in countries like Mali, Guinea, Senegal, Burkina Faso and Mauritania. A variant of the spelling is "Sidibeh" in English speaking countries like the Gambia and Liberia. Notable people with the surname include:

- Ahmed Sidibé (footballer, born 1974), Mauritanian football manager and former striker
- Ahmed Sidibé (footballer, born 2002), French football defender
- Bilal Sidibé (born 1978), Mauritanian football defender
- Djibril Sidibé (born 1982), Malian football midfielder
- Djibril Sidibé (born 1992), French football defender
- Fadjimata Maman Dioula Sidibé (born 1955), Nigerien politician, Minister of National Education (2010-2011)
- Issaka Sidibé (born 1946), Malian politician
- Julien Mory Sidibé (1927–2003), bishop of Mali
- Konimba Sidibe (born 1956), Malian politician
- Malick Sidibé (1935–2016), Malian photographer
- Mamady Sidibé (born 1979), French-Malian footballer
- Mandé Sidibé (1940–2009), chairman of the board of directors of Ecobank
- Michel Sidibé (born 1952), Executive Director of UNAIDS and Under-Secretary-General of the United Nations
- Odiah Sidibé (born 1970), French sprint athlete
- Rafan Sidibé (born 1984), Malian football player
- Souleymane Sidibé (1949-2022), Malian diplomat and general
- Sol Sidibé full name Souleymane Sidibé (born 2007), English football player

Given name

- Sidibé Aminata Diallo (born 1950), Malian academic and politician

== See also ==
- Gabourey Sidibe (born 1983), American actress
