= Phyllis Chemutai =

Ugandan politician (born 1962)

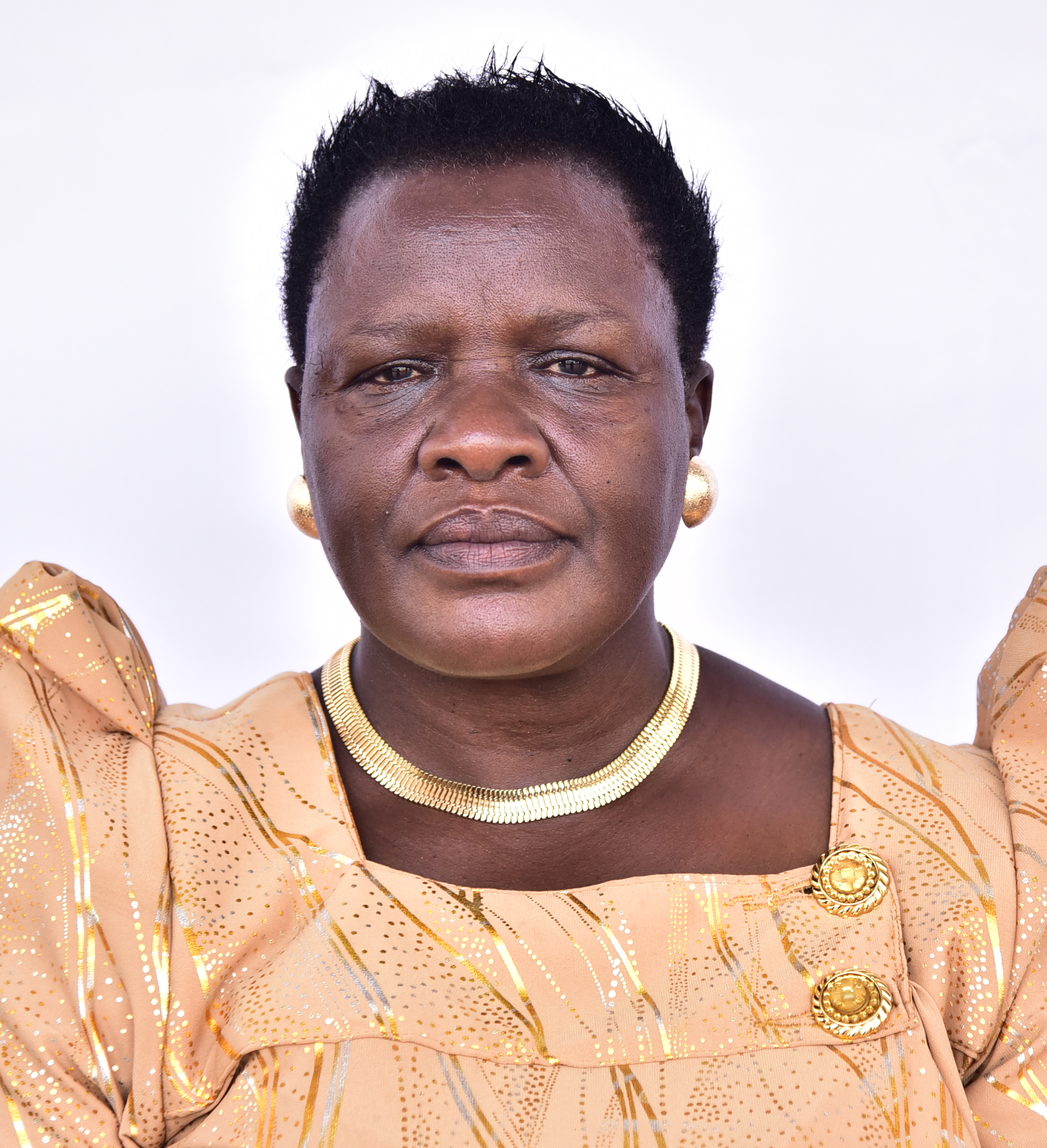
- Phyllis Chemutai

Woman Member of Parliament for Kapchorwa District
- In office 2011–2016

Woman Member of Parliament for Kapchorwa District
- Incumbent
- Assumed office May 2021

Personal details
- Born: June 30, 1962
- Party: National Resistance Movement
- Occupation: Politician

Phyllis Chemutai (born 30 June 1962), is a Ugandan politician representing Kapchorwa district in Parliament of Uganda, and also a minister of state for education and sports.

== Education background ==
Chemutai holds a diploma in education and a Bachelor’s degree in Agriculture from Kyambogo University.

== Political career ==
Chemutai is a member of the governing National Resistance Movement who rose to prominence in 2011 when she defeated Rukiya Chekamondo in the NRM primaries when she garnered 23,028 votes against Chekamondo's 16,358 votes.

In the 2026 elections, Chemutai lost the NRM primaries to Betty Kaali, Kapchorwa's district councilor for persons with disabilities. She contested the loss and the primaries were later nullified by the NRM electoral commission. However, in a turn of events, the NRM electoral commission through its chairperson Tanga Odoi again declared Betty Kaali as the official flag bearer having got 26688 votes against Chemutai's 22803 votes.

However, Chemutai still contested in the 2026 elections as an independent and won the Woman MP seat for Kapchorwa. In the 2026-2031 Uganda cabinet, Chemutai was appointed Minister of state for Education and sports.
