= Tezira Jamwa =

Ugandan politician

Constituent Assembly Delegate
- In office 1994–1995
- Constituency: Tororo

Personal details
- Born: Tororo District, Uganda
- Party: National Resistance Movement
- Education: University of Arkansas (MPA)

Tezira Jamwa is a Ugandan teacher, politician and women's rights activist. She represented Tororo in the 1994 Constituent Assembly and thereafter was the Member of Parliament for West Budama North County in Uganda's sixth parliament (1996–2001). She is a founding member of Forum for Women in Democracy (FOWODE) and also served on Tororo District's Service Commission.

== Background and education ==
Jamwa was born in the Tororo district. She has a bachelor's degree in Social Works and Social Administration. She also has both a post-graduate diploma and a Master of Public Administration degree from the University of Arkansas.

== Career ==
=== Legislative ===
In 1994 Jamwa successfully contested the Constituent Assembly elections to represent the women of Tororo as a Constituent Assembly Delegate (CAD). She served in this position from 1994 to 1995 and later contested the 2001 Parliamentary elections for Member of Parliament for West Budama. She lost to the then-State Minister of Labour, Henry Obbo.

=== Governance ===
In 1994 Jamwa, alongside Winnie Byanyima, Esther Dhugira Opoti, Benigna Mukiibi, Solome Mukisa and Betty Akech Okullo founded Forum for Women in Democracy (FOWODE), a women's empowerment non-governmental organisation

=== Political ===
She was appointed Resident District Commissioner (RDC) for Kaberamaido District, a position she resigned from in 2005 to be eligible for the 2006 Ugandan general elections. However, in 2012, it was reported that she had a running term on the Tororo District Service Commission. She still held the same position in 2015 when she vied for Vice Chairperson of the National Resistance Movement (NRM) Women's League representing the eastern region.
