= Gertrude Kulany =

Ugandan legislator and Member of Parliament (1951–2021)

Gertrude Kulany Honourable

Member of Parliament, Kapchorwa
- Succeeded by: Rukiya Chekamondo

Constituent Assembly Delegate, Kapchorwa

Woman Representative, Kapchorwa District

Personal details
- Born: Gertrude Chelangat; 23 November 1951
- Died: 28 January 2021 (aged 69)
- Party: National Resistance Movement(NRM)
- Children: 4
- Education: Mount Saint Marys Namagunga
- Alma mater: Makerere University
- Occupation: Politician; Anti FGM activist

Gertrude Kulany (23 November 1951 – 28 January 2021) was a Ugandan legislator, politician, and anti-female genital mutilation activist. Kulany served in the Constituent Assembly in 1994, and later represented Kapchorwa District as a Woman Member of Parliament between 2001 and 2006 in Uganda's seventh parliament.

== Background and education ==
Kulany was born to David and Joyce Arapta.

She attended Mount Saint Marys College Namagunga for her secondary education, and then Makerere University for her tertiary education. She also held a diploma in Industrial Methodology and a Certificate in Women's Studies.

== Career ==
=== Politics ===
Kulany was a part of the National Resistance Council between 1989 and 1996. During Uganda's 1994 Ugandan Constituent Assembly election, Kulany was elected as the delegate to represent Kapchorwa district and served in this position until 1995. Later on, she served as the Woman Representative for Kapchorwa in Uganda's seventh parliament from 2001 to 2006.

=== NRM Primary Defeat ===
In the NRM primaries ahead of the 2006 general elections, Kulany was defeated by Rukiya Chakamondo who went on to succeed her as Woman MP for Kapchorwa.

=== Activism ===
Kulany campaigned against Female Genital Mutilation. She opposed the practice prevalent among Sabiny and Pokot communities in Eastern Uganda and submitted evidence in significant legal petitions seeking to outlaw it. Her contributions included firsthand testimony for the Law and Advocacy for Women in Uganda v.Attorney General case, which argued that FGM violated constitutional rights.

During her time in Parliament, she supported efforts to draft legislation criminalizing female circumcision pushing for accountability for both practitioners and promoters of the ritual.

In media interviews and international reports, Kulany discussed the cultural pressures and social challenges faced by women resisting FGM emphasizing education and community sensitization as key tools for change.

=== Administration ===
Kulany was the deputy board chairperson of the National Enterprise Corporation (NEC) (2014–2015). In addition to being a board member at the National Social Security Fund (NSSF), Kulany also deputised as a Director of Research at the National Resistance Movement (NRM) Secretariat from 2005 to 2006.

== Personal life ==
Kulany died of cancer on 28 January 2021. At the time of her death, she was 69 years old and had been treated in hospitals in Kampala, airobi and India for her illness.

== See also ==
- Kapchorwa district
- Parliament of Uganda
- Rukiya Chekamondo
