= The Pearl of Africa =

- Directed by: Jonny von Wallström
- Produced by: Andre Vallström, Rough Studios AB
- Starring: Cleo Kambugu, Nelson Kasaija
- Cinematography: Jonny von Wallström
- Edited by: Jonny von Wallström, Thomas Ernst
- Music by: Rebekka Karijord, Jonny von Wallström
- Release date: April 30, 2016 (Hot Docs International Documentary Festival)
- Running time: 90 Minutes
- Countries: Uganda; Kenya
- Language: English

The Pearl of Africa is a documentary film directed by Johnny von Wallstroem, focusing on the life of Cleopatra Kambugu, a Ugandan born woman who decide to live openly as a trans woman despite hostility towards same-sex relations in the country.

The phrase "Pearl of Africa" is attributed to Winston Churchill who used it to describe Uganda's flora and fauna.

== Overview and synopsis ==
In 2014, when the protagonist and her lover decide to settle down quietly, Uganda passed a homophobic law; later in the year, a Ugandan tabloid, Red Pepper, outed Kambugu, which eventually forced the lovers to flee Uganda. In Sweden, director Johnny von Wallstroem was producing a film about a gay Ugandan refugee. However, the protagonist of the film had cold feet when he feared that his family in Uganda could be harmed. Wallstroem then traveled to Uganda to research stories about LGBT individuals who were committed to express themselves publicly. He was introduced to Kambugu, who initially hesitated but decided to publicly express herself and her gender identity in front of a camera. Both individuals initially collaborated on a seven-part web series, The Pearl of Africa, which led to the process of producing a documentary.

The documentary tells the story of Kambugu, who was born male but transitioned into the woman she always wanted to be despite the hostility and transphobia in her country. It also covers the relationship between Kambugu, who is a trans activist and her lover Nelson, a straight man and their struggles and love for one another.

== Release ==
The film was shown at HotDocs Festival in July 2016, and at Joburg Film Festival in December 2016
