= Primah Kwagala =

Ugandan civil and human rights lawyer

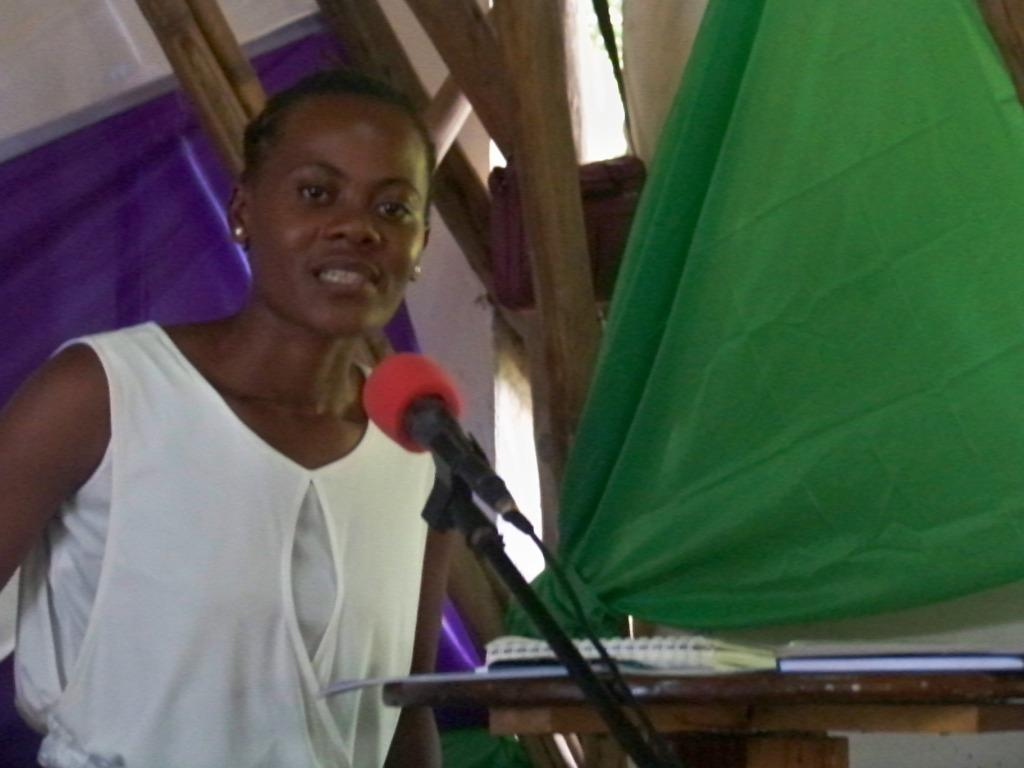
- Primah Kwagala in 2008
- Citizenship: Uganda
- Education: Makerere University (Gender Studies)
- Occupations: Lawyer, human rights activist
- Organization: Women’s Probono Initiative (WPI)
- Known for: Human rights activist
- Notable work: Returned Ugandan women trafficked in the Middle East.; Uncovered the abuse of children by Renee Bach

Primah Kwagala (born 14, October 1987) is a Ugandan civil and human rights lawyer and CEO of the Women’s Probono Initiative (WPI) in Uganda. She has handled cases involving illegal detentions in health facilities, access to emergency obstetric care and to free vital medicines, and more. She is the Chairperson of Female Lawyers in the Uganda Law Society. Kwagala was awarded the 2020 Peace and Reconciliation Prize that was awarded by H.E Albrecht Conze, the German Ambassador in Uganda, H.E Jules-Armand ANIAMBOSSOU who is the Ambassador of France to Uganda and Henry Oryem Okello the State Minister for Foreign Affairs at the 57th Anniversary celebrations of Elysee Treaty. On Women's Day in the year, 2022, she was named by the U. S Embassy in Uganda as one of Uganda's Outstanding women of Courage and she was awarded with EU Human Right Defenders Award 2022.

== Early life and education ==
Kwagala was born to Moses Ngobi who was the secretary-general of Busoga Growers Cooperative Union and Florence Nabirye, who was a secondary school teacher. She was born on 14, October, 1987 in Luuka district in a family of eight children.

She finished her primary education at St.Patrick Kigulu Girls' School, Iganga, joined Iganga Secondary school for O-level and later joined Maryhill High School Mbarara for her A-level. She earned her first degree in 2010 from Makerere University, has a degree in Ethics and Human Rights as well as a Diploma pursued at the Law Development Center. Kwagala graduated with a Master's degree in Sexual and Reproductive Health in Africa and a PhD in Gender Studies at Makerere University.

== Career ==
Kwagala was program manager of strategic litigation, policy and advocacy manager for the Center for Health, Human Rights, and Development. In 2014 and 2018, Kwagala was honored as an outstanding Health and Human Rights Lawyer. In 2012, she was the Advocacy Fellow at the Institute for the Study of Human Rights at Columbia University. Between 2012-2014, she led CEHUR's advocacy program that advocated for legal reform in laws and policies on health in Uganda and the East African region. In 2018, Kwagala was nominated and chosen be a 2018 New Voice Fellow by the Aspen Institute.

== Achievements ==
Through her organization, Kwagala has returned several Ugandan women trafficked in the Middle East. She also uncovered the abuse of children by Renee Bach, an American volunteer who left her home in Virginia to set up a charity to help children in Jinja.She was awarded the Peace and Reconciliation award from the French and German embassies and also nominated in the EU Human Rights Defenders Award.

== Personal life ==
Kwagala loves reading. She is not married although has children, she adopted

== See also ==
- Agather Atuhaire
- Sarah Bireete
