= Joint United Nations Programme on HIV/AIDS =

United Nations organization

Joint United Nations Programme on HIV and AIDS
- Abbreviation: UNAIDS
- Formation: 26 July 1994; 32 years ago
- Type: Non-governmental organization, Joint Programme
- Legal status: Active
- Headquarters: Geneva, Switzerland
- Head: UNAIDS Executive Director; Winnie Byanyima
- Parent organization: United Nations Economic and Social Council
- Website: unaids.org

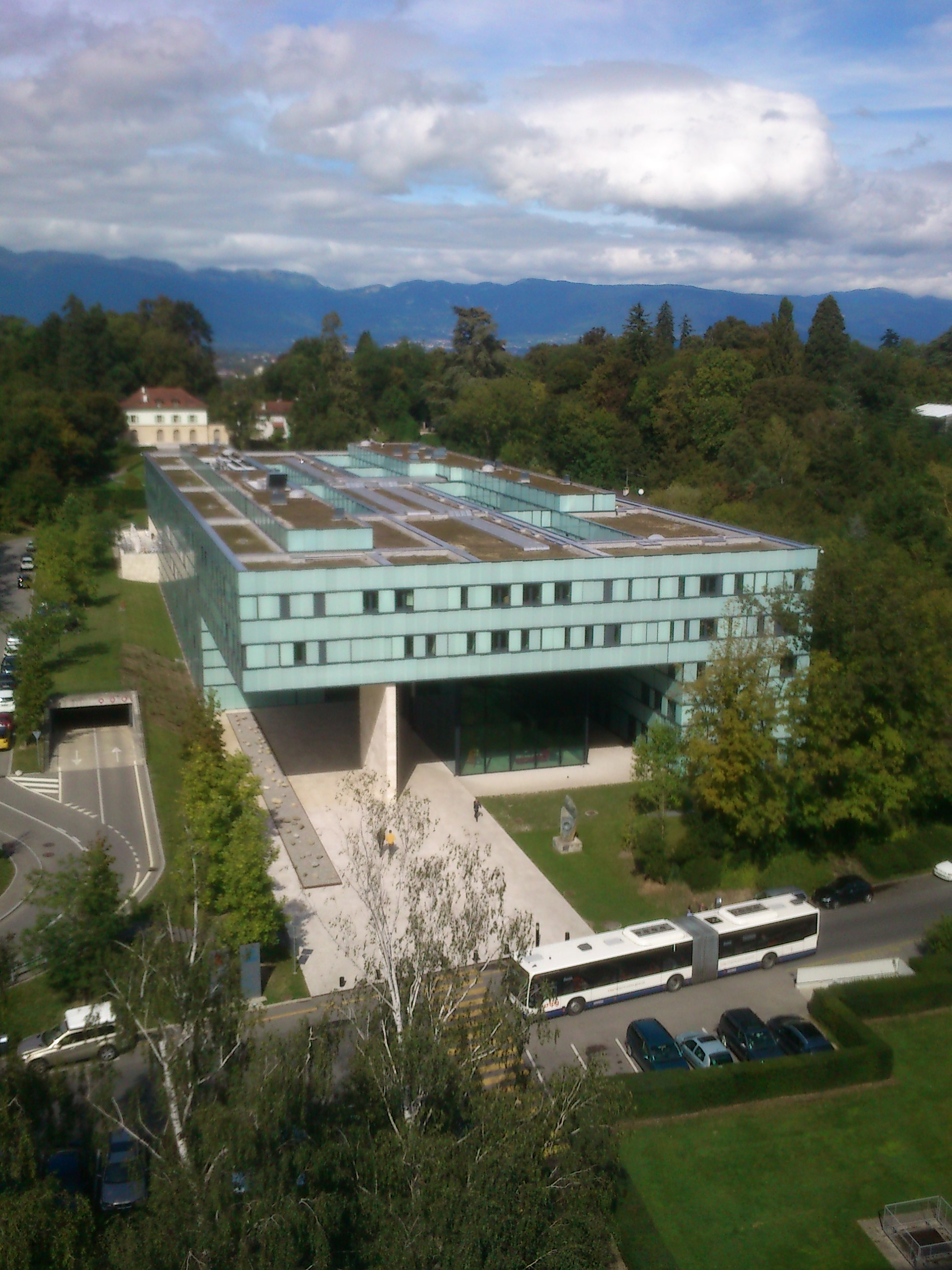
UNAIDS Headquarters building in Geneva, Switzerland

The Joint United Nations Programme on HIV and AIDS (UNAIDS; French: Programme commun des Nations Unies sur le VIH/sida, ONUSIDA) is the main advocate for accelerated, comprehensive and coordinated global action on the HIV/AIDS pandemic.

The mission of UNAIDS is to lead, strengthen and support an expanded response to HIV and AIDS that includes preventing transmission of HIV, providing care and support to those already living with the virus, reducing the vulnerability of individuals and communities to HIV and alleviating the impact of the epidemic. UNAIDS seeks to prevent the HIV/AIDS epidemic from becoming a severe pandemic.

UNAIDS is headquartered in Geneva, Switzerland, where it shares some site facilities with the World Health Organization. It is a member of the United Nations Development Group. Currently, Winnie Byanyima leads UNAIDS as executive director. Former executive directors are Peter Piot (1995–2008) and Michel Sidibé (2009–2019).

UNAIDS regularly publishes articles and reports on the status of the AIDS epidemic, including roadmaps to ending HIV as a public health threat and updates on the current scientific findings on vaccines and treatments for HIV infections and AIDS.

The agency promotes the GIPA principle (greater involvement of people living with HIV) formulated in 1994, and endorsed by the United Nations in 2001 and 2006.

== Goals ==
1. Leadership and advocacy for effective action on the pandemic;
2. Strategic information and technical support to guide efforts against AIDS worldwide;
3. Tracking, monitoring and evaluation of the pandemic and of responses to it;
4. Civil society engagement and the development of strategic partnerships;
5. Mobilization of resources to support an effective response.

== Role ==
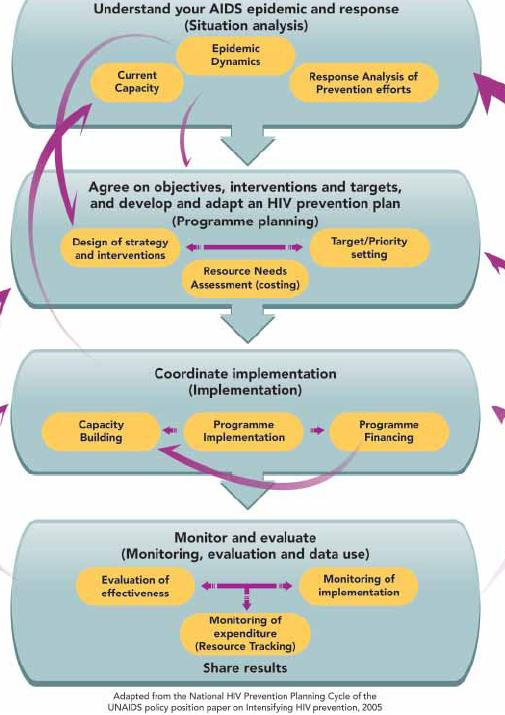
UNAIDS Policy Position Paper on Intensifying HIV Prevention in 2005

The aim of UNAIDS is to help mount and support an expanded response to HIV/AIDS, one that engages the efforts of many sectors and partners from government and civil society.

Established by ECOSOC resolution 1994/24 on 26 July 1994, UNAIDS officially launched in January 1996. The organization is guided by a Programme Coordinating Board with representatives of 22 governments from all geographic regions, the UNAIDS Cosponsors, and five representatives of nongovernmental organizations (NGOs), including associations of people living with HIV/AIDS.

== History ==
While UN AIDS was officially created in 1994 with UN resolution, and launched in 1996, the roots of UN AIDS can be traced back to the first recorded case of HIV/AIDS 15 years prior in 1981, and the launch of the Global Network of People living with HIV/AIDS ("GNP+") started in 1986 by Dietmar Bolle, an HIV positive specialist nurse and activist, who aimed to connect people living with HIV/AIDS around the world.

=== Origin: 1920s–1980 and Pre-HIV/AIDS Crisis ===
It is widely believed that HIV first crossed over from chimpanzees to humans in the 1920s through humans eating chimps infected with simian immunodeficiency virus (SIV), a virus similar to HIV, in what is now the Democratic Republic of Congo. Scientific and medical research determined the chimps hunt and eat two smaller monkey species red-capped mangabeys and greater spot-nosed monkeys which carried two strains of SIV which combined through infection and transmission into "SIVcpz", a virus almost identical to HIV, which eventually spread to humans.

The first "verified" case of HIV was detected retrospectively using a blood sample from 1959 from a man living in what is now the Democratic Republic of Congo, albeit there are believed to be numerous other HIV cases prior based on observed symptoms and patterns of death.

=== 1981 First AIDS Cases Reported ===
The first ever AIDS cases were reported on 5 June 1981 in the United States Center for Disease Control and Prevention (CDC)'s weekly epidemiological digest Morbidity and Mortality Weekly, which described rare pneumonia in five patients and "the possibility of a cellular-immune dysfunction related to a common exposure that predisposes individuals to opportunistic infections such as pneumocystosis and candidiasis". In 1982, the CDC adopted the term AIDS, Acquired Immune Deficiency Syndrome. From 1981 to 1985, doctors around the world in countries such as Belgium and France, and African countries, Zaire, Congo, Rwanda, Tanzania, and Zambia noted they had observed and treated medical cases with similar symptoms as HIV/AIDS in the 1970s. In 1985, the CDC hosted the First International Conference on AIDS in Atlanta.

=== 1981–1994: The Global Response Prior to UNAIDS ===
As Lindsay Knight summarises the understanding and outlook of the early 1980s in her report, UNAIDS: The first ten years, 1996–2006: "No one could have imagined that a few cases of rare diseases damaging the immune system would herald a pandemic that has killed more than all those who died in battle during the whole of the twentieth century." However, views with respect to the speed and success of the initial response to the HIV/AIDS epidemic and crisis are mixed.

The global response to the HIV/AIDS crisis was initially led by the US based Center for Disease Control which discovered the first HIV/AIDS case. A 2011 CDC report "AIDS: the Early Years and the CDC's Response", makes the case that it is due to the CDC's rapid and effective approach, and staff, that the virus was even discovered in the first place. The report further argues that the CDC's approach, along with partnerships with the US Food and Drug Administration, and the National Institutes of Health, are the reason that initial recommendations for diagnosis, treatment, and containment were developed, issued and disseminated so quickly (within 1–2 years of first reported case), The report states that the CDC's "excellent surveillance, rapid identification, innovative science, committed persons", among other factors help to "illustrate the power of epidemiologic investigation in understanding and preventing new diseases, even in the absence of an identified cause" and that the "CDC's reputation and staff accomplishments led to the formation of the Global AIDS program."

Critics of the global response to the HIV/AIDS crisis prior to UNAIDS assert that the initial response was slow, faltering, negligent, and exacerbated the crisis which could have been contained more expeditiously if it were not for failures of leadership, missed opportunities, wasted time, among other factors. One book which examines the global response, and describes both the positive and negative aspects states that during the first fifteen years of the HIV/AIDS crisis, "most of the world's leaders, in all sectors of society, displayed a staggering indifference to the growing challenge of this new epidemic." It explains that a combination of factors – (1) biases and stereotyped views that those ill were only from stigmatized communities such as sex workers, men who have sex with men, drug users, migrants, among others, as well as (2) political issues such as countries not wanting to admit there was a crisis and taking steps to block journalists and media reports on the breakout, (3) politicians falsely believing that the disease was limited to lower income countries with less developed medical and healthcare systems, and some politicians fear of associating their own country with sex and death – all led to a slow response, and low levels of funding for research, treatment, and support at a time when greater actions could have been taken. Other reasons for delays include some scientists dismissing concerns about HIV/AIDS becoming a global pandemic as unnecessarily alarmist.

=== Sexual harassment scandal ===
Sidibé offered his resignation from his post as head of UNAIDS following an expert report on sexual harassment in the agency that criticized his "defective leadership". Initially, when allegations surfaced in mid-2018, Sidibe refused to quit. In response to heightened scrutiny and reports of his gross mismanagement, however, Sidibe informed the agency's board on 13 December 2018 that he would leave his post in June 2019.

A panel of independent experts released a report on 13 December 2018 saying Sidibe was overseeing a "patriarchal" workplace and promoting a "cult of personality" centred on him as the all-powerful chief. The experts further said the situation could not be changed unless Sidibe, a native of Mali who has headed the UN agency for nine years, resigned.

One official with ties to senior management at the UNAIDS Geneva secretariat also noted, under Sidibe's leadership, that "UNAids mirrors the whole UN as a 'boys club' with hierarchical and patriarchal culture of discrimination, lack of transparency and accountability that enables harassment."

Sidibe denied claims that he tried to force an employee to drop allegations that she was sexually assaulted by his former deputy. Despite the scathing report, he insisted he was the right man to turn around the organisation, a claim which had been roundly rejected.

== Staff, sponsors and partners ==
=== Cosponsors ===
- The Office of the United Nations High Commissioner for Refugees (UNHCR)
- United Nations Children's Fund (UNICEF)
- World Food Programme (WFP)
- United Nations Development Programme (UNDP)
- United Nations Population Fund (UNFPA)
- United Nations Office on Drugs and Crime (UNODC)
- International Labour Organization (ILO)
- United Nations Educational, Scientific and Cultural Organization (UNESCO)
- World Health Organization (WHO)
- World Bank
- UN Women

The co-sponsors and the UNAIDS Secretariat form the Committee of Cosponsoring Organizations, which meets twice each year.

=== Leadership ===
The executive director of UNAIDS is Winnie Byanyima, who assumed the role on 1 November 2019. Peter Piot was the first executive director of UNAIDS. He served from its inception in 1995 until 2008, when he departed to lead the Institute for Global Health at Imperial College London. On 1 January 2009, Michel Sidibé became the new executive director of UNAIDS until 2019 when he was appointed as Minister of Health and Social Affairs of Mali. Following Mr Sidibé's departure and until the appointment of Ms Byanyima, Gunilla Carlsson, the Deputy Executive Director, Management and Governance, was appointed as UNAIDS Executive Director, ad interim. Shannon Hader is the Deputy Executive Director, Programme.

=== Partnerships ===
The United Nations Declaration Commitment on HIV/AIDS provides the guiding framework for UNAIDS action. Promoting partnerships among various stakeholders is reflected within the leadership section of the Declaration of Commitment. In particular, it calls for complementation of government efforts by the full and active participation of civil society, the business community and the private sector through:

- Establishing and strengthening mechanisms that involve civil society including faith-based organizations (FBOs), the private sector, and people living with HIV/AIDS at all levels
- Encouraging and supporting local and national organizations to expand and strengthen regional partnerships, coalitions and networks
- Full participation of people living with HIV/AIDS (PLWHA), those in vulnerable groups and people mostly at risk, particularly young people
- Addressing issue of stigma and discrimination.

UNAIDS works to promote partnerships among and between this diverse and broad range of non-state entities. This calls for increases in both the number of new actors, as well as in innovative ways of working, to facilitate increased capacity of non-state entities to respond effectively to the epidemic at all levels.

With the momentum generated by the UN Special Session on HIV/AIDS, the main challenges are to:

- Sustain and deepen involvement of those contributing and critical to the response such as PLWHA organizations
- Move beyond the organizations already involved and reach out to optimally engage a broad range of sectors/actors.

UNAIDS has collaborated with the Roman Catholic Church, especially Caritas Internationalis, in the fight against AIDS, something which materialized in a December 2005 message by Pope Benedict XVI. However, it indicated in a 2009 communiqué that it did not agree with the Pope's statement that condoms were unhelpful in AIDS prevention, instead calling them "essential".

==== From policy to action ====
In engaging non-state entities in an expanded response to the epidemic, the UNAIDS Secretariat:

- Fosters and supports global, regional and country level partnerships which include linkages between and among civil society, private sector, philanthropy, media, and with particular attention to organizations of people living with HIV/AIDS
- Supports governments and UN agencies in developing partnerships with non-state entities. This includes support for approaches intended to increase participation, improve connectedness of efforts and strengthen the various participants' capacity for action.

=== Donors ===
As the main advocate for global action on HIV/AIDS, UNAIDS leads, strengthens and supports an expanded response aimed at preventing the transmission of HIV, providing care and support, reducing the vulnerability of individuals and communities to HIV/AIDS, and alleviating the impact of the epidemic. To fulfil this mandate, UNAIDS is supported by voluntary contributions from governments, foundations, corporations, private groups (for example, students, universities, sporting clubs, etc.) and individuals.

In 2003, more than US$118.5 million was received from 30 governments, philanthropic organizations, individuals from around the world and others. The largest donors were the Netherlands followed by Norway, the United States, Sweden, the United Kingdom and Japan. In 2004, 35 governments contributed to UNAIDS including India.

In 2020 UNAIDS received US$ 247.2 million in 2020, in voluntary donations. In 2021, US$ 171.4 million in core funding was made available by twenty-seven governments, with the US leading donating $45,000,000, followed by Sweden and the Netherlands. In addition, In 2021, non-core resources amounting to US$ 75.9 million were made available to UNAIDS, led by the US, with $53,807,294, followed by the UNFPA and Russia. In November 2022, the UNAIDS had a discussion about the $35 million funding gap in the organization's minimum operating budget of $187 million. They believe this situation to be aggravated by the Russian invasion of Ukraine and movements in currency exchange markets. A month later, Australia agreed to a five year partnership with UNAIDS, committing AUD 25 million from 2022 to 2027 to the cause.

== UNAIDS Goodwill Ambassadors ==
UNAIDS engages political figures, celebrities, and subject matter experts as Ambassadors, and advocates, on a country, regional, and global level, to advocate for its agenda and policies.

UNAIDS has several Goodwill Ambassadors who help strengthen awareness of the organisation's work.

=== Goodwill Ambassadors ===
- Princess Stéphanie of Monaco
- Her Royal Highness Princess Soamsawali Krom Muen Suddhanarinatha of Thailand
- King Oyo Nyimba Kabamba Iguru Rukiidi IV of the Tooro Kingdom in Uganda
- Pia Alonzo Wurtzbach
- Jenna Ortega
- Racheal Kundananji
- Oum
- Funke Akindele
- King of Buganda
- King William Nadiope IV of the Busoga region

=== First ladies ===
- First Lady of Cameroon Chantal Biya
- First Lady of Côte d'Ivoire Dominique Ouattara
- First Lady of Rwanda Jeannette Kagame
- First Lady of Sierra Leone Fatima Maada Bio

== See also ==
- Jan Beagle
- International Partnership for Microbicides
- Prince Leopold Institute of Tropical Medicine (Belgium)
- World AIDS Day
- Leopold Zekeng
