= Rukiya Chekamondo =

Ugandan politician (born 1965)

- Born: 7 October 1965 (age 61); Uganda
- Citizenship: Uganda
- Education: Kyambogo University (Diploma in Education); Makerere University (BA in English Literature) (MSc in Language Education)
- Occupations: Educator & Politician
- Years active: 1986–present
- Known for: Politics

Rukiya Kulany Chekamondo (born 7 October 1965), sometimes spelled as Rukia Kulany Chekamondo, is a Ugandan educator and politician. She was the State Minister for Privatization in the Ministry of Finance, from June 2006 until May 2011. In the cabinet reshuffle of 27 May 2011, she was dropped from the cabinet and replaced by Aston Kajara. She also served as the elected Member of Parliament (MP), for Kapchorwa District Women's Representative, from 2006 until 2011. During the 2011 national elections, she was defeated by the current incumbent MP, Phyllis Chemutai, an Independent politician.

== Early life and education ==
Rukiya Kulany Chekamondo was born on 7 October 1965. She obtained her Grade III Certificate in Education in 1986 from the Institute of Teacher Education (ITEK), one of the institutions that coalesced to become Kyambogo University. She went on to obtain the Diploma in Secondary Education in 1993, also from ITEK. Her degree of Bachelor of Education in the English Language and English Literature, was obtained in 1999, from Makerere University, Uganda's oldest university, established in 1922. She also holds Postgraduate Diplomas in Education Planning & Management (1999), and in Guidance & Counseling (2001), both from ITEK. Her Master of Education degree in Language Education and English Literature was obtained in 2004 from Makerere University.

== Career ==
Chekamondo has been a teacher since she obtained her first teaching certificate in 1986. Between 1993 and 1995, she served a Matron, at Bilal Islamic Institute, a school in Kampala, Uganda's capital city. She joined politics in 2006, contesting for the Kapchorwa District, Women's Representative Constituency on the National Resistance Movement (NRM), political party ticket. She won, and on 1 June 2006, she was appointed Minister of State for Privatization. During March 2011, she lost her parliamentary seat and during May 2011, she was dropped from the cabinet in a reshuffle.

== Personal life ==
Rukiya Chekamondo is married. He belongs to the National Resistance Movement political party. Her interests include reading, research and gender issues.

== See also ==
- Parliament of Uganda
- Cabinet of Uganda
- Kapchorwa District
