= Michel Sidibé =

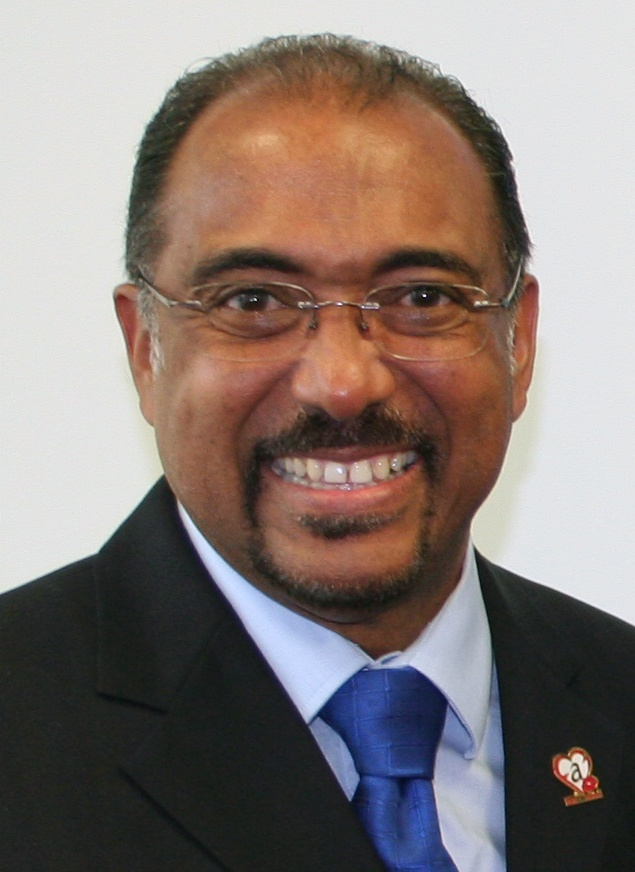
- Born: 1952 (age 73–74); Mali
- Occupations: Minister of Health and Social Affairs of Mali
- Writing career
- Notable awards: Medal of Francysk Skaryna

Dr. Michel Sidibé (born 1952 in Mali) is the African Union Special Envoy for the African Medicines Agency (AMA). He was the Minister of Health and Social Affairs of Mali. Sidibé was the second Executive Director of UNAIDS, serving from January 2009 until May 2019. He held the rank of Under-Secretary-General.

== Biography ==
Michel Hamala Sidibé was born in Medina Koura (Bamako). After completing his secondary education in Mali and university degrees in economics, international development, and social planning in France, he began his professional career as the first Country Director of Terre des Hommes France in Mali in the Timbuktu region, working to improve the health and well-being of the nomadic Tuareg populations. In 1982, he formulated and launched the first semi-sedentarization program for the nomadic populations of the Timbuktu region. In 1984, Dr. Sidibe became a founding member of the CCA-ONG, which brings together 111 national and international NGOs working in Mali to coordinate actions in the field and ensure consultation between the NGOs. In 1987, he joined the United Nations Children's Fund (UNICEF) in the Democratic Republic of Congo. As Program Manager, he led the Expanded Program on Immunization (EPI) planning and implementation, designed to cover 30 million people in the country.

== Scandal and resignation ==
Sidibé offered his resignation from his post as head of UNAIDS following an expert report on sexual harassment in the agency that criticized his "defective leadership." Initially, when allegations surfaced in mid-2018, Sidibé refused to resign. In response to heightened scrutiny and reports of his gross mismanagement, however, Sidibé informed the agency's board on 13 December 2018 that he would leave his post in June 2019.

A panel of independent experts released a report on 13 December 2018 saying Sidibé was overseeing a "patriarchal" workplace and promoting a "cult of personality" centered on him as the all-powerful chief. The experts noted the situation could not be changed unless Sidibé resigned.

== Other activities ==
- International Gender Champions (IGC), Member
- Calouste Gulbenkian Prize for Human Rights, Member of the Jury (since 2017)
