= Konimba Sidibe =

Malian politician

- Born: 18 October 1956; N’Djiballa, Dioïla Cercle, Mali
- Occupation: Politician

Konimba Sidibe (born 18 October 1956) is a Malian politician. He serves as the Malian Minister Investment Promotion & the Private Sector.

== Early life ==
Konimba Sidibe was born on 18 October 1956 in N’Djiballa, Dioïla Cercle, Mali. He earned a doctorate in economics from a French university. While he was a student, he joined the Black African Students Federation in France.

== Career ==
Sidibe returned to Mali in 1985; by 1991, he was in charge of the ministry of public finance. He joined the National Congress for Democratic Initiative. He later co-founded the Party for National Rebirth. In April 2013, he founded a new political party known as the Mouvement pour un destin commun (Modec), and he ran in the 2013 Malian presidential election.

As of 2016, Sidibe serves as the Malian Minister Investment Promotion & the Private Sector.
