= Cleopatra Kambugu Kentaro =

Ugandan transgender activist

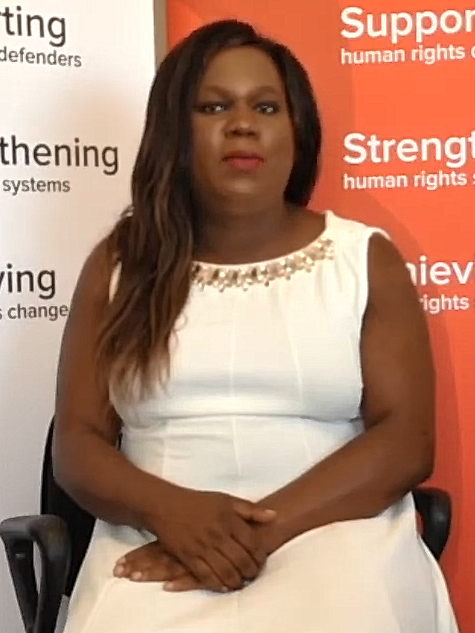
- Kentaro in 2017
- Born: 1984 (age 41–42); Bakuli, Uganda
- Education: Makerere University (BSc) (MSc)
- Occupation: Human rights activist
- Website: Cleopatra Kambugu on LinkedIn

Cleopatra Kambugu Kentaro is a Ugandan transgender woman and human rights activist, advocating for equality and social justice with particular focus on sex workers and gender non-conforming communities. Kentaro is recognised for her advocacy and was featured in the 2016 award-winning feature-length documentary The Pearl of Africa.

== Early life ==
Cleopatra Kambugu Kentaro was born in 1984. She grew up with 11 siblings in Bakuli, a suburb on the outskirts of Kampala, Uganda. During her childhood, she experienced hardships among her peers as she transitioned into a transgender girl.

It is worth noting the stigma surrounding gender nonconformity in Africa. Most notably, the word transgender is absent in the local Ugandan language, Luganda. Many transgender Ugandans have been abused or driven out of their homes, most of the time by their own families. Because of this, the Ugandan transgender community often must exist underground.

== Career ==
The struggle for LGBT rights here in East Africa is very particular to our conditions; we’re fighting in a whole different context. We don’t talk about sex in Africa, so breaking down the stigma of being lesbian, gay or bisexual is tough. It’s what made the HIV struggle so difficult.

— Cleopatra Kambugu Kentaro, Huck magazine interview, 2016

Cleo obtained a Bachelor of Science in Agriculture (crop pathology, biotech, and genetics) at the Makerere University Kampala College of Agricultural and Environmental Sciences.

She advocates for open discussion of gender and sexuality. She works as a Director of Programmes for the East African Sexual Health and Rights Initiative (UHAI EASHRI), supporting the sexuality, health, and human rights of minorities. Kentaro initially joined as Programmes Assistant, but has risen to become the Grant Administrator, where she is tasked with back door grants management.Her work has grown the grant making docket substantially since she joined. Kentaro is also a member on the Astraea Lesbian Foundation's activist advisory Board, where she brings an activist and philanthropist perspective.

In addition, Kentaro works as a program officer with the Trans Support Initiative Uganda (TSIU), an organization that fights for social justice for transgender, intersex, and gender non-conforming citizens. Due to the stigma surrounding transgender people and other LGBTQIA+ people, the organization has very few members. In 2013, there were only 45 people working with the TSIU.

Kentaro earned a Masters of Science in Molecular Biology and Biotechnology from the Makerere University College of Veterinary Medicine Animal Resources and Biosecurity. She has worked on several different projects with the National Biotechnology Centre and the National Agricultural Crop Resources Research Institute, mostly focusing on the molecular biology of the East African Highland Banana and cassava, with a goal of alleviating poverty and famine.

== Advocacy ==
Kentaro began to question her gender identity during her studies at the university, first researching conceptions of non-binary gender in different cultures through the library and Internet. Then, around the age of 23, she began to discover the LGBTQ+ community in Uganda.

On 20 December 2013, the Uganda Anti-Homosexuality Act was passed, effectively outlawing homosexuality in Uganda. One week later, Kentaro was publicly outed as transgender in 2013 on the cover of Uganda's biggest tabloid, Red Pepper. Kentaro was subsequently forced to flee Uganda and found refuge in Kenya.

== Personal life ==
Kentaro and her fiancé, Nelson, met in high school where they were in the same class. When Nelson began dating Kentaro's friend, he confided in her about the relationship. As adults, the two reconnected. They began seeing each other, and were together nearly three years before getting engaged.

In October 2021, she became the first Ugandan to have a change of gender legally recognized.

== The Pearl of Africa ==
Kentaro began sharing her story in the popular webseries The Pearl of Africa, which was adapted into a feature-length documentary that premiered on April 30, 2016 at the Hot Docs Canadian International Documentary Film Festival. In The Pearl of Africa, Kentaro undertakes "an intimate journey beyond binary restrictions to discover her identity", a process she noted as difficult against African norms of masculinity. Director Jonny Von Wallström followed Kentaro and her lover Nelson for 18 months, during which Kentaro bravely worked to improve the welfare of Uganda's LGBT community in spite of escalating discrimination.

The series inspired an Indiegogo campaign that successfully raised more than $10,000 for gender reassignment surgery in Thailand.
