= 1996 Ugandan parliamentary election =

Parliamentary elections were held in Uganda on 27 June 1996, following the adoption of a new constitution in October 1995. The new constitution banned political parties, so all candidates ran as independents. The 276 seats in the new Parliament were contested by 814 candidates, of which 156 were won by supporters of the National Resistance Movement. Voter turnout was 56%.

== Results ==
Party	Votes	%	Seats
Independents	4,665,185	100.00	214
Appointed or indirectly-elected members			69
Total	4,665,185	100.00	283
Valid votes	4,665,185	98.16	
Invalid/blank votes	87,385	1.84	
Total votes	4,752,570	100.00	
Registered voters/turnout	8,492,154	55.96	
Source: Nohlen et al.
