= Patricia Munabi Babiiha =

Ugandan lawyer and human rights activist

- Education: Bachelor's degree in Laws LLB (Hons) Makerere University, postgraduate diploma in Legal Practice
- Occupations: Lawyer, human rights activist, executive director
- Spouse: Peter Babiiha

Patricia Munabi Babiha is a Ugandan lawyer, feminist and human rights activist.

She is the executive director of Forum for Women in Democracy (FOWODE) a non-governmental organisation that promotes women's participation in leadership and decision-making, gender equality and democratic governance in Uganda.

== Education and background ==
Babiha is a lawyer by profession she attended Gayaza High School before studying law at Makerere University, where she obtained a Bachelor of Laws degree. She later obtained a postgraduate diploma in legal practice from the Law Development Centre.

== Career ==
Babiha serves as the executive director of Forum for Women in Democracy (FOWODE) a Ugandan women's rights organisation.

By May 2010, Babiiha was serving as executive director of FOWODE. During the period leading up to Uganda's 2011 general elections, she was involved in the organisation's efforts to increase women's participation in electoral politics. These included voter and civic education, training women to organise and manage elections, and preparing a Women in Politics Conference held from 14 to 16 June 2010.

In 2019, she was identified as a board member of the African Women's Development and Communication Network (FEMNET) and a member of the Uganda Feminist Forum.

In 2023, Babiiha commented in an interview on the need for support systems and safety networks for women. Her commentary discussed gender-based violence, forced marriage and the social conditions that affect women's access to safety and leadership opportunities.

== Personal life ==
Babiha is married to Peter Babiiha, son of the late John Babiiha, who served as the vice president during the regime.
