= Jules-Armand Aniambossou =

French - Beninese diplomat

His Excellency Jules-Armand Aniambossou
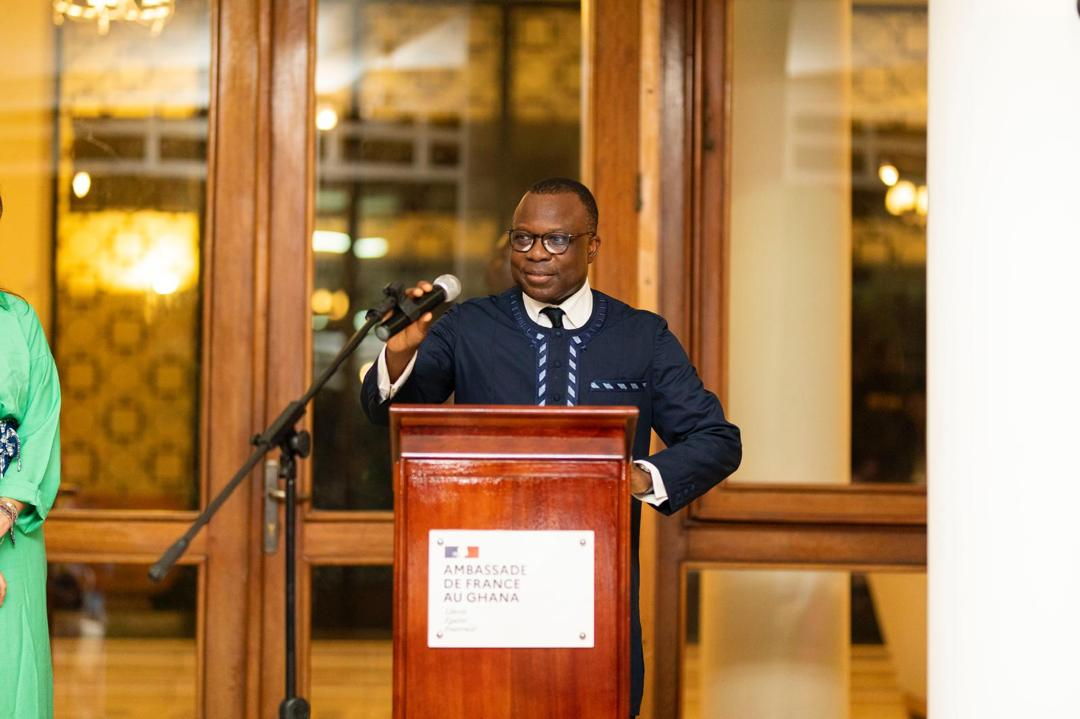
- Incumbent
- Assumed office November 2022
- President: Emmanuel Macron
- Preceded by: Anne Sophie Avé

Ambassador of France to Uganda
- In office July 2019 – October 2022
- President: Emmanuel Macron
- Succeeded by: Xavier Sticker

Coordinator of the Presidential Council for Africa
- In office June 2018 – May 2019

Personal details
- Born: May 1962 (age 64) Cotonou, Benin
- Education: École des Mines de Douai; ÉNA
- Occupation: Ambassador of France to Ghana

Jules-Armand Aniambossou (born 18 May 1962 in Cotonou, Benin), is a Franco-Beninese personality, and a diplomat who worked as an ambassador for both countries. He is the current French Ambassador to Ghana.

in 2013, he was the Benin Ambassador to France, with accreditation as a non-resident to the United Kingdom, Spain and Greece. He was the former General Manager for Africa and Overseas of the Duval Group, as well as former Coordinator of the Presidential Council for Africa from June 2018, then became the Ambassador of France to Uganda from May 2019 to October 2022, before becoming the Ambassador of France to Ghana in November 2022.

== Biography ==
=== Formation ===
Aniambossou holds a degree in engineering from the Ecole des Mines de Douai in France, which he obtained in 1989. Having worked in industry and the civil service at the start of his professional career, he went to the Ecole Nationale d’Administration (ENA) in 2002, which he graduated from two years later. He was part of the graduating class Léopold Sédar Senghor and was assigned to the Prefecture department (French Ministry of the Interior).

=== Career ===
Aniambossou started his professional career in 1989 at Altadis (formerly SEITA) as a project engineer at the research centre for tobacco technologies. In 1992 he passed the competitive examination for the Ministry of Industry and was appointed as an industrial and mining engineer. In this department he carried out the duties of Head of the department subdivision of Indre from 1989 to 1996 and Head of the department subdivision of Loir et Cher from 1996 to 1999. These local responsibilities enabled him to manage teams offering a wide range of skills and expertise, covering in particular areas of intervention, such as local authority aid and subsidies (at state, regional and European Commission level) aimed at investing in and reinforcing the management of SME-SMIs and intermediate-sized enterprises, protection of the industrial environment (legislation governing classified facilities and water in particular), mines and quarries and the promotion of ICT in SMEs, SMIs and intermediate-sized enterprises.

In 2000 he joined the central administration in the Ministry of Industry in the department for regional action and the promotion of industry (DARPMI) where he was in charge of developing and promoting SMIs by managing the aid granted to the Ministry of Industry for investing in SMEs. He continued in this position until 2002, the year he went to ENA.

When he left ENA in 2004, his first position was as a special adviser in the department for public liberties and legal action (DLPAJ) in the Ministry of the Interior before he took up his position in the Prefecture department. From 2004 to 2006, he was first appointed as deputy secretary general of the prefecture of the North, and then director of the cabinet of the Prefect of the Champagne-Ardennes region, from 2006 to 2007, before taking up an appointment in the private sector.

As part of deciding on this appointment, Aniambossou chose the private sector, which gave him the chance to join the power operator POWEO, where he served as secretary general from 2007 to 2009, a position he continued to occupy from de 2009 to 2011 as part of a sabbatical. From 2011 to 2013 he served as administrator and director of institutional relations for EOLES-RES, the French subsidiary of the UK operator in the field of renewable energies.

From 2013 to 2016, Aniambossou was Ambassador of Benin in France, Great Britain and Greece, for the OECD, OIF and UNWTO.

In June 2018, Aniambossou joined the Presidential Council for Africa, an organization created by President Emmanuel Macron to put a new face to the relationship between Africa and France. He was appointed by President Macron as Coordinator of the Presidential Council for Africa (CPA), a body created by President Emmanuel Macron as a means of renewing relations between France and Africa. As an instrument for consultation and supporting decision-making, the CPA, which reports to the French president, helps convey a vision of relations between France and the African continent which is particularly focused on the future and on the expectations of young people and civil societies in both Africa and France.

Aniambossou was in May 2019 named Ambassador of France to Uganda, a post he took up in July 2019.
