= 1994 Ugandan Constituent Assembly election =

1994 election for Uganda's Constituent Assembly

Constituent Assembly elections were held in Uganda on 28 March 1994 to elect 214 of the 284 members of an Assembly tasked with drawing up the country's new constitution. Although all candidates formally ran as independents, it was estimated that 146 of the 214 elected members were representatives of the National Resistance Movement, while the other 68 members viewed as being members of the opposition (the Conservative Party, Democratic Party, National Liberal Party and the Uganda People's Congress) formed the National Caucus for Democracy. A further 70 members were appointed, with each registered political party nominating two members and each of the 39 districts nominating a female representative. A further ten members were nominated by the Army, four by the National Youth Council, two by the National Organization of Trade Unions and one by the National Union of Disabled People.

Following the promulgation of the new constitution, presidential and parliamentary elections were held in 1996.

== Results ==
Party	Votes	%	Seats
Independents	5,694,797	100.00	214
Appointed members			70
Total	5,694,797	100.00	284
Valid votes	5,694,797	96.39	
Invalid/blank votes	213,493	3.61	
Total votes	5,908,290	100.00	
Registered voters/turnout	7,180,514	82.28	
Source: African Elections Database, Nohlen et al.
