= Winnie Byanyima =

20th and 21st-century Ugandan aeronautical engineer, politician and diplomat

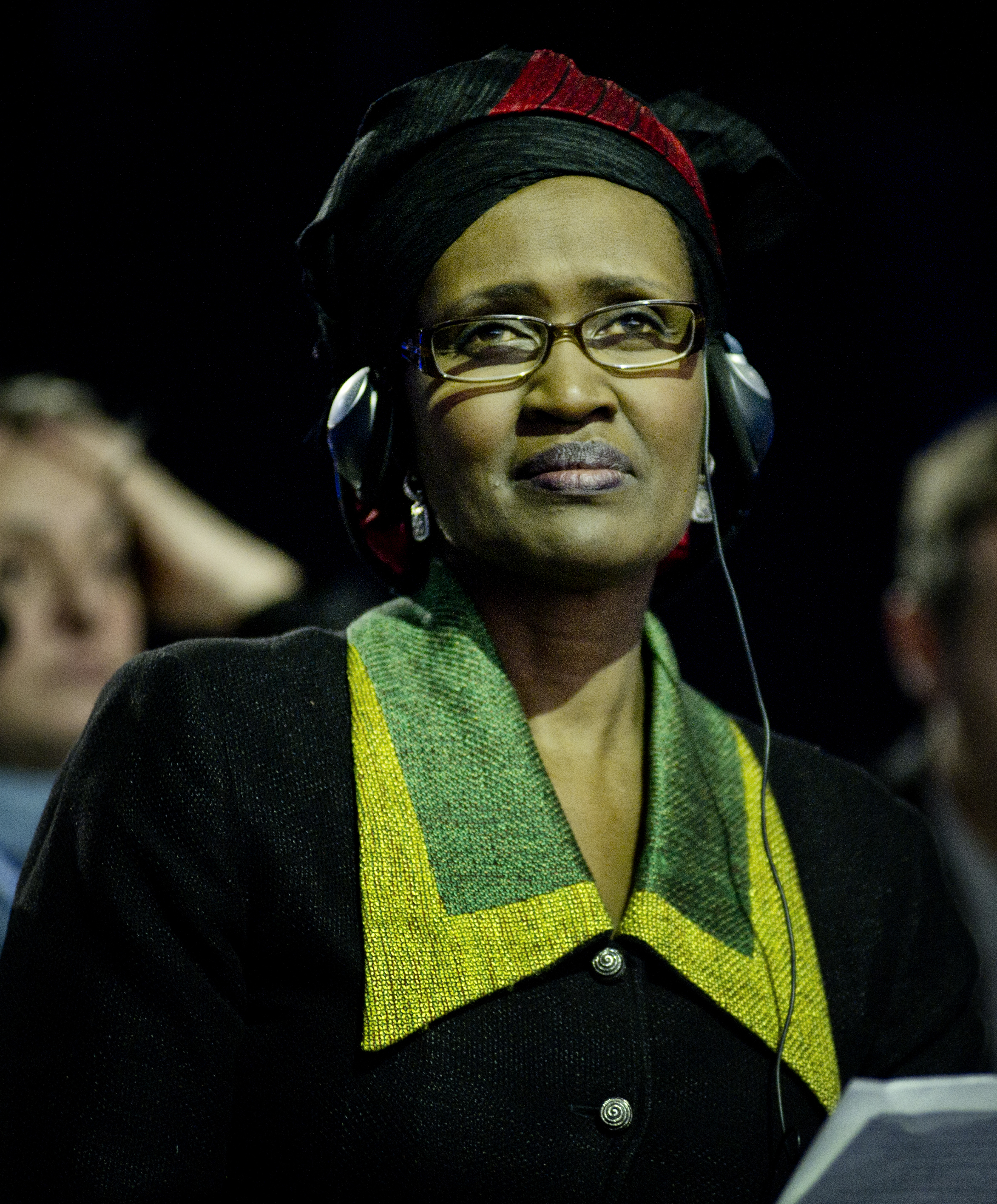
- Byanyima in 2015
- Born: 13 January 1959 (age 67); Mbarara, Uganda
- Citizenship: Uganda
- Education: University of Manchester (Bachelor of Science in aeronautical engineering); Cranfield University (Master of Science in mechanical engineering)
- Occupations: Engineer, politician, and diplomat
- Years active: 1981–present
- Political party: Forum for Democratic Change (since 2004); National Resistance Movement (until 2000)
- Spouse: Kizza Besigye

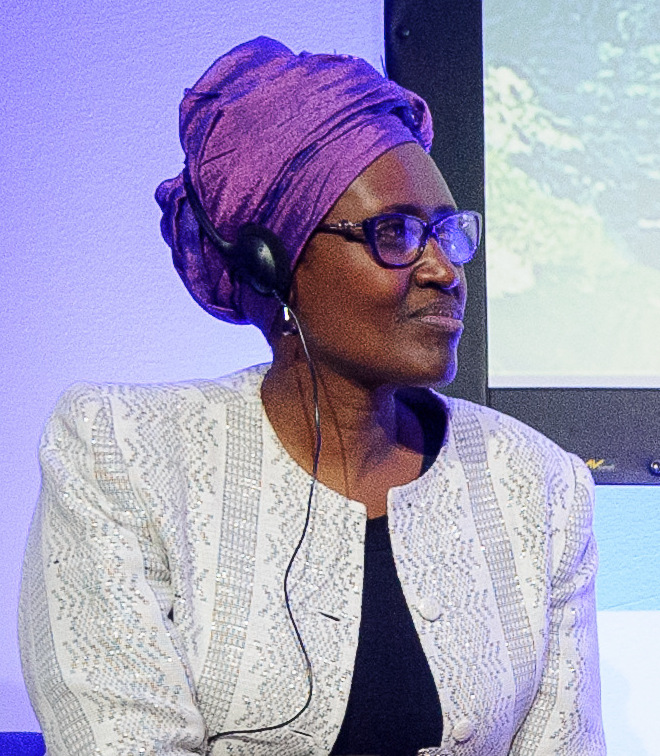
Winnie Byanyima

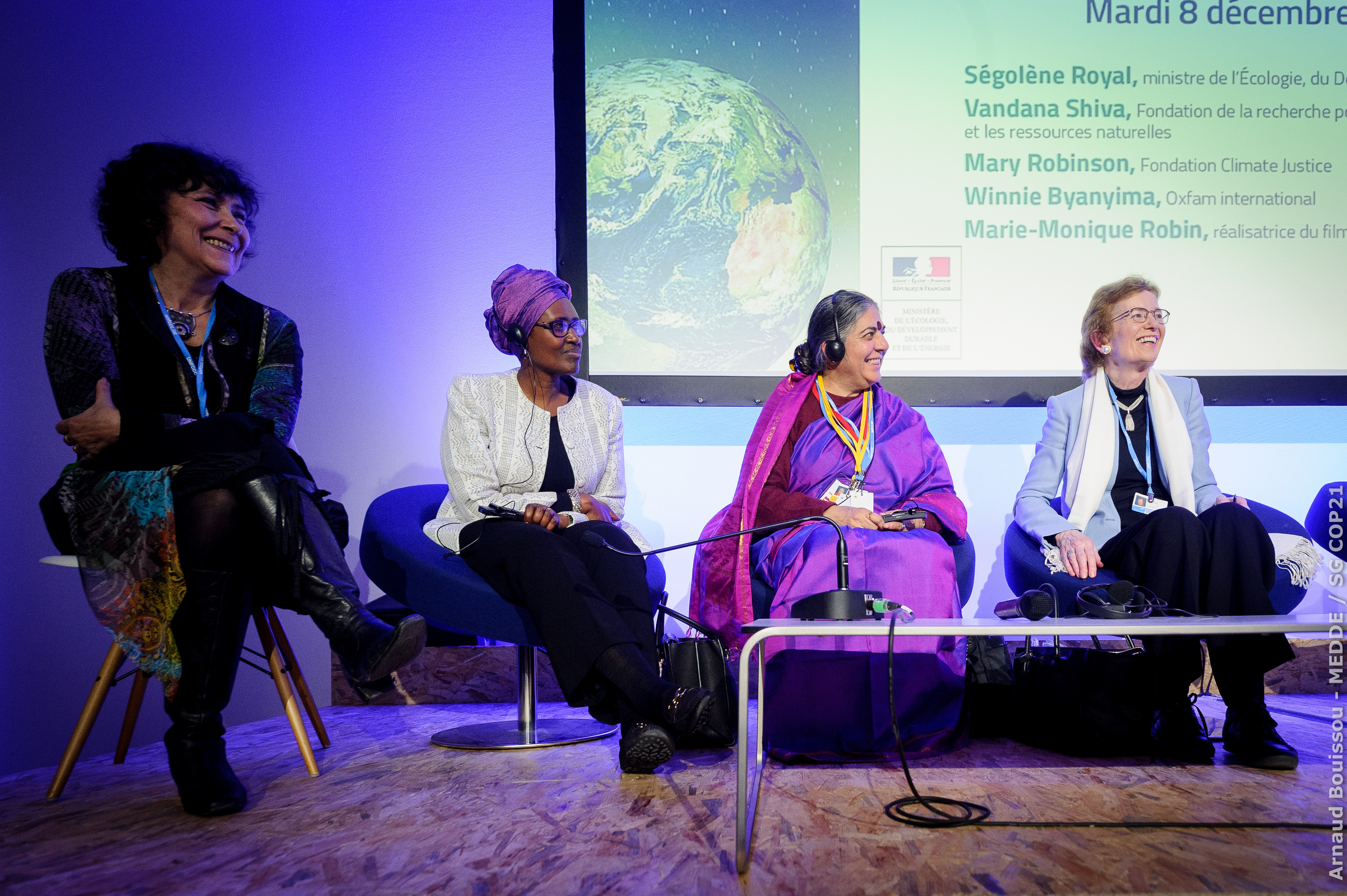
Winnie Byanyima at the Conference

Winifred Byanyima (born 13 January 1959) is the executive director of UNAIDS (2019 to present). She is a Ugandan aeronautical engineer, politician, human rights activist, feminist, and diplomat.

She was previously the executive director of Oxfam International (2013–19) and the director of the Gender Team in the Bureau for Development Policy at the United Nations Development Programme (UNDP) from 2006.

== Background ==
Byanyima was born in Mbarara District in the Western Region of Uganda, a British protectorate at the time. Her parents are the late Boniface Byanyima, one-time national chairman of the Democratic Party in Uganda, and the late Gertrude Byanyima, a former schoolteacher who died in November 2008. Winnie Byanyima attended Mount Saint Mary's College Namagunga in Mukono District. She went on to obtain a bachelor's degree in aeronautical engineering from the University of Manchester, becoming the first female Ugandan to become an aeronautical engineer. She later received a master's degree in mechanical engineering, specializing in energy conservation from Cranfield University.

== Professional career ==
Following her training as an aeronautical engineer, Byanyima worked as a flight engineer for Uganda Airlines. When Yoweri Museveni, President of Uganda since 1986, started the 1981–1986 Ugandan Bush War, Byanyima left her job and joined the armed rebellion. Museveni and Byanyima had been raised together at the Byanyima household as children, with the Byanyima family paying for all of Museveni's education and scholastic needs.

Museveni, Byanyima, and her husband Kizza Besigye were combatants in the National Resistance Army (NRA) during that war. Both Byanyima and her husband have since fallen out with President Museveni because of his repressive undemocratic rule despite his earlier stated convictions.

After the NRA won that war, Byanyima served as Uganda's ambassador to France from 1989 until 1994. She then returned home and became an active participant in Ugandan politics. She served as a member of the Constituent Assembly that drafted the 1995 Ugandan Constitution. She then served two consecutive terms as a member of parliament, representing Mbarara Municipality from 1994 until 2004. She was then appointed director of the Directorate of Women, Gender and Development at the headquarters of the African Union in Addis Ababa, Ethiopia. She served in that capacity until she was appointed director of the Gender Team in the Bureau for Development Policy at UNDP in November 2006.

=== Executive Director of Oxfam, 2013–2019 ===
In January 2013, Byanyima was announced as the next executive director of Oxfam International, replacing Jeremy Hobbs. Byanyima began her five-year directorship at Oxfam on 1 May 2013. In December 2017, she announced acceptance of an offer from Oxfam's Board of Supervisors to serve a second five-year term as Oxfam International's Executive Director.

In 2013, Byanyima was the keynote speaker at the Ugandan North American Association (UNAA) convention in Dallas, Texas.

In January 2015, Byanyima co-chaired the World Economic Forum in Davos. She used the forum to press for action to narrow the gap between rich and poor. The charity's research claims that the share of the world's wealth owned by the richest 1 percent of the world population had increased to nearly 50 percent in 2014, whereas 99 percent shares the other half. Oxfam's figures are strongly contested by several economists.

In November 2016, Byanyima was appointed by United Nations Secretary-General Ban Ki-moon to the High-Level Panel on Access to Medicines, co-chaired by Ruth Dreifuss, former President of Switzerland, and Festus Mogae, former President of Botswana.

=== Executive Director of UNAIDS since 2019 ===
Byanyima was appointed as the executive director of UNAIDS in August 2019, by the United Nations Secretary-General, António Guterres, following a comprehensive selection process that involved a search committee constituted by members of the UNAIDS Programme Coordinating Board. In her new position she concurrently serves as a United Nations Under-Secretary-General.

In addition to her role at UNAIDS, Byanyima also serves a two-year term as a member of the World Bank Group’s (WBG) Advisory Council on Gender and Development. Since 2022, she has been a member of the Commission for Universal Health convened by Chatham House and co-chaired by Helen Clark and Jakaya Kikwete.

At the recent 2024 International AIDS Conference in Munich she urged Gilead Sciences to allow Lenacapavir to be generically licensed to the UN-backed Medicines Patent Pool (MPP) so that cheaper generic versions could be sold in low- and middle-income countries. Gilead Sciences already licenses Bictegravir, another HIV drug, to the MPP.

== Other activities ==
- Virchow Prize for Global Health, Member of the Prize Committee (2022–present)
- Global Fund to Fight AIDS, Tuberculosis and Malaria, Member of the Board
- Equality Now, Member of the Advisory Board
- International Gender Champions (IGC), Member

== Personal life ==
On 7 July 1999, Byanyima married Kizza Besigye in Nsambya, Kampala. Besigye is the former chairman of the Forum for Democratic Change (FDC) political party in Uganda. They are the parents of one son named Anselm. Byanyima is a member of the FDC, although she has significantly reduced her participation in Ugandan politics since she became a Ugandan diplomat in 2004. She has five siblings: Edith, Anthony, Martha, Abraham, and Olivia. She is a practicing Roman Catholic.
