= Kiga people =

Bantu ethnic group

Bakiga
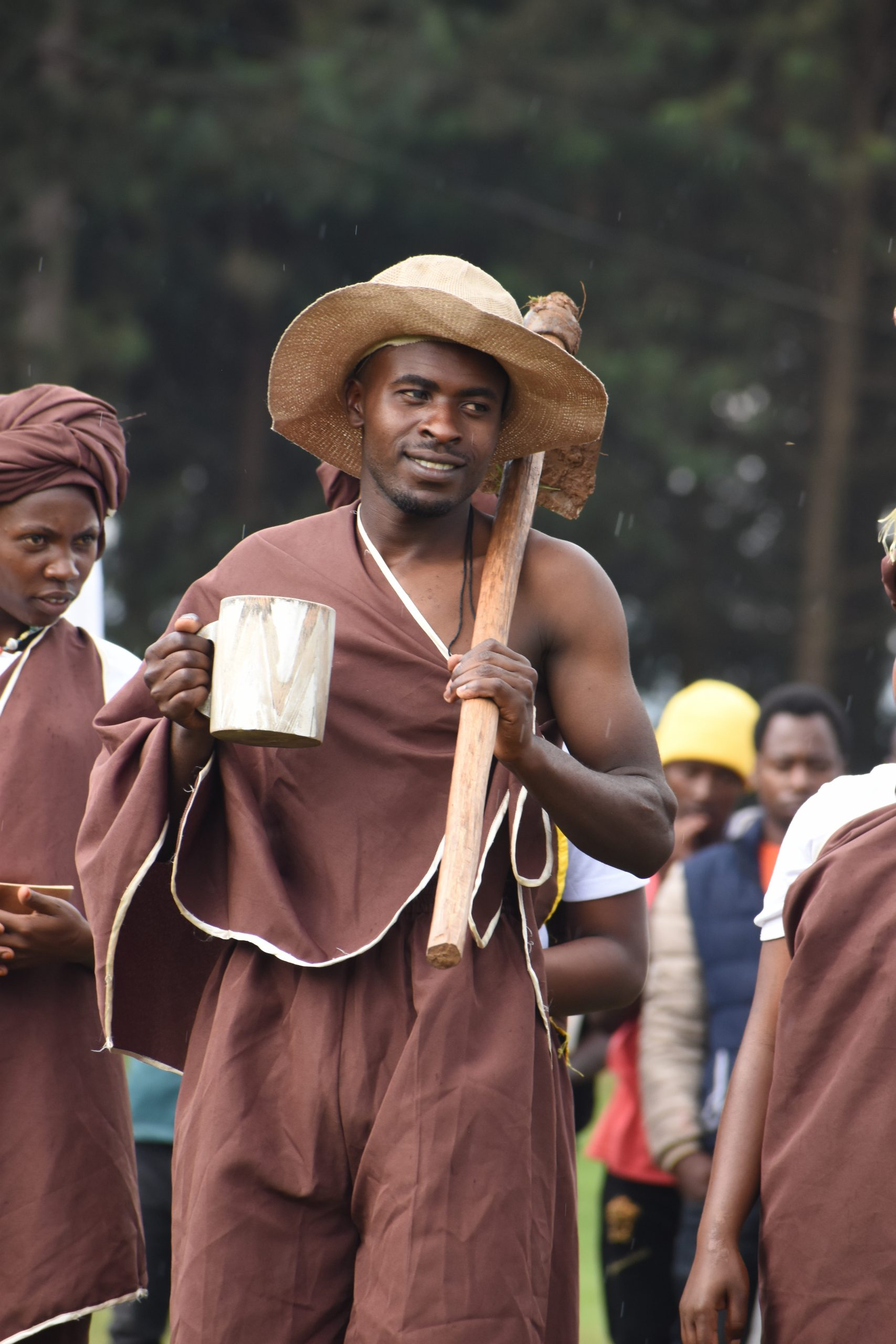
- A Mukiga man

Total population
- 2,390,446

Regions with significant populations
- Uganda

Languages
- Rukiga, English

Religion
- Christianity and Kiga Religion

Related ethnic groups
- other Rutara people (Banyankole, Bafumbira, Banyarwanda, Batooro, Bahema, Baruuli, Bwisi, Bahaya and Banyambo)

- Person: OmuKiga
- People: AbaKiga
- Language: OruKiga
- Country: BuKiga

Kiga people, or Abakiga ("people of the mountains"), are a Bantu ethnic group native to south western Uganda and northern Rwanda.

== History ==
=== Origins ===
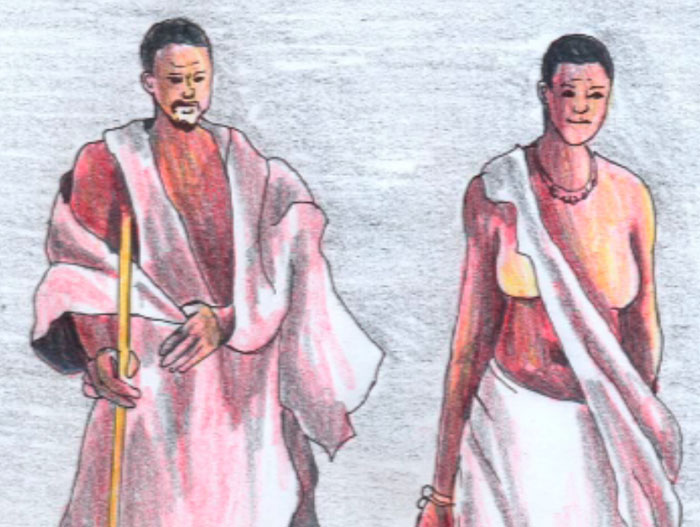
Bakiga man & woman

The Kiga people trace their origins to Rwanda. This migration is preserved in one of their traditional folk songs: Abakiga twena tukaruga Rwanda, omu Byumba na Ruhenjere ("All of us Bakiga, we came from Rwanda, from Byumba and Ruhenjere"). Both Byumba and Ruhengeri (referred to as "Ruhenjere" in the folk song) are locations in present-day Rwanda. According to oral tradition, the Bakiga are descendants of Kashyiga, later called Kakiga, who was the son of Mbogo from the ancient Bumbogo kingdom of Rwanda. He migrated to what is now southwestern Uganda, establishing the community of Bakiga in the Kigezi (Kigyezi) region.

Prior to the 18th century, historical evidence suggests Rwanda was primarily inhabited by the Twa, who were later joined by the Hutu and subsequently the Tutsi. Rwanda during this period was one of numerous small states and chiefdoms led by a ruler called Umuhinza or Umwami depending on the region. Among the Bakiga, the ruling figure adopted the title Omukama.

In early Bakiga society, Mukama was strictly a title for chiefs. Over time, it evolved into a personal name given to children of the ruling Bamuhutu clan, particularly those from the Mungura/Mwitira lineage. In contemporary times, following the spread of Christianity, Mukama has become associated with God, leading people to adopt derivative names such as Byamukama, Kyomukama, Womukama, Kamukama, and Bainomukama.

=== Historical affiliation with Rwanda ===
The early Rwandan state comprised three major regions: Bumbogo, Buriza, and Rukoma (names that persist today in central Rwanda near Kigali), each governed by clan chiefs. According to traditional accounts, the first Mwami was Mbogo of Bumbogo, who belonged to the royal Abungura clan (also known as Abahitira).

Historical narratives describe how Mbogo was displaced by Kirima (Cyirima) of the Abanyiginya clan, who criticized Mbogo's leadership and promised better governance. Despite not being from the royal lineage, Cyirima effectively took control, though he could not formally claim the title of Umwami. His reign, while relatively prosperous, was disrupted by the first invasion of the Banyoro under Cwa I, son of Nyabwongo (speculatively connected to Labongo, first Babiito king of Bunyoro-Kitara).

According to oral tradition, Mbogo grew old in age and did not want to fight Kirima. His son Kashyiga (Kakiga) fled to the north with the royal drum Kamuhagama, intending to regroup so he could return and fight. The departure of Kakiga was a devastating blow to the state of Bumbogo as he never returned, thus allowing Kirima and his sympathizers to take over the kingdom. However, since Kakiga fled with the royal drum Kamuhagama, Kirima could never legitimately claim the title of King.

In Rwandan historiography, Kirima is known as Cyirima I Rugwe. Modern scholars challenge the traditional view that his successor, Kigeri I Mukobanya, was his biological son, suggesting instead that Mukobanya was the son of the Bugesera king (of the Abahondogo clan) whose pregnant wife was taken by Cyirima. Mukobanya emerged as a formidable military leader who expanded Rwanda's territories, incorporating Buriza and Rukoma, and successfully repelled Banyoro forces. His military prowess earned him popular recognition as king despite questions about his lineage.

Following Mukobanya's reign, Rwanda experienced increasing centralization and territorial expansion reaching Lake Kivu. This growth occurred through military conquests and population migrations, through which Rwandan agricultural practices and social structures spread into new territories. The kingdom established warrior camps along vulnerable borders and forcibly annexed neighboring states like Gisela, Bugesera, and parts of Burundi.

During this period of consolidation, social stratification between Hutus and Tutsis became more pronounced. The Tutsi minority gradually dominated the political hierarchy, while the Mwami was venerated as a semi-divine figure responsible for national prosperity. The sacred drum Kalinga became the symbol of royal authority, sometimes adorned with the genitals of defeated enemies as symbols of dominance. Though Hutus initially held noble status and made up 82–85% of the population, they were increasingly relegated to peasant status as political power centralized under Tutsi control. By the 19th century, Tutsis monopolized military power while Hutus maintained influence through spiritual authority.

The Tutsi monarchy's stability was undermined by German and later Belgian colonization. It was ultimately abolished by Grégoire Kayibanda shortly before Rwanda's independence. Kayibanda's MDR-Parmehutu (Mouvement Démocratique Republicain Parmehutu; French for "Parmehutu Democratic Republican Movement") party overthrew Mwami Kigeri V in 1961, establishing Hutu governance. After independence in July 1962, Kayibanda became Rwanda's first president, with his party winning all parliamentary seats in 1963.

In July 1973, Major General Juvénal Habyarimana overthrew Kayibanda and dissolved the Parmehutu party. Habyarimana, a Hutu from the Abungura (Abahitira) clan, was reportedly the son of a Mukiga who had returned to Rwanda, settling in the northwest where Habyarimana was born. Habyarimana's death in 1994, when his aircraft was shot down near the presidential palace, remains controversial. The French crew aboard led to accusations against current president Paul Kagame as being responsible for the attack. Kagame, a Tutsi who was raised in Uganda, belongs to the Abega clan, which historically provided many queen mothers during the Abanyiginya dynasty.

=== Bakiga in Southwestern Uganda ===
According to tradition, Kakiga established the Kiga Kingdom in southwestern Uganda, organizing its clan structure and totemic system. Each clan was assigned a totem animal that members were forbidden to hunt or eat; for example, the Ba-Mungwe clan members could not hunt cape bushbuck. This practice helped prevent competition for food resources among clans. Major historical clans include the Ba-Mungura (royal clan), Ba-Musigi (royal defenders), Ba-Mungwe, Ba-Kinyagiro, Ba-Mugiri, Ba-Muhutu, Ba-Mugera, Ba-Mugyesera, and Ba-Mugyeyo, each with its own sub-clans.

Governance operated through the Abukuru b'ekika, a council of elders chosen by each clan to establish rules and administer justice. Serious disputes involving multiple clans were heard in public assemblies presided over by an Omukuru, a respected elder known for wisdom and fairness in applying traditional customs.

After leaving Bugombo, Kakiga settled in the forests of Kagarama in the mountainous region along the present Rwanda-Uganda border in Kigezi. Finding fertile land and excellent pastures for cattle, Kakiga and his followers established a new community, becoming known as Abakiga or Bakiga, despite his original intention to eventually return to fight the Banyoro invaders.

As the population grew, Kakiga sought to expand his territory by sending expeditionary groups in different directions. The first group, composed of Abasigi warriors under Rwandeme's leadership, moved eastward toward Karweru to confront Ankore forces. According to legend, this mission ended in failure when Rwandeme lost the royal drum, which is a significant cultural and political symbol. Disgraced, Rwandeme remained in the Karweru mountains where his people intermarried with Ankore communities. This dispersion explains both the presence of Abasigi throughout the region and the variation in accents, intonations, and spellings in the Rukiga language.

Kakiga introduced distinctive cultural practices, reportedly instituting mandatory circumcision for all male children in the Mungura clan, traditionally performed in a boy's eleventh year. Some accounts suggest this practice was established out of anger toward his father Mbogo. Until recently, the Abungura remained the only Kiga clan requiring circumcision, though today many Bakiga parents choose circumcision for health reasons regardless of clan affiliation. Kakiga also established the traditional Kiga naming system, wherein individuals typically took their family name from their grandfather or deceased father. This practice has made lineage tracking challenging but continues among some clans — for instance, Mbogo might be the son of Rwambogo, while several generations later, Mubangizi might be the son of Mubanga. Contemporary educated Bakiga, particularly Christians, increasingly adopt theophoric names like Ainemukama ("God is with him/her") and Ayebare ("Praise be to God").

Despite his ambitions, Kakiga never consolidated a powerful kingdom due to limited public trust and military strength. After losing the royal drum, he dispatched another group, composed of Abaromba and Abahimba, to expand northward. These people spread throughout Muko, Rubanda, and Kihihi regions. Other groups migrated to Kakore, Mparo, Nyakishenyi, and Nyarushanje. These dispersions explain the mixture of Ankore and Kinyarwanda linguistic influences in these areas. Kakiga prohibited his children from marrying outsiders to preserve what he considered the pure Bakiga lineage.

Kakiga crafted shields from cattle hide and enjoyed wrestling, dancing, hunting, and cattle keeping. Prominent figures in the Bungura royal lineage include Muhanga (Mubanga), Rwabutare, Kamboji, Kabogo, Katumba, Katamujuna, Kahigyi, Bakunzi, Mbogo, Rwakasole, Mungura, and Rwambogo. Though few in number today, the Abungura remain the recognized royal clan of the Bakiga, with many living near Kabale Town where they maintain their inherited wealth.

In contemporary Uganda, the Bakiga are known for their resilience and energy. Education is highly valued, and the community has one of Uganda's higher literacy rates. Young people often stereotypically joke about Bakiga being "arrogant" and "aggressive", based on their directness valued in their culture.

Bakiga history includes diverse interactions with neighboring kingdoms, religions, and cultures. Known for their hospitality, they speak Rukiga, a language influenced by Rwandan, Ankore, Toro, Bufumbira, and Swahili linguistic elements.

Before the introduction of Islam and Christianity, the Bakiga practiced a monotheistic faith centered on Ruhanga, a creator deity conceptualized as neither male nor female. This supreme being was also known by various attribute-based names: Mukama (supreme elder and universal ruler), Kazooba-Nyamuhanga (associated with the sun's power), and Biheeko (the one who makes things grow).

While modern Bakiga are often classified as Hutu, they historically considered themselves a distinct ethnic group. In contemporary Rwanda, southern Rwandan Hutus are called Banyanduga, while northern Rwandan Hutus are collectively referred to as Bakiga.

=== Colonial period ===
When European colonization began, many Bakiga still resided in Rwanda. The modern Rwanda-Uganda boundary was established through an Anglo-German agreement signed in Brussels on May 14, 1910, which modified the border initially set at one degree south latitude by the 1890 treaty. This agreement altered the sectors between the Congo tripoint and the junction of the Kakitumba and Kagera rivers (forming the present Rwanda-Uganda border), as well as between this junction and the second crossing of the one degree south parallel by the Kagera (forming the western Tanzania-Uganda border). Final delimitation details were formalized in an Anglo-German Protocol signed at Kamwezi on October 30, 1911, which specifically documented the Rwanda-Uganda boundary between the Congo tripoint of Sabinio and the southwestern branch Lubirizi of the Tshinzinga (Muvogero) river. Through this precise border demarcation, many Bakiga automatically became Ugandan citizens.

Unlike neighboring hierarchical societies, the Bakiga maintained a relatively egalitarian social structure without centralized kingship, organizing themselves through clan networks, lineages, and households.

Bakiga communities fiercely defended their autonomy until the combined forces of German colonial authorities and the Rwandan Mwami's royal troops finally incorporated the region into the Rwandan colonial state at the turn of the 20th century. Despite this incorporation, the area continued as a center of resistance against central authority. The anti-centralist Nyabingi cult became one of the most significant influences on Bakiga identity during this period.

Following the 1895 death of Rwandan King Kigeri IV Rwabugiri, one of his wives, Muhumuza, fled to the Kiga highlands and launched an anti-colonial rebellion in 1911. Though she was captured that same year, her resistance was continued by Ndungutse, widely believed to be her son with Rwabugiri. Although Ndungutse was reportedly killed, intermittent rebellions persisted until Belgian administration replaced German rule after World War I. These uprisings were largely motivated by resistance to the forced labor tribute system (ubareetwa) imposed on the Bakiga by colonial authorities. As anthropologist P.T.W. Baxter observed: "The proud boast of the Kiga is that they were never, as a people, subjugated by either Tutsi or Hima." Paradoxically, much of this resistance was led or inspired by disenfranchised members of the Tutsi elite.

The Bakiga eventually emerged as one of two major forces, alongside the grassroots tensions between Hutu peasants and Tutsi chiefs, that shaped Rwanda's "Social Revolution" of 1959. In pre-colonial structures, land use was controlled by chiefs who either owned land outright (bakonde) or managed access rights (bagererwa). Colonial rule technically replaced these chiefs with southern Tutsi and cooperative Bakiga administrators, but the traditional order was never fully dismantled. While older bakonde longed to restore their former status, younger bakonde generations successfully integrated their claims into the broader anti-colonial and anti-Tutsi revolutionary movement.

== Modern life ==
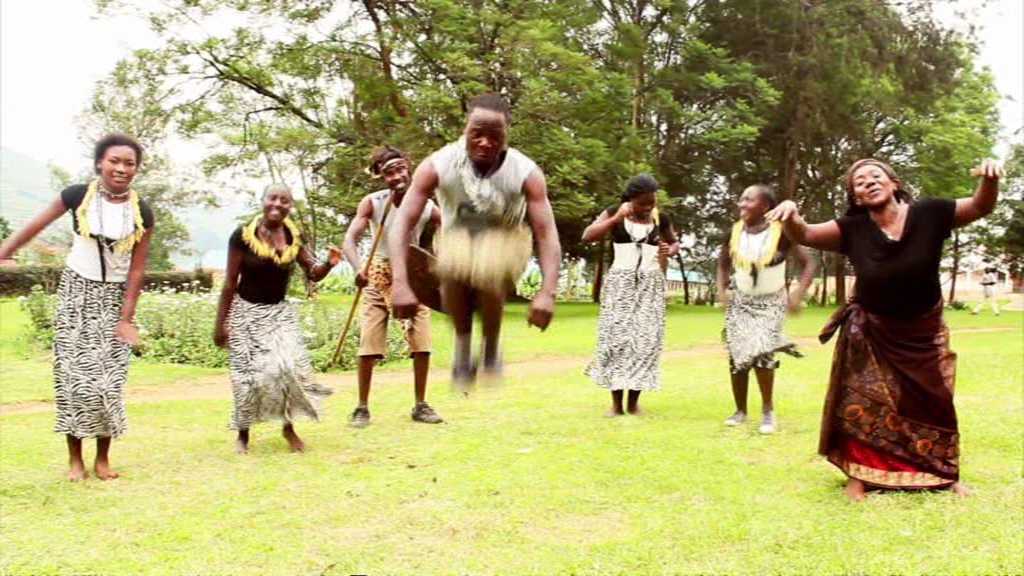
Bakiga dance

When British colonists arrived in present-day Kabale in 1908, they encountered a society of farmers and hunters living without centralized authority, a deliberate choice that distinguished them from neighboring Rwandan groups. The region was marked by frequent clan conflicts, raids, and had recently suffered from epidemics, famines, and locust invasions. The Europeans applied the concept of a unified "tribe" to these diverse clan groups, though this categorization had little foundation as the Bakiga comprised numerous distinct clan communities.

Though the ruling Abahitira clan existed (and continues today after the collapse of the Abungura), these groups functioned independently without political unification. Their language represented a dialectical blend of Runyankore, Kinyarwanda, Kihororo, and elements of Kihaya. The term "Bakiga" derives from Kinyarwanda meaning "Highlanders," initially used primarily by the Abungura royal clan but later adopted by outsiders to describe the entire population. While rarely used as a self-identifier in earlier periods, this designation gradually entered local consciousness, and today is widely embraced as "people of the hills." Unlike other major tribal groups in the region, the Bakiga did not originate as a single distinct tribe.

The Bakiga are known for their industriousness and warrior ethos. This martial nature made it difficult for colonists to penetrate their culture. When colonial powers arrived in Kigezi, they struggled to exert influence as the Bakiga had not yet consolidated into a unified kingdom structure.

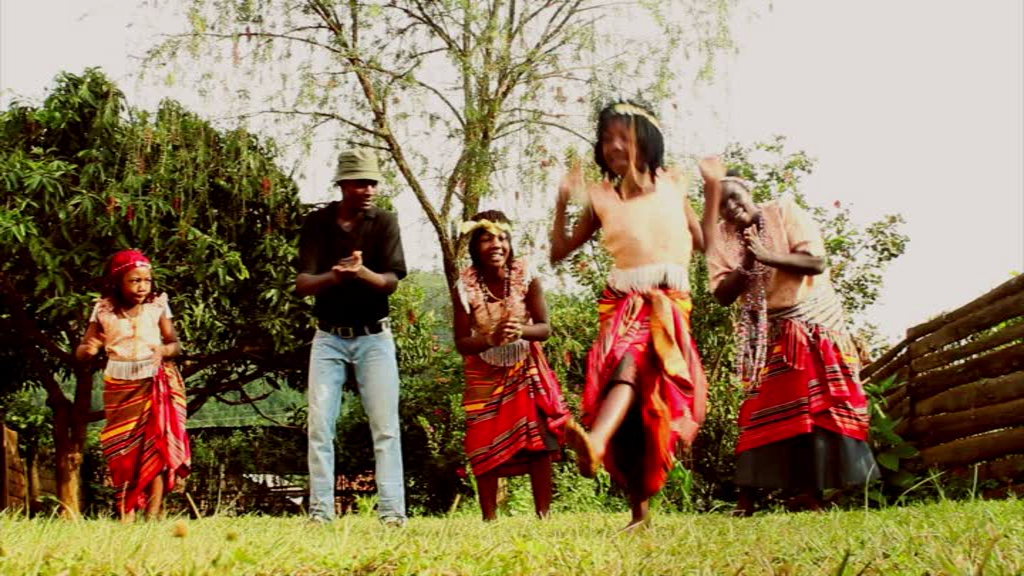

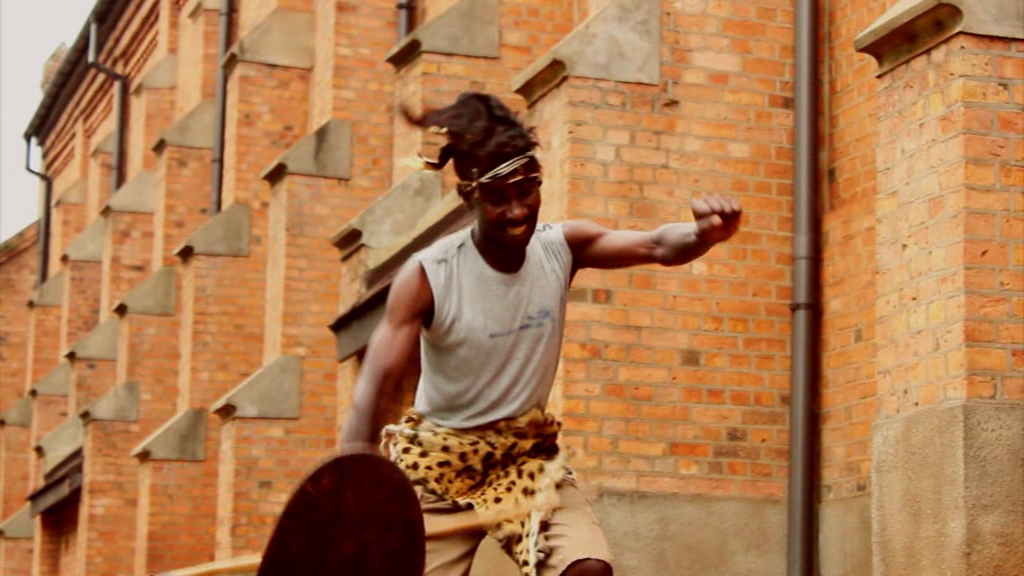
Bakiga Traditional Dance (top) and Muikiga Man(bottom).

As sporadic attempts of Bakiga's violent resistance to foreign rule often organized around religious cults, traditional spiritual practices were largely driven underground to appease colonial administrators. Indigenous people initially associated Christianity with colonialism, believing converts would "lose their reasoning capacity and become idiots." Many felt compelled to either reject both Christianity and colonialism or accept both together.

Four decades after Uganda's independence, the profound impact of European influences on Bakiga society is apparent. Today, the Bakiga are predominantly Christian (with a small Muslim minority) and sharply divided between Catholic and Protestant communities. Religious affiliation can determine professional opportunities and heavily influences local political elections.

The Bakiga have a strong enthusiasm for development and innovation. Historically, they admired aspects of colonial European lifestyles, and European-style homes and imported goods are highly valued. As in much of Uganda, personal appearance is highly valued culturally, with "looking smart" being a priority for those who can afford it.

Among older generations, elaborate traditional Bakiga weddings were increasingly replaced by Western-style ceremonies for those with financial means — featuring borrowed formal clothes, imported music equipment, and generators to power these events. Recently, however, many young people have begun returning to cultural traditions, with traditional wedding ceremonies becoming more common. These events feature Kikiga-Kinyakore attire and customary ceremonial practices.

Bakiga also maintain strong community solidarity, particularly among youth, regardless of where they reside.

At district council meetings, English is commonly used despite all participants being Bakiga, a pattern seen elsewhere in Uganda. Parents proficient in English sometimes prefer speaking it with their children, as English fluency signifies education and success.

Festo Karwemera, a Kabale elder, observes: "Accepting the culture of the West is a result of the inferiority complex due to ignorance emanating from the fact that they are the ones introducing civilisation in this land and we tend to assume that everything they do is the best. Their way of living is clean and attractive hence positive because nobody takes trouble to find out how best we can modernise our culture in our own way."

== Notable people ==
Notable people of Kiga origin include:

- Kwatsi Alibaruho, the first African-American Flight Director for the National Aeronautics and Space Administration.
- David Bahati, Ugandan Politician, MP for Ndorwa East, who proposed legislation that would have Ugandans of non-heterosexual orientation, as well as those who fail to report them to the authorities, hanged.
- Henry Banyenzaki, Ugandan politician, MP for Rubanda West and Minister for Economic Monitoring.
- Mondo Kagonyera, Ugandan politician, veterinarian, academic, and university administrator. Former chancellor of Makerere University.
- Anne Kansiime, Ugandan comedienne, actress, and entertainer
- George Kanyeihamba, former justice of the Supreme Court of Uganda
- Festo Kivengere, former Anglican bishop and critic of dictator Idi Amin's regime. His tomb at St Peter's cathedral, Rugarama in Kabale District is revered by many Anglican Kiga people.
- Brian Mushana Kwesiga, entrepreneur, engineer, and former president and CEO, Ugandan North American Association (UNAA)
- Amama Mbabazi, former Ugandan prime minister and current secretary general of the ruling National Resistance Movement party, formerly Security Minister and State Minister for Defence.
- Hope Mwesigye, Ugandan politician, former Ugandan minister of agriculture.
- Ruhakana Rugunda, former Ugandan Permanent Representative to the United Nations and first Ugandan Chairman of the UN Security Council, former minister of health, currently prime minister.
- Rutamirika, former Ugandan actor, playwright, producer and singer-songwriter
- Emmanuel Tumusiime-Mutebile, economist and banker, former governor of the Central Bank of Uganda

== Relevant literature ==
- Rutanga, Murindwa and Fr Vincent Kanyonza. 2021. Epistemology and Politics in Proverbial Names in the Pre-Colonial Great Lakes Region. Francis B. Nyamnjoh, Patrick Nwosu, Hassan M. Yosimbom, eds. Being and Becoming African as a Permanent Work in Progress: Inspiration from Chinua Achebe's Proverbs pp. 379–412. Langaa Research and Publishing Common Initiative Group.
