= Biito clan =

Clan in the African Great Lakes region

The Biito (pl. Babiito) are a major clan within the African Great Lakes region. They are of partial Luo origin, and migrated to Bunyoro and Tooro in the 16th century. The Biito dynasty replaced the Chwezi dynasty of Kitara, and founded Bunyoro-Kitara, its successor.

== Etymology ==
When the Luo diviner Nyakoka fled Kitara and returned to northern Uganda, he encountered Kyomya's son, Rukidi Mpuga, resting under a Bito tree, which is where the Bito clan gets its name from (although it is unknown what species of tree a bito tree was).

== Overview ==
Unlike all other Banyoro clans, the Biito clan is the only clan in Bunyoro that does not practice Exogamy.

== Origins ==
According to Banyoro oral history, Prince Isimbwa, the son of the Chwezi king Izaza, enjoyed hunting and would take his son Kyomya along with him. While on an expedition across the Nile into Madi and Luo territory (an area that the Nyoro call "Bukidi"), he left Kyamya behind while he returned south to Kitara. Years later, in Kitara, the Bachwezi were witnessing bad omens around them. Wamara's cattle produced blood instead of milk and Mugenyis beloved cow Bihogo died at a salt-lick. Mugenyi swore to commit suicide if his most prized cow died and nearly did take his own life but was stopped by his brothers. Rebellions within Kitara and invasions from foreign kingdoms were also occurring during these times.

King Wamara called forth his Haruspex diviners who brought a bull calf that had been fattened. Wamara rinsed his mouth with milk and poured the milk into the calf's mouth, after which it was slaughtered. After they cut into the calf's body (to examine its entrails), they found no entrails in its body. They attempted this numerous times with the results being the same. A Luo diviner named Nyakoka claimed he could solve and explain the enigma. Nyakoka struck the calf's head and legs, with the missing entrails falling out, and black smut from the fire falling on them as they fell. Nyakoka claimed that the calf's body empty of its entrails was a sign that the reign of the Bachwezi dynasty was over, with Kitara being left without rulers. The entrails being found within its legs and head meant that the Bachwezi would continue to be revered in the Mbandwa spirit medium cult (a form of Ancestor Veneration which included many Bachwezi hero-gods). The black smut was a sign that Kitara would be taken over by dark-skinned strangers from another land. Nyakoka's prophecy angered the Bachwezi, and they attempted to kill him, but he managed to escape out of Kitara and back into Bukidi north of the Nile after being warned by Mugenyi.

When Nyakoka returned to northern Uganda, he met Rukidi Mpuga, the son of the Chwezi Kyomya, and encouraged him to go south and take over Kitara, which was declining under the Bachwezi Dynasty. When the Babiito arrived at the former Cwezi capital they seemed strange and uncouth to the inhabitants. Rukidi grew up as a huntsman and thus knew nothing of courtly manners and of political diplomacy and so had to be instructed in these matters. The Babiito knew nothing of cattle and Rukidi was said to be disgusted by the mire which the cattle made in his enclosure, and he only learned to drink milk after having been persuaded to take some unknowingly as a medicine. But gradually he assumed the values and manners appropriate to his new status. Soon after he arrived, a messenger was sent to collect the regalia left behind by the Bacwezi. These included two drums, named Nyalebe and Kajumba. The messenger was able to carry only one drum, Nyalebe, but when he reached the capital, he was shocked to discover that the other drum followed him of its own accord, having rolled all the way by itself. This was regarded as a good omen for the new ruler. During Rukidi's formal accession ceremony, he beat the great drum Nyalebe and it made a loud noise and did not split or remain silent.

== Luo influence ==
The first Bito King Rukidi and his brothers took the totem (Muziro) of the clan of their Luo mother, Nyatworo, which was the bushbuck (Ngabi) because their Chwezi father, Kyomya, abandoned them when they were infants. Today, the aristocratic lineages of the Acholi people to the north still have the bushbuck as their totem, like the Babito clan of Bunyoro.

The first Babito kings made sure that succession to the throne was restricted to sons born to them by their Luo wives. This gave the Paluo (Luo speakers in northern Bunyoro) major political influence in Bunyoro-Kitara. It was Oyo Nyimba, Rukidi's son born by Nyatworo of the Luo clan of Kwonga, who succeeded him. Nyimba, in turn, made sure that it was Waswinyi, born by a Luo woman, who became king after him. The practice of restricting succession to children born by Luo women went uninterrupted, and thus, all the kings of Bunyoro-Kitara were born by Luo women until 1733.

In the Acholi language, the term "Bito" is used "generally of the sons of an aristocratic lineage". The Empaako praise names that every Munyoro is given after birth are still found in Acholi, where they are called "Pak," meaning 'praise.' Many of the mpako names are also of Luo origin. Although many Bito personal names are Luo, Bunyoro's political terminology features only two words of Luo origin, "ekikali" ("royal courtyard" found also in the kingdom of Ankole and Rwanda) and "dyangi". Some of the objects which make up the regalia of the Nyoro kings can be identified with artifacts of Nilotic origin. The Nyoro word "Mugole" (wife) is a Nilotic loanword that can be found in the Acholi "Nya gol" (wife) and beyond that to the Dinka-Nuer word "Gol" (clan, family). It can be found as far south as Rwanda, where Mugole/Mugore simply means "woman" in Kinyarwanda. The Nyoro word, "wakonga" (pangolin) is related to the Acholi "Okong" and Dinka "Akuong". the Nyoro "Mukago" ("blood-brotherhood" - which is initiated by cutting the hands) is related to Shilluk "Kago" and Dinka "Kak" (cut open).
