= Empire of Kitara =

Legendary empire in the African Great Lakes region

Empire of Kitara Kitara kya Nyamenge (Nyoro) (Note: lit. 'Kitara of Nyamenge')
- Approximate extent of Kitara under Wamara per D. H. Apuuli: Legendary extent (according to some Banyoro oral traditions but contradicted by those of other groups) Probable extent (according to archaeological evidence)
- Capital: Per legends: Somewhere near Bukuumi Mission, Kibaale District (during Isaza's reign); Kisengwe, Kibaale District (during Bukuku's reign); Mubende (during Ndahura's reign); Bigo bya Mugenyi; or Bwera, Sembabule District (during Wamara's reign)
- Common languages: Proto-North Rutara
- Religion: Belief in Ruhanga; Other traditional African religions
- Demonyms: Munyakitara (pl. Banyakitara); Mukitara (pl. Bakitara); (Kitaran)

Establishment
  - Tembuzi dynasty: c. 1000 – c. 1200 (according to C. A. Buchanan); c. 1000/1100 – c. 1300 (according to J. P. Gorju)
  - Chwezi dynasty: c. 1200 – c. 1400 (according to C. A. Buchanan); c. 1350 – c. 1400 (according to E. I. Steinhart); c. 1300 – c. 1500 (according to D. K. Jordan); c. 1300 – c. mid/late 1600s (according to J. P. Gorju); c. 1300 – c. 1400 (according to K.W.)
Preceded by
Urewe
Succeeded by
Bunyoro
Buganda
Nkore
- Today part of: Uganda, Democratic Republic of the Congo, Tanzania, and Rwanda

A map of various pre-colonial African states from different periods, including Kitara, but with a bias towards West and North Africa.

Kitara (Note: Nyoro pronunciation: [kitâɾa]; Tooro pronunciation: [kitáɾa]; Nyankole pronunciation: [citaɾa]) (sometimes spelt as Kittara or Kitwara, also known as the Chwezi Empire) was an ancient (Note: Ancient as a time period is relative, and differs among regions. Sources that refer to Kitara as ancient:) legendary state that covered significant parts of western Uganda and is regularly mentioned in the oral traditions of the Banyoro, Batooro, and Banyankole.

== Legends ==
Many accounts of the history of Kitara exist, and some may vary and/or contradict each other. Note that accounts agree more on the details of the Chwezi dynasty than the earlier Tembuzi dynasty.

=== Tembuzi dynasty ===
Ruth Alice Fisher wrote that Kakama Twale became the first king of Kitara as willed by Ruhanga. K. W. (standing for Kabalega and Winyi) and John W. Nyakatura wrote that Kintu was the first king, and consider Kakama (lit. 'little king') and Twale (Itwale in K. W.'s account) to be separate. In their accounts, Kintu was succeeded by Kakama, who was succeeded by (I)twale. John Roscoe and Petero Bikunya only mention "Twale" and "Twari" respectively.

Nyakatura then mentions that Twale's son, Hangi, succeeded him. Roscoe mentions Hangi and Nyamenge being the king after Hangi, although he wrote that there is no more information available about them. In Nyakatura's account, Hangi has two children: Ira lya Hangi (lit. 'long ago of Hangi') and Kazooba ka Hangi (lit. 'little sun of Hangi'). Julien Gorju states that Ira and Kazooba were direct sons of Ruhanga, as Hangi was the Nyoro name for Ruhanga. Nyakatura states that Kazooba succeeded Ira after he died without an heir. Roscoe states that Kabangera succeeded Ira, but there is no more information about him, although some timelines consider Kazooba and Kabangera to be the same person.

In Nyakatura's account, there was a notable population increase during Kazooba's reign, and he was loved by his subjects so much that he was deified after his death and succession by Nyamuhanga. Under Nyamuhanga, there was also an increase in population and he was deified after his death and succession by Nkya I (lit. 'lucky', as Nyamuhanga had trouble having a child). Due to the similarities between Kazooba and Nyamuhanga, Gorju analyses them as the same person. Nyakatura writes that Nkya I was succeeded by Nkya II, and Nkya II was succeeded by Baba (lit. 'father'). Gorju analyses Nkya I and Nkya II as the same person, as both of their fathers were barren. Fisher writes that Baba succeeded Kakama, but Roscoe implies that Baba succeeded Kabangera. Carole Ann Buchanan states that Baba was said to be wealthy, having many people and goats, and Fisher states that this prosperity was shared with the ever-increasing populace.

Nyakatura and K.W. write that Baba was succeeded by, in chronological order, Kamuli, Nseka (lit. 'way of laughing'), Kudidi (who reigned for longer than usual), Ntonzi (who put down rebellions, lit. 'wooden sticks'), Nyakahongerwa (lit. 'that which is sacrificed for someone') and Mukonko (who also reigned for longer than usual).All other accounts mentioned beforehand state that Baba was succeeded directly by Mukonko. Regardless, all accounts agree that Mukonko was succeeded by Ngonzaki (Note: rarely spelt Ngonzaaki to be consistent with Runyoro-Rutooro orthography) (lit. 'what do I want?', as he was very wealthy) Rutahinduka (lit. 'he who does not turn around'). K.W. states that Ngonzaki was succeeded by Isaza Mukama, then Isaza Nyakikooto, but all other accounts consider Isaza Mukama and Isaza Nyakikooto to be the same person. As a young monarch, he favored fellow young people over older people, banishing his old counselors and replacing them with young ones. However, after he nearly suffocated to death, he restored the elders' positions, as they were able to save him.

After Isaza's imprisonment in the underworld, his deputy Bukuku proclaimed himself king, as Isaza did not yet have any sons. However, Bukuku was a commoner (Iru or omwiru), and the people did not like being ruled by one. Thus, the chiefs of most of the counties rebelled against him. Fisher and Dunbar state that Bukuku had to retreat to the south-west of Kitara and Bikunya states that Bukuku only ruled over Kikwenusi, Kisegwe and Kijagarazi, although the location of said places are unknown. All accounts state that Bukuku was killed by his grandson, Karubumbi, (Note: also spelt Karabimbi (Fisher), Kyarubimba (Nyakatura), Kyarubumbi (Buchanan)) over a dispute about watering some cattle, then he proclaimed himself king, thus founding the Chwezi dynasty. Fisher and Dunbar wrote that the people were overjoyed as he resembled his paternal grandfather, Isaza.

=== Chwezi dynasty ===
Due to the rebellious chiefs refusing to submit to Karubumbi, he led a series of campaigns to regain the lands of Isaza. Fisher wrote that his first campaign was against Ntale (chief of Ankole), causing him to surrender, but Nyakatura, Buchanan, and Bikunya wrote that his first campaign was against Nsinga, chief of Bugoma. However, all of these accounts agree that Nsinga was executed after being accused of witchcraft. Places that Karubumbi was said to have annexed include Buruli, Karagwe, Sukuma, Rwanda, Busoga, Ankole, Tooro, Bunyara, Busongora, Bulega, Bukidi, Buganda, and Madi, although accounts often disagree on the chronology of these campaigns and expeditions. Fisher and Dunbar wrote that out of praise, Isimbwa, Karubumbi's father, announced that Karubumbi will be henceforth known as Ndahura (lit. 'I will care for').

Accounts agree that one day, Ndahura disappeared and did not return home, however the reason for this is disputed. Fisher and Dunbar wrote that while Ndahura was waiting for Wamara, his son, to return from an expedition, Ndahura was swallowed up by the earth and stayed to the underworld with his servant for two days. Nyakatura, Buchanan and Apuuli wrote that during a campaign in Ihangiro against Bwirebutakya (lit. 'the day does not dawn'), Ndahura was captured as "darkness fell upon Ndahura's army", and K. W. and Albert B. Lloyd wrote that Ndahura was killed in said campaign. Unlike other authors, K. W., John Beattie, Nyakatura and Dunbar wrote that Mulindwa ruled as a deputy/regent during this time. Wamara then became the next king of Kitara. Nyakatura wrote that Wamara was chosen to succeed Ndahura after some deliberation, Dunbar wrote that Ndahura appointed Mulindwa yet Wamara seized the throne, and Fisher wrote that Ndahura reluctantly allowed Wamara to reign.

The Bachwezi were said to have been skilled blacksmiths (blacksmith kings are a common trope in the ethnogenesis of many Bantu societies).

The Chwezi, especially Wamara, generally lost the respect of the people as Wamara's rule was malicious and tensions rose among themselves (e.g. Nyangoma's (Note: also spelt Nyangoro (Fisher and Dunbar)) attempted murder of Mugenyi, Ndahura's half brother). Misango, (Note: also spelt Misinga (Nyakatura)) from the south, was said to have raided Chwezi cattle with his army, but was later killed. Fisher wrote that Mugasa, Wamara's uncle and chief of the Sese Islands, rebelled against him, although the uprising was quickly squashed. Fisher and Dunbar then wrote that Bihogo, Mugenyi's rare ox which gave fragrance to whatever water she drank, had a fit and died, and that Wamara ordered witch doctors to dissect her. Nyakatura, Beattie, Apuuli wrote that Wamara, troubled by misfortunes, summoned his witch doctors to explain the meaning of them, who then slaughtered some bull calves for divination. Nevertheless, accounts agree that the cattle's body was empty and had no organs, and the witch doctors were surprised.

There happened to be two Luo brothers, Nyakoka (Note: also spelt Nyakoko (Fisher and Dunbar)) and Karango, who came from north of the nile in Bukidi, and Nyakoka said that he would solve the mystery if he entered into a blood pact with one of the Chwezi. Nyakoka made a blood pact with either Mulindwa (according to Nyakatura, Beattie and Apuuli) or Mugenyi (according to Fisher and Dunbar). He then split the head and hooves with a hatchet, all the internal organs fell out, and an irremovable black smut settled on those organs. Nyakoka is said to have explained that the empty body signified the end of Chwezi rule, the organs being in unusual places signified that the Chwezi will pack up their belongings and move elsewhere, the organs in the head specifically signified that they will still rule through the "spirit mediumship" cult and the unremovable black smut signified that the country would be ruled by foreigners with darker skin. The Chwezi were disappointed by this interpretation, and would have killed Nyakoka if he was not told of this beforehand by his blood brother and escaped. They eventually decided to abandon Kitara.

Due to the Hamitic hypothesis (which claims that all sophisticated societies in Africa are due to Caucasian invaders conquering local African populations and introducing civilization), it has been assumed without evidence that the Bahima (called Bahuma in Kitara) were Bachwezi solely due to their physical appearance. Kitara oral tradition distinguishes the Bachwezi from the Bahuma (the Bachwezi were said to have Bahuma servants) and the Bahuma themselves do not claim any genealogical connection to the Bachwezi. The Bahuma lacked major political importance and have never been kings in Kitara, as the Tutsi and Hima have in other Great Lakes kingdoms to the south. Historians have all concluded that the Bachwezi were a local Bantu aristocracy.

=== Biito dynasty ===
Nyakoka then went back to Bukidi to inform the sons of Kyomya (some of Isimbwa's grandsons, later called the Biito) that they should succeed Wamara due to Kitara's situation. Nyakatura additionally mentions Kanyabugoma (a messenger sent by the Chwezi) and Mugungu arriving after Nyakoka to relay the same information. Eventually, they all went on a journey to Kitara, where Isingoma Labongo Rukidi became the first Babiito king.

In the Acholi language, the term "Bito" is used "generally of the sons of an aristocratic lineage". The Empaako praise names that every Munyoro is given after birth are still found in Acholi, where they are called "Pak", meaning 'praise'. Many of the mpako names are also of Luo origin. Some of the objects which make up the regalia of the Nyoro kings can be identified with artefacts of Nilotic origin.

== Administrative divisions ==
Isaza was said to be the first king to divide Kitara into counties (amasaza, sing. isaza) and according to folk etymology, the word isaza was derived from his name. In the following tables, chiefs in bold and light red rebelled against Bukuku according to Bikunya and Heremenzilda K. Karubanga. These tables are not exhaustive.

County	Chief				
County	under Isaza/Bukuku	under Ndahura/Mulindwa		under Wamara	
County	under Isaza/Bukuku	per Nyakatura	per Karubanga	per Nyakatura	per Chrétien (Note: Chrétien uses Haya sources instead of Nyoro sources.)
Kitara proper (corresponds to Kyegegwa District)	**Nyamenge**	Ibona	Mugarra	Ibona	—N/a
Kaaro-Karungi / Nkore	**Machumulinda**	Wamara	Mugenyi	Katuku (Note: also spelt Katukwe (Apuuli) or Katukura (Nyakatura & Brian Taylor))	
Bwera (Mawogola County)	Mukwiri	Wamara	Mugenyi	Ibona	—N/a
Busongora (eastern part of Kasese District)	**Koogere**	Kahuka	Kazooba	Kahuka	Rubanga
Tooro	—N/a	Kahuka	Kazooba	Kahuka	—N/a
Mwenge	**Nyakirembeka** (Note: also spelt Nyakirembeke (Bikunya & K.W.))	Mugenyi	Mugarra	Mugenyi	—N/a
Busoga	**Ntembe**	—N/a	Muzinga	—N/a	Ntembe
Bugahya (north-eastern part of Hoima District)	**Nyamurwana** (Note: also spelt Nyamirwana (Bikunya))	Kiro	Kahuka of Misinga (Note: also spelt Muzinga (Taylor))	Kyomya	—N/a
Bugungu (corresponds to Buliisa District)	Kwamango (Note: also spelt Ichwamango (K.W.))	Kiro	Kahuka of Misinga	Kahuka of Misinga (Note: also spelt Muzinga (Taylor))	—N/a
Chope (north-eastern part of Kiryandongo District)	**Kaparo** (Note: also spelt Kapere (Bikunya))	Kiro	Kahuka of Misinga	Kiro	—N/a
Buruuli (corresponds to Nakasongola District)	**Nyangoma**	Rubanga		Rubago	—N/a
Busindi / Masindi	Nyakadogi	—N/a	Kapimpina	—N/a	—N/a
Bugoma (south-western part of Hoima district)	**Nsinga**	Kanyabugoma of Nsinga	—N/a	Kanyabugoma of Nsinga	—N/a
Ssese Islands	—N/a	Mugasa (Note: also spelt Mugassa (Karubanga) or Mugasha (Chrétien))			—N/a
Bulega (eastern part of Ituri Province)	**Kalega**	Mulindwa	Kiro	Mulindwa	—N/a
Buyaga / Bunyara (in Kayunga district)	Nyakaranda	Mugarra (Note: also spelt Mugarura (Chrétien))	Mulindwa	Mugarra	—N/a
Muhwahwa (corresponds to central Buganda)	**Ntege of Koya (Note: According to Nyakatura, Muhwahwa was originally given to Koya but due to his old age, Koya delegated his chiefhood to Ntege, his son.)**	Kyomya (earlier), Rusirri (Note: also named Ruganda (Karubanga) or Kaganda (Nyakatura); Nyakatura states a pluralized form of this as being the origin of the name 'Buganda'.) (later)	Kyomya	Rusirri	Ishabwana
Bwiru / Buddu	**Katani of Msinga**	Wamara	Kagora	—N/a	

under Isaza/Bukuku		under Ndahura/Mulindwa		under Wamara			
under Isaza/Bukuku		per Karubanga		per Nyakatura		per Chrétien	
County	Chief	County	Chief	County	Chief	County	Chief
Bugangaizi (eastern part of Kibaale District)	**Kabara**	Buvuma Island	Mbubi	Rwanda	Ibona	Mpororo	Mibali
Ganyi / Acholi	**Ganyi**	Ssingo (Kyankwanzi, Kiboga, Kassanda and Mityana Districts)	Wamara	—N/a		Kyamutwara (Bukoba Rural and Bukoba Urban Districts)	Kashare
Madi	**Ganyi**	Butuku (in Ntoroko District)	Ibona	—N/a		Kiziba (south-eastern part of Missenyi District)	Bike
Masaka	**Nyaba**	—N/a		—N/a		Karagwe (Karagwe and Kyerwa Districts)	Nono
—N/a		—N/a		—N/a		Ihangiro (southern part of Muleba District)	Nkumbya
—N/a		—N/a		—N/a		Buzinza	Nshanshama

== Modern studies ==
=== Extent ===
M. S. M. Kiwanuka suggests that the extent of Kitara implied by writers like Roland Oliver, Merrick Posnansky, and A. R. Dunbar have been influenced by nationalism:

Hitherto, conclusions reached by writers such as those cited above on the history of the Empire of Bunyoro-Kitara, have been based largely on the traditions of Bunyoro, which besides being never subjected to any critical examination, are unfortunately coloured by nationalist sentiments.

He also points out the lack of evidence for these claims:

The civilization of the Bachwezi and their political influence is still asserted to have extended even to areas where there is no memory of the Bachwezi or their cults. Maps have been drawn to show the vastness of the Empire but no one for instance has asked when Bunyoro extended her influence to Equatoria.

=== Organization ===
John E. G. Sutton writes that according to archaeological evidence, some earthwork sites said to be in Kitara can be interpreted as separate capitals:

There is in fact a reasonable case for interpreting each of the big earthwork sites — Kibengo, Munsa and Bigo — as a capital for those who controlled the grasslands of those districts. In this way Kitara can perhaps be still imagined not as a single united kingdom but as a vaguer system of political organization and economic exploitation of this region some six or seven centuries ago.

Godfrey N. Uzoigwe calls Kitara "loosely-organized":

These traditions inform us in masterful and amazing detail – in spite of several lacunae – how their ancestors founded the first state system in the lake region and later converted it into a large, albeit loosely-organized ‘empire,’ that extended beyond the region. That ‘empire’ they called Kitara Kya Nyameng[e], an ‘empire’ won by the sword by larger-than-life individuals.

== Legacy ==
Legends of Kitara were often used to give legitimacy to later dynasties and kingdoms in and around Uganda, especially Bunyoro, which claimed to be the direct heirs of Kitara. Linant Pasha wrote that Muteesa I of Buganda claimed to be the only true descendant of the princes of Kitara.

== See also ==
- African historiography
- History of Uganda
- List of kingdoms and empires in African history
