= Hima people =

Hima
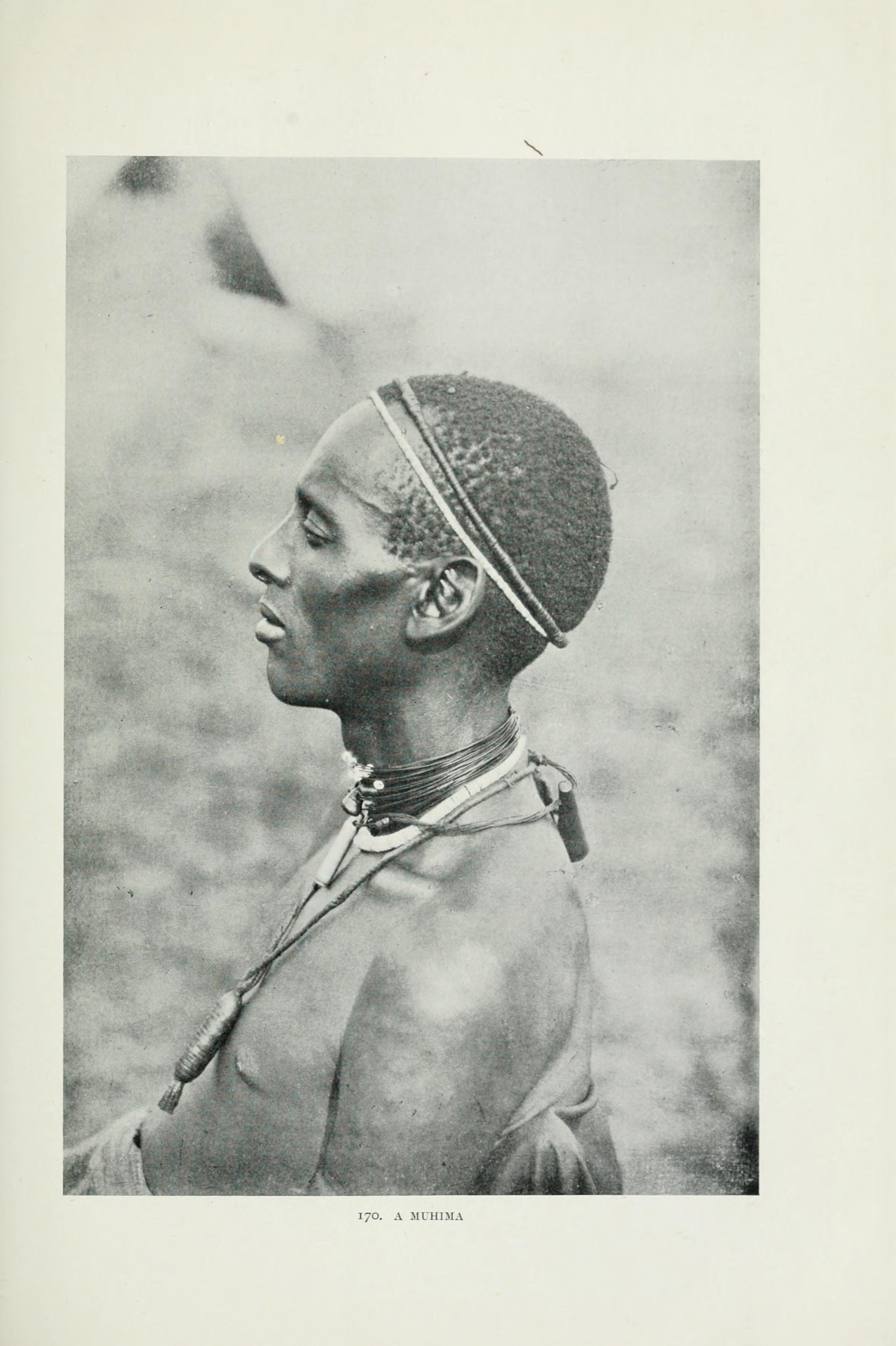

Regions with significant populations
- Uganda and Tanzania

Languages
- Rutara languages

Religion
- Predominantly: Christianity; Traditionally: Belief in Ruhanga

Related ethnic groups
- Other Rutara people and Tutsi

- Person: MuHima, MuHema, or MuHuma
- People: BaHima, BaHema, or BaHuma

The Hima, Hema or Huma are a pastoralist social class that is native to the grasslands of Western Uganda and Karagwe, Tanzania.

== Etymology ==
Birgitta Farelius claims that the term "Hima" probably derives from the Bantu word for monkey (nkɪ́mà), which is a totem animal of some clans originating from Karagwe and Ankole.

The name "Bahuma" comes from the verb "okuhuma", which means the "cacophony of sound made by a herd of cattle on the move, lowing, thudding of hooves, and cries of herdsmen".

== Genetics ==
According to data from 1969, the Hima and Tutsi groups possessed the enzyme of milk sugar lactose tolerance, which is highly prevalent in European populations, but the other Bantu-speaking tribes were largely lactose deficient, similar results and conclusions were reached by the geneticist Sarah A. Tishkoff in 2007.

Excoffier et al. (1987) claimed that the Hima and Tutsi, despite being surrounded by other Bantu speakers, are "closer genetically to Cushites and Ethiosemites".

== Physique ==
According to observers, "The typical Muhima of pure descent is tall, with well proportioned body and limbs...his nose is longer, more prominent and finer, and the lower part of their face narrower than in the average negro. Some (Hima) are lighter in colour, a dark bronze, but all have woolly hair".

The Ankole historian Samwiri Rubaraza Karugire states that "the much-publicized idea of the similar physical features of the Bahima and the Batutsi is of the very marginal relative validity since, even today, it very easy to pick out a Mututsi from any given number of Bahima and vice versa because their features and build are different."

== Culture and society ==
=== Identity ===
People are considered Hima or Iru according to which kingdoms they resided in. For example, the Bayango clan is considered Hima in the Kingdom of Karagwe, but in Ankole, they are regarded as Iru farmers.

=== Pastoralism ===
Cattle form the center of Hima society, and pastoralism is pursued over all other forms of subsistence. Hunting is looked down upon and if given no other choice the Hima only hunt animals that resemble cattle such as "Buffalo, one or two kinds of antelope, Waterbuck and Hartebeest".

Samuel Baker describes the Bahuma of Bunyoro:

There is a curious custom throughout Unyoro; a peculiar caste are cattle-keepers. These people only attend to the herds and the profession is inherited from past generations. They are called Bahooma. If the herds are carried off in battle, the Bahooma, who never carry arms, accompany them to their new masters and continue their employment. Nothing but death will separate them from their cattle.

The Bahuma loved their cattle so dearly that Gaetano Casati reports that after a Sudanese raid into Bunyoro that captured 10,000 cattle, the Bahuma preferred to serve the Sudanese as cattle keepers rather than be separated from their cows. Thus, the Bahuma willingly followed the raiders with their families.

The Runyankore language (and other Rutara languages) is filled with terms about cattle and verbs that describe the actions of people concerning cattle. Counting revolves around the experience of herding; their decimal system uses "engundi" for 10 and "igana" for 100, from a typical herd of one hundred cows. "Engundi ikumi" (ten bulls) means one thousand because ten bulls will each have a herd of one hundred cows. A herd of 100 cows (ente igana), brings a special prestige to their owner. Whenever a Muhima managed to obtain 100 cows for the first time a special ceremony was performed, indicating he had moved to a new status.

All Banyankore, not only the Bahima, treasure certain types of cattle so highly that they almost worship them. An example of one such type of cattle are those born as twins (empasha). They are rare, and when they do occur, they are appreciated so much that they can never be sold or given as bride wealth because the Banyankore believe that they are signs of fortune and wealth. Due to their symbolic value of economic wellbeing for the family, it happens that owners of empasha cows allow them to grow old, die, and be buried.

In Bahima society, Rites of passage are marked with cattle-focused ceremonies. When a boy reaches the age of four months, he is placed on a cow's back with a bow, arrow, and rope. He is said to be “put down on a cow” (okuteekwa aha nte). Symbolically, his life as a man begins as he takes up the tools of the herder and the weapon of the hunter.

The Bahima have various superstitions regarding the health of their cattle. The Bahima do not wash themselves with water due to a belief that it would bring harm to their cattle. According to the Social anthropologist James George Frazer, "Neither men nor women wash, as it is considered to be detrimental to the cattle. They therefore use a dry bath for cleansing the skin, smearing butter and a kind of red earth over the body instead of water, and, after drying the skin, they rub butter well into the flesh. Water applied by a man to his own body is said to injure his cattle and also his family."

=== Women and Marriage ===
Hima women were fed heavily on milk to gain weight as obese women were considered attractive partners among the Hima.

During marriage ceremonies, Hima couples would spit milk at each other.

=== Diet ===
The diet of the Hima is largely based on milk. The Hima drink so much milk that a significant number of children would develop "Bahima disease", which was anemia, caused by feeding children a diet strictly of milk.

The Bahima forbid the use of iron as vessels to store milk, only wooden bowls, gourds, or earthen pots. They believe the use of other kinds of vessels would harm their cattle and cause them to become ill.

== History ==
=== Origins ===
The historian Christopher Ehret believes that the Hima mainly descend from speakers of an extinct branch of South Cushitic he calls "Tale south Cushitic." The Tale southern cushites entered the Great Lakes region sometime before 800BC and were pastoralists par excellence, relying only on their livestock and conceivably growing no grains themselves; they did not even practice the hunting of wild animals, and the consumption of fish was taboo, and heavily avoided. The Tale Southern Cushitic way of life shows striking similarities to the Bahima, who exclusively rely on the milk, blood, and meat of their cattle and traditionally shun the cultivation and consumption of grains, and who look down on hunting and avoid eating fish. A number of words related to pastoralism in the Rutara languages are loanwords from south Cushitic languages, such as "cow dung" and "lion" (a livestock predator).

This late continuation of Southern Cushites as important pastoralists in the southern half of the lacustrine region raises the intriguing possibility that the latter-day Tutsi and Hima pastoralism, most significant in the southern half of the region, is rooted in the Southern Cushitic culture and so derived from the east rather than the north.

— Christopher Ehret, UNESCO General History of Africa: Africa from the Twelfth to the Sixteenth Century,

The Sog Eastern Sahelians (or Sog Eastern Sudanic) are an extinct Nilo-Saharan group that also contributes to Hima ancestry. The Sog were agro-pastoralists who entered the Great Lakes region in 2,000 BC and had an immense influence on the eastern Bantus. According to Christopher Ehret They spoke a Kir-Abbaian language which was related to Nilotic and Surmic languages (but still distinct from them). The Rutara languages spoken by the Hima have many Sog loanwords such as the word for cow (ente), showing their contribution to Hima pastoralism.

Central Sudanic peoples likely form another part of the ancestry of the Bahima. Central Sudanic farmers and herders formerly lived in the lands that the Hima reside in now, and some of their cultural practices have stayed on after their assimilation by the Bantu. For example, in Central Sudanic-speaking societies, women are kept away from cattle. Among the Bahima (and the neighboring Tutsi to the south), women are strictly forbidden to milk cows.

Bantu peoples (especially the West Nyanza-speaking Rutara people) are also a part of Hima ancestry. The languages spoken by the Hima are Bantu and their religion (Ruhanga) is also Bantu derived. Between 1000 and 1450 AD, Bantu pastoralists innovated over 19 different words for cattle colors and horn shapes, with Rutarans in particular innovated nine color terms and a noun meaning "large cow with long horns" (the Ankole cattle breed). Christopher Ehret notes that "the Tale southern cushites did not attribute any esthetic or special social valuation to cattle. Few words of the kinds indicative of a special cultural status of cattle, such as words for cattle colors or horn shapes, trace back before the last 1,000 to 1,500 years. Only the everyday breeding distinctions—such as bull, heifer, calf, and the like." proving it as an independent Bantu innovation. The Bahima are very meticulous in noting the color of each cow as well as any distinguishing features.

During the northward Rutara migrations from their homeland in the Kagera Region and into the grasslands of western Uganda in search of new pasturelands in 1200 AD; David Lee Schoenbrun says, "it is conceivable that groups of Tale Southern Cushites, Central Sudanic or Sog Eastern Sudanic-speaking herders took up Bantu speech" and moved into these grasslands alongside the Rutara speaking Bantu peoples.

According to Birgitta Farelius, the Bahima probably descend from a specific clan who monopolized the designation for “noble herder”.

=== Precolonial times ===
The Bahima have been influential and regarded as having high status in some of the African Great Lakes Kingdoms. Hima kings ruled the kingdoms of Ankole, Karagwe, and Mpororo. Although the Bahuma claimed and were accorded high status, they have always, as Bahuma, lacked major political importance, and they have never been rulers in Bunyoro-Kitara but were herdsmen who "attached themselves to the great chiefs as custodians of their herds." The Bahuma were servants for the Bachwezi rulers in the Empire of Kitara, herding and tending to their cattle.

The founder of the Kingdom of Rwanda and of its ruling Nyiginya dynasty was a Hima and not a Tutsi. He was from Uganda and his name was Ruganzu Ndori. Eventually, the Nyiginya dynasty claimed Tutsi origins for itself, increasing the prestige attached to the label as their power grew in the region.

The Hima were not always high-status people. In the Kingdom of Burundi, the Bahima were regarded as less prestigious than both the Tutsis and the Hutus. While the Ganwa dynasty of Burundi intermarried with Tutsis and Hutus, they would not take Hima spouses. Hima were considered impure and were kept far from the court and away from the kingdom's public affairs.

The Hima lived in Buganda as a kind of outcasts on the fringes of the kingdom, herding cattle owned by Ganda chiefs. Their pastoralism confers no particular symbolic advantage, since cattle have no great ritual significance in Buganda. Farmers had high status in Buganda and so the Baganda regarded (and regard) the Hima as menial people (the Bahima were frequently called slaves by the agricultural Baganda and looked down upon as being culturally inferior).

Even in Ankole, the Hinda rulers looked down on the nomadic Hima away from the court, derisively calling them uncivilized and "tick eaters".

=== Colonial era and the Hamitic hypothesis ===
During the colonial era, European explorers, anthropologists, and administrators applied the now-discredited Hamitic hypothesis to the social structure of the African Great Lakes region, including the kingdom of Ankole. This racial theory, popularized by 19th-century figures such as John Hanning Speke, posited that any advanced political organization, pastoral culture, or complex statecraft in sub-Saharan Africa was introduced by a migratory Caucasian race termed "Hamites."

In the context of southwestern Uganda, British colonial authorities and missionaries categorized the pastoralist Hima aristocracy as superior "Hamites," distinguishing them from the agriculturalist Iru population, whom they classified as indigenous "Bantu." European observers frequently attributed what they perceived as refined physical features and governance capabilities among the Hima to this supposed foreign, Middle Eastern ancestry.

This racial framing was heavily integrated into colonial administrative policies, such as the system of indirect rule, which consolidated political privilege and administrative roles within the Hima elite. Modern historians and anthropologists emphasize that the Hamitic hypothesis was a pseudoscientific construct that ignored the shared language, culture, and deep historical interdependence between the Hima and Iru, leaving a legacy of formalized stratification that persisted into the post-colonial era.
