= Kitahimbwa of Bunyoro =

Kitahimbwa (or Yosia) was born in 1869 and was Omukama of Bunyoro from 1896 to 1902 in Bunyoro, in what is now Uganda. At approximately 11 years old, Kitahimbwa was installed as a puppet monarch by the British while his father, Kabalega, was still actively fighting colonial forces in the north.

Kitahimbwa became king when his father, Kabalega of Bunyoro, was fighting the British forces north of the Victoria Nile. He ruled under the British Overseas Military Administration (BOMA).

In 1902, the British and some of his own chiefs, who found him "unruly" and incapable of managing state affairs to their satisfaction, deposed him. He was succeeded by Andereya Bisereko Duhaga II.

Preceded by Kabalega of Bunyoro	Omukama of Bunyoro; 1898–1902	Succeeded by Andereya Duhaga II of Bunyoro
