= Isingoma Labongo Rukidi =

Second born of the four first Babiito brothers

Isingoma Mpuga Rukidi

Omukama of Bunyoro
- Reign: c. 16th century
- Successor: Ochaki Rwangira
- Born: Bukidi (Northern Uganda)
- Burial: Dyangi (Note: John Nyakatura adds that Rukidi's garments were buried in Masaijagaka, Chope.)
- Spouses: Iremera; Bunono
- House: Biito dynasty
- Father: Kyomya
- Mother: Nyatworo

Isingoma Rukidi Mpuga, also called Labongo, (Note: also spelt Labong'o) was the first Biito king (Omukama Omubiito) of Bunyoro-Kitara in present-day western Uganda. In Nyoro tradition, he is considered to be the twin brother of Kato Kimera, the first king of Buganda.

== Life ==
=== Nyoro tradition ===
In Nyoro tradition, Isingoma Mpuga Rukidi was born in Bukidi as the second son of Kyomya, a member of the Chwezi dynasty, and Nyatworo, the daughter of a Lango man called Labongo, (Note: Not to be confused with Rukidi himself, who is also called Labongo in some sources.) of the Mukwonga clan. He was the younger brother of Nyarwa, the twin brother of Kato and the older brother of Kiiza. Isingoma is derived from the Nyoro phrase ise-ngoma, meaning "father (of the) drum(s)". 'Mpuga' comes from the name of a black-and-white cattle, empuuga, referencing Rukidi's mixed ancestry. The name 'Rukidi' references his birthplace.

Rukidi and his brothers (the Babiito) are said to have been hunters who were loved by the people of Bukidi. One day, a diviner called Nyakoka, (Note: also spelt Nyakoko) also from Bukidi, approached them and told them to go to Kitara, because then the country lacked a king, and they did so; Nyakoka accompanied them on the journey. During the journey, Rukidi and his entourage crossed the Nile after at least one child was sacrificed into it. When Rukidi was close enough to the capital, an interpreter (Note: Nyakatura records his name as Muhanguzi.) was sent to announce his arrival to the people of Kitara.

When Rukidi finally arrived at the capital, the local people are said to have viewed with suspicion or contempt, in part due to his noticeably mixed descent. At the palace of the last king, Wamara, Nyakoka summoned a witch-doctor named Kasoira (Note: also spelt Kasooro), whom Rukidi asked where and why the members of the Chwezi dynasty went. Kasoira said that the Chwezi disappeared towards Lake Victoria and that they departed due to the curse of Kantu. (Note: Kantu was either a friend of Wamara treated poorly by Wamara's wives (per Nyakatura) or the eldest son of Ruhanga who became the "spirit of evil" (per Fisher).) Rukidi then gave the same questions to Bunono and Iremera, Wamara's wives, and one of them (Note: Bunono (per Fisher)) gave a response very similar to Kasoira's. Rukidi dismissed Kasoira, Bunono and Iremera after they confirmed that the Chwezi would never return.

Afterwards, Nyakoka (Note: and also a man named Mugungu (per Nyakatura)) criticised Rukidi's hesitance to accept the kingship and told him to act before Kato is made king instead. This prompted him to issue instructions to prepare for a coronation, including the restoration of royal buildings and the gathering of the royal drums Nyalebe and Kajumba, spears, shields, beads and other regalia. During the coronation, the royal drums produced adequately loud sounds, proving to the people in attendance his right to rule; Rukidi was then given the royal name Winyi and the empaako Okaali.

Rukidi divided Kitara among his brothers and his followers. Busoga was given to Kiiza and Buganda was given to Kato, who soon rebelled against him, declaring himself as the King of Buganda and assuming the name of Kimera.

Rukidi later married Bunono and Iremera, the latter of which bore him two sons, Ocaki and Oyo, and caused him to both like and encourage drinking milk by offering him milk disguised as medicine one day when Rukidi was ill.

Rukidi died and was succeeded by Ocaki Rwangira.

=== Acholi tradition ===
In Acholi tradition, Labongo was a son of Olum (Note: Rennie Montague Bere wrote that Olum "[...] was probably [Labongo's] father"; earlier he recorded Awich, the Rwot of Payera, as saying "[...] it was said that the devil was [Labongo's] father.") and a brother of Gipiir and Tiful. (Note: Labongo and Gipiir are also known as Nyabongo and Nyipiir) After the death of Labongo's son, (Note: Joseph Pasquale Crazzolara wrote that it was Tiful's son who died.) Labongo and Gipiir separated, with Gipiir moving west across the Nile; Acholi and Alur people claim descent from Labongo and Gipiir respectively. In some sources, Labongo is identified as Rukidi or is said to have founded the Biito dynasty. (Note: Bere wrote that "Labongo can be identified with Isingoma Labongo Rukidi, [...] or, if a more remote connection is preferred and Isingoma Mpuga Rukidi is taken as the founder of the Babito, Labongo is accepted as the father of Isingoma's mother"; earlier he wrote that "Labongo, [...], is the same man as Isingoma Rabongo Rukidi, the first of the line of the Mukama of Bunyoro.")
