= Omukama of Bunyoro =

Title of the king of Bunyoro, Uganda

Omukama of Bunyoro-Kitara
- Omukama wa Bunyoro-Kitara
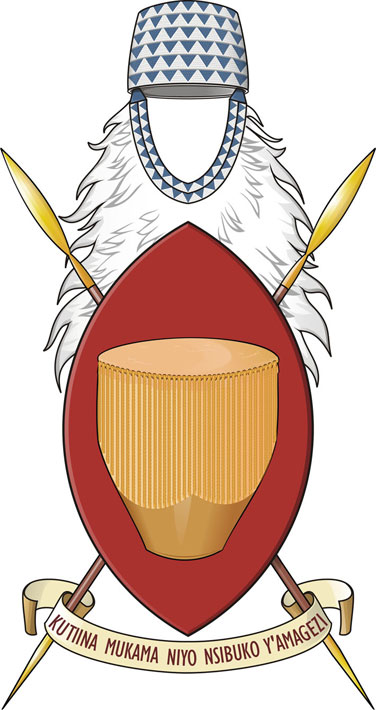
- Coat of arms of Bunyoro-Kitara

Incumbent
- Solomon Iguru I since 11 June 1994

Details
- Style: His Majesty
- First monarch: Rukidi
- Formed: 16th century
- Residences: Karuziika Palace, Masindi

Omukama wa Bunyoro (translates to the King of Bunyoro) is the title given to rulers of the East African kingdom of Bunyoro-Kitara. The kingdom lasted as an independent state from the 16th to the 19th century. The Omukama of Bunyoro remains an important figure in Ugandan politics, especially among the Banyoro people of whom he is the titular head. He is closely related to the Omukama of Tooro Kingdom.

The Royal Palace, called Ekikaali Karuziika (Karuziika Palace), is located in Hoima. The current Omukama is Rukirabasaija Solomon Iguru I Gafabusa Amooti and his wife is Omugo (the Queen) Margaret Karunga Adyeri. As a cultural head, the King is assisted by his Principal Private Secretary, a Cabinet of 21 Ministers and Orukurato (a Parliament).

== Constitutional recognition ==
In 1962, the United Kingdom granted independence to Uganda. In February 1966, Prime Minister Milton Obote suspended the constitution and seized power, abolishing all of the traditional kingdoms—including Bunyoro—in 1967. The Omukama (King) of Bunyoro-Kitara Kingdom was reinstated by Statute No. 8 of 1993, enacted by the Parliament of Uganda after the monarchy had been abolished for many years. Unlike the pre-1967 Omukama, who was both titular head and a political figure of the government of Bunyoro, the Omukama today is a cultural leader above partisan politics, although the king remains the titular head of the Bunyoro regional government.

Article 246 of the 1995 Ugandan constitution provides:

246. Institution of traditional or cultural leaders.
(1) Subject to the provisions of this Constitution, the institution of traditional leader or cultural leader may exist in any area of Uganda in accordance with the culture, customs and traditions or wishes and aspirations of the people to whom it applies.
(2) In any community, where the issue of traditional or cultural leader has not been resolved, the issue shall be resolved by the community concerned using a method prescribed by Parliament.
(3) The following provisions shall apply in relation to traditional leaders or cultural leaders—
(a) the institution of traditional leader or a cultural leader shall be a corporation sole with perpetual succession and with capacity to sue and be sued and to hold assets or properties in trust for itself and the people concerned;
(b) nothing in paragraph (a) shall be taken to prohibit a traditional leader or cultural leader from holding any asset or property acquired in a personal capacity;
(c) a traditional leader or cultural leader shall enjoy such privileges and benefits as may be conferred by the Government and local government or as that leader may be entitled to under culture, custom and tradition;
(d) subject to paragraph (c) of this clause, no person shall be compelled to pay allegiance or contribute to the cost of maintaining a traditional leader or cultural leader;
(e) a person shall not, while remaining a traditional leader or cultural leader, join or participate in partisan politics;
(f) a traditional leader or cultural leader shall not have or exercise any administrative, legislative or executive powers of Government or local government.
(4) The allegiance and privileges accorded to a traditional leader or a cultural leader by virtue of that office shall not be regarded as a discriminatory practice prohibited under article 21 of this Constitution; but any custom, practice, usage or tradition relating to a traditional leader or cultural leader which detracts from the rights of any person as guaranteed by this Constitution, shall be taken to be prohibited under that article.
(5) For the avoidance of doubt, the institution of traditional leader or cultural leader existing immediately before the coming into force of this Constitution shall be taken to exist in accordance with the provisions of this Constitution.
(6) For the purposes of this article, "traditional leader or cultural leader" means a king or similar traditional leader or cultural leader by whatever name called, who derives allegiance from the fact of birth or descent in accordance with the customs, traditions, usage or consent of the people led by that traditional or cultural leader.

== Etymology of Omukama ==
Omukama means ‘the milker’, as the leader of the kingdom provides his citizens with food and wealth. The word comes from Runyoro-Rutooro omu- (singular human-being class prefix) and -kama ‘to milk’, which ultimately comes from Proto-Bantu kám ‘squeeze, wring’.

In modern Runyoro-Rutooro, however, dropping the initial vowel of this word (mukama ‘boss, sir’) changes its meaning considerably.

== History of the Omukama of Bunyoro-Kitara dynasties ==
=== Babiito dynasty ===
The Bachwezi dynasty was followed by the Babiito dynasty of the current Omukama of Bunyoro-Kitara. Any attempt to pinpoint the dates of this, or any other dynasty before it, is pure conjecture; as there were no written records at the time. Modern day historians place the beginning of the Babiito dynasty at around the time of the invasion of Bunyoro by the Luo from the North. The first mubiito (singular) king was Isingoma Mpuga Rukidi I, whose reign is placed around the 14th century. To date, there have been a total of 27 Babiito kings of Bunyoro-Kitara.

==== List of Omukamas of the Babiito dynasty ====
- Rukidi, late fifteenth century
- Ocaki, late fifteenth/early sixteenth century
- Oyo Nyiba, early sixteenth century
- Winyi I, early sixteenth century
- Olimi I, mid sixteenth century
- Nyabongo, mid sixteenth century
- Winyi II, late sixteenth century/early seventeenth century
- Olimi II, mid seventeenth century
- Nyarwa, mid seventeenth century
- Cwamali, mid seventeenth century
- Masamba, late seventeenth century
- Anabwani I, late seventeenth century
- Kyebambe I, late seventeenth century
- Winyi III, early eighteenth century
- Nyaika, early eighteenth century
- Kyebambe II, early eighteenth century
- Olimi III, c. 1710–1731
- Duhaga, 1731–c. 1782
- Olimi IV, c. 1782–1786
- Nyamutukura Kyebambe III, 1786–1835
- Nyabongo II, 1835–1848
- Olimi V, 1848–1852
- Kyebambe IV, 1852–1869
- Kabalega, 1869–1898
- Kitahimbwa, 1898–1902
- Duhaga II, 1902–1924
- Winyi IV, 1925–1967
  - Monarchy discontinued by the Ugandan government, 1967–1994
- Solomon Iguru I, 1994–present
