= Empaako =

Naming system of Western Uganda

Empaako tradition of the Banyoro, Batooro, Batuku, Batagwenda and Banyabindi of western Uganda
- UNESCO Intangible Cultural Heritage
- Country: Uganda
- Reference: 00904
- Region: Africa

Inscription history
- Inscription: 2013 (8th session)
- List: Need of Urgent Safeguarding

Empaako (Tooro pronunciation: [empáːko], Nyoro pronunciation: [empâːko], sing.: empaako), also known as praise names or pet names, is a pet name which affirms one's social ties; it may be used as a greeting, a declaration of affection, respect, honour or love.

Empaako is a naming system practiced among the Banyoro, Batooro, Batuku, Batagwenda, and Banyabindi people of Uganda as well as the Bahema of Eastern D.R. Congo by which children are given a name. They were introduced after the Biito clan had conquered the Empire of Kitara, and are nowadays used as a respectful and endearing way to refer to someone in conversation, separate from individual given names and surnames. Empaako is included on the UNESCO list of intangible world heritage requiring emergency safeguarding.

== Empaako names ==
The empaako names are twelve in number plus one intended for kings, they are as follows:

=== Abbooki ===
Abbooki is an empaako that comes from the Luo word aboko "I have narrated".

Abbooki is a pet name given to a person who is expected to cherish the roles of parents, teachers, elders, mentors, councilors and leaders. Abbooki signifies some one who shares wisdom as passes on knowledge. It is given to both males and females.

=== Abwoli ===
Abwoli (Note: Abwoli, Adyeri and Atwoki are often spelt Abwooli, Adyeeri and Atwooki respectively due to the long vowel present in each of these empaako.) is an empaako that can be used for girls/young women in a context where it would be improper to ask for her empaako. It comes from the Luo word abwolo "I deceive", and is associated with cats.Abwoli however has to do with diplomatic relationships. The theory behind this is that "not all the truth needs to be told always, because it might cause unnecessary hurt and pain".

=== Acaali ===
Acaali is an empaako reserved for men and comes from the Luo word acalo "I look like you". It is also for small boys and chiefs. There's also a luo saying which states, "acaali embwa".

=== Acanga ===
Acanga (often spelt Acaanga, however this spelling violates the Runyoro-Rutooro orthography) is an obsolete empaako, allegedly used by chiefs, thus it is not in common use. This pet name is still under research; no better information is updated on it

=== Adyeri ===
Adyeri is an empaako that comes from the Luo word adyero "I have sacrificed". It's a unisex pet name which refers to a friendly, affectionate person with a "larger-than-life heart". It also belonged to Embandwa kaikara hence the saying "Adyeri kaikara", so whoever is named Rwakaikara or Kaikara is Adyeri.

=== Akiiki ===
Akiiki is a unisex empaako that does not have a Luo origin, although it is associated with the title "Saviour of the Nations". It's the only name with Indigenous Bunyoro- Kitara roots and it refers to one who upholds community interests with love and honesty.

=== Amooti ===
Amooti is an empaako that is generally used by the Omukama and the aristocracy, although normal people can still use this empaako. It comes from the Luo amoto "I greet". It is for both men and women, twins especially Isingoma and Nyangoma. The empaako is associated with a saying, "Eba y'Omukama rundi ya Ruhanga. Amooti also refers to some one who genuinely respects and speaks well of others

=== Apuuli ===
Apuuli is an empaako used exclusively by males, small boys and princes. It refers to some one with the ability to attract others, similar to the innocent charm of a child. It can also be used for boys/young men in a context where it would be improper to ask for his empaako.

=== Araali ===
Araali is an empaako reserved for men, and does not have a Luo origin, although it is associated with a "savior" figure, power of thunder and the god of lightning, Kagoro, has this empaako.

=== Ateenyi ===
Ateenyi is an empaako that comes from the Luo word atenyo "I have left". It is a unisex empaako which refers to some one who understands and loves a wrongdoer without condoning the wrong act. This empaako is associated with the mythical snake of the River Muzizi.

=== Atwooki ===
Atwooki is an empaako that Gerald Heusing claims comes from the Luo word adok "I go back", although this is disputed.The name Atwooki is of ugandan origin, specifically deriving from Runyoro, Rutooro and Runyakole languages spoken in Uganda, the name carries the meaning "they have increased" or "they have multiplied," reflecting themes of growth, prosperity, and abundance that are deeply valued in Bantu cultures.

=== Bbala ===
Bbala (or Abbala) is an empaako reserved for men and was originally reserved for those close to the king. It comes from the Luo word abalo "I spoil it".According to the Tooro culture, it means some one who loves other people unconditionally.

=== Okaali ===
Okaali is an empaako that is not in common use since it is only used for the Omukama (king) when he is being worshipped in rituals or in special ceremonies. In other cases, Amooti is used to refer to him, thus the Omukama is the only person in a community to have two empaako. After becoming the Omukama, he takes the empaako of Amooti and Okaali, no matter what empaako he had before. It comes from the Luo word okalo "he/she jumped over".In Tooro, Okaali, however implies some one with the highest responsibility as a leader in the Kingdom of Rukira'abasaija Agutamba Omukama

== Usage ==
Empaako are used to emphasize the social bonds existing when addressing the person. It is used to greet or show affection, respect, honor or lover. Empaako is awarded during a ceremony by the clan chief in the newborn's home. The choice of name is based on an analysis of the child's traits by his paternal aunts who look for a resemblance with other members of the family. Once the name is chosen, the clan chief attributes it to the child. After the ceremony, a meal of millet and smoked beef is shared. Presents are given to the baby and a tree is planted.

== Bibliography ==
- "The empaako tradition of the Batooro, Banyoro, Batuku, Batagwenda and Banyabindi of western Uganda". UNESCO. 2013.
- Comité intergouvernemental de l'UNESCO (2013). "Decision of the Intergovernmental Committee: 8.COM 7.A.12". Bakou.
- Robinah Birungi. "Empaako Ceremony, Origin and meaning". The Ugandan. Archived from the original on 3 August 2017.
- Godfrey Mwakikagile, « Empaako (names of endearment) », in Uganda: The Land and Its People, New Africa Press, Dar es Salaam, Tanzania, 2009, p. 62-64 ISBN 9789987930890
