= Chwezi =

Semi-legendary clan of the African Great Lakes region

The Chwezi or Cwezi were a major semi-legendary clan that formed the second ruling dynasty of the Empire of Kitara within the African Great Lakes region. They are venerated as ancestor spirits by the Rutara people.

== Scholarly studies ==
=== Origins ===
John Sutton describes the Chwezi spirits as having “a common Bantu root, suggesting that the particular spirit or the concept behind it may have a history much older than that of the kingdom and even their antecedents.” Okot P’Bitek believes that the Chwezi spirits belong to a period, before all dynasties, "when the gods roamed the earth and humans could marry them." Oral traditions say the Chwezi spirits imprinted themselves on the hills and lakes of the region.

Peter Schmidt says that worship of the Chwezi spirits goes back to the earliest iron smelters in 500BC, during the Urewe period among the Proto-Great Lakes Bantu society, and claims that the displacement of Chwezi blacksmiths from political authority in places like Buhaya may explain the determined opposition of Chwezi spirit mediums to subsequent royal dynasties and eventually to colonial powers. In oral traditions concerning the Abacwezi, they are often contrasted with later rulers, such as the Biito clan, who privileged the occupation of cattle herding and imposed new hierarchical structures in their domains, going back to the period just before the Common Era. The Chwezi spirits' links to early iron tools and anvils are also found on more recent shrines of these spirits.

=== Association of Bahima with Bachwezi ===
Due to the racist Hamitic hypothesis (which claims that all sophisticated societies in Africa are due to Caucasian invaders conquering local African populations and introducing civilization), it has been assumed without evidence that the Bahima (called Bahuma in Kitara) were Bachwezi solely due to their physical appearance. Kitara oral tradition distinguishes the Bachwezi from the Bahuma (the Bachwezi were said to have Bahuma servants) and the Bahuma themselves do not claim any genealogical connection to the Bachwezi. The Bahuma lacked major political importance and have never been kings in Kitara, as the Tutsi and Hima have in other Great Lakes kingdoms to the south. Historians have all concluded that the Bachwezi were a local Bantu aristocracy.

== Legends ==
The Chwezi dynasty was formed by an Iru (commoner) named Karubumbi. The first capital of the Bachwezi dynasty was in Mubende. The second capital was said to be located 40 miles south in Bigo bya Mugenyi.

The Bachwezi were said to have been skilled blacksmiths (blacksmith kings are a common trope in the ethnogenesis of many Bantu societies).

Among the Bachwezi, nine of them are specially well known, all of them sons or grandsons of Isimbwa (the number nine is a special number in Nyoro culture).

Members of the Chwezi clan were described as light-skinned (Lighter yellowish/reddish skintones can be found naturally within Bantu ethnic groups).

=== Origins ===
The Chwezi dynasty is traced back to Isimbwa, the son of Isaza. When Isimbwa grew up, it is said that Nyamiyonga arranged a marriage between him and a woman from the underworld called Nyabiryo, and they had a son named Kyomya. Afterwards, he left the underworld and began hunting in various places, accompanied by many other people. One day, he reached Kitara, then ruled by Bukuku.

John Nyakatura states that he and his followers paid a visit to Bukuku and gave him many gifts at his palace. Mugizi, the maid of Bukuku's daughter, saw this and told Nyinamwiru, Bukuku's daughter, how good-looking and rich they were. She told Mugizi to ask Isimbwa to pay her a visit, and he agreed, but asked her to wait for a good opportunity. He also sent her some gifts. Isimbwa and his followers then left the palace and went to Kisozi. He left all but two men there, and returned to Nyinamwiru. Ruth Alice Fisher states that Isimbwa saw a maid carrying a pitcher to a well to draw water and when he learnt that she was a maid of Nyinamwiru, he gave some flowers to the maid, telling her to tell Nyinamwiru that he sent her the flowers and will return to marry her in four days. After the maid did so, Nyinamwiru sent her to watch for Isimbwa in case he forgets to marry her. Four days later, Isimbwa returned. In any case, accounts agree that Isimbwa used a ladder to climb into Nyinamwiru's house and stayed with her for several months, then he left, promising to return soon. Afterwards, Nyinamwiru gave birth to Karubumbi.

=== Family tree ===
Chwezi family tree
Chwezi kings

Nyinamwiru	Isimbwa
Mugenyi
Katutu	Ndahura	Nyante
Mulindwa
Kiro	Wamara
Mugarra
Labongo	Nyabiryo
Ibona
Nyatworo	Kyomya
Kange	Byonyabwe
Kato Kimera	Isingoma Rukidi	Kiiza	Kagoro

Nyangoma
Nyakwahya
Koogere
Waraga
Rugonya
Nyarwa
