= Hema language =

Bantu language of DR Congo

Hema
- Oruhema
- Native to: Democratic Republic of the Congo
- Ethnicity: Hema
- Native speakers: (130,000 cited 2000)
- Language family: Niger–Congo?: Atlantic–Congo; Volta-Congo; Benue–Congo; Bantoid; Southern Bantoid; Bantu; Northeast Bantu; Great Lakes Bantu; West Nyanza; Rutara; North Rutara; Hema

Language codes
- ISO 639-3: nix
- Glottolog: hema1238
- Guthrie code: JE.121

Hema
- Person: Muhema
- People: Bahema
- Language: Oruhema

Hema is a Bantu language and one of three languages spoken by the Hema people of the Democratic Republic of the Congo.

Hema is sometimes called Southern Hema in contrast to the unrelated language Lendu, also known as Northern Hema.
