= Bahima disease =

- Specialty: Hematology/pediatrics

Bahima disease is caused by iron deficiency in babies which are fed exclusively on cow's milk. It mainly affects the Bahima people and can also result in the skull becoming misshapen and taking on an elongated, tower-like form and dilation of the diploë.
