= Bunyoro =

Bantu kingdom in western Uganda

Kingdom of Bunyoro-Kitara Obukama bwa Bunyoro-Kitara (Nyoro)
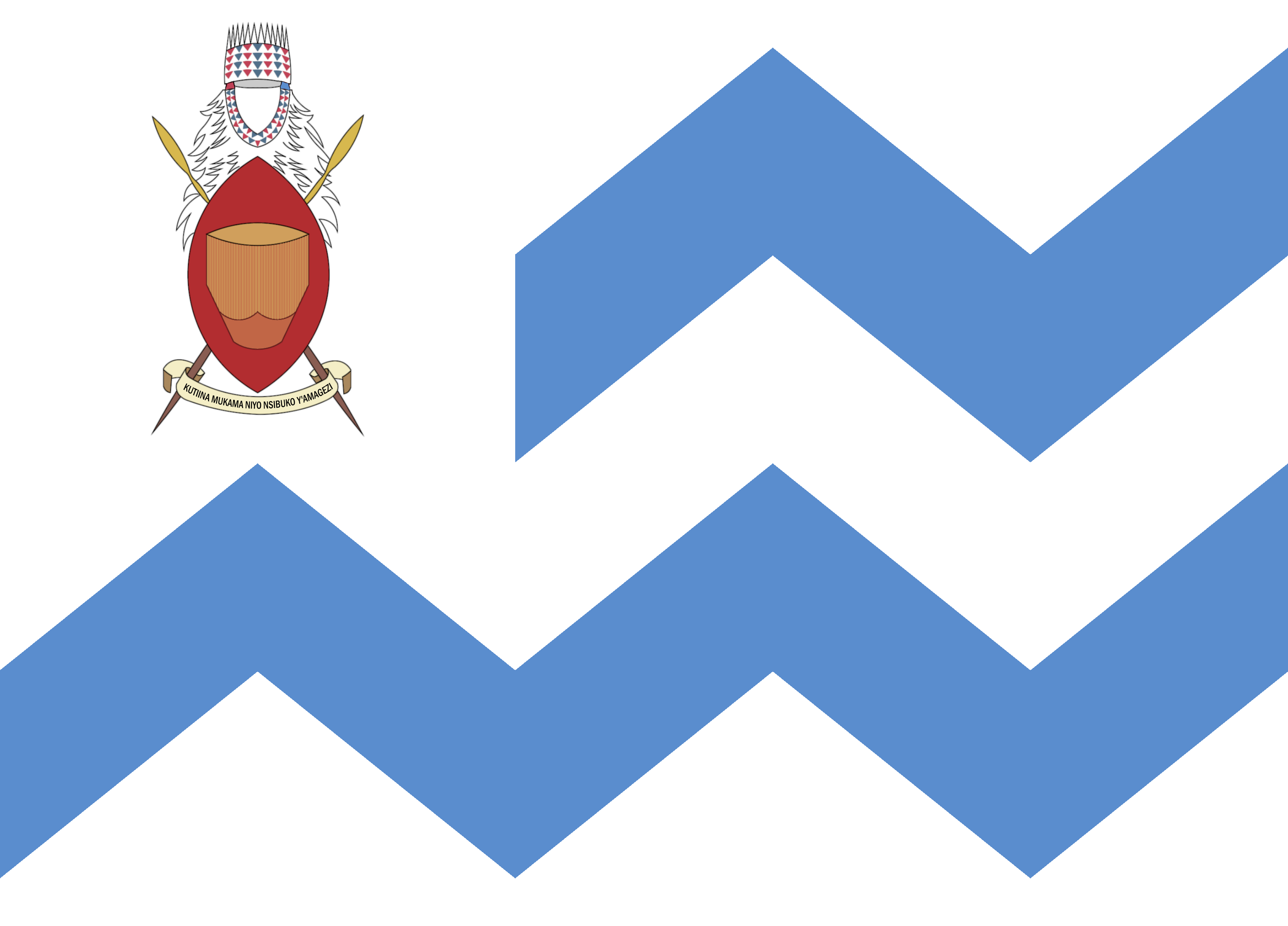
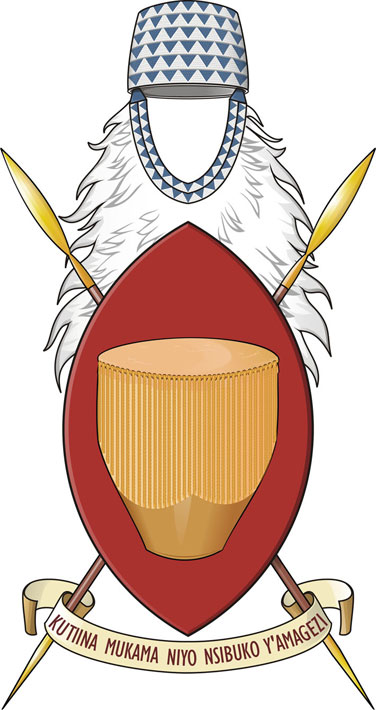
- Flag Coat of arms
- Motto: Habwa Ruhanga n'Ihanga Lyange "For God and My Country"
- Anthem: "Bunyoro-Kitara Anthem"
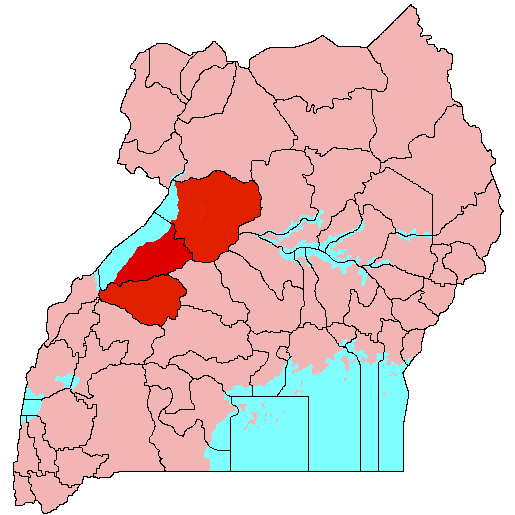
- Location of Bunyoro (red) in Uganda (pink).
- Status: Traditional kingdom
- Capital: Masindi
- Official languages: Runyoro, English
- Ethnic groups: Banyoro, Bagungu
- Demonym: Banyoro
- Government: Constitutional monarchy
  - Monarch: Solomon Iguru I
  - Prime Minister: Andrew Kirungi Byakutaga Ateenyi
- Legislature: Orukurato Orukuru
- History
  - Established by Rukidi: 16th century
  - Establishment of Protectorate of Uganda: 1894
  - Obote abolishes Uganda's traditional kingdoms: 1967
  - Monarchy restored: 1993

Area
- 17th century: 80,000 km^{2} (31,000 sq mi)
- Now: 16,114.6 km^{2} (6,221.9 sq mi)

Population
  - Estimate: 1.4 million
- Time zone: UTC+3
- Calling code: 256
Preceded by
Empire of Kitara

- Person: MuNyoro
- People: BaNyoro
- Language: RuNyoro
- Country: BuNyoro

Bunyoro, (Note: Nyoro pronunciation: [βuɲôɾo]) formally called the Kingdom of Bunyoro-Kitara, is a Bantu traditional monarchy in Western Uganda. It was one of the most powerful kingdoms in Central and East Africa from the 16th century to the 19th century. It is ruled by the King (Omukama) of Bunyoro-Kitara. The current ruler is Solomon Iguru I, the 27th Omukama.

== History ==
=== Establishment ===
The kingdom of Bunyoro was established in the late 16th century by Rukidi-Mpuga after the dissolution of the Empire of Kitara. The founders of Bunyoro-Kitara were known as the Babiito, who succeeded their Bachwezi ancestors. Rukidi Mpuga was the first king of Bunyoro. He was called "Rukidi" because despite being of Bunyoro paternal lineage, he was born in Bukidi (The Luo/Madi area of northern Uganda), and "Mpuga" means "a cow with white spots" in the Nyoro-Tooro language. He was named "Mpuga" because "one of his sides was lighter just like his Bachwezi father’s, the other darker like his Bakidi mother's," which signified his mixed ancestry. The Songa, Gahi, Ranzi, Yaga, Rungu, Gabu, and Yanga clans are held to be the oldest.

According to Banyoro and Batooro traditions, Rukidi sent his twin, Kato, to rule the southeast, however he declared independence and established the kingdom of Buganda (Bunyoro's historical rival). Another tradition says Buganda's third king, Kimera, came from Bunyoro to establish a Babiito dynasty. Baganda tradition fiercely disputes this, and says that Buganda was distinct and of at least equal antiquity to Kitara.

The Kingdom of bunyoro most likely originated in the area around Kakumiro. This area contains tombs which are said to contain the earliest kings.

=== Expansion ===
The early Biito kings surpassed the feats of their Chwezi forefathers and achieved regional pre-eminence. Recent historical studies by Jean-Pierre Chrétien, Henri Médard and Christopher Wrigley have concluded that Bunyoro during the first one or two centuries of Biito rule was the greatest power in the region. Biito princes established themselves in the kingdom of Kiziba (in northern kagera), the northern Busoga kingdoms and west of the Rwenzoris. As far away as Buzinza, kings claimed to have their origins in Bunyoro. While the vast majority of Bunyoro were Bantu-speaking, the northern and eastern regions were mostly Luo-speaking, forging cultural and linguistic connections which aided Bunyoro's expansion of influence.

=== Decline ===
Bunyoro began to decline in the late eighteenth century due to internal divisions. Buganda seized the Kooki and Buddu regions from Bunyoro at the end of the century. In the 1830s, the large province of Tooro separated, claiming much of the lucrative salt works. To the south Rwanda and Ankole were both growing rapidly, taking over some of the smaller kingdoms that had been Bunyoro's vassals.

Thus by the mid-nineteenth century Bunyoro (also known as Unyoro at the time) was a far smaller state, though it was still very wealthy due to the income generated from controlling the lucrative trade routes over Lake Victoria and linking to the coast of the Indian Ocean. In particular, Bunyoro heavily benefited from the trade in ivory. Due to the volatile nature of the ivory trade, an armed struggle developed between the Baganda and the Banyoro. As a result, the capital was moved from Masindi to the less vulnerable Mparo. Following the death of Omakuma Kyebambe III, the region experienced a period of political instability where two kings ruled in a volatile political environment.

In July 1890 an agreement was settled whereby the entire Buganda region north of Lake Victoria was given to Great Britain. In 1894 Great Britain declared the region its protectorate. In alliance with Buganda, King Omukama Kabalega of Bunyoro resisted the efforts of Great Britain, aiming to take control of the kingdom. However, in 1899 Omukama Kabalega was captured and exiled to the Seychelles, and Bunyoro was subsequently annexed to the British Empire. Because of Bunyoro's resistance to the British, a portion of the Bunyoro kingdom's territory was given to Buganda and Tooro.

The country was put under the governance of Buganda administrators. The Banyoro revolted in 1907; the revolt was put down, and relations improved somewhat. After the region remained loyal to Great Britain in World War I a new agreement was made in 1933 giving the region more autonomy. Bunyoro remains as one of the five constituent kingdoms of Uganda, along with Buganda, Busoga, Rwenzururu, and Tooro.

=== Contemporary society ===
During the first regime of Milton Obote, the Kingdom of Bunyoro initially benefited from regaining the two "lost counties" of Buyaga and Bugangaizi following a 1964 referendum. It was, however, forcefully disbanded in 1967. The kingdom, together with three others, Buganda, Busoga, Tooro, remained banned during the regime of dictator Idi Amin (1971–1979) and the second regime of Milton Obote (1980–1985) and remained banned until 1993.

In 1993 the Kingdom was re-established and in 1995 the new constitution of Uganda was made, allowing and recognizing the Kingdoms. The current Kingdom covers the districts of Buliisa District, Hoima district, Kibaale District, Kakumiro District, Kagadi District, Kiryandongo District ,Kikube District ,Hoima City and Masindi District.

== Demographics ==
According to 1997 projections, the total population of the Kingdom is between 800,000 but there may be 1,400,000 (depending on sources) living in 250,000-350,000 households. 96% of the population lives in rural areas, and only 1% of the population uses electricity for lighting and cooking. More than 92% of the population is poor, and earned less than half that of the Ugandan national average, and about 50% of the population is illiterate.

According to the 2024 Uganda Census, Bunyoro Sub-region had a population of about 2.79 million people living in 663,258 households. The average household size was 4.2 people, while children under 18 accounted for about 1.46 million people. Youth aged 15–24 numbered about 573,000, and the working-age population was approximately 1.52 million. Bunyoro had a population density of 142 people per square kilometre, with a labour-force participation rate of 48.7%. About 9.8% of people in the labour force were unemployed, while 42.6% of young people aged 15–24 were not in employment, education or training.

== Bunyoro- Kitara Kingdom Clans ==
As of 23rd September 2026, there are 46 known clans of Bunyoro-Kitara Kingdom

1. BABIITO
2. BABIITO
3. BAHINDA
4. BABYASI
5. BAHUNGA
6. BAZIRA/BAFUNJO/ BALIGIRA
7. BAHAMBA
8. BAKURUNGO
9. BAKOROGI/ BAAMI
10. BAYANJA
11. BEERI
12. BAGIMU
13. BAJANGI
14. BASEKE
15. BASIITA
16. BABUURWA
17. BACWEZI
18. BASONDE
19. BAKWONGA
20. BADWARO
21. BANAATI
22. BAYAGA
23. BASENGYA
24. BACWA
25. BARANZI
26. BANYWAGI
27. BAGABU
28. BASAMBO
29. BAHEMBA
30. BAHANGO
31. BAIRUNTU
32. BABBWORO
33. BALEBEEKI
34. BAFUMAMBOGO
35. BAKOOYO
36. BANYANA
37. BAZAAZI
38. BASONGA
39. BASINGO
40. BAYONGA
41. BABBOPI
42. BASAIGI
43. BAITIRA
44. BAGIMU
45. BASAZIMA
46. BANYONZA

== Geography ==
=== Territory and sphere of influence ===
In the Northern and eastern parts of Bunyoro, it was difficult to determine where the borders of the Bunyoro kingdom ended, and where separate (but in some degree dependent) polities began, and due to the broadening and varying shades of influence, the question might have been meaningless. Due to British colonialism, the Nile river, and not any traditional division in language, culture, or political allegiance, became the formal northern boundary of the attenuated Nyoro state.

Bunyoro's Nilotic neighbors viewed themselves and were viewed by the Banyoro, as "mother's brothers" to the Bito dynasty, rooted in the fact that Rukidi Mpuga's mother, Nyatworo, was a Nilotic Luo from Bukidi. Bunyoro's relationship with its Nilotic neighbors was not only defined by political dominance but also by kinship ties. In Nyoro culture, it is believed that sisters' sons are to "rule" their mothers' brothers.

People north of the Nile, such as the Alur and Acholi, recognized the Mukama (king of Bunyoro) as overlord and sent tribute to him. According to the cultural anthropologist Aidan Southall, the Alur recognized their "ritual subordination to Bunyoro by going there for confirmation of their title after accession to kingship" and some Alur kings took Bantu (Nyoro) names. Gifts were given to the king of Bunyoro by Lango and Acholi chiefs, who acknowledged the Nyoro king's supremacy.

The rulers of Bunyoro acted as the ultimate arbiters of the Acholi political system. Disputes about succession to chieftainship were taken to them to settle. Many of the drums and spears which form part of the regalia of Acholi Rwodi are said to have been presented to an ancestor by a past Mukama. Representatives of the Banyoro rulers attended the installation and other ceremonies of the Rwodi of Payera.

After studying their vocabulary, Ronald Atkinson discovered a profound Banyoro socio-political impact on the western Acholi starting around 1680 AD. Great changes are estimated to have occurred in western Acholi land between 1680 and 1780 AD, originating in northern Bunyoro. Many Acholi chiefdoms were established in a period where there was an almost constant migration of Palwo out of northern Bunyoro. The Acholi elder Fidele Lodi of the Ogole clan in Pajule explained that "the most important aspect of the Palwo who came from Bunyoro to Acholi was that wherever they went, they would establish their kingship very quickly over the other people." The Acholi Pajule clan elders say that their great ancestor, Lagoro Aboga came from Bunyoro and brought the royal drum, "bul ker", to the Pajule.

== Culture and society ==
European visitors in the late nineteenth century consistently observed that Bunyoro was one of the most densely populated parts of East Africa." Wilhelm Junker, who had explored much of the Nile Valley before traveling through the heart of Bunyoro in 1886, wrote that 'of all the Negro regions visited by me, Bunyoro and Buganda were by far the most densely populated. Interestingly, in 1893. Henry Colvile, found Bunyoro as a whole to be 'far more thickly populated and highly cultivated' than Buganda, though it is important to note that Buganda had suffered heavy mortality and emigration during its recent civil wars.

In describing the Kingdom of Bunyoro, Samuel Baker states that the people of Bunyoro "have become the most advanced nation in Central Africa; they are well clothed and clean in their persons, courteous and dignified in demeanor, and susceptible of enlarged political organization."

Bunyoro consists of three classes of people: Iru, Huma, and Biito. The distinction between the Iru and Huma has never had the importance in Bunyoro, as it did in other kingdoms such as Ankole or Rwanda.

=== Empaako ===
The Banyoro people have a strong cultural naming system (praise names/pet Names) known as Empaako. With the Empaako naming system, children are given one of twelve names shared across the communities in addition to their given and family names. Addressing someone by his or her Empaako is a positive affirmation of cultural ties. It can be used as a form of greeting or a declaration of affection, respect, honour or love. Use of Empaako can defuse tension or anger and sends a strong message about social identity and unity, peace and reconciliation. The Empaako names are: Amooti, Abbooki, Akiiki, Ateenyi, Adyeri, Atwooki, Abwooli, Araali, Apuuli, Acaali, Bbala, and Okaali.

=== Social Classes ===
The Iru are commoners who engage in farming and some cattle rearing. The Iru were Ironsmiths and provided tools and weapons to the Huma (who themselves did not practice smithing). Intermarriage between the Iru and Huma (Hima) in Bunyoro was never prohibited, and it has always been possible for Bunyoro of Iru (commoner) origin to rise to a high position in the state as many did in historical times. There is a Luo speaking community in the Kibanda county of the Kiryandongo District of northern Bunyoro called the Paluo (or Palwo) or Chope/Chopi. The Paluo were generally regarded as Iru by other Banyoro people. It was possible for Paluo families settling south into the Kitara heartland and assimilating its culture to become part of the Huma category.

The Huma are those engaged only in pastoralism. The name "Bahuma" comes from the verb "okuhuma", which means the "cacophony of sound made by a herd of cattle on the move, lowing, thudding of hooves, and cries of herdsmen". Although the Bahuma claimed and were accorded high status, they have always, as Bahuma, lacked major political importance and they have never been rulers in Bunyoro-Kitara but were herdsmen, who "attached themselves to the great chiefs as custodians of their herds". Samuel Baker describes them:

There is a curious custom throughout Unyoro; a peculiar caste are cattle-keepers. These people only attend to the herds and the profession is inherited from past generations. They are called Bahooma. If the herds are carried off in battle, the Bahooma, who never carry arms, accompany them to their new masters and continue their employment. Nothing but death will separate them from their cattle

The Bahuma loved their cattle so dearly that Gaetano Casati reports that after a Sudanese raid into Bunyoro that captured 10,000 cattle, the Bahuma preferred to serve the Sudanese as cattle keepers rather than be separated [sic] from their cows. Thus The Bahuma willingly followed the raiders with their families.

The Biito are the royal clan of Bunyoro and Tooro. The Babiito are originally descended from the Chwezi prince Kyomya and the Luo woman Nytworo. The Banyoro say, "the Babito are the children (Bana) of the Bacwezi, and the grandchildren (baijukuru) of the Batembuzi". When the Luo diviner Nyakoka left Kitara and entered northern Uganda, he encountered Kyomya's sons resting under a Bito tree, which is where the Bito clan gets its name from (although it is unknown what kind of tree a bito tree was).

=== Art ===
Samuel Baker praised the crafts made by Bunyoro artisans. He said that the Banyoro "make good earthenware, they sew with needles of their own make, the eye of the needles being simply a fine end overlapped; their smiths are clever and use hammers instead of stones as in neighbouring countries and they draw fine brass and copper wire for ornamenting belts, knife handles".

=== Medicine ===
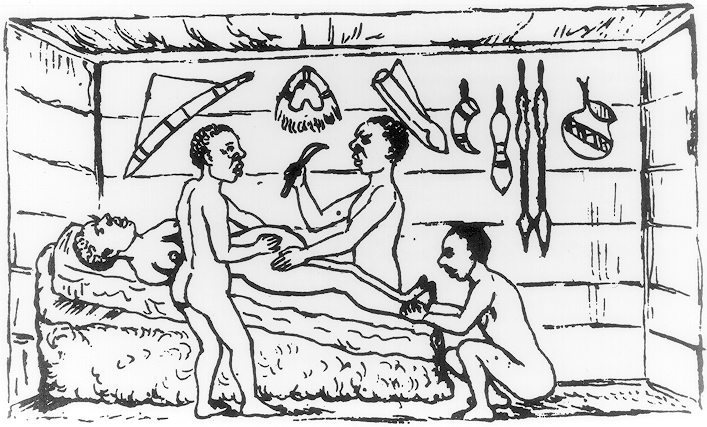
A caesarean delivery performed in Bunyoro as observed by Felkin in 1879.

European travelers in the Great Lakes region of Africa during the 19th century reported cases of surgery in Bunyoro. Medical historians, such as Jack Davies argued in 1959 that Bunyoro's traditional healers were perhaps the most highly skilled in precolonial sub-Saharan Africa, possessing a remarkable level of medical knowledge. One observer noted a "surgical skill which had reached a high standard". Caesarean sections and other abdominal and thoracic operations were performed on a regular basis with the avoidance of hemorrhage and sepsis using antiseptics, anesthetics and cautery iron. The expectant mother was normally anesthetized with banana wine, and herbal mixtures were used to encourage healing. From the well-developed nature of the procedures employed, European observers concluded that they had been employed for some time.

Variolation against smallpox may have been carried out in Bunyoro. Over 200 plants are used medicinally in eastern Bunyoro alone, and recent tests have shown that traditional cures for eczema and post-measles bloody diarrhea were more effective than western medications. Bunyoro's medical elite, the "Bafumu", had a system of apprenticeship and even "met at periods for conferences". In Bunyoro, there was a close relationship between the state and traditional healers. Kings gave healers "land spread in the different areas so that their services would reach more people". Moreover, "in the case of a disease hitting a given area", the king would order healers into the affected district. Kabaleega is said to have provided his soldiers with anti-malarial herbs and even to have organized medical research. A Munyoro healer reported in 1902 that when an outbreak of what he termed sleeping sickness occurred in Bunyoro around 1886–87, causing many deaths, Kabaleega ordered him "to make experiments in the interest of science", which were "eventually successful in procuring a cure". Barkcloth, which was used to bandage wounds, has been proven to be antimicrobial.

Bunyoro's physicians were familiar with surgical asepsis and hand washing. In 1903, British physician Lambkin FJ. documented the practice of inoculation against syphilis in children.

== Economy ==
Bunyoro drew various communities together in trade. This trade heavily depended on Bunyoro's rich salt deposits in the lucrative Kibiro saltworks of Lake Mwitanzige and the saltworks located in Lake Katwe. Bunyoro's markets fostered complex interactions between the Banyoro and regional groups such as the Alur, Acholi, Langi, Kumam Iteso, Basoga, Banyankore, Congolese, and Haya populations, and, further, witnessed brisk trade not only in iron implements, salt, and ivory, but also in items like cattle, foodstuffs, beer, tobacco, and coffee. Even despite their bitter rivalry, Bunyoro traded iron hoes and salt with Buganda in exchange for Barkcloth and Bananas.

Bunyoro blacksmiths were regarded as among the greatest in East Africa. Bunyoro's historical ties with Luo speakers to the north, many of whom considered Bunyoro as "home," and with Buganda to the south secured the stability of trade in Bunyoro. The ties also ensured that "Bunyoro's ironsmiths had a guaranteed market among the Iteso and Langi [to the northeast], peoples who did not smelt". Having the highest quality of metallurgy in the region made it one of the strongest economic and military powers in the Great Lakes region.

=== Slavery ===
Historian John Nyakatura delineates three categories of slaves in the Bunyoro region. The first category, known as "Embomboza," consists of individuals who were found wandering without a home or family, likely as a result of conflict or famine. The second category encompasses individuals who were captured during warfare. The third category comprises those who were acquired through purchase from neighboring kingdoms.

Slaves taken in war could marry (with their masters even helping them marry), and their children would be seen as full members of their master's clan. If the slaves kin came later to claim them, their children would never be given back. They were now part of the clan.

King Kabalega forcibly relocated various ethnic groups into Bunyoro to ease the demographic crisis the kingdom was experiencing. When he reconquered Busongora and the Tooro Kingdom he relocated many Bahuma herders into the Nyoro heartland. The Masindi area was settled by Alur slaves and entire Bakonjo families from the Rwenzori region were settled into central Bunyoro and were almost completely culturally assimilated into Bunyoro society by 1900.

The Banyoro community was generally mindful of the treatment of their slaves, driven by a cultural belief in the potential repercussions of mistreatment (their ghosts returning to seek retribution). It is said within the community, "If you ever mistreated a slave, his ghost would always disturb the family. And that one is very, very dangerous, even more dangerous than the ghost of a relative."

If a female slave had a child with her master, then that child would be considered free and not discriminated against in Nyoro society. Female slaves who married their masters were no longer treated as slaves or overworked.

Slaves were able to rise to political power. A famous example of this is Nyakamatura, who was a slave of Iru origin. King Kamarusi recognized Nyakamatura's talents, freed him, and made him a chief. Nyakamatura was a friend of Kamamrusi's son, Kabalega, which caused the Iru chief's status to rise even further in society. After Kabalega took the throne he honored Nyakamatura by naming him the first minister.

If a man did not have children or close relatives, he could appoint a slave as his heir. The slave would inherit the household after his master's death, along with the master's wives and the associated clan affiliations. Additionally, the children of the designated heir would be granted full recognition as clan members, ensuring their place within the community.

The Paluo in Bunyoro conducted their own slave raids. Slaves were given to the wealthy and powerful men of their community. If a slave behaved in a good manner, he was permitted to participate in all community activities, much as any Paluo-born man, and he could marry a Paluo girl. The slave would still remain serving his master and dependent on him, but he could attain wealth and status in Paluo society.

== Military ==
Kabalega created a standing army called the "Abarusura". Most members of Bunyoro's army were Iru, such as Rwabudongo, who was the leader of the army.

The army of Bunyoro was supplemented with mercenaries from foreign ethnic groups such as the Lango. War captives could also be integrated into the military, such as in the case of Ireeta, who was freed and eventually became one of Bunyoro's leading generals.

Kabalega defeated the rebellious Paluo in northern Bunyoro and put them back under Bunyoro's authority, and the Acholi and Alur tribes across the Nile were forced to pay tribute.

Bunyoro's army achieved a significant victory against the Baganda (who outnumbered them) at the Battle of Rwangabi (or Rwengabi) in February 1886. Following this victory, the army occupied parts of western Buganda and enslaved 20,000 Baganda.

== Infrastructure ==
Bunyoro boasted an impressive and well-maintained network of roads, which facilitated efficient movement throughout the region. Henry Colvile effectively utilized these routes to swiftly transport his army, taking advantage of the carefully constructed bridges that spanned the streams. John Roscoe, a missionary, also picked up on Bunyoro's network of roads.

=== Communication ===
The people of Bunyoro developed a form of writing based on a floral code

It is especially interesting that the form of writing that developed in Bunyoro was based on a floral code, as the absence of both writing and flowers in African culture have been used by Jack Goody as evidence of African culture's separateness from that of "Eurasia." Goody has written that African peoples generally did not make significant use of flowers in worship, gift-giving or decoration. He does "not know of any indigenous use of odours", nor of plants playing a role in stories or myths. This is thought to be because of Africa's "simple" agriculture, "non-complex" societies and absence of a "culture of luxury". This description of African life does not fit well with what we know of precolonial Bunyoro, a large, relatively ancient, and extremely hierarchical kingdom, and the analysis of the role of flowers was quite inaccurate.

— Shane Doyle, The Language of Flowers: Knowledge, Power and Ecology in Precolonial Bunyoro
