= Gaetano Casati =

Italian explorer of East and Central Africa and travel writer

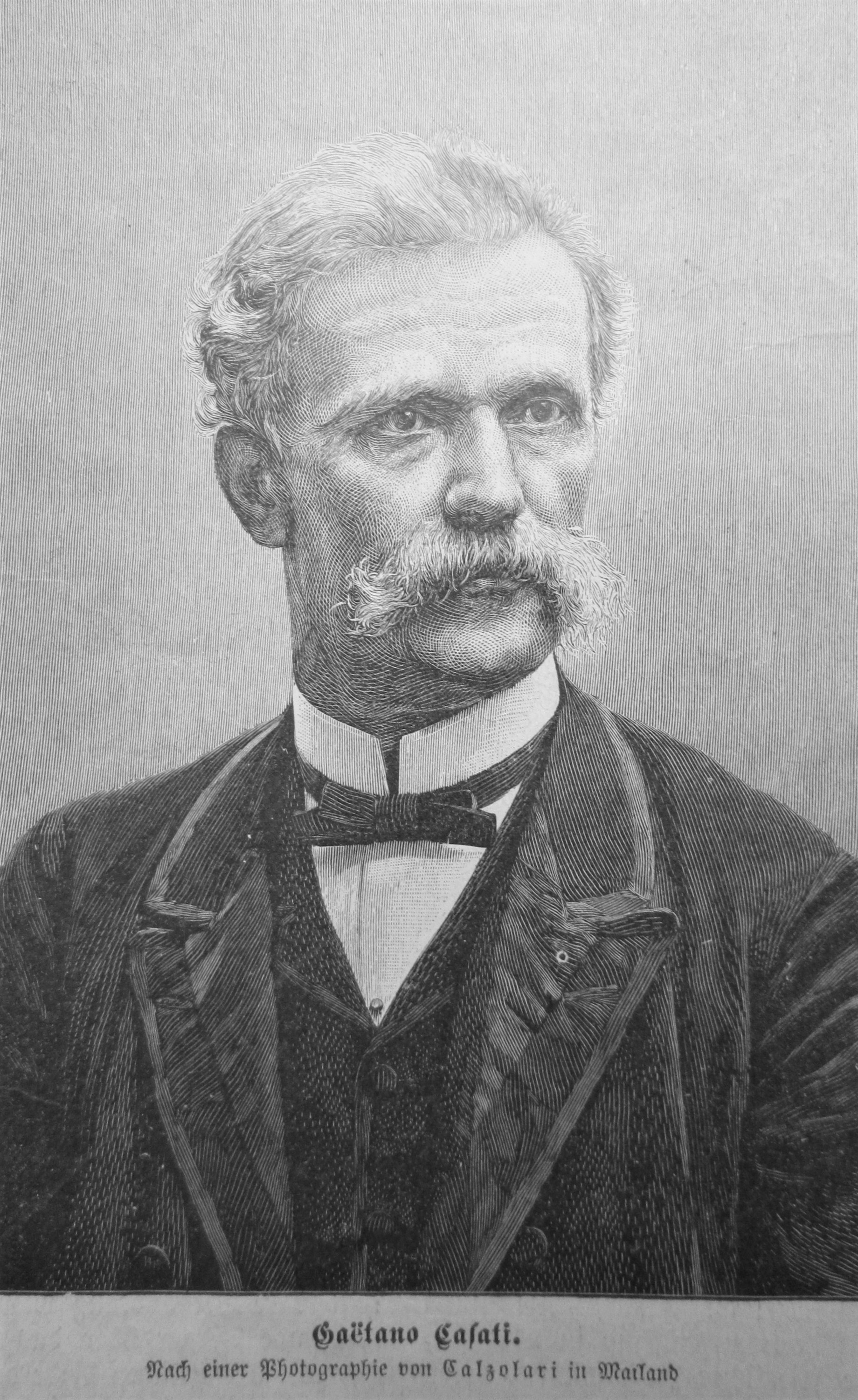
- Gaetano Casati, from German magazine Die Gartenlaube, 1891
- Born: 4 September 1838; Lesmo, Austrian Empire
- Died: 7 March 1902 (aged 63)
- Occupations: Explorer; Travel writer

Gaetano Casati (4 September 1838 – 7 March 1902) was an Italian explorer of Africa, born in Lesmo (now in the Italian region Lombardy), at that time in the Austrian Empire.

After studying at the Academy in Pavia he entered the Italian army in 1859 and served there until 1879. On December 24, 1879, he sailed for Africa under commission of the Società d'Esplorazione Commerciale d'Africa. He followed the course of the Welle river and explored the basin of the Bahr-el-Ghazal. In 1882 he was held prisoner for some time by native chiefs of Uganda. In 1883 he joined Emin Pasha and was shut in with him by the Mahdi insurrection. Subsequently, he lived in the Kingdom of Kabba Rega, was condemned to death by the monarch, but escaped to Lake Albert, where Emin Pasha rescued him in 1888. In December 1889, Casati reached the coast with Emin Pasha and Henry Morton Stanley, who had led the Emin Pasha Relief Expedition.

Besides reports about his travels, he published Dieci anni in Equatoria in two volumes in 1891. (transl.: "Ten Years in Equatoria", 1891), especially valuable for its account of the Niam-Niam, whom he visited in 1883.

== Works ==
- Gaetano, Casati (1891). Dieci anni in Equatoria e ritorno con Emin Pascia (in Italian). Milano, Dumolard.
