= Tooro people =

Abatooro
- Flag of the Tooro Kingdom

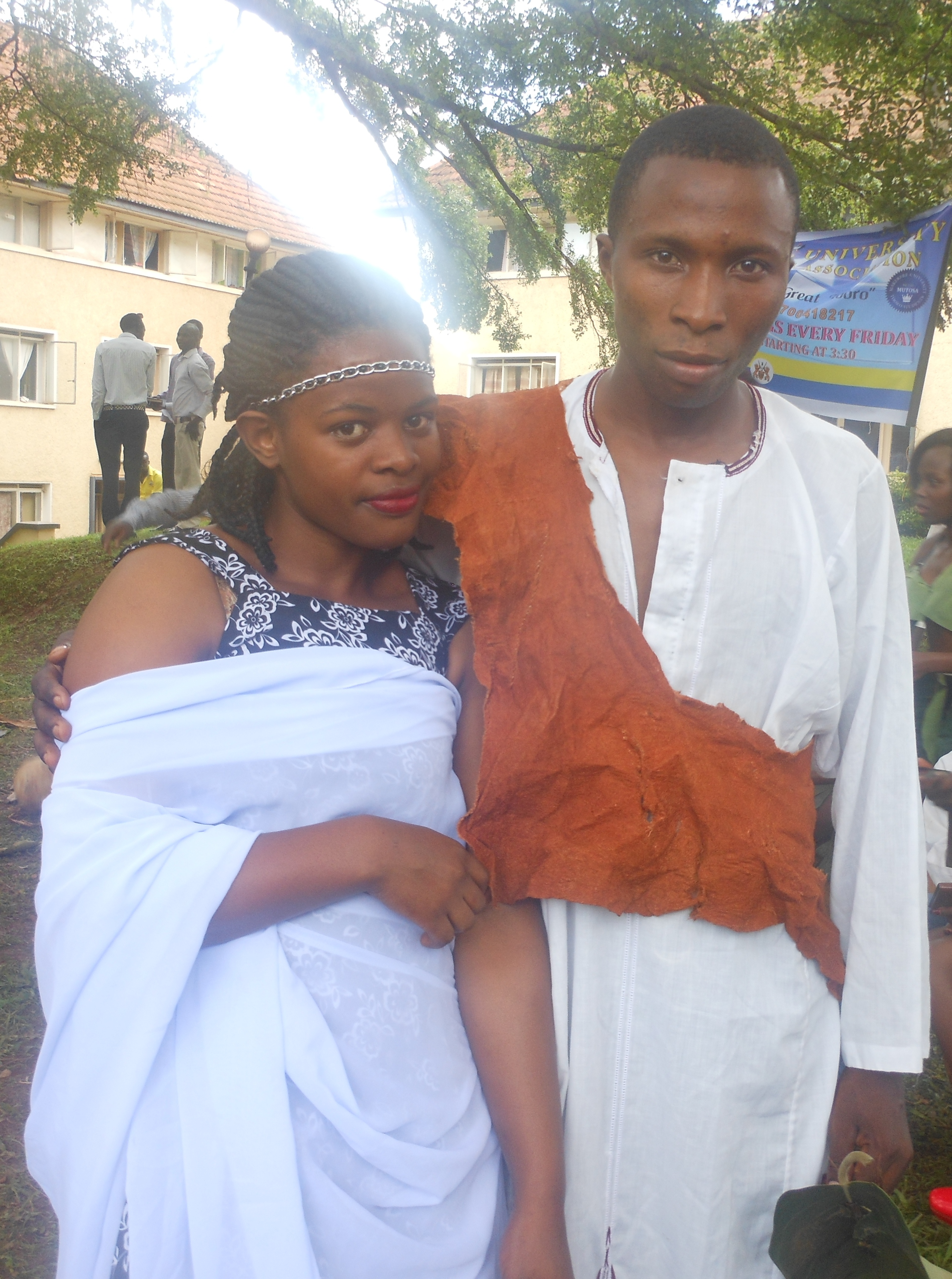

Total population
- 810,708

Regions with significant populations
- Uganda

Languages
- Rutooro and English

Religion
- Christianity, Tooro Religion, Islam

Related ethnic groups
- other Rutara people (Banyoro, Banyankole, Bakiga, Bahema, Bahaya and Baruuli)

Tooro
- Person: Omutooro
- People: Abatooro
- Language: Orutooro
- Country: Obukama bwa Tooro

The Tooro people (/ˈtɔːroʊ/; Tooro: Abatooro, [aβatóːɾo]), also known as Batooro or Toro people are a Bantu ethnic group, native to the Tooro Kingdom, a subnational constitutional monarchy within Uganda.

== Religion ==
According to the 2002 Census of Uganda 48.8% of Batoro are Roman Catholic, 30.8% are Anglican (Church of Uganda), 7.3% follow other religions and 5.4% are Muslim and 5.2% are Pentecostal.

== Population ==
As of December 2014 the following administrative districts constitute the Tooro Kingdom: (a) Kabarole District (b) Kamwenge District (c) Kyegegwa District and (d) Kyenjojo District. Those four districts had a combined total population of about 1 million people, according to the 2002 national population census.

== Clans ==
Tooro people are divided into individual clans, and most Tooro clans have a totem which spiritually represents them.

== Culture ==
Since Fort Portal Tourism city is the headquarter of Tooro Kingdom, the area has two inscribed elements of Empaako and Koogere oral traditions on UNESCO's list of Intangible Cultural Heritage in Need of Urgent Safeguarding. The Tooro cultural dance is called Kinyege. Another important dance is the Orunyege-Ntogoro, a courtship dance.

== Prominent people ==
The following individuals are some of the prominent Batooro:

1. Elizabeth Bagaya - She is a lawyer, politician, diplomat, model and actress. She was the first female East African to be admitted to the English Bar. She is a paternal aunt of the Omukama of Tooro, Oyo Nyimba Kabamba Iguru Rukidi IV.
2. Edward Bitanywaine Rugumayo - He is a politician, diplomat, author, academic and environmentalist. Current University Chancellor of Kampala University and of Mountains of the Moon University
3. Brigadier Nobel Mayombo (1965–2007) - He was military officer in the UPDF and a Member of Parliament (MP).
4. Andrew Mwenda - Journalist and entrepreneur. Founder and owner of The Independent, a current affairs newsmagazine.
5. Brigadier Kayanja Muhanga - He is an army officer. He currently serves as the Commander of the UPDF Contingent in South Sudan. He was appointed to that position in January 2014 by General Yoweri Museveni, the Commander in Chief of the UPDF and the President of Uganda.
6. Professor John Ntambirweki - A lawyer, academic and academic administrator. He is the current Vice Chancellor of Uganda Pentecostal University, a private university, located in Fort Portal, Western Uganda.
7. Dr. Godfrey Bahiigwa - Economist and entrepreneur. Director of Agriculture and Rural Development at the African Union Commission in Addis Ababa, Ethiopia.

== See also ==
- Bunyoro
- Buganda
- Busoga
- Tooro Kingdom
- Gisu
- Acholi
- Ankole
