= Rutamirika =

Ugandan playwright and actor (1959–2008)

- Born: Winkle Wa Karitundu; 1959; Kyankukwe Mitooma District Western Region Uganda
- Died: March 2008 (aged 48–49); Kevina Nsambya Kampala
- Cause of death: Murdered with a stick
- Citizenship: Ugandan
- Education: Mitooma Boys P/Sch; St. Kaggwa Bushenyi High School; Bikungu Teachers College, Mutara; Kabale NTC; Uganda College of Commerce
- Occupations: Playwright; actor; producer; teacher/lecturer

Winkle Wa Karitundu, professionally known as Rutamirika was an Ugandan playwright, actor, producer and singer-songwriter. He was most popular in western Uganda and Rwanda.

== Career ==
Rutamirika wrote and produced low budget films and stage productions in Runyankole-Rukiga languages from the late 1980s under his real name Winkle Karitundu. He however gained more popularity when he acted the role of Rutamirika in his 1990s film Rutamirika. He later started using Rutamirika as his professional name in all of his future productions. He formed and joined a number of drama clubs including Abafirika Entertainment, Kigezi Kinimba Actors, Ankole Actors, Banyakitara and Rugo Actors which are all in western Uganda, and his brother Nyangi is a music producer in Mbarara.

== Death ==
Rutamirika was murdered at his residence's entrance in Kevina, Nsambya, in Kampala on the night of March 15, 2008 while he and his wife returned home from the nearby Texas Club Nsambya which they owned. Investigations showed that Rutamirika was killed by a Congolese mineral dealer named Christiano Bulira with the help of Rutamirika's wife. Bulira had met Rutamirika at the Texas club where he was a regular customer and big spender, and had become friends. He later became Rutamirika's wife's lover and the two planned to kill Rutamirika and keep their relationship as well as becoming partners at the club. Bulira and Mrs. Karitundu were convicted on February 23, 2011. One year later, Bulira was sentenced to 50 years imprisonment while Mrs. Karitundu was sentenced to 25 years imprisonment for aiding in the murder of her husband. The judge Justice Catherine Bamugemereire of the High Court of Uganda argued that Mrs. Karitundu did not actually bludgeon her husband but needed to be punished for planning a murder.

In 2008, after his death, a vigil was held at the Uganda National Theatre for Rutamirika where they premiered a documentary film titled Bye Bye Rutamirika about his life and works. It was organized by the Abfirika Group, a drama group for which Rutamirika was a co-director.

== Filmography ==
- Tindarwetsire
- Rutamirika
- Omwaana w'abandi
- Bye Bye Rutamirika
