= Ruth Alice Fisher =

British missionary in Uganda (1875–1959)

Ruth Alice Fisher, née Hurditch (1875–1959), sometimes referred to as Ruth B. Fisher, was a British CMS missionary to Uganda. Her Times obituarist labelled her "one of the great Victorians".

== Life ==
Ruth Hurditch was born in Marylebone in 1875, the sixth child of an evangelical missioner, C. Russell Hurditch. She helped her father organize mass meetings in Exeter Hall. In 1900 – despite a Cockney accent which led to some opposition from the Ladies' Consultative Committee – she travelled to Toro, Uganda to work for the Church Missionary Society. In On the Borders of Pygmy Land (1904), Fisher described the women of Toro "before the advent of Christianity", in terms which are clearly freighted with gender, class and imperial expectations:

As they sat, day by day, huddled together in their dirty little grass homes, their conversations scarcely ever ventured outside the well-beaten track of real or imaginary sickness, and the usual revolting topics that polygamy and heathenism suggest. Modesty, reserve, shame and sensitiveness were not known among them. One's whole nature recoils from the recollections of Africa's lost womanhood.

In 1902, she married the Rev. Arthur Bryan Fisher, another CMS missionary whom she met at Kabarole. The couple moved to Bunyoro, where she became interested in local history and began to collect oral folk tales. She published her collection as Twilight Tales of the Black Baganda (1911).

After returning to England, she acted as unpaid curate to her husband, in Leeds, south London and Sussex parishes. She had six children, including the clergyman and writer A. S. T. Fisher. A skilled orator and preacher, she spoke at the 1927 CMS Uganda Jubilee meeting in the Albert Hall, speaking after Lord Lugard. Geoffrey Fisher, later Archbishop of Canterbury, invited her to preach to Repton School.

Fisher died on 14 November 1959. Her granddaughter, Margaret Surie, published a biographical account of her in 2010.

== Works ==
- On the Borders of Pygmy Land. London: Marshall brothers, 1904.
- Twilight Tales of the Black Baganda. London: Marshall brothers, 1911. 2nd ed., 1970, with an introduction by Merrick Posnansky.
