= Solomon Iguru I =

Omukama of Bunyoro
- Reign: Since 11 June 1994
- Coronation: 11 June 1994
- Predecessor: None – Kingdom exiled from 1967–1993 before exile: (Winyi IV) (as Omukama of Bunyoro)
- Heir apparent: Crown Prince David Mpuga (16 May 2006)
- Born: 18 June 1948 (age 78)
- Consort: Omugo Margaret Karunga Adyeeri
Names
- Rukirabasaija Agutamba Solomon Gafabusa Iguru I
- House: Babiito Dynasty
- Father: Winyi IV of Bunyoro
- Mother: Getrude Komweru Gafabusa Ateenyi

Omukama Rukirabasaija Agutamba Solomon Gafabusa Iguru I (born 18 June 1948) is the 27th King of Bunyoro from 1994 to present. The King's traditional alternative name used by family (known as empaako) is Amooti.

Solomon Iguru I rose to the throne in 1994. His father, Sir Winyi IV of Bunyoro, reigned from 1927 to 1967. In 1967, the Ugandan government under Milton Obote abolished kingdoms.

In recent years, Solomon Iguru has promoted the Kingdom by founding the Association of the Representatives of Bunyoro-Kitara.

Solomon was formally recognised in the Uganda Gazette legal notice No. 303 of 2014. On 17 October 2024, he was airlifted from his palace using an army helicopter sent by President Museveni after suffering a strange flu. The Kingdom premier asked the King's subjects to remain calm in that difficult situation.

== Awards ==
List of awards:

- Grand Cordon, Royal and Hashemite Order of the Pearl (Royal House of Sulu, Philippines)
- Grand Cross, Order of Saint Lazarus
- Grand Cross, Order of the Queen of Sheba (Ethiopia)
- Kabalega Star, Republic of Uganda
- Grand Collar of the Royal Order of Merit of Prince Uchicho

== See also ==
- List of current constituent African monarchs

Preceded by None	Omukama of Bunyoro; 1994 – present	Succeeded by None
