= Hema people =

Bantu ethnic group

- Map showing the location of Ituri Province in the Democratic Republic of the Congo

Total population
- c.160,000

Regions with significant populations
- Ituri Province, Democratic Republic of the Congo

Languages
- Northern Hema: Lendu language Southern Hema: Hema language Both sides: French

Religion
- Catholicism

Related ethnic groups
- Other Rutara people (Banyoro, Batooro, Bakiga, Banyankore, Bahororo, Basongora, Baruuli and Bahaya)

The Hema people or Bahema (plural) are a Bantu ethnic group who are concentrated in parts of Ituri Province in the eastern Democratic Republic of the Congo.

== Ethnic group ==
The Hema are a Bantu ethnic group, related to the Banyoro, Batooro, Bahaya, Basongora, Bahororo, Baruuli and Bagungu. They were historically pastoralists and migrated into Ituri from modern-day Uganda in the early 19th century, making them one of the last groups to settle in the region. The Hema are usually considered to fall into two distinct ethnic sub-groups:

- The Northern Hema (Gegere) speak the Kilendu or Batha languages and are concentrated in Djugu Territory. They historically intermarried with the Lendu majority population.
- The Southern Hema (Nyoro) speak Kihema or Kinyoro languages and live mostly in Irumu Territory. They historically remained segregated from the Lendu.

There are generally thought to be 160,000 people who consider themselves Hema, mostly concentrated in Ituri Province in the Democratic Republic of the Congo. Collectively, the Hema and Lendu people account for around 40 percent of the population in Ituri. They are a minority ethnic group, and one of 18 present in the same province. Most Hema are Christians.

== Hema-Lendu ethnic tensions ==
It is generally considered that the Hema became more ethnically distinct under Belgian colonial rule when they were seen as more civilised than other populations in Ituri. Considered part of the mythical "Hamitic" people like the Babiito, Banyoro and Songora in neighboring Uganda, Rwanda and Burundi, some Hema imagined joining with the aforementioned ethnic groups to form a Hima Kingdom. Hema political pre-eminence continued in Ituri after Congolese independence in 1960. Ethnic Hema continued to dominate local political appointments and business, at the expense of the Lendu who were largely excluded. Land reforms introduced by the regime of Mobutu Sese Seko, in 1973, allowed Hema to partly dispossess land held by Lendu peasants.

The ethnic tensions between Lendu and Hema was the primary cause of the Ituri conflict (1999–2003) which led to a collapse of state control in the region and genocidal violence. This was partly caused by the democratisation of Mobutu's regime which allowed the emergence of a Lendu elite before it collapsed entirely in the First Congo War (1996–97). However, the Rwandan Genocide was also important because the divide between Tutsi and Hutu was also commonly projected over the Hema and Lendu respectively by both sides. During the Second Congo War, the Hema were widely believed to have collaborated with the Ugandan occupiers and the Ituri conflict was sparked by the installation of a Hema provincial governor by the Ugandan military in Ituri. Ethnic militias were formed and United Nations and European Union peacekeepers were deployed. In the ensuing conflict the Hema-backed Union of Congolese Patriots (Union des Patriotes congolais, UPC) fought the Lendu-backed Nationalist and Integrationist Front (Front des Nationalistes et Intégrationnistes, FNI) and various smaller groups. Sporadic fighting has continued since 1999. Uganda also became involved in the fighting which was aggravated by the presence of significant gold deposits in Ituri.

== See also ==
- Hema language
- Hima language
