= Rutara peoples =

Total population
- 14,606,000

Regions with significant populations
- Uganda, Tanzania, the DRC and Rwanda

Languages
- Rutara languages

Religion
- Predominantly: Christianity; Traditionally: Belief in Ruhanga

Related ethnic groups
- other Great Lakes Bantu people

The Rutara peoples (endonym: Banyakitara, Abanyakitara) are a group of closely related Bantu ethnic groups native to the African Great Lakes region. They speak mutually intelligible dialects and include groups such as the Banyoro, Banyankore, and Bahaya.

== History ==
Proto-Rutara people originated in the Kagera Region of Tanzania near Bukoba in the year 500AD. They adopted pastoralism in the grasslands of Kagera with influence from the now extinct Tale southern Cushites and Sog Eastern Sudanic peoples who were their neighbors. They adopted the word for cow (ente) between 100-500AD from the Sog Eastern Sahelians, and the practice of cattle breeding from the Tale southern Cushites.

After 1200AD they split into two groups, with one group (the Proto-North Rutara) expanding north-westwards, spreading the Rutara language and culture (and assimilating many of the previous Central Sudanic peoples like the Madi in the process) into the Grasslands of western Uganda and eastern Democratic Republic of Congo, regions that would one day become Bunyoro, Nkore, and Mpororo among others. This movement of ideas and practices is likely to have marked the inception of the eras of the Batembuzi and Bacwezi, a period only dimly and fabulously remembered in the later oral traditions, but one in which the key political ideas and economic structures of the later kingdoms first began to be put into effect.
