= Nyoro people =

Ethnic group

Abanyoro
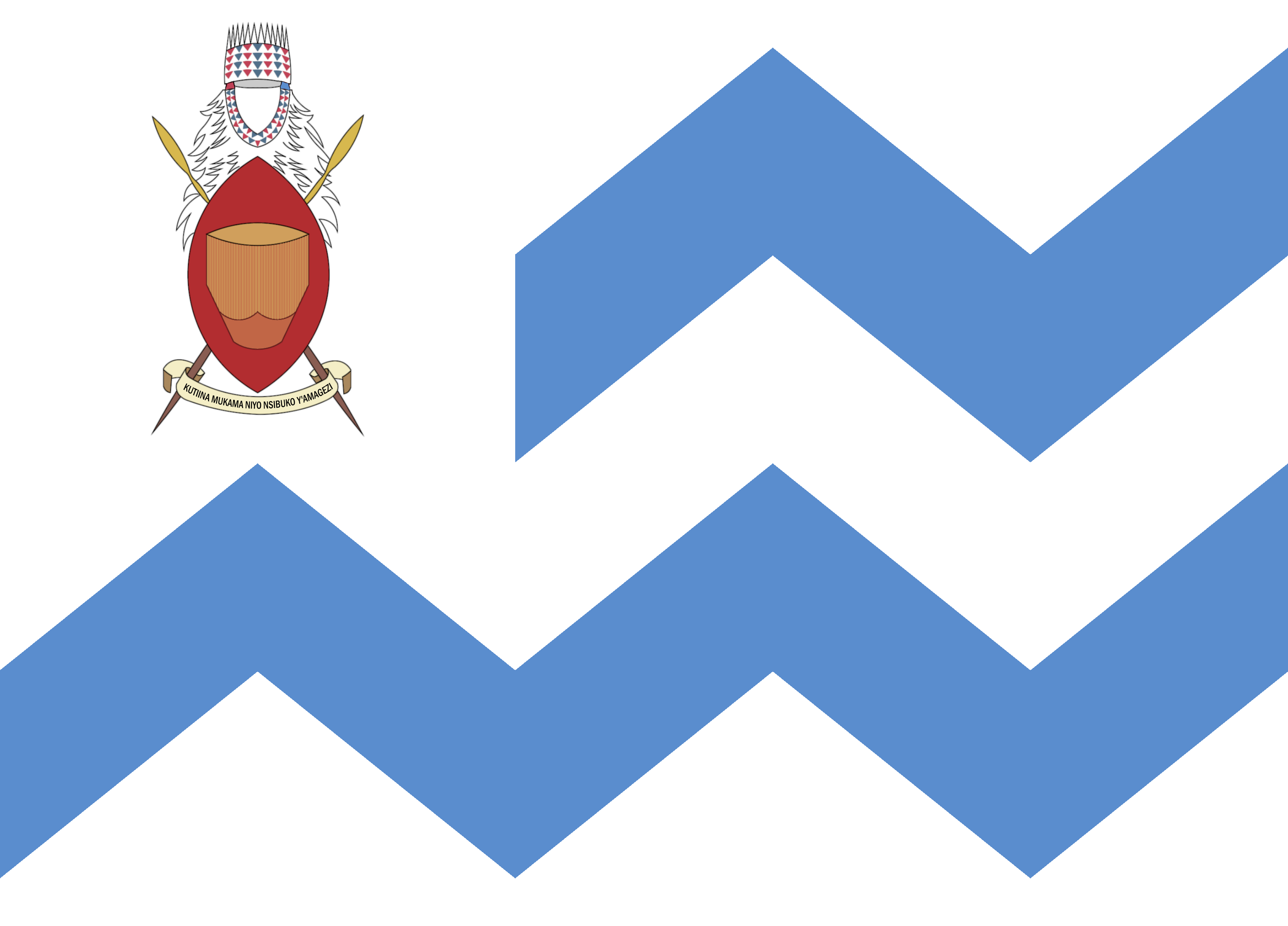
- Flag of the BaNyoro

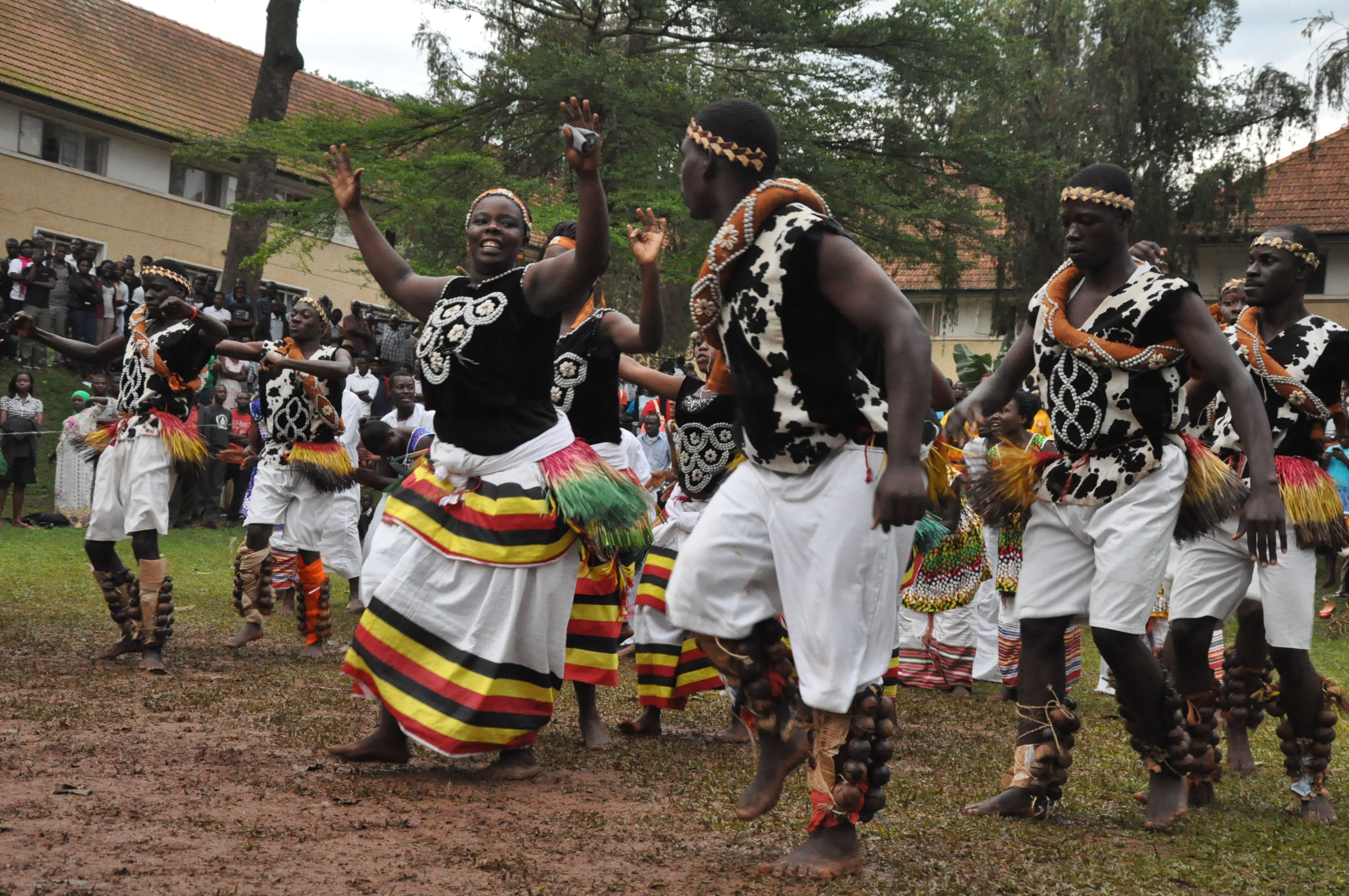

Total population
- 966,976

Regions with significant populations
- Uganda

Languages
- Runyoro and English

Religion
- Christianity, Islam and Nyoro Religion

Related ethnic groups
- other Rutara people (Batooro, Banyankole, Bakiga, Bahema, Baruuli and Bahaya)

- Person: OmuNyoro
- People: AbaNyoro
- Language: OruNyoro
- Country: BuNyoro

The Nyoro people (Abanyoro, [aβaɲôɾo]), also known as Banyoro, are a Bantu ethnic group native to the kingdom of Bunyoro in Uganda. They live in settlements on a well-watered and fertile plateau. Banyoro are closely related to other Bantu peoples of the region, namely the Batooro, Banyankole, Bakiga and the Bahema peoples.

== Name ==
They are mentioned under various names in various sources. Some of their names include Bakitara, Banyoro, Bunyoro, Gungu, Kitara, Kyopi, Nyoros, Ouanyoro, Runyoro, Vouanyoro, and Wanyoro.

== The Kingdom of Bunyoro ==
Bunyoro is one of the Bantu kingdoms of Uganda. The Nyoro were traditionally pastoral, but war and disease have mostly wiped out former herds. The Nyoro state was ruled by a king and his hierarchy of feudal chiefs. Traditionally, there is a hierarchy of appointed territorial chiefs. There are four grades of chief. Each chief is responsible for a specific territory and reports to the authority next above him.

== Social structure ==
There are about 150 totemic patrilineal clans. Clans are known as ruganda. Each clan has a head, called the mukuru w'oruganda, or the senior member of the clan.

Every social relationship had a hierarchical aspect. There are two ways the Nyoro distinguish kin. One may distinguish people by reference to their genealogical proximity to oneself, or one may refer to the person's generation and sex and whether the relationship is through the mother or the father. The Nyoro may refer to other people in their clan as "brothers", "fathers", "sons", etc.

In a family, the father is the head of the family, and he is the mukama, or the master of owner of everyone in the household and all possessions. For example, even if a son purchases livestock, the son cannot sell or kill the animal without the father's approval. Disputes between a son and his wife must also be taken to his father for settlement, and the son cannot give corporal punishment to his wife unless his father gives his permission. The son cannot wear the father's clothes or use his spear while the father is alive. If the son is the heir, the father will formally hand over the spear in an inheritance ceremony. The father can also fine his son if the son breaks any of these rules.

In a family, there is only one heir. Movable property can be divided among the sons, but the household and land are given to the heir. The heir may also inherit the late father's widows, and he can take them as his wives (except for his own mother). But if a widow does not want to be inherited, then she does not have to be, and she can choose to live with other kinsman of the deceased. If she marries someone else, the bridewealth paid for her should be returned.

When women marry, they leave their homes and become part of her husband's family, since property and status are inherited by males only. Fathers also have rule over daughters. In the Nyoro language, when people speak about marriage, men marry, and women are married.

The relationship between grandfathers and grandchildren are friendlier, unlike the relationship between fathers and children. For example, children can touch their grandfather's hair or beard, but they cannot do so with their father.

In the past the Nyoro would practice dental avulsion via the removal of the 4 lower incisors.

== See also ==
- Ethnic groups in Africa

== Other sources ==
=== Books ===
- David Kihumuro Apuuli, A thousand years of Bunyoro-Kitara Kingdom : the people and the rulers, Fountain Publishers, Kampala, 1994, 144 p.
- John Beattie, The Nyoro state, Clarendon Press, Oxford, 1971, 280 p.
- A.B.T. Byaruhanga-Akiiki, Religion in Bunyoro, Kenya Literature Bureau, Nairobi, 1982, 256 p. (texte remanié d'une thèse soutenue à l'Université Makerere en 1971)
- Brian Kingzett Taylor, The Western Lacustrine Bantu (Nyoro, Toro, Nyankore, Kiga, Haya and Zinza, with sections on the Amba and Konjo), International African Institute, Londres, 1962, 159 p.
- John Roscoe, The Bakitara or Banyoro (Mackie ethnological expedition to Central Africa), Gregg, Farnborough, 1968, 370 p. (fac simile de l'éd. de 1923, Cambridge University Press)

=== Discographie ===
- Royal Court Music from Uganda (Ganda, Nyoro, Ankole), collecteur Hugh Tracey, Sharp Wood Productions, 1998 (enregistrement 1950-1952)
- 'Music Of Africa Series No. 8 The Uganda Protectorate', Collected and recorded by Hugh Tracey, DECCA LF1173
