= List of African musical instruments =

The following is a list of musical instruments from the Africa continent as well as their countries or regions of origin.

== A ==
- Adungu (Uganda)
- African fiddle
- African harp (Sub-Saharan)
- Agogô (West Africa)
- Ahoko
- Algerian mandole (Algeria)
- Amakondere (Uganda)
- Anglo concertina
- Arghul (North Africa)

== B ==
- Balafon (Mali)
- Banjo music
- Batá drum (Nigeria)
- Begena (Ethiopia)
- Belly harp (West Africa)
- Bendir (North Africa)
- Bobre (Mauritius)

== C ==
- Calabash (percussion)
- Castanets
- Cavaquinho (Mozambique)

== D ==
- Deze (Zimbabwe)
- Djembe (West Africa)
- Dunun (West Africa)

== E ==
- Endingidi (Uganda)
- Endongo (Uganda)
- Erikundi

== G ==
- Goblet drum
- Goema (South Africa)

== H ==
- Hosho (instrument) (Zimbabwe)

== I ==
- Ilimba (Tanzania)
- Ilimba drum (Zimbabwe)
- Inanga (instrument) (Burundi, Rwanda, Uganda, and parts of the Democratic Republic of Congo)

== J ==
- Janzi (musical instrument) (Uganda)

== K ==
- Kabosy (Madagascar)
- Kakaki (Ethiopia)
- Kalimba (West Africa)
- Kalindula (Southern Africa)
- Kalumbu (Zimbabwe)
- Kayamb (Mauritius)
- Kebero (Ethiopia)
- Kissar (Ethiopia)
- Kontigi (West Africa)
- Krakebs (Algeria)
- Krar (Ethiopia)
- Kwitra (Algeria)

== L ==
- Lamellophone
- Lesiba (Southern Africa)
- Litungu (Kenya)
- Lokanga bara (Madagascar)

== M ==
- Malimbe (Congo)
- Marovany (Madagascar)
- Matepe (Zimbabwe)
- Masenqo (Ethiopia)
- Mbira (Zimbabwe)
- Mišnice
- Mizwad (Algeria)
- Musical bow (Southern Africa)
- Msondo (Tanzania)

== N ==
- Ndzendze (Comoros)
- Ndzumara (Comoros)
- Ngoni (West Africa)
- Nyatiti (Kenya)
- Nyele (Zambia)

== O ==
- Obokano (Kenya)
- Omubanda (Uganda)
- Omukuli (Uganda)
- Orutu (Kenya)
- Oud (Somalia)

== R ==
- Rakatak (Ghana)
- Ralé-poussé (Réunion)
- Ramkie (Southern Africa)
- Ravanne (Mauritius)
- Rhaita (Morocco)
- Rock gong (West Africa)

== S ==
- Segankuru (Botswana)
- Shekere (West Africa)
- Sintir (Algeria)
- Sistrum (Ethiopia)
- Slit drum (found throughout Africa)
- Sodina (Madagascar)

== T ==
- Taarija (Morocco)
- Tadghtita (Algeria)
- Tanbūra (lyre) (Somalia)
- Tar (drum)
- Taralila (Madagascar)
- Tbilat (Morocco)
- Tom (Ethiopian instrument) (Ethiopia)
- Trough zither (East and Central Africa)

== U ==
- Udu (Nigeria)
- Uhadi musical bow (Southern Africa)

== V ==
- Valiha (Madagascar)

== W ==
- Washint (Ethiopia)
- Wazza (Sudan)

== X ==
- Xalam (West Africa)
- Xylophone

== Z ==
- Zeze (instrument) (Sub-Saharan Africa)
- Zukra (Libya)
- Zurna (Algeria)
