= Ugandan traditional musical instruments =

Ugandan traditional musical instruments are musical instruments used in the traditional music of Uganda across a wide variety of kingdoms and cultures. They consist of a range of percussion, string, and wind instruments, used for anything from simple communication to religious ceremonies.

== Percussion instruments ==
=== Drums ===
Ngoma drums
Drums made of wood and covered with cowhide, usually played in an ensemble of seven drums for celebration, communication, and storytelling, as well as being associated with royalty.

Embuutu (big drum)
Considered the 'female' drum, a short and wide double-membrane drum made of wood and cowhide. Used for melody of everyday life and the responsibilities of the women in a community.

Engalabi (long drum)
Considered the 'male' drum, a tall single-membrane drum made of wood and reptile skin. Played using only the hands and used in many ceremonies.

Entenga Drums
Set of Ngoma Drums specific to the Buganda kingdom, consisting of single-headed drums made of wood and covered in cowhide, played by striking them with a curved stick called an enga. Contain a stone or similar object that rattles when the drums are struck. Part of a set of royal instruments in the Buganda Kingdom.

Bakisimba
Referred to as the master drum, it is the largest of the Entenga drums. Makes a louder bass sound.

Empuunya
An Entenga drum similar to the Bakisimba in shape and sound, but slightly smaller.

Nankasa
Much smaller Entenga drum, making a loud, high-pitched sound.

Namadu Drums
A set of 7 drums vital to the identity of the Bagwere people of Uganda. Played by one person during ceremonies to honor the dead, traditional rituals, celebrations, etc.

=== Idiophones ===
Akogo
A thumb piano made of a solid wood base with flexible metal tongues, which are plucked to create vibrations. Often played by one person, accompanied by a sung lament to relieve fatigue.

Akadinda
A large xylophone, traditionally with 22 keys, that is played by 3 or more people using mallets. The akadinda consists of a base made of two banana stems, with sticks pushed vertically into them, and keys that are placed between the sticks and across both banana stems.

Amadinda
A smaller version of the Akadinda, most often with 12 keys.

=== Rattles ===
Akacence
A box-shaped rattle composed of many short sticks and filled with dried seeds. They are played by shaking them side-to-side and are used to accompany the singing and dancing of women.

Ensaasi (Enseege)
A gourd-shaped shaker with a handle that is filled with pebbles (or something similar) to rattle when shaken. Used to accompany other instruments instead of being played solo.

Endege
Sets of metal bells with a strap, mostly tied to the ankles of dancers to accentuate their movements. Despite this being the most common use, they are versatile and can also be tied to the wrists or shaken by hand.

== String instruments ==
Adungu
Also called an Endongo, a bow harp consisting of a hollow and arched wooden body covered with cowhide, with strings connecting the body to a wooden branch on the end. Come in a variety of sizes that produce multiple vocal ranges, most commonly solo, middle, tenor and bass. Often used to lead wedding dances, but can be played solo or accompanied by other instruments.

Ennanga
A bow harp similar to the Adungu used for a variety of purposes, from accompanying other instruments, to storytelling, to entertaining during royal ceremonies.

Endingidi
A single-string fiddle made with a string attached to a flexible stick and played with a bow. They sometimes also contain a resonator. It is usually played solo to accompany and aid verbal communication.

Inanga (Enanga)
An African zither composed of eight strings across a slightly curved board, resembling a platter. They are used to tell many different types of stories and songs, from epics and dirges to love songs.

Sekitulege
Commonly known as Berimbau, a single flexible stick with both ends connected by a single string. It is played using a short stick or coin to pluck the string, and it typically has a gourd-shaped resonator attached near the bottom end. Due to its simple design (inspired by the hunting bows), it is thought to be the predecessor to all string instruments. Popularized by its function in Capoeira, it is used in many popular music genres today.

== Wind instruments ==
Agwara
A side-blown horn made from a cow's horn. Almost exclusively used for communication and giving signals.

Amakondere (Amakondeere)
A horn or trumpet made from wood or a cow/antelope horns; Often used for crowning/coronation ceremonies.

Eng'ombe
A side-blown horn similar to the Amakondere, but used for hunting. Played by several hunters in harmony.

Endere
Called an Omukuri by the Kiga, and Akalere by the Soga, a versatile flute that comes in various sizes to produce different sounds. Can be played solo, accompanied by other instruments, or in an ensemble; ensembles consist of the kiwuwa (the largest flute), the enkoloozi (the second largest), the entengezi (the second smallest), and the entengo (the smallest).

Enkwanzi
A panpipe composed of various flutes in a row, ordered by size and bound together, often using string.
