= Ekitaguriro =

Ugandan cultural dance from Ankole kingdom

Ekitaguriro (Ankole Cow Dance)
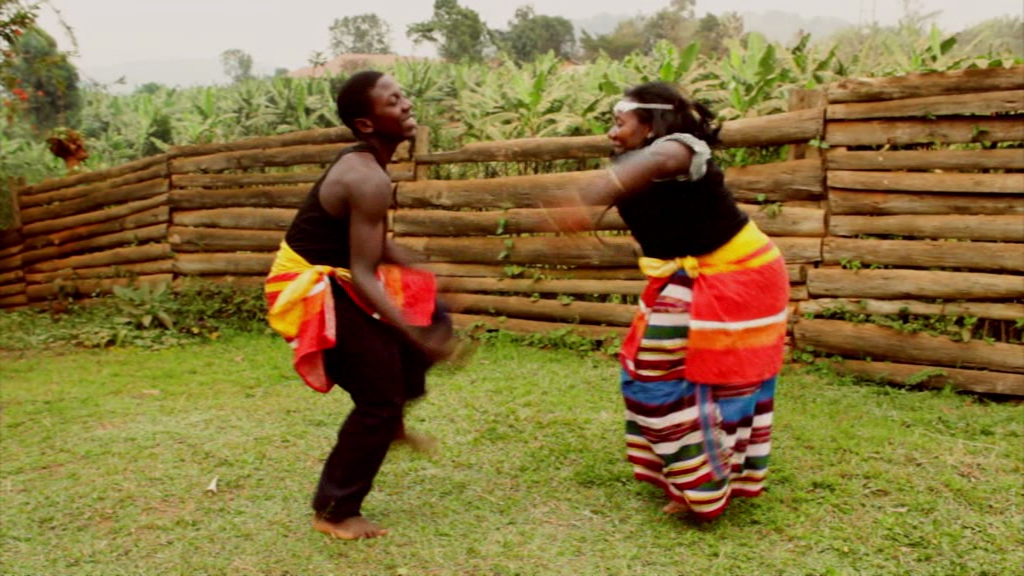
- A man and woman dancing Ekitaguriro
- Native name: Ekitaguriro
- Genre: African Traditional dance
- Origin: Ankole Kingdom

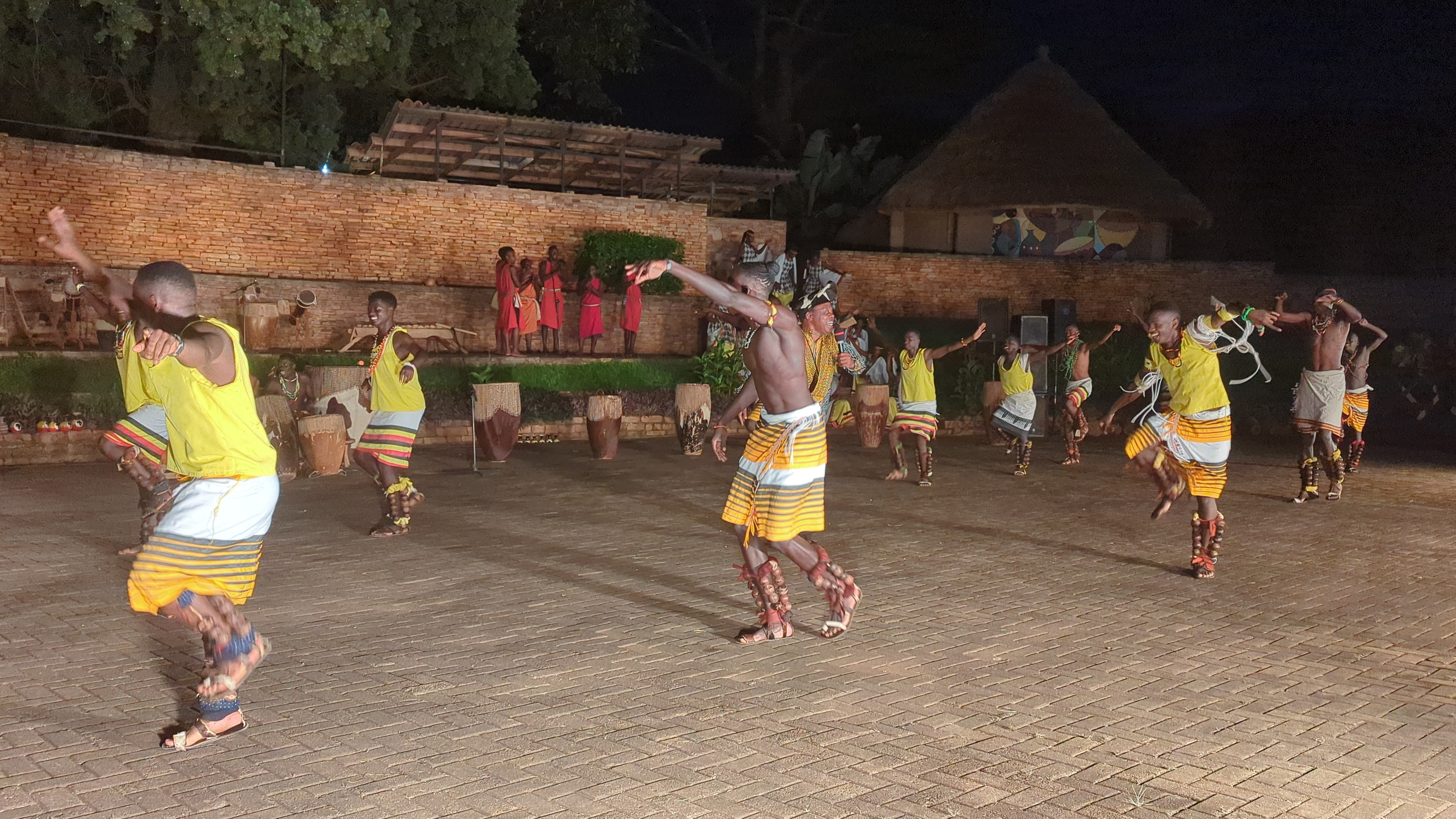
Ndere Troupe performing the Ekitaguriro Cultural dance

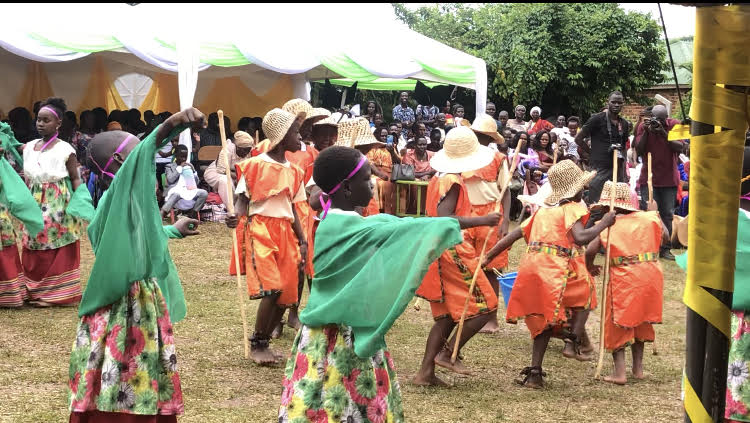
Kids performing Ekitaguriro

Ekitaguriro aka Cow Dance is a traditional dance originating from Nkore or Ankole region which is located in the South Western Uganda. It is a celebratory dance that is performed by both men and women as an expression of gratitude for their cattle and to showcase local prosperity such as birth, marriage and abundant harvest. It is an integral part of social gatherings and events in the region, symbolizing the deep-rooted cultural significance of cattle in the community.

== History ==
The Ankole kingdom came into existence through the amalgamation of the Nkore kingdom with the smaller chiefdoms of Sheema, Buhweju, and Igara. Ankole kingdom was further divided into two distinct factions, namely, the Bahima (consisting of nobles and pastoralists) and the Bairu (comprising agriculturalists and peasants). The region of Ankole gave birth to the traditional Ekitaguriro dance, which is performed by both men and women. This dance serves as a means to convey narratives, communicate essential cultural knowledge, celebrate abundant harvests, and mark significant life milestones such as birth and marriage.

== Performance ==
It begins with "Okwevuga," a form of poetry performed by men, where they narrate their life's achievements. This is followed by dancing, where the men imitate the movement of cows walking by stepping from one leg to another. Meanwhile, the women gracefully sway from side to side, spreading their hands across and above their heads to represent the long-horned cattle. During the dance, both men and women wear traditional dancewear called 'bitambi' or 'lessu.' The dancers tightly tie this cloth around their waist and drape a lighter cloth around their shoulders. The women also adorn themselves with African-themed jewelry. The men enhance their outfit by adding shackle-like beads, which draw attention to their foot movements and complement the sounds of the 'Kitaguriro' dance. The sounds are produced using flutes, Engalabi, shakers, drums and also clapping of the hands.
