= Omukuli =

Type of flute found in Uganda

The omukuli, also known as Omulele, Endere, Omuyingiro or an African Flute, is a type of flute found in Uganda. It is played both as a solo and accompaniment instrument. It is made out of a variety of materials that have a square hole chipped out of one of the ends. It has finger holes that help in playing different pitches and melody.

The player directs a stream of air over the sharp rim or on top of the pipe. It has a pentatonic scale, sol, la, do, re, mi, or do, re, mi, sol, la. Endere is tuned on the xylophone key since the xylophone is omnipresent throughout Uganda.

== See also ==
- Adungu
- Janzi
- Ebiyenge
- Endege
- Endingidi
- Endogo
- engoma
