= Bigwala =

Genre of Ugandan ceremonial music and dance

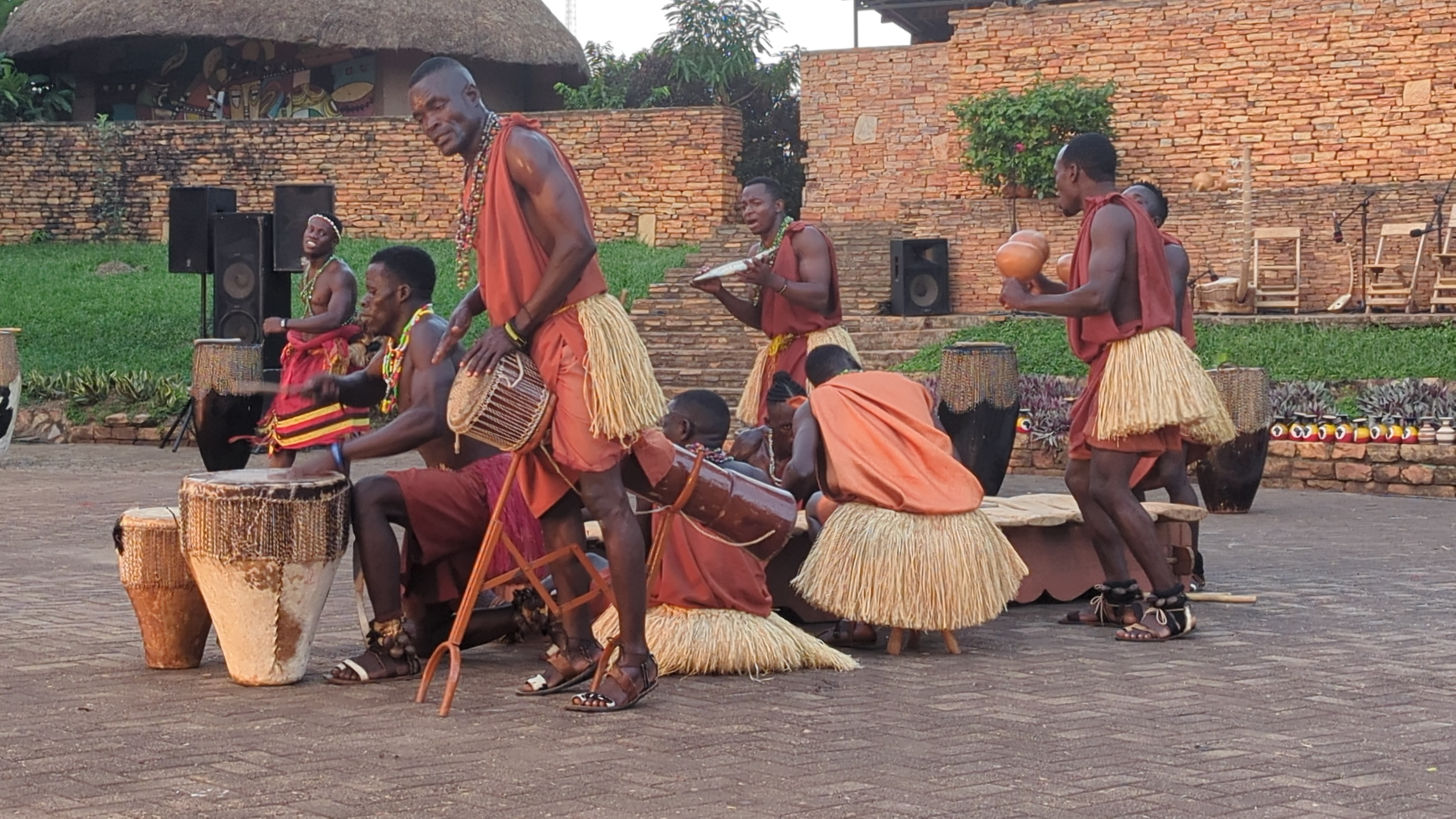
- Medium: Music and dance
- Originating culture: Busoga

Bigwala, gourd trumpet music and dance of the Busoga Kingdom in Uganda
- UNESCO Intangible Cultural Heritage
- Country: Uganda
- Reference: 00749
- Region: Africa

Inscription history
- Inscription: 2012 (7th session)
- List: Need of Urgent Safeguarding

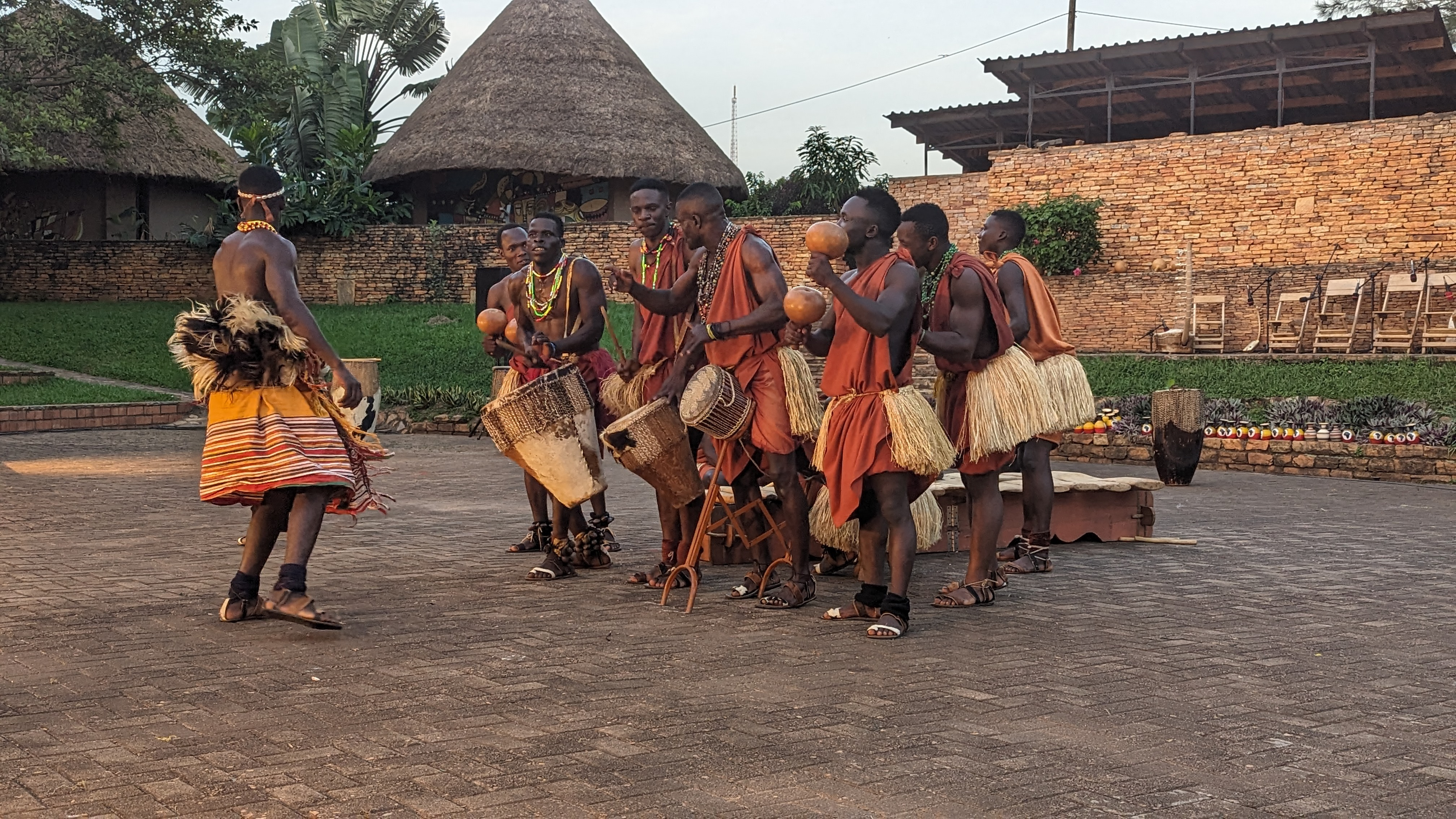
Bigwala, gourd trumpet music and dance

Bigwala is a genre of ceremonial music and dance of the Busoga Kingdom in Uganda centered around gourd trumpets.

Typically a solo trumpet is joined by four or more other trumpets, which produce a melody through playing in hocket, these are then joined by singers and then by dancers, both of which circle the instrumentalists while swaying.

Originally performed during royal celebrations such as coronations and funerals, and more recently during social occasions, but less frequently: "At present...there are only four remaining older master bearers with skills in Bigwala making, playing and dancing, and their recent transmission attempts have been frustrated by financial obstacles."

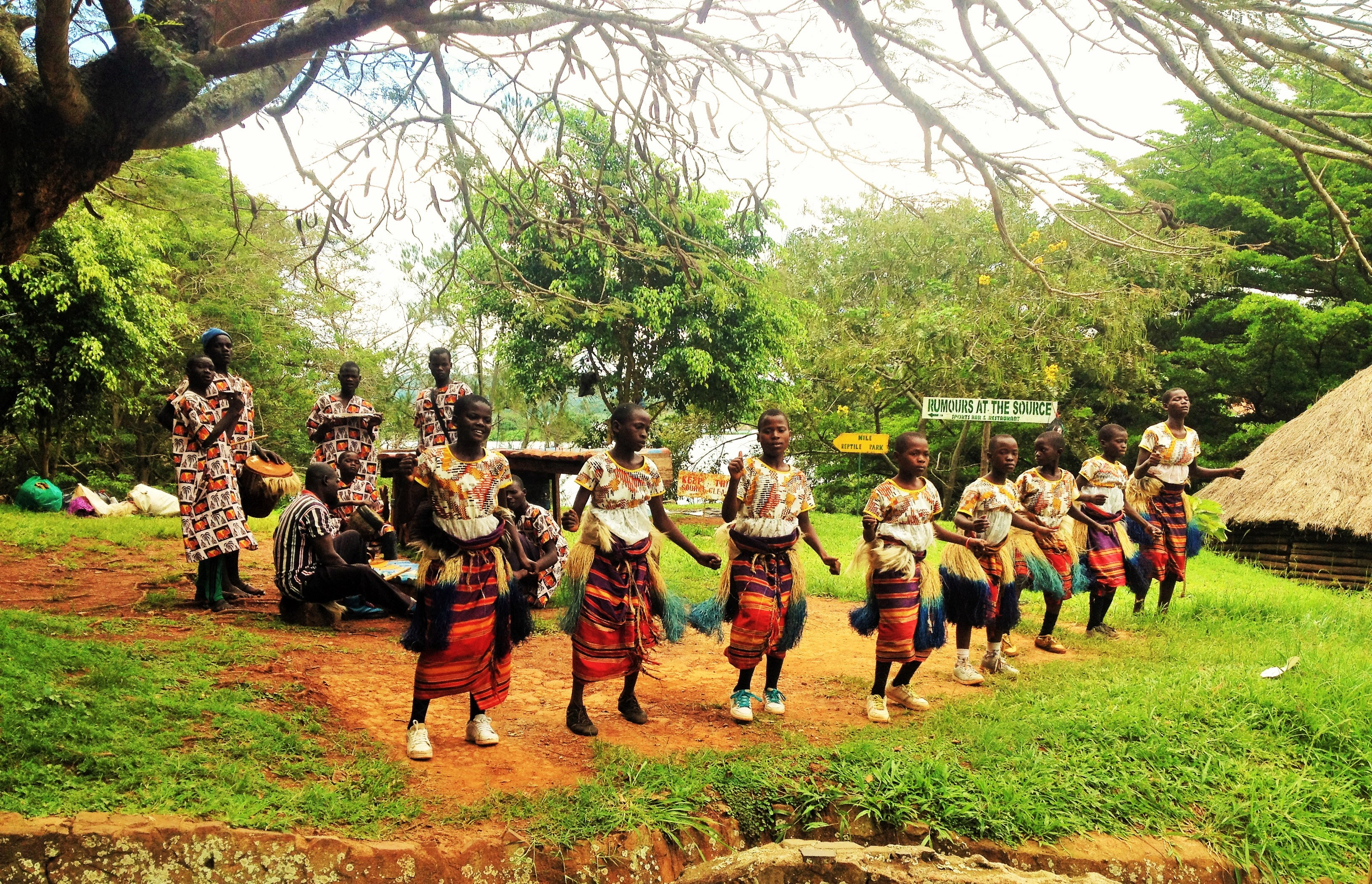
Kids dancing Bigwala

The genre contributes to Busoga unity and identity, with lyrics primarily narrating the history of the Kingdom, focusing on the King himself (a symbol of Busoga identity), as well as addressing other social issues. Godfrey Alibatya, who helped promote Bigwala to the UNESCO list, argues that, "the apparent extinction of Bigwala might contribute to the weakening of the kingship," and kingdom. David Pier argues that Alibatya is helping preserve the genre despite its obscurity, unlike most items on the list, which are cherished by the local community.

== Brief history ==
Bigwala is music and dance from the Basoga who are a Bantu speaking community from the southeastern region of Uganda. The Basoga are neighbors to various communities such as Baganda, Bagwere, Basamia, Banyoli and Banyoro. The Basoga, like most other communities, have various folk music and dance forms including Tamenhaibuga (do not break the gourd) dance, Nalufuka (the dance that pours) dance, Irongo (twin ritual) dance and Mayebe (leg rattles) dance. Bigwala is a Lusoga (language of the Basoga) term that refers to the set of five monotone gourd trumpets of different sizes. The Bigwala dance was named after these trumpets since they are played during the dance and are an indispensable part of the dance. The basics of this dance are Bigwala playing, drumming, singing and processional dancing A number of theories have emerged attempting to explain the origin of the Bigwala. Some scholars state that they originated from Egypt and were adopted by the Basoga through migration of other communities to modern day Uganda. However, one theory that is believed to be true by most is, Kintu, the first Muganda (Baganda man) brought the Bigwala to Buganda from the slopes of Mt.Elgon in Eastern Uganda. Thereafter, they spread to other communities like the Bunyoro, Busoga and Toro. Many believe that the spreading of the Bigwala was not coincidental but a result of some immigrants moving to Busoga region from Buganda in the 16th century led by Kintu himself. There is evidence to back this up such as the fact that there is significant resemblance between the Bigwala of the Busonga and Buganda kingdom. Additionally, the Basoga have clans bearing Kintu's name.

== Cultural significance ==
The Bigwala music and dance plays a crucial role in the palace and royal setting since it was used more often than not as a ritualistic dance during burials of kings and aristocrats, coronations and noble anniversaries hence stood as one of the main symbols of Busoga kingship. More recently, King Henry Wako Muloki (Busoga king) died and Bigwala players were invited to his palace and burial ground to perform. The same players were invited to perform during his coronation in 1995. Since the sovereignty of the Busoga kingdom and many others were abolished by the Ugandan government, kingship in the community exists merely as a unifying factor for the community. Bigwala also serves the function of fostering mass interaction in the community. This is through discussions and communication during preparations for the dance. Since there were no restrictions on who could own Bigwala (some communities reserved these for court consorts and emblems or regalia for royalty), everyone in the community was able to bond because Bigwala was a common means of entertainment for most people in the community. Bigwala players are obliged to perform when one of them passes on. This way, they are able to show respect and encourage one another during the hard time. If the Bigwala player left behind a widow, the widow and the family is consoled using music.

== Manufacturing process of Bigwala trumpets ==
Bigwala are made from Enhendo (gourds; Olwendo in singular). These gourds come from plants similar to pumpkins or watermelons but they develop a long neck that smoothly curves at the end. Whoever is making the gourds has to travel searching for the gourd if they do not have their own. Once the mature Enhendo is collected, they are kept on Ekibani, which is a firewood reserve directly above the fireplace. They are kept there for about a month to dry slowly over slight heat which is the most ideal condition since placing them in direct sunlight makes the crack during the next process and produces an undesirable tone opposite of the sought after rich tone. The gourds turn from a yellow-green colour to brown and covered with soot, a sign that they are ready for the next step. The Enhendo are cut up into Ebidome (smaller pieces) according to their shape to make sure they fit into each other. The artisan uses glue made from waste of Bisimizi; a type of black ants that bore holes in dry wood or sap extracted from the Lukone tree to stick many Ebidome together until the desired length is achieved for different pitches. Once they are glued together, a rubber band or cloth is used to fasten them together so as to prevent air spaces. If the trumpets develop cracks while the glue is drying, a cloth is used to fix the crack. The artisan then bores holes using a knife on the sides of the smallest Ebidome to make a mouthpiece. A slightly bigger piece is fixed on the small end. The lowest trumpet is made first and is used as a guide for tuning the subsequent trumpets in order of pitch starting from the lowest to the highest. The trumpets are pitched by adding or trimming of Ebidome. They are tuned to the pentatonic scale and the notes are estimated to be F, G, A, C and D.

== Components of Bigwala ensemble ==
The Bigwala ensemble contains five trumpets of different pitches, five drums of different pitches other melodic instruments and singers. The five trumpets are side blown and play a single tone. Each of them has a name relating to its size and role. The biggest and deepest trumpet is Enhana which plays the lead role and comes from the Lusoga word Okwana meaning to yell. It usually comes in with a strong beat and can be in quadruple or triple time and can be used to usher in the soloist of the performance. The next trumpet that is slightly higher in pitch is Empala, followed by Endhasasi, then Endesi. The smallest and highest in pitch is Endumirizi. The trumpets may share pitches that correspond to the syllables of the words of a song hence completing the music. Sometimes the flute and tube fiddle are added to enrich the themes played by the aerophone section. The aerophones may play syncopated rhythms. The five drums that accompany the Bigwala include; Engoma enene meaning big drum. It is the deepest drum and plays the basic beat of the performance. The next drum is Omuugabe which is the long drum, followed by Endyanga the short drum then Mbindimbindi the medium size drum. Lastly, Enduumi which is the small drum. These drums basically ornament the basic beat played by the big drum. The other melodic instruments that may be included in a Bigwala ensemble include; Embaire (xylophones), Enkwanzi (panpipes), Endere (flute), Endongo (lamellaphone), Endingidi (tube fiddle), Entongooli (lyre). They are used to added texture to the performance. The singing is in call and response style and often ornamented by ululations and yodeling. Short, repetitive and improvised text are the norm. The lyrics are mostly about the history of the Basoga, linking them to their past and symbolically affirming their identity.

== Dance Motifs of Bigwala dance ==
One main feature of the Bigwala dance is that it is processional or ceremonial like many trumpet dances of that region such as the Empango of the Banyoro and Agwara of the Lugbara people. Bigwala processions are mainly round the drummers who sit in the middle playing the dance rhythms and the number of people in the circle is meant to increase making the circle bigger. The dance styles can be fluid and everyone is allowed to dance as they please but the main way of dancing amongst the Basoga people is by emphasizing waist movements and alternating that with light jumping according to the speed of the procession and the beat of the drums. Sometimes the dancers will even add comic gestures to amuse and entertain themselves as well as the audience. The Basoga women tend to respond to the music before the men and they add extra embellishments and excitement as they ululate and dance vigorously as they raise their hands in the air.

== Bigwala in modern day ==
Unfortunately, Bigwala is said to be slowly vanishing as many of the older generation of people that practiced it have passed on. The new generation view it as an archaic form of dance and are not keen on learning it. Many of them lack musical skills such as manufacturing and tuning of the instruments. A few children are learning how to play the Bigwala by making a mock version of the original instrument using pawpaw leave stalks. Some scholars are researching and documenting Bigwala dance to preserve it. Some few people are still promoting and making a living off of Bigwala such as Otuli Kakolokombe; a Bigwala trumpet player, James Lugolole; the leader of 'Nambote Bigwala group whose father, Lugolole Muyaga was also a Bigwala player; Tomasi Tigaghalana a former member of Heart Beat Troupe of Africa and Ndhote cultural group who are Bigwala performers; Arthur Musulube who was a National Inspector of Schools in charge of music and travelled around Busoga teaching music and adjudicating school festivals; Sulayi Maganda Kifembe a Bigwala player and member of Lugolole group; Kasadha Myenge Kakaire who is a Bigwala player.

== See also ==
- Busoga
- UNESCO Intangible Cultural Heritage Lists
- Music of Uganda
- Engalabi
