= Omubanda =

End-blown flute native to Uganda.

The omubanda is a type of end-blown flute native to Uganda.

It is generally made of bamboo or reed, with a notch cut into the end and three or four finger-holes.

== See also ==
- Ebinyege
- Endege
- Endingidi
- Endongo

== Sources ==
- Digitalisatie van het Etnomusicologisch Klankarchief van het Koninklijk Museum voor Midden-Afrika / Digitization of the Ethnomusicological Sound Archive of the Royal Museum for Central Africa
