= Lugbara music =

Lugbara music refers to music performed in Lugbara. It can be a folk song, musical proverb or modern pop music. The general term for music in Lugbara is ongo.

== Traditional Lugbara musical instruments ==
Lugbara music can be performed using various traditional instruments. Adungu is a multi-stringed and bow-arched wooden instrument that is usually covered with animal hide at the base and made in various sizes, the smaller ones are handheld while the bigger ones rest on the ground or floor for easy play. Most tribes in Northern Uganda use it. Agwara is a local trumpet. Guke, a trumpet is used by men and boys in most of their dance. Luru is the Lugbara end blow trumpet made from a bottle shaped gourd. Mare is the side-blown trumpet made from a gourd and a wooden tube. It is blown through the hole in the gourd with the wooden tube pointing downward or under the left arm. Bees wax is smeared inside the gourd which is wetted before it is played, only at death dances. Naito is the special drum used in union with this funeral trumpet, but the general Lugbara name for a drum is ari.

== Lugbara dances ==
There are various kinds of Lugbara dances. Agwara is a dance from the Lugbara and Kebu in the West Nile, bordering the Congo and the Sudan. The dance got its name from agwara, a local trumpet. The men play these horns as the women dance. Duluka which means 'dance' in Nubian language, is considered another Lugbara dance, a community and tourist attraction where music can even be played on banana stems. Gaze is a traditional dance of the Lugbara people. This youthful dance reflects the transition of the bodily movements into the style of their neighbors in the Congo and is spreading across Uganda. Mbiri is known among the Madi. Nambi is performed mostly by young people during traditional marriage. Oseke is for the Kebu. Otwenge which literally means 'elbow' is another folk dance among the Kebu and Lugbara. It involves the raising of elbow joints, also performed by Alur. Costumes used in these dances include animal skins, feathers, grass skirts and shells.

== Modern Lugbara pop music ==
With the advent of radio technology and music videos, Lugbara music has grown steadily. Songs are composed regularly with two or more verses and a chorus accompanied by foreign instruments such as guitars, pianos and mixers. Gospel in Lugbara has always had a widespread presence but other foreign genres like hip hop and reggae have also been incorporated. The growth has witnessed the emergence of producers like Papa Muzamil, Joshman Perfection, Wise Touch Kumapeesa, Ghamille Pro; production studios like Audio Wave, Chuchu Records, (Papa's) Jomic, Swag Beat Records, Malcolm Records, Wise Records, New Orleans Studio, F-Records, Fireworks Films, Benchmark Films, Bajack Entertainment, Thunder Films plus music stars like Leku Culture, Innocent Nyakuta, Leila Chandiru, (UK-based) Betty & Gladys, Marteen, Daniel Kaweesa, among others Ginuham, Ragga Python, Loveson Controlla, Pingoman, Fingerman, Dogman, Lady Abiria, P.I.G. (Perfect In the Game), Ras(ta) P., Jack P., PCY, Gbara Spoken, LMB Raggs, Fat A, J*Hope Band, Gospel Armour Ministries, Ben Ayikobua, D2G (Dedicated 2 GOD), King Weeda(h), Van Smokey, Lady J, Fify Hafy, Trisha, Sticka, Black Harmony, J.M. Kennedy, Rappa Blutit, Monopoly(bad character), Jackie Chandiru and many others. Arua is literally the centre of modern Lugbara music played daily on local media like Arua One, Radio Pacis, Nile FM, Access FM, Voice Of Life among others which reach neighboring places including Nebbi, Gulu and Congo too. The internet through websites like Facebook and YouTube is also another exploited avenue.

== See also ==
- Amakondere
- Culture of Uganda
- Uganda Museum
- World music
