= Ugandan Callabash =

Plant locally grown in Uganda

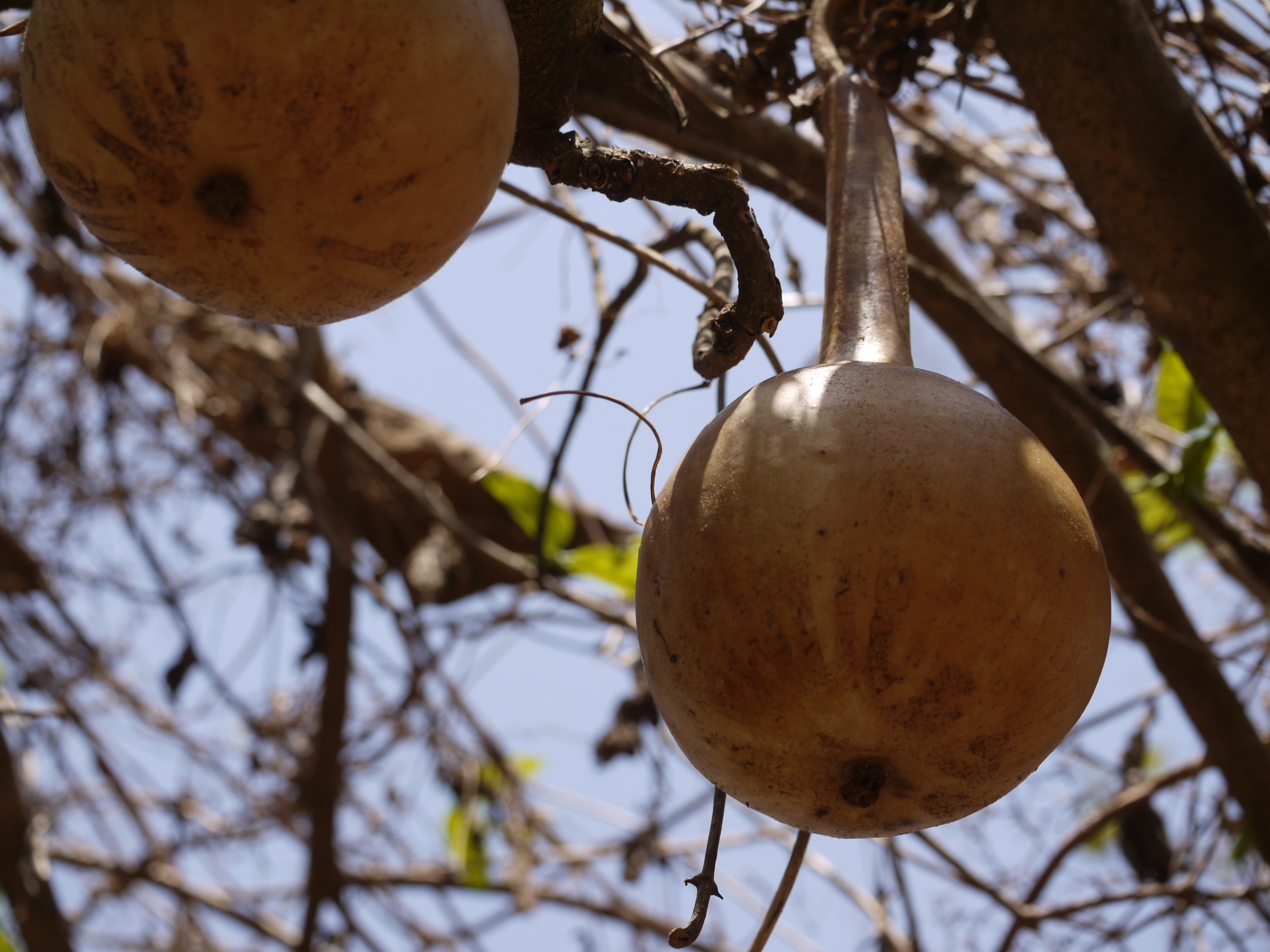
Dry Calabash On a Tree.

Calabash is a traditional plant locally grown in many parts of Uganda. Its a non-food plant that produces several fruits of different sizes. The biological name of this plant is Lagenaria siceraria. Once harvested, its left to dry and is mainly used for traditional purpurses like dancing during traditional weddings, crafted as musical instruments by some tribes in their traditional dances for example the Bigwala, Baganda, Acholi (Bwola dance), preserving milk, harvesting milk cream, and also used by traditional healers. Calabash is a symbolic cultural item that many Ugandan tribes use for different purposes.

== Significance ==
In Uganda, Calabash is important in many aspects of life. For instance in Northern Uganda, its used for various reasons among which include; providing shade for babies in dry seasons especially in Lango and Acholi, Teso, Karamoja and Alur communities, sold for income generation, used for decoration in homes and cultural institutions. Its significant in symbolizing the heritage passed from generation to generation. Culturally, the Calabash was used as a signal to call community members to a village meeting for unity. It was drummed using metallic strings for its sound to reach longer distance. To this present day, The calabash is still used for many traditional functions and tourism. Also, witch doctors use it to perform rituals at different capacities.

== Western Uganda ==
In western Uganda region, calabash is used for processing local butter or ghee and as well used to store milk for a longer period of time. This was a traditional method of preservation and kept till present day. The calabash in some cases are also used as utensils for eating food or drinking tea and water in some communities. It plays a significant role in providing alternatives for families.
