= Music of the Comoros =

The Comoros is a group of islands in the Indian Ocean, mostly an independent nation but also including the French territory of Mayotte. It is historically linked to both East Africa and France, and now has a strong Malagasy influence. Zanzibar's taarab music, however, remains the most influential genre on the islands, and a Comorian version called twarab is popular. Leading twarab bands include Sambeco and Belle Lumière, as well as singers including Chamsia Sagaf and Mohammed Hassan.

== Instruments ==
Comorian instruments include the 'oud and violin, the most frequent accompaniment for twarab, as well as gabusi (a type of lute) and ndzendze (a box zither), and the msondo drum. Sega music from nearby Mauritius and Réunion is also popular. The primitive oboe, the ndzumara, is now nearly extinct.

== Musicians ==
Modern musicians include Abou Chihabi, who composed the Comorian national anthem and who is known for his reggae-tinged pan-African variety music, reggae/zouk/soukous fusionists like Maalesh and Salim Ali Amir, Nawal, Ali Saïd Achimo who resides in Paris, Diho, singer-songwriters and instrumentalists.

== See also ==
- Abdou Baco
