= African fiddle =

Bowed string instrument

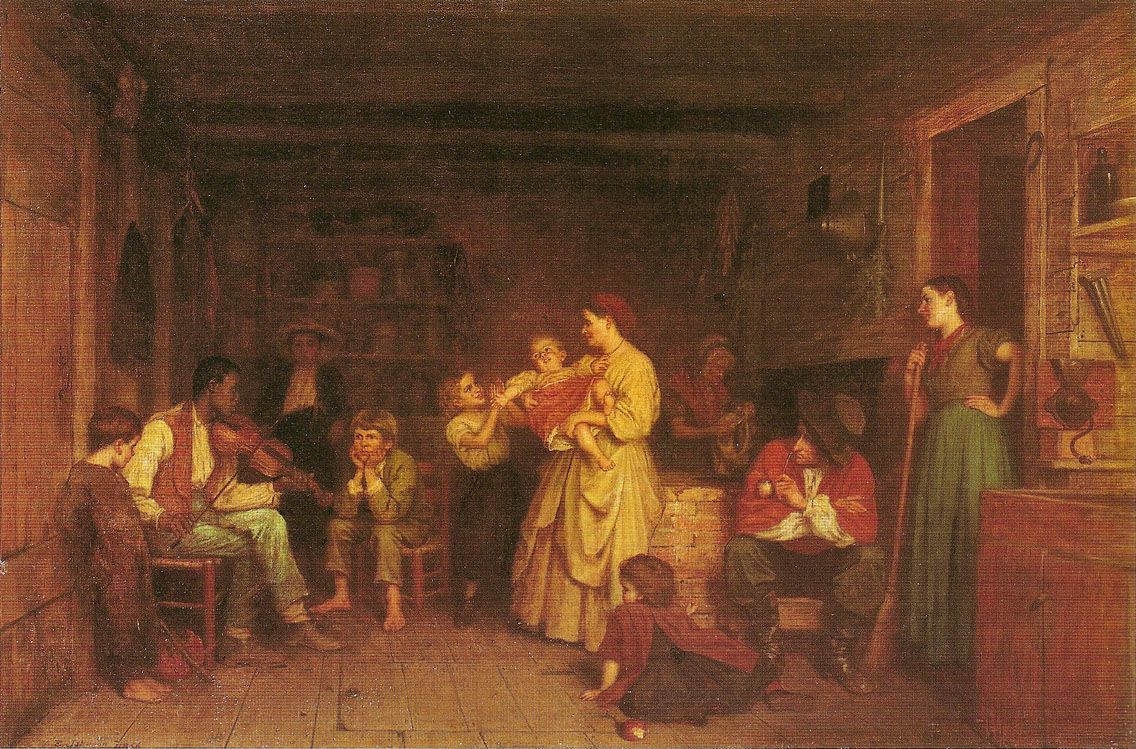
Eastman Johnson - Fiddling His Way

The term African fiddle may be applied to any of several African bowed string instruments.

== Instruments ==
Luo orutu
Luo orutu, or simply "orutu", is the one-stringed fiddle of East Africa. It is typically accompanied by Nyatiti lyre, Bul drums, the Nyangile sound box, Ongeng'o metal rings, Asili flute, and the Oporo horn.
Gongey
Gonjey music is found amongst the Dagomba people of Northern Ghana, which is in West Africa and is known to the West through modern proponents such as Kenge Kenge and the ethnomusicological archival activities of Nana Kimati Dinizulu, son of the late Nana Opare Dinizulu. According to published archival footage Talensi people who are located in the Upper Eastern Region of Ghana and in Burkina Faso. The gonje is constructed from "a gourd, lizard skin, stick and... a horsehair bow".
"Fiddle tube"
The so-called "fiddle tube" of Uganda is also referred to as "endingidi".

== Ethnomusicology ==
Self-described "culture bearer" Jacqueline Cogdell DjeDje of the University of California, Los Angeles broke new ground in ethnomusicology with her study of "fiddle" music of the Luo of Kenya. Citing Kwame Anthony Appiah, she rejects "nativist nostalgia . . . largely fueled by that Western sentimentalism so familiar after Rousseau". This is consistent with trends which urge caution when introjecting cultural stereotypes. Following her earlier academic studies, she released Fiddling in West Africa Touching the Spirit in Fulbe, Hausa, and Dagbamba Cultures in 2008.

== Contemporary African fiddle music ==
Noise Khanyile & the Jo'burgm C is a Johannesburg, South Africa based ensemble produced by West Nkosi that has been critically acclaimed. They exhibit a sophisticated multiply layered tapestry of Zulu inspired sound on his 1989 release Art of Noise.

=== Moses Mchuno ===
Moses Mchuno's township jive track incorporates fiddle and traditional Soweto singing.

== See also ==
- Ali Farka Toure
- Bhundu Boys
- Four Brothers
- Juldeh Camara

== Additional scholarly resources ==
- Makubuya, James. 2000. "Endingidi (Tube Fiddle) of Uganda: Its Adaptation and Significance among the Baganda." The Galpin Society Journal 53:140–155.
- Euba, Akin. 2001. “Issues in Africanist Musicology: Do We Need Ethnomusicology in Africa?” In Proceedings of the Forum for Revitalizing African Music Studies in Higher Education, edited by Frank Gunderson, pp. 137–139. Ann Arbor, Michigan: The U. S. Secretariat of the International Center for African Music and Dance, The International Institute, University of Michigan.
- Nketia, J. H. Kwabena. 2005. “Introduction: Thinking About Music in Ethnomusicological Terms.” In Ethnomusicology and African Music: Collected Papers. Volume One. Modes of Inquiry and Interpretation, compiled by J. H. Kwabena Nketia, pp. 1–20. Accra, Ghana: Afram Publications (Ghana) Ltd.
- Nketia, J.H. Kwabena, and Jacqueline Cogdell DjeDje. 1984. “Introduction: Trends in African Musicology.” In Selected Reports in Ethnomusicology. Vol. 5. Studies in African Music, edited by J. H. Kwabena Nketia and Jacqueline Cogdell DjeDje, pp. ix–xx. Los Angeles: UCLA Program in Ethnomusicology, Department of Music.
- Noll, William. 1997. “Selecting Partners: Questions of Personal Choice and Problems of History in Fieldwork and Its Interpretation.” In Shadows in the Field: New Perspectives for Fieldwork in Ethnomusicology, edited by Gregory F. Barz and Timothy J. Cooley, pp. 163–188. Oxford and New York: Oxford University Press.
