= Ndzendze =

Comorian box-zither-type musical instrument

- Other names: Dzendze, dzenzé
- Classification: Box-zither

Related instruments
- Valiha

The ndzendze, dzendze, or dzenzé is a Comorian musical instrument, of the box-zither type, possibly derived from the Malagasy valiha. The musician Soubi (Athoumane Soubira) of Mwali is recognized as a master of the instrument.
