= Rakatak =

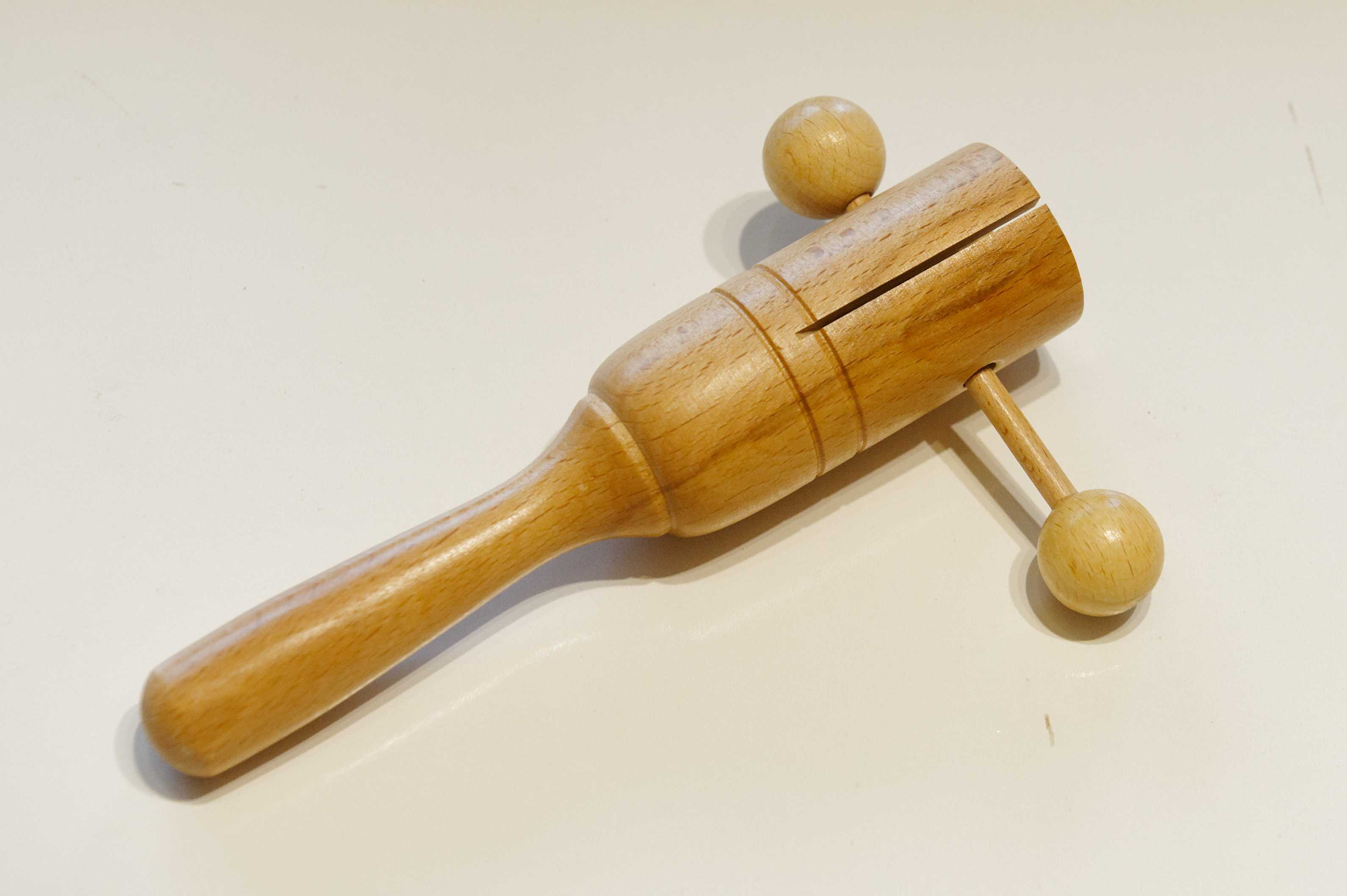
A Rakatak made of beech wood

The Rakatak is a percussion instrument that originates from Ghana. The rakatak is made of several calabash gourd shells attached to a long, narrow wooden shaft joined to the longer main wooden handle at a 90-degree angle. Rakataks are often used in traditional African ... music.
