= Trough zither =

Group of African stringed instruments

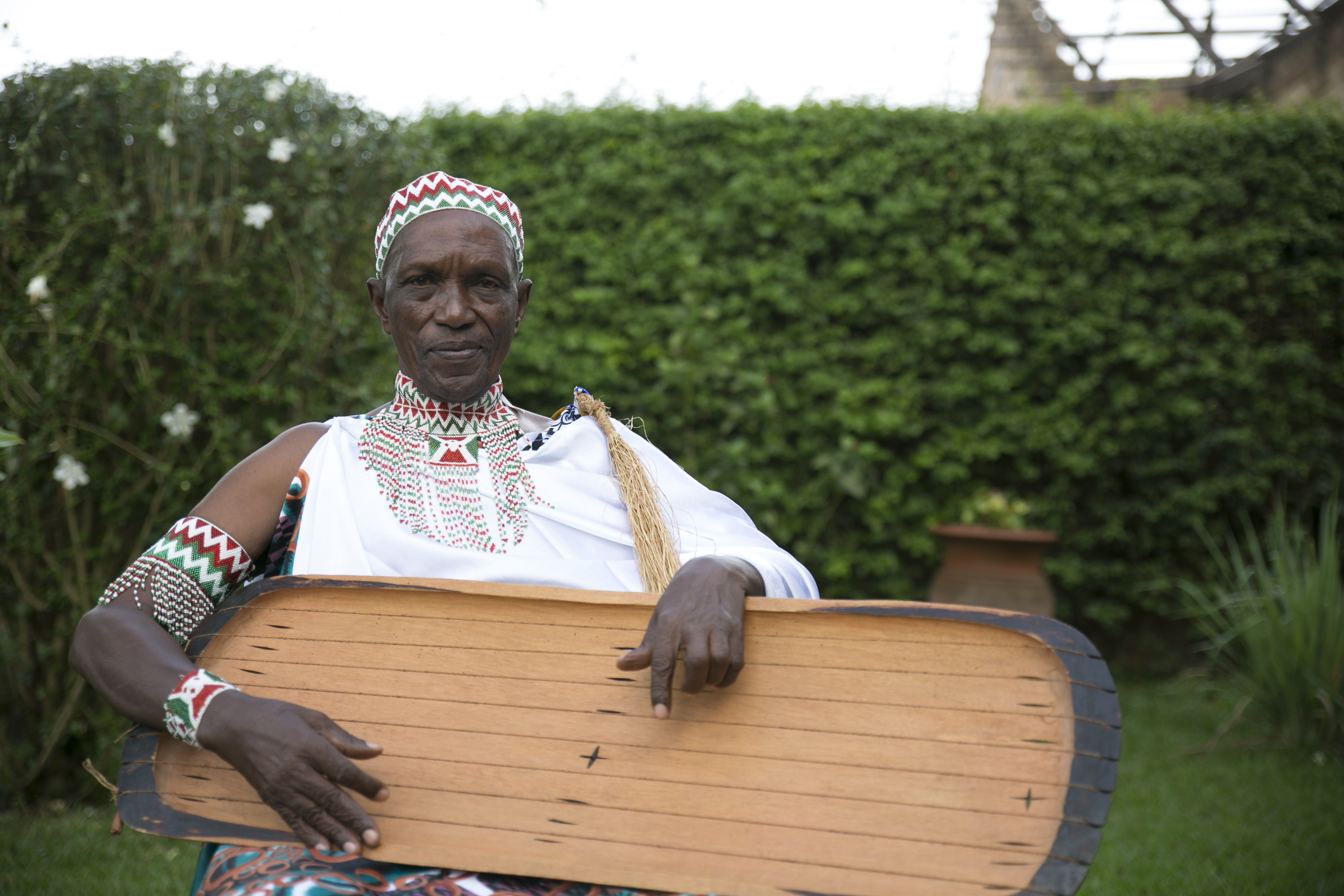
- Inanga player Torobeka Joseph from Burundi. Trough zither type A, using Wegner's classification.

String instrument
- Hornbostel–Sachs classification: 315.1 (without resonator) or 315.2 (with resonator) (Trough zithers. Instruments in which strings are stretched across the mouth of a trough.)
- Developed: Modern examples come from Africa, especially the Great Lakes Region of East Africa.

Related instruments
- x; y

Trough zithers are a group of African stringed instruments or chordophones whose members resemble wooden bowls, pans, platters, or shallow gutters with strings stretched across the opening. A type of zither, the instruments may be quiet, depending upon the shape of the bowl or string-holder. Sound is often amplified with the addition of a gourd resonator. Instruments have been classed into five different types, based on shape.

The resonator is most commonly a gourd, but tin cans have also been used.

An instrument of East and Central Africa, mainly Rwanda and Burundi. Parts of the Democratic Republic of Congo and Tanzania as well, near the borders with Rwanda and Burundi.

== Types ==
Ulrich Wegner (1984) divides the East African shell zithers into five groups according to their shape.

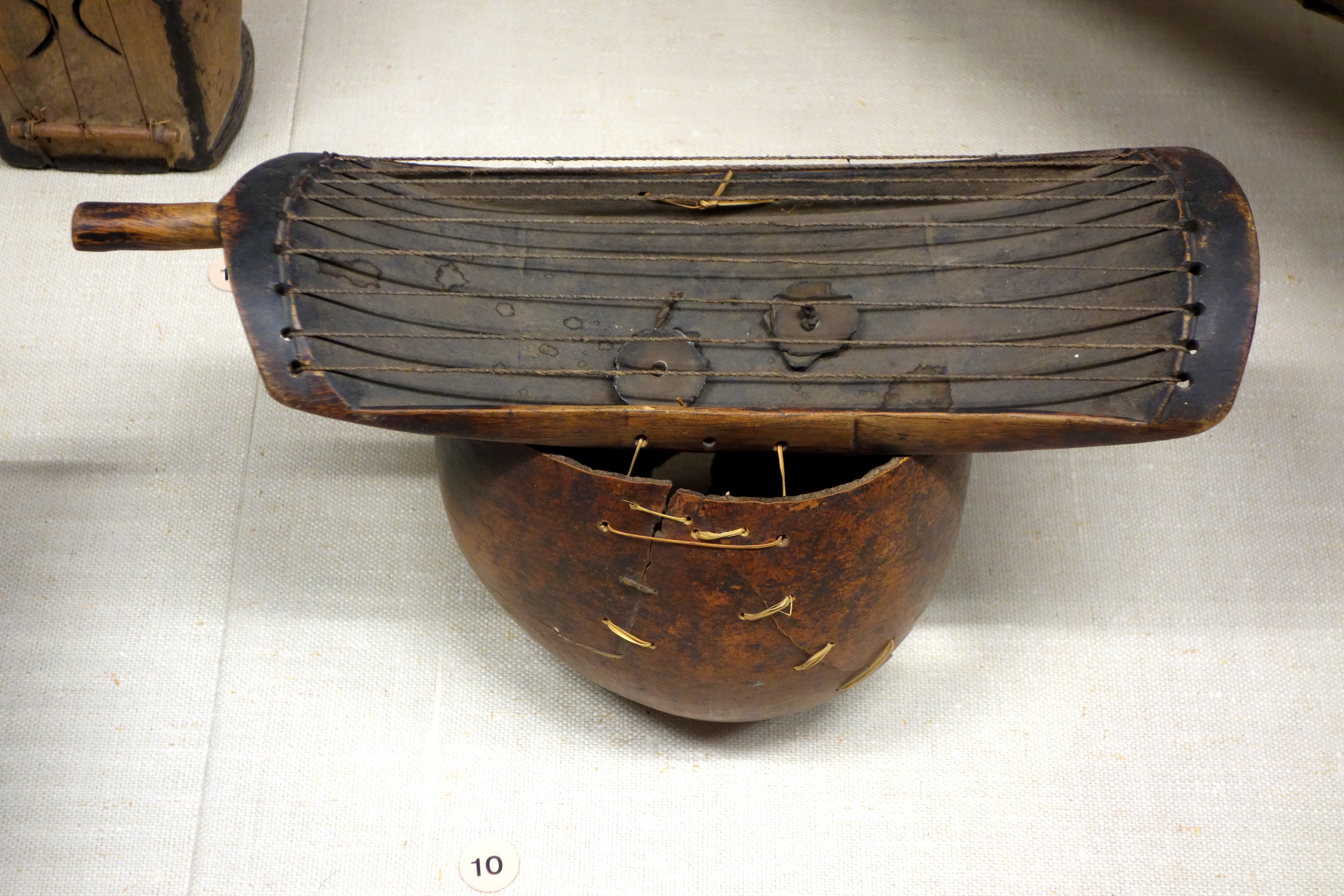
Enganga. Type A six-string zither tied to a calabash. Shi language group around Bukavu in eastern Congo. Royal Museum for Central Africa

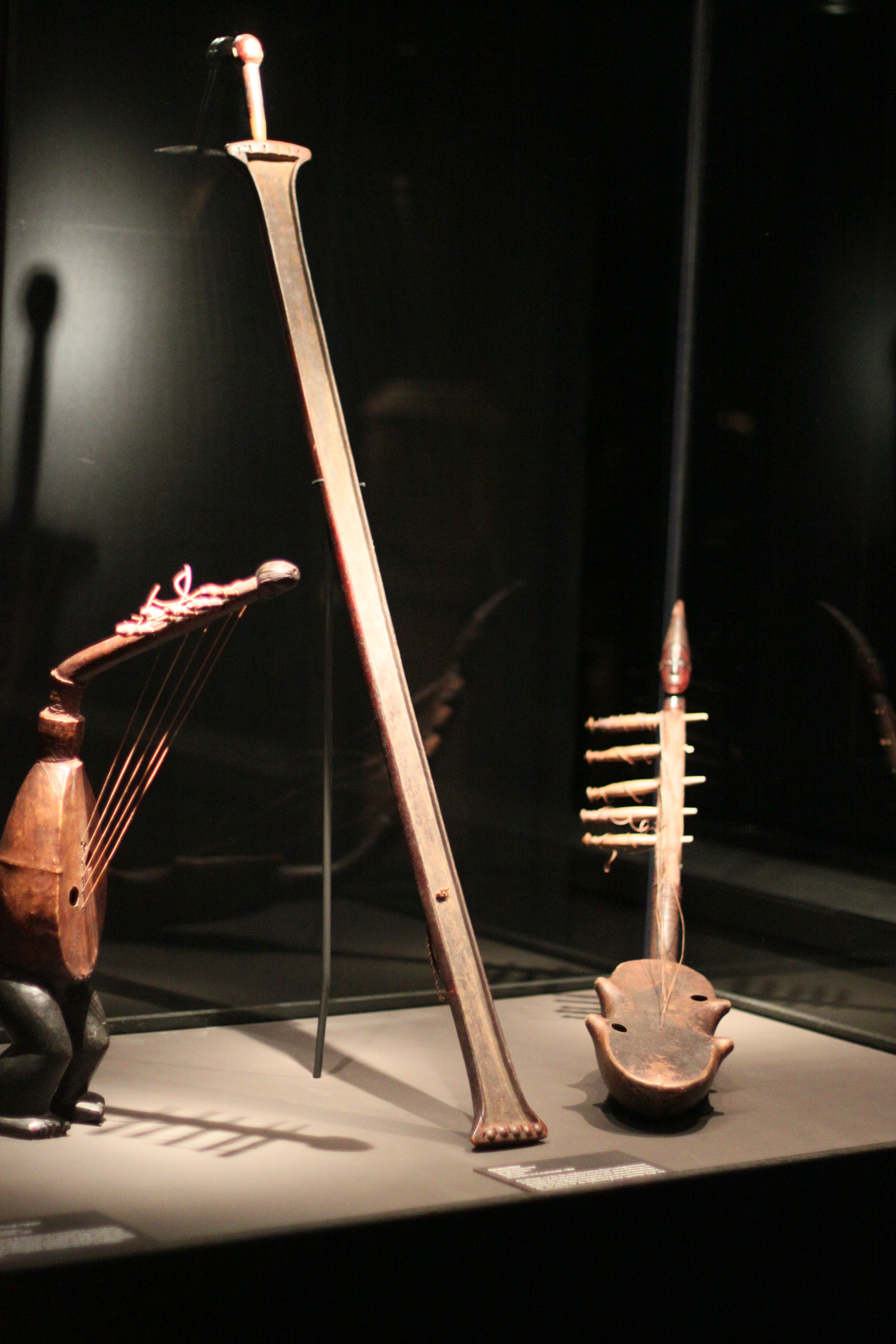
Center: six-string bowl zither (ligombo) of type B from the Nyamwezi in Central Tanzania. Missing gourd resonator.

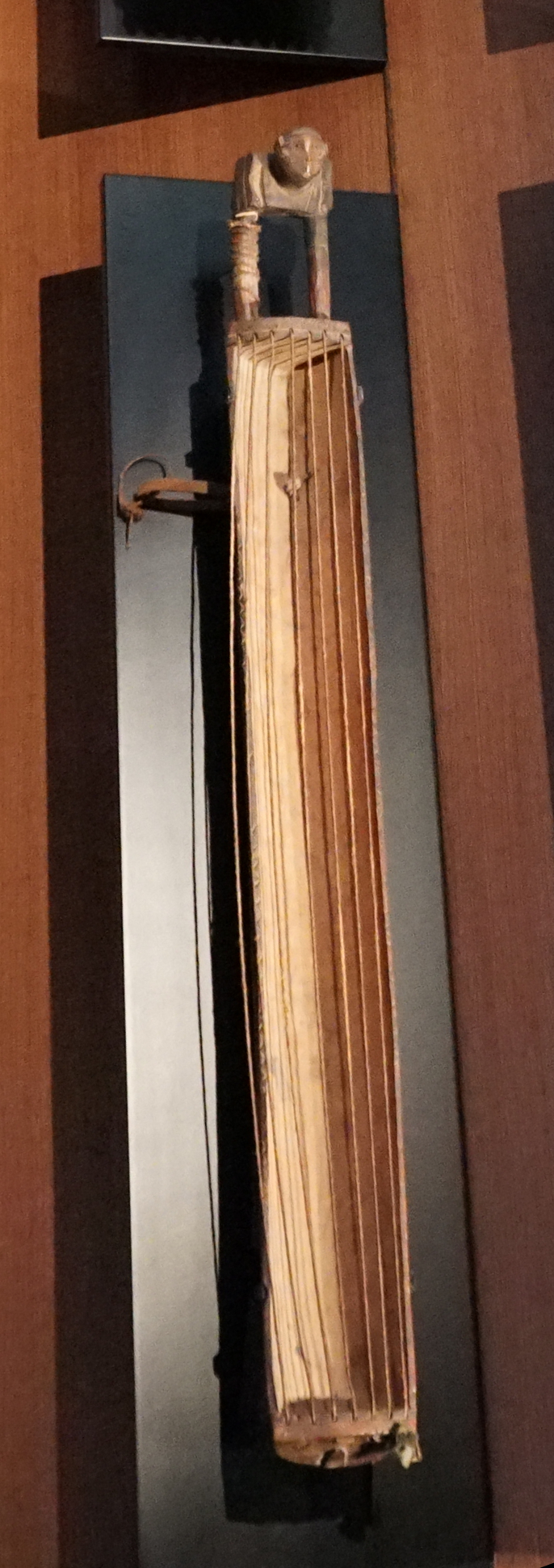
unnamed type C trough zither from Rwanda

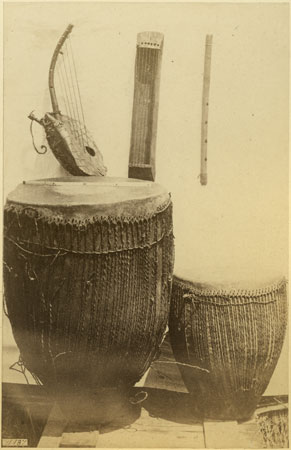
South Sudan or Northern Uganda. Acholi people, type D trough zither (center back), arched harp (left), unnamed flute (right). Circa 1880. The zither is a nanga or possibly kinanda.

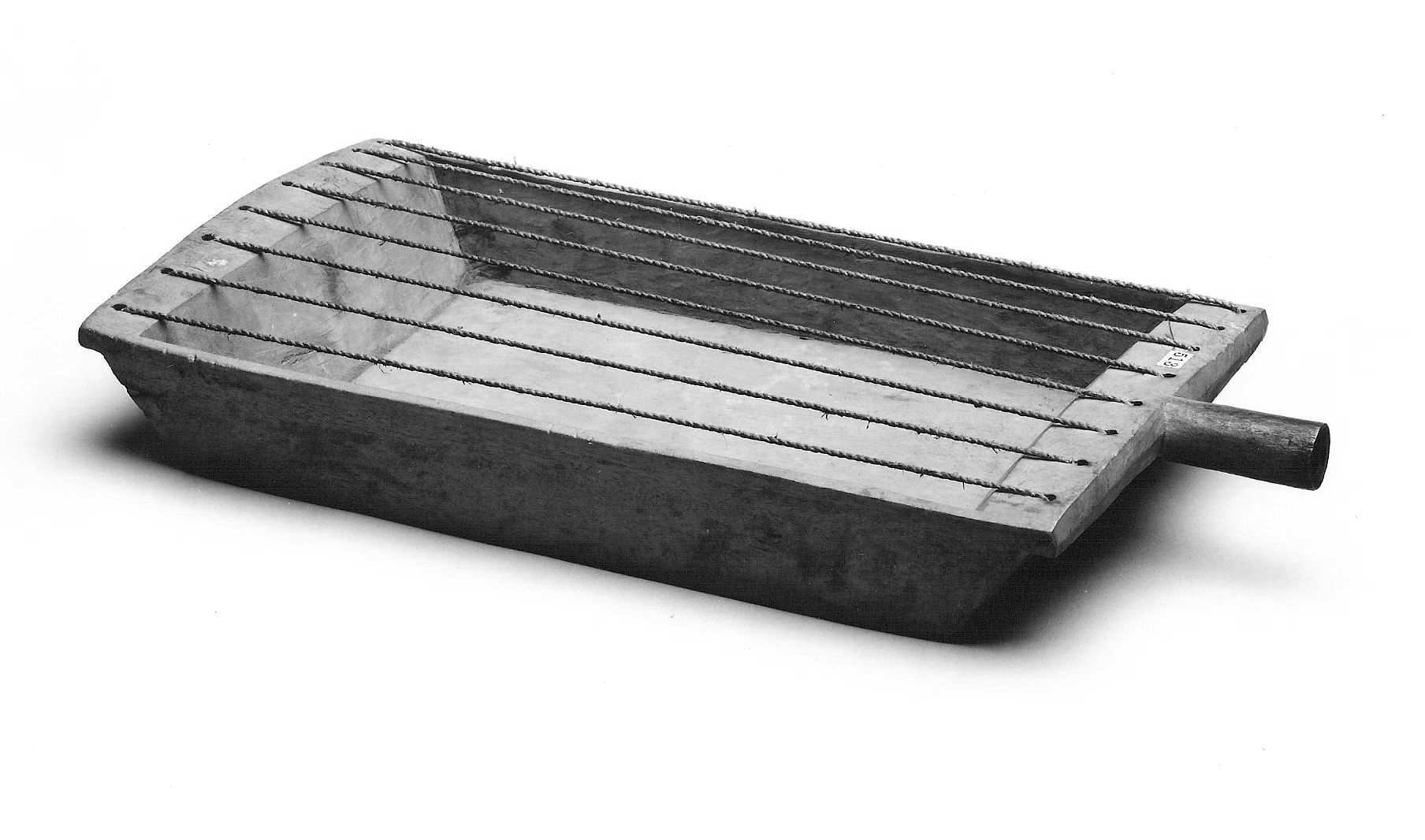
Unidentified type E trough zither, Democratic Republic of Congo, late 19th century. 13 x 6 in. (33 x 15.2 cm). Type E.

=== Type A ===
The inanga of the intermediate lake area with a wide, flat bowl shape and low edges belongs to type A. In this case, a single string of strings is run continuously around notches on the rounded narrow sides.

=== Type B ===
The ligombo of type B is characterized by a very narrow, flat shape that tapers towards the middle of the sides. The string is fed through holes on the narrow sides. Apart from the Hehe, this type comes from the Wakinga in the Njombe Region in southern Tanzania, the Sangu in the Mbeya Region in the southwest, the Bena in the Iringa Region and among the Kaguru in the eastern center of the country.

A shorter version of the ligombo with seven strings among the Safwa who live in the territory of the Sangu in the Mbeya Region is called sumbi.

=== Type C ===
Type C differs from the otherwise similar type B in that it has a deeper semi-tubular shape and straight longitudinal walls. It occurs north of the distribution area of type B especially among the Gogo in the central Tanzanian region of Dodoma, among the Turu in the Singida Region, with the Sandawe in the Kondoa District and the Isanzu in Iramba district (Singida Region).

=== Type D ===
Type D is again long and narrow, but has a flat bottom and straight side walls at right angles to it. Its distribution area is along the east coast with the Zaramo and Kwere in the Pwani Region and further south with the Makonde.

=== Type E ===
Among the Makonde and Nguru (Ngulu) speakers in eastern central Tanzania, the type E with a wide rectangular bowl shape and a flat bottom was also observed.

== Playing ==
=== Inanga ===
The musician plays the inanga with both hands. The instrument is rested in the player's lap or beside them on the left side. Holding the top of the instrument with the left little-finger, the player plucks the instrument's topmost strings with the hand's other fingers. The right had plucks the bottom strings, that have the lowest notes.

Inanga Burundi of Burundi plays with a different technique. He sits the instrument on his lap facing away from him. He plays the bottom strings from the side with one hand, and reaches from above with the other to play the top strings, supporting the instrument with his forearm.

He has also been taped laying the instrument flat on a table, reaching across with both hands from the top, plucking the strings.

The instruments are not used to play chords. A rhythmic, melodic pattern is played and repeated. Singing is done over the playing. While the instruments are tuned before playing, notes can be raised while playing, by pressing down on the end of a string while plucking with the other hand.

There are traditions in each tribe for who may play the instrument. For instance, among the Kunta and Ziba, men played the instrument, while among the Hima it was women who played the instrument. Among the Kiba, men were the main musicians, but women also played the instrument.

=== Ligombo ===
A picture by Ulrich Wegner shows the Ligombo being played. The musician held the instrument so that it faced him, plucking (probably) the strings with his thumbs. The instrument's resonating gourd could also be used as a rhythm instrument; Wegner said if that the second person in the photo was "accompanying him rhythmically on the resonator" with his bare hands.

=== Nanga ===
One way the Acholi play the instrument is as a fast rhythmic instrument, laying down a repetitive melodic beat for dancers. Sitting on the ground, the musician's pluck the strings with their thumbs.

== Characteristics ==
The body or bowl of the instrument may be a shallow platter, like the Inanga; however can also be large and deep enough to be a baby's cradle. Instruments are usually made from a single price of wood with slots in the ends. Overall shape may be cylindrical or rectangular.

Strings were historically of natural materials, such as vegetable fibers or "cow sinew". One long piece of string is put through the holes or in the notches, back and forth from end to end, creating segments of individual strings.

The ends of the string may be held in place, wrapped around a wooden peg, anchoring the string. The string is tuned by tightening or loosening it; the process involves several string segments, because as a segment is adjusted, it affects those it is connected to.

The "sharp, sawtooth notches" help control the tension on the string, gripping and holding the string. Additionally, a wooden stick can be used to adjust string tension, by wedging it under strings at each end.

Some instruments have holes instead of carved notches.

Gourds may be affixed to the bottom of an instrument by tying it through holes on the side or bottom of the instrument down into holes in the gourd. The gourd acts as a resonator to improve sound. The bottom of the bowl may also have soundholes. As the zither wood dries and ages, it may crack; these cracks have been repaired by bracing the halves together with tin and nails, or by wrapping the instrument with cord and tightening the halves together.

== Distribution ==
Trough zithers are an African innovation. In East Africa they occur all over Tanzania and in the inter-lake area (between Lake Victoria, Lake Kivu and Lake Tanganyika), Uganda, Rwanda, Burundi, and eastern Congo.

== List of historical trough zithers ==
This list of trough zithers attempts to match names of known trough zithers with people or places associated with trough zithers under those names. In some cases, information is less specific than in original sources. A source might name a particular ethnicity in a particular place, but this list doesn't keep the two together. An example: the Hutu's of Rwanda are listed as playing the inanga. It is possible that not all Hutu groups everywhere play the Inanga, nor do all ethnic groups in Rwanda play the instrument.

Another consideration, names. The names on the list were recorded by people who collected the instrument in the field, or by people who bought the instrument. Accuracy might be an issue. Furthermore, if the names were recorded correctly, the name given might need to be looked at; for example a name might refer to a specific instrument or to all string instruments or to instruments in general. One group may use the same name differently than another groups. For example Ngombi can refer either to a Zande trough zither or to a harp (by the Pygmies, Mbaka, Isongo, Ngbaka, Mitshogho and Fang), a lamellaphone by the Gbandi, or a slit drum by the Boa.

Traditions change. The information here was compiled from museum collections and 20th-century books.

Vernacular name	Description	Ethnic Connections	Town / Region	Picture
Bangwe	The name bangwe is also used in Malawi for a board zither.	Mang'anja	Malawi	Malawi or Tanzania. Possibly a bangwe, late 19th century. Originally sat on gourd resonator. 17 11/16 × 4 5/16 × 1 3/4 in. (45 × 11 × 4.5 cm) (Top): Manwe board zither, (bottom) kaligo bowed lute. Yao people (East Africa), near Lake Malawi.
Enanga	Same as the inanga. Has approximately 7 strings. Pictures of the instrument show as many as 9 strings. The instrument was associated with "a wide range of oral literature genres," sung by professional singers at royal courts in Uganda. Among the Bahaya and Banyambo of Kagera, the enanga has been an instrument of professional bards, who recite epic poetry and play while the song and recite. After Tanzania's independence, and kings were abolished, patronage to the bards has ceased, and in 1983 it appeared the profession was dying out. Besides the enangas (epic poetry), singers sang ballads and ebizina songs for the common people.	Banyambo, Haya, Nande Kiga, Hima, Kunta, Ziba	Burundi Democratic Republic of the Congo Rwanda Tanzania Uganda Ankole	Enanga
Enzenze		Nande	Democratic Republic of the Congo Uganda	
Ganoon		Swahili, Ta Arab	Tanzania	
Ikivuvu	alternate name for Inanga. Associated with cult of Biheko (also known as Nyabingi) in northern Kivu. Biheko (or Nyabingi) was a princess who survived when her family was slaughtered, using magic or by miracle. The tale has given the inanga "sorcerous connotations." Through a traditional mediator (Mugirwa) who is in a trance and possessed by the spirit, citizens can ask questions of the spirit. The inanga is considered to be the ideal instrument for attracting the mind's attention through its music.	Rundi	Democratic Republic of the Congo Northern Kivu	
Indimbagazo	alternate name for Inanga Eight string version is the Indimbagazo. Inanga version has "9 or 12 strings."	Rundi	Burundi	
Inanga	The body of the inanga is carved from a long rectangular block of wood and shaped into a thin-walled boat shape or "platter." The outer dimension is 75 to 115 centimeters in length and 25 to 30 centimeters in width. The opening of the bowl is somewhat smaller due to the wide, inwardly bulging edges on the two narrow sides. 6-9 grooves are cut into the ends at equal intervals. A single string, made of gut or vegetable fibers, is pulled lengthways across the instrument through the holes and tied at the ends to wooden pegs so that several parallel strings result, which can be tuned by adjusting the tension. Changing the pitch of one "influences" the pitch of other string lengths. Tuned with "anhemitonic pentatonic scale" Not all grooves have to be used. Inanga are decorated with burnt-in geometric motifs on the sides and cross-shaped incisions in the middle of the base. The inanga is the most famous musical instrument of Burundi and is also widespread in the surrounding areas - in Rwanda, in the Kivu region in eastern Congo and in the south of Lake Victoria on the island of Ukerewe.	Bakiga Lega people, Rundi people (Burundians who speak Kirundi, Kinubi, Hutu, Tutsi Twa Pygmies	Eastern part of African Great Lakes region: Burundi, Democratic Republic of the Congo, Kivu, Rwanda Uganda (southwest)	Inanga at a wedding in Kigali, Rwanda.
Kinanda	At lead two styles: one version from the Democratic Republic of the Congo is similar to inanga. The other (from Tanzania) is similar or same instrument as Acholi's nanga.	Holoholo	Democratic Republic of the Congo	
Langa	instrument related to Inanga	Shi		
Ligombo	An approximately one meter long, slender wooden string carrier, which is thin-walled to form a flat groove. The ends are slightly wider than the middle. One long string divided into six parallel strings, fed through holes on each end. A resonator calabash is tied onto one end (about 30 mm diameter with 10 mm diameter opening). The string vibrations are transmitted to the calabash through direct contact with the string holder. The top of the instrument has a thin round extension; may be sculpted into female figure and clothed in areas where the Sukuma people live. The string cord is fixed at one end with a cross piece of wood and is tied to the stem extension at the other end. The different tensions of the individual strings is maintained by frictional resistance on the narrow loops leading through two holes. Strings were traditionally made of intestines or animal tendons.	Hehe, Wakinga, Sangu, Bena, Kaguru, Safwa, Sukuma, Zaramo	Tanzania: Njombe Region Mbeya Region Iringa Region	Ligomo, Tanzania, 19th century
Lulanga	instrument related to Inanga	Fuliru, Hutu, Shi	Democratic Republic of the Congo	
Molo	there is also a lute called a molo	Eggon	Nigeria	
Nanga	This word has been used for the ligombo. and the inanga Name used by the Acholi for their trough zither. The Acholi instrument is a rectangular instrument, about 51.5 cm (20.25 in) long with seven nylon strings. The instrument has a "bridge" at each end. Images of the modern instrument show that a wood top has been added, converting the trough zither to a box zither. There are at least two pentatonic tunings used by the Acholi.	Acholi, Banyoro Bembe	Democratic Republic of the Congo Maniema Tanzania Uganda	Acholi musical instruments, circa 1877-1880, arched harp in left, nanga trough zither center
Ngombi same as Segwirunibia	Segwirunibia is also a board zither	Zande people	Democratic Republic of the Congo	
Segaba segankuru sekgobogobo setseketseke	a bowed trough zither the trough forming a neck; a wooden body attached to a tin can resonator, with a single metal string played with a bow.	Tswana people, Pedi people	Botswana, Southern Africa	
Sumbi		Safwa	Tanzania: Mbeya Region	

== See also ==
- Ligombo on German Wikipedia
- Segankuru on German Wikipedia
