= Tadghtita =

Bagpipes from Algeria

The tadghtita is a type of bagpipe played by the Berbers of Algeria.
