= Ndzumara =

The ndzumara is a double-reed pipe, or primitive oboe (French: hautbois), played in Comorian music. The instrument is noted as almost extinct.

The instrument is also found in Mayotte, where it is described as a La flûte mahoraise en bois, NDZUMARA, fût très longtemps mal considéré par les religieux (pour des raisons obscures).
