= Ensaasi =

Ugandan percussion instrument

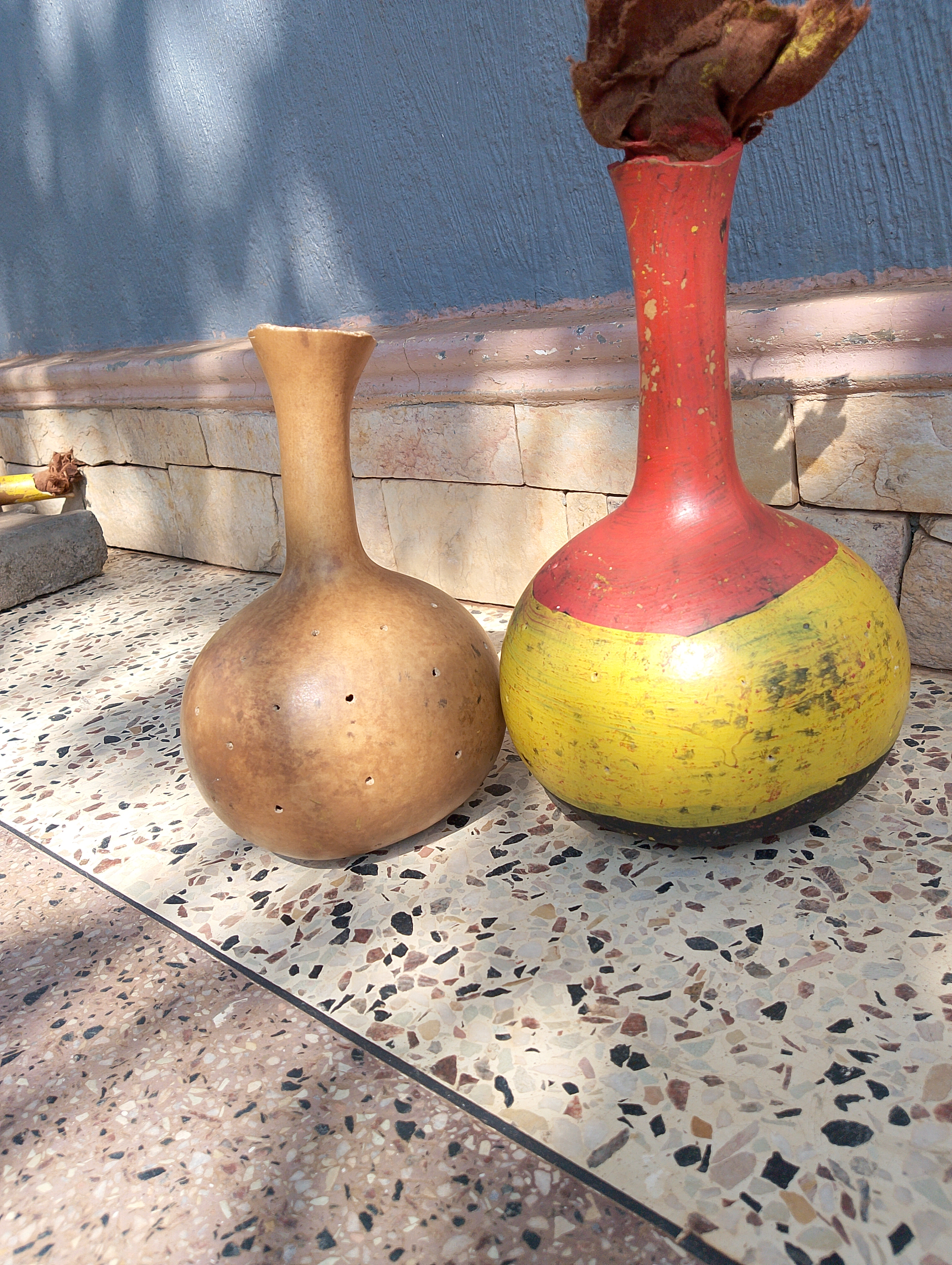
Shakers traditionally called Ensaasi in luganda language

Ensaasi, also known as Ensaasi-Enseege, are traditional Ugandan percussion instruments commonly referred to as shakers. They are idiophones, meaning they produce sound through the vibration of their entire body when shaken. These instruments are most closely associated with the Baganda people of central Uganda and the Basoga people of eastern Uganda. Ensaasi are typically made in pairs and are used to accompany other traditional musical instruments in Ugandan music and cultural performances.

== Construction and Design ==
Ensaasi are traditionally crafted from natural materials such as gourds or shells, which serve as the hollow body of the instrument. The body is filled with small objects like beads, pebble, or seeds, which create a rattling sound when the shaker is moved. Some Ensaasi are designed with stick handles for easier grip and manipulation during play. The size and shape of the gourd or shell, as well as the type and quantity of filling material, influence the tone and texture of the sound produced.

In the central, eastern, and northern regions of Uganda, Ensaasi are designed to produce a continuous sound. This is achieved by the movement of beads or pebbles from side to side within the gourd or shell as the instrument is shaken. The rhythmic patterns created by Ensaasi add a dynamic layer to traditional Ugandan music.

== Cultural Significance ==
Ensaasi are often used in ensemble performances alongside other traditional instruments such as drums, xylophones, and stringed instruments. The shakers provide a steady rhythmic foundation and enhance the overall texture of the music. In addition to their musical function, Ensaasi are sometimes used in ceremonial contexts, including dances, rituals, and community celebrations.

== Playing Technique ==
To play Ensaasi, the performer holds one shaker in each hand and shakes them in a rhythmic pattern. The motion can vary from gentle shakes to vigorous movements, depending on the desired sound and the musical context. The continuous sound produced by the beads or pebbles moving inside the gourd or shell creates a distinctive rattling effect that complements other instruments.

== Idiophones in World Music ==
As idiophones, Ensaasi belong to a broader category of instruments that produce sound through the vibration of their entire body. This category includes instruments such as maracas, tambourines, and xylophones, which are found in various cultures worldwide. Ensaasi, however, are unique to Uganda and made using locally available materials to create musical instruments.
