= Enkwanzi =

Traditional Ugandan wind instrument from Busoga sub-region

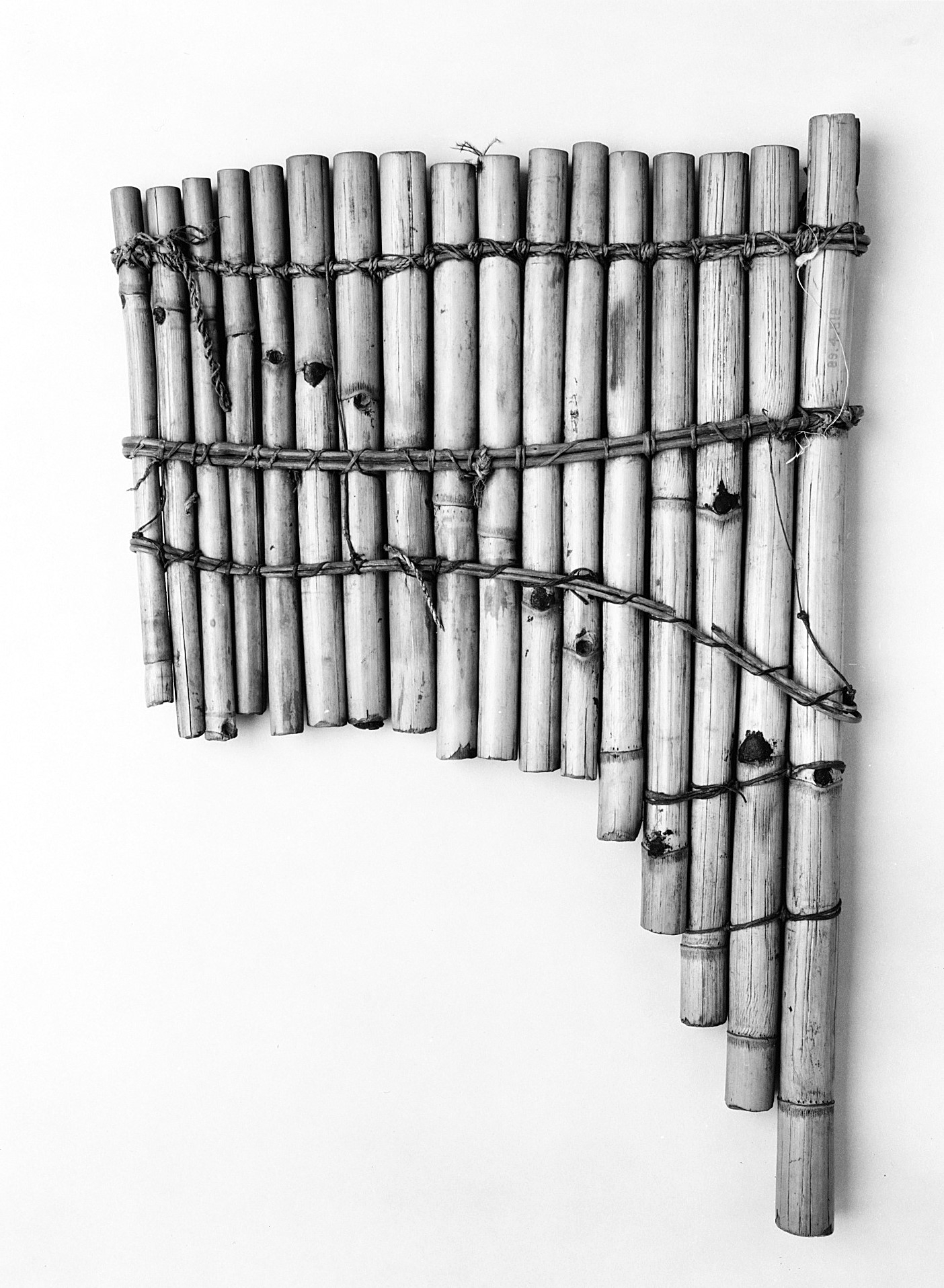
Enkwanzi (panpipe)

The enkwanzi, also known as oburere, is a traditional panpipe originating from Busoga sub-region in Eastern Uganda.

It is a wind instrument that produces soothing and melodic sounds often used in Basoga traditional music. Enkwanzi instruments are crafted from natural materials such as elephant grass or bamboo. The enkwanzi is a type of stopped flute, where the natural node of the plant material acts as a stopper at the end of each hollow tube, determining the pitch of the individual pipes. The tubes are arranged in order from the lowest to the highest pitch and are bound together with string. The open rim at the top of each tube is cut at a right angle, allowing the player to produce sound by blowing across the top, similar to the technique used when blowing across the opening of a bottle.

== Construction and design ==
The enkwanzi typically consists of at least five pipes, though larger versions with more pipes may exist. Each pipe is carefully cut to a specific length to produce a distinct pitch. The natural nodes of the bamboo or elephant grass serve as stoppers at the bottom of each tube, creating a closed end that influences the resonant frequency of the pipe. The open tops of the tubes are cut precisely to allow the player to generate sound by directing a stream of air across the rim. The pipes are then tied together in a row, forming a single instrument that can produce a range of melodic notes.

== Playing technique ==
To play the enkwanzi, the musician holds the instrument horizontally and blows across the open tops of the pipes. By moving their lips and adjusting the angle and force of their breath, the player can produce different pitches. The arrangement of the pipes from low to high pitch allows for the creation of simple melodies and harmonies. Usually, sets of enkwanzi panpipes interlock to pick out a pattern that relates to the tone bank. The enkwanzi is often played solo or as part of traditional ensembles in Busoga culture, accompanying dances, rituals, and other cultural events.

The melodic capabilities of the enkwanzi and similar panpipes may have influenced the development of other types of flutes, particularly those with finger holes. The ability to produce multiple pitches from a single instrument likely inspired innovations in flute design, leading to more complex and versatile wind instruments.

== Classification ==
The enkwanzi is classified as an aerophone Blow Hole-panpipe with the following typical dimensions: Longest pipe: 49.5 cm (19-1/2 in.); Shortest pipe: 22.9 cm (9 in.); Total width: 33 cm (13 in.). It is a 19th century traditional instrument that produces sound through the vibration of a column of air. Specifically, it is a type of edge-blown aerophone, where the player directs a stream of air across the sharp edge of the open tube to create sound. This classification places the enkwanzi in the same family as other flutes and panpipes found in various cultures around the world.

== Cultural significance and preservation ==
The enkwanzi holds cultural importance in the Busoga region, where it is used in various traditional ceremonies and performances. However, its use has declined in modern times due to the influence of contemporary music and globalization.
