= Endege =

Ugandan idiophone percussion instrument

Endege, also known as ankle bells, are traditional idiophone percussion instruments widely used in various parts of Uganda. Idiophones are a category of musical instruments that produce sound primarily through the vibration of the instrument itself, without the need for strings, membranes, or external resonators.

== Description and use ==
Endege are typically made of metal and consist of small, forged bells or jingles that produce sound when the wearer moves. Endege's small metal bells create sound through vibration when struck, shaken, or moved. These bells are tied around the ankles of dancers, producing rhythmic jingles that accentuate their movements and enhance the auditory experience of traditional dances. As idiophones, they generate sound through their own vibration, requiring no additional strings or membranes. The bells are lightweight and designed for comfort, allowing dancers to move freely while creating melodic, rhythmic sounds. They are often attached to adjustable straps, ensuring a secure fit around the ankles.

== Versatility ==
While primarily used as ankle bells, endege can also be worn on the wrists or shaken by hand, depending on the performance requirements. Their versatility extends to modern musical settings, where they are sometimes incorporated into drum sets or other percussion arrangements. As idiophones, they offer a wide range of rhythmic possibilities, making them adaptable to various musical contexts.

Beyond their use in music and dance, endege also serves a practical purpose in some communities. When a child begins to walk, bells are sometimes tied around their ankles. This not only encourages the child to walk but also helps caregivers locate the child by the sound of the bells, ensuring they do not wander off or get lost.

== Read also ==
- Ebinyege
- Endongo
