= Engalabi =

Ugandan musical instrument

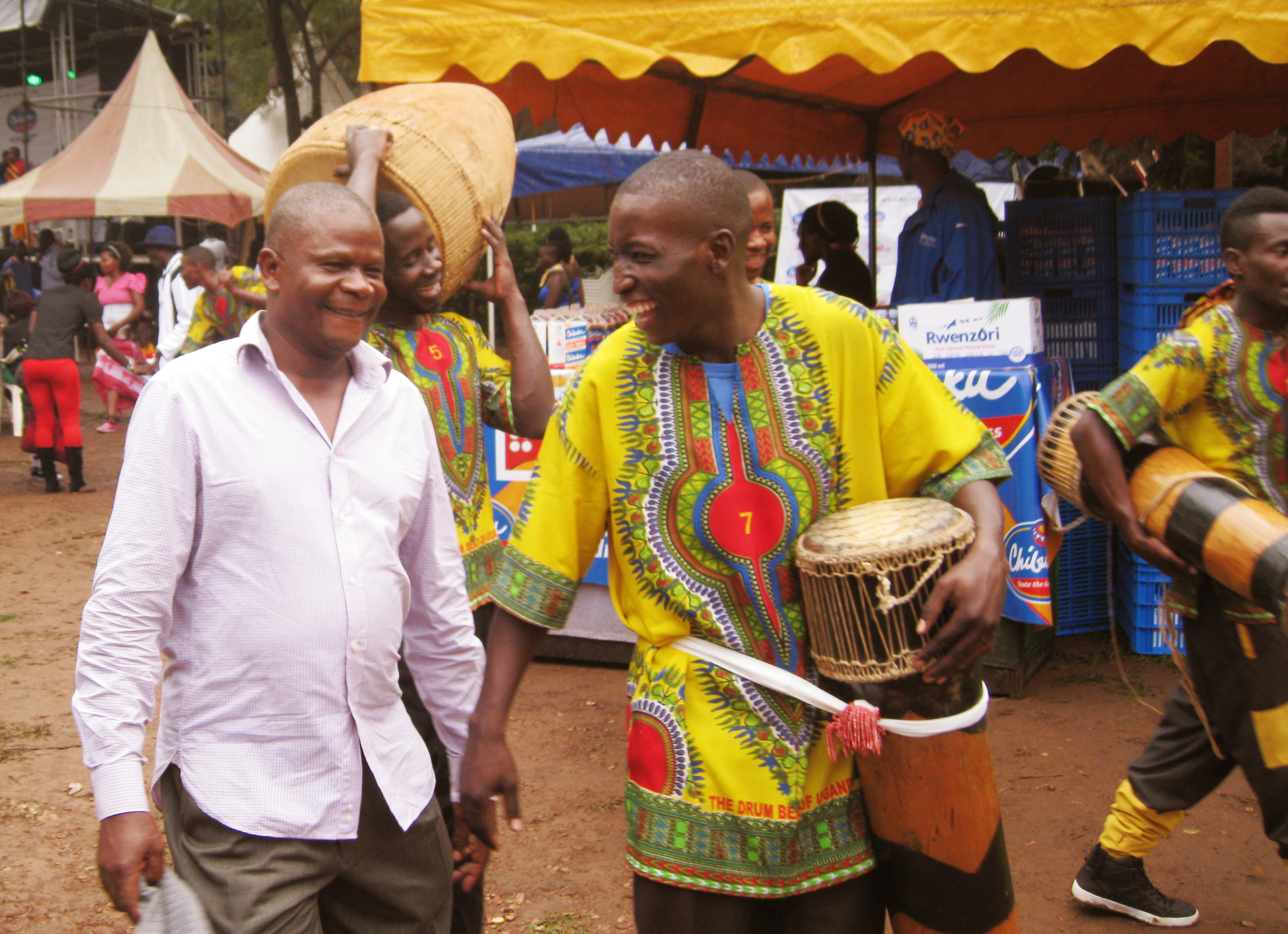
- A man holding an Engalabi in his hands

Percussion instrument

The Engalabi, also known as the Engoma ensajja, is a membranophone percussion instrument commonly used in Central Africa, particularly in Uganda. It is associated with tribes such as the Baganda, Banyankole, Buzimba, and Tagwenda. The instrument is also referred to by various other names, including omugalabi, engaija, egaabi, omugudu, omugwabe, long drum, Engaabe (in Lusoga), and emiidiri (in Ateso).

== Design ==
The Engalabi is a long, cylindrical drum covered with skin, typically sourced from reptiles such as pythons or monitor lizards, or from antelopes, stretched over its wooden dowels. However, the Uganda Wildlife Authority (UWA) has prohibited the use of monitor lizard skin for making long drums. Violators face fines or imprisonment for up to six years.

The Engalabi is first either placed between the knees, held with one arm, or strapped to the waist or shoulder using a piece of cloth, banana fiber, or a cowhide strap. It is then tapped with the hands and is often played in combination with other instruments, such as Ngoma drums, rattles, Ensaasi, royal horns, or flutes.

== Usage ==
The Engalabi is commonly used by Ugandan tribes, including the Baganda, Banyankole, Bateso, Basoga, Buzimba, and Tagwenda. It is featured in musical festivals, dance performances, and serves as a means of conveying messages during traditional ceremonies. For instance, it is played throughout the night during the "Okwabya Olumbe" ceremony, loosely translated as "Attending the funeral," and during twin initiation rituals. Each sound from the Engalabi carries meaning in Buganda; for example, "Gwanga Mujje," loosely translated as "Community, come," and "Sagala agalamidde," which loosely translates to "I don’t want anyone sleeping." It is also used by Ugandan music producers in music production and in theatre productions, such as poetry.

In Buganda, Baganda women were prohibited from playing the Engalabi, as it was traditionally played by holding it between the drummer's thighs. Women who were breastfeeding or menstruating were also not allowed to play the Engalabi. However, in the Lubiri, women were permitted to play the Engalabi during a "Masiro" ceremony dedicated to the Kabaka's predecessors by the royal orchestra. In modern Buganda, women are allowed to play all traditional musical instruments in musical, dance, and theatre performances.

== Monument ==
The Engalabi monument, which is split into two parts, stands 11 meters high and has a diameter of 12.8 meters. It is located at the roundabout along Kabaka Anjagala Road, also known as the Royal Mile or King's Way, in Rubaga, near Bulange. The monument features additional drums called Nankasa at its base. It is divided into two parts to provide access to the Kabaka, in line with his title "Kabaka Nantawetwa." The Royal Mile stretches from Bulange to the Lubiri.

== See also ==
- Music of Uganda
- Culture of Uganda
- Endongo
- List of African Musical Instruments
- Bakisimba
