= Ebinyege =

Ugandan musical instrument that is worn on the legs of the dancers

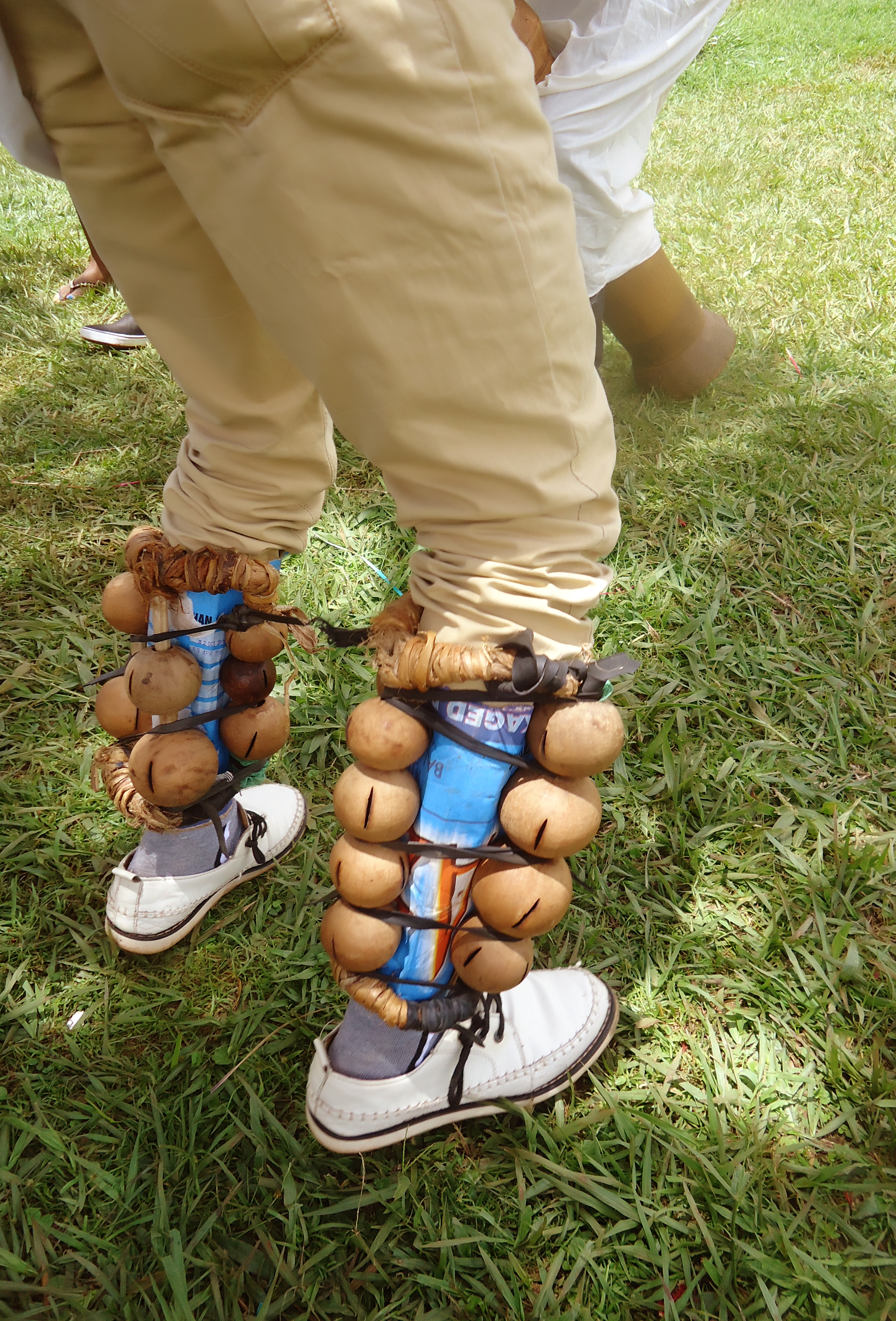
- A man wearing Ebinyege on his lower legs
- Other names: orunyegye, enyege, obunyegye, obuyebe, enzebazebe

Ebinyege also known as orunyegye, enyege, obunyegye, obuyebe, enzebazebe are traditional leg rattles used by several ethnic groups in Uganda, particularly among the Banyankole, Bakiga, and Bagisu communities. Worn on the lower legs, Ebinyege produce percussive sounds that complement drumming and singing in various cultural ceremonies and festivities.

== Materials and construction ==
Ebinyege are typically made from dried gourds or small hollowed-out pods filled with seeds, beads, or pebbles. These are attached to a woven band or string that dancers tie around their ankles. The number and arrangement of the rattles can vary depending on the region and the specific dance for which they are used. Traditional artisans craft Ebinyege using locally sourced materials.

== Cultural significance ==
Ebinyege are integral to several traditional dances in Uganda. Among the Banyankole and Bakiga, they are commonly used in the Ekitaguriro dance and the sound of the rattles accentuates the rhythm and energy of the dance. For the Bagisu people, Ebinyege feature prominently in the Imbalu (circumcision) ceremonies, where young men undergoing the rite of passage perform vigorous dances to the accompaniment of these rattles. They are also used in the Orunyege-Ntogoro dance - a traditional dance from the Bunyoro and Tooro kingdoms in western Uganda. Orunyege comes from Hoima and Fort Portal districts, while Ntogoro comes from Masindi district. The dance is performed by young men and women who seek to attract and impress potential partners for marriage. The rhythmic jingling signifies stamina and agility, both essential qualities celebrated in the ceremony.

== Usage and performance ==
When performing, dancers wear Ebinyege on both legs, ensuring that every step and movement contributes to the overall rhythm of the performance. The rattles' sound is carefully coordinated with the beats of traditional drums and songs. In group performances, dancers synchronize their movements, creating a unified and engaging musical effect.

== Modern relevance ==
They are used in national celebrations, cultural festivals, and tourism events, preserving traditional dance forms for future generations. Some Ugandan artists have also incorporated Ebinyege into modern music performances, blending traditional sounds with contemporary beats.

== See also ==
- Music of Uganda
- Culture of Uganda
- Endongo
- List of African Musical Instruments
- Bakisimba
