= Inanga (instrument) =

East African traditional musical instrument

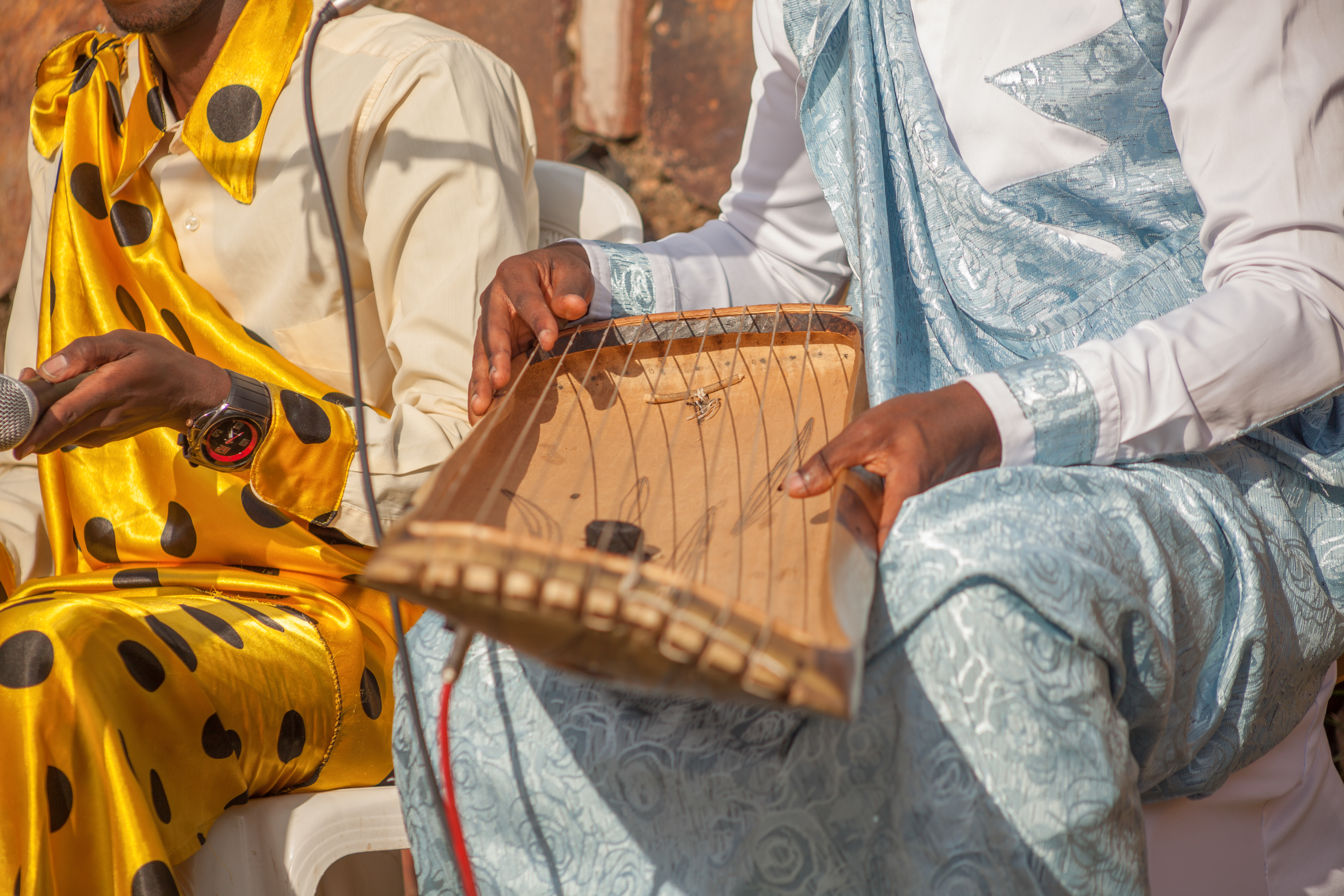
- An inanga being played at a wedding in Kigali, Rwanda.

String instrument
- Other names: enanga, ennanga, ikivuvu, indimbagazo
- Classification: trough zither
- Hornbostel–Sachs classification: 315.1 (without resonator) or 315.2 (with resonator) (Trough zithers. Instruments in which strings are stretched across the mouth of a trough.)
- Developed: Modern examples come from Africa, especially the Great Lakes Region of East Africa.

The inānga (also known as enanga, ennanga, ikivuvu, and indimbagazo) is a traditional musical instrument played in Burundi, Rwanda, Uganda, and parts of the Democratic Republic of Congo. It consists of a slightly concave soundboard framed by a thick notched rim which holds strings in place over the board. Ināngas typically have between six and eight strings.

== Construction & use ==
Ināngas range from 75 cm to 1 m in length, and 25 to 30 cm in width. There are two types of decorations for the soundboard: star-shaped or oval incisions, which are referred to as "the eyes of the inanga" and serve to distribute sound, and burnt wood markings. Ināngas are made of a number of trees, including the igiháhe, umwūngo, umukoni or umunyáre.

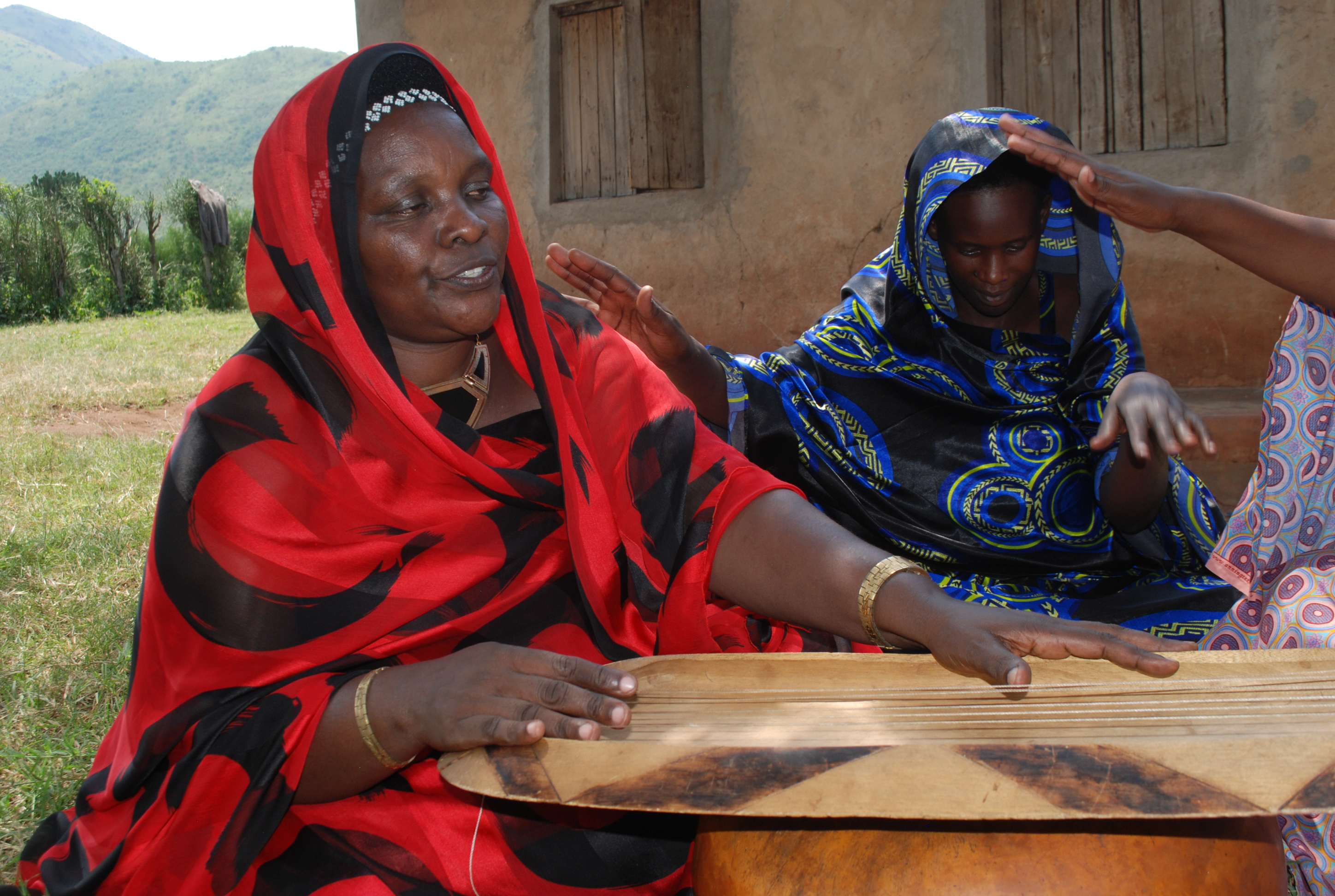
An inanga performance in Busongora, Uganda.

Natural fibers are used to make the strings; traditionally, animal guts or muscle was used, but nowadays, nylon and metal strings can be used. These strings are typically grouped into the following: the imihanuro, the top two strings, the imirya y'amajwi-ihibongoza, the middle strings, and the imyakiro, the last two strings. The strings actually consist only of one, very long string that's threaded through the notches. It is then fastened to a wooden peg. The inānga follows the pentatonic scale. The player tunes the instrument by tightening and loosening the instrument accordingly.

The player assumes a sitting posture, resting the instrument against the player's lap. The strings are plucked at full length, but timbral distinctions can be made by plucking at different points along the strings' length. The inānga is almost always played to accompany the player singing a repeated, melodic motif in a distinct, whispery voice. These songs usually concern traditional folklore, historical events, personal experiences, or everyday incidents.

== Culture ==
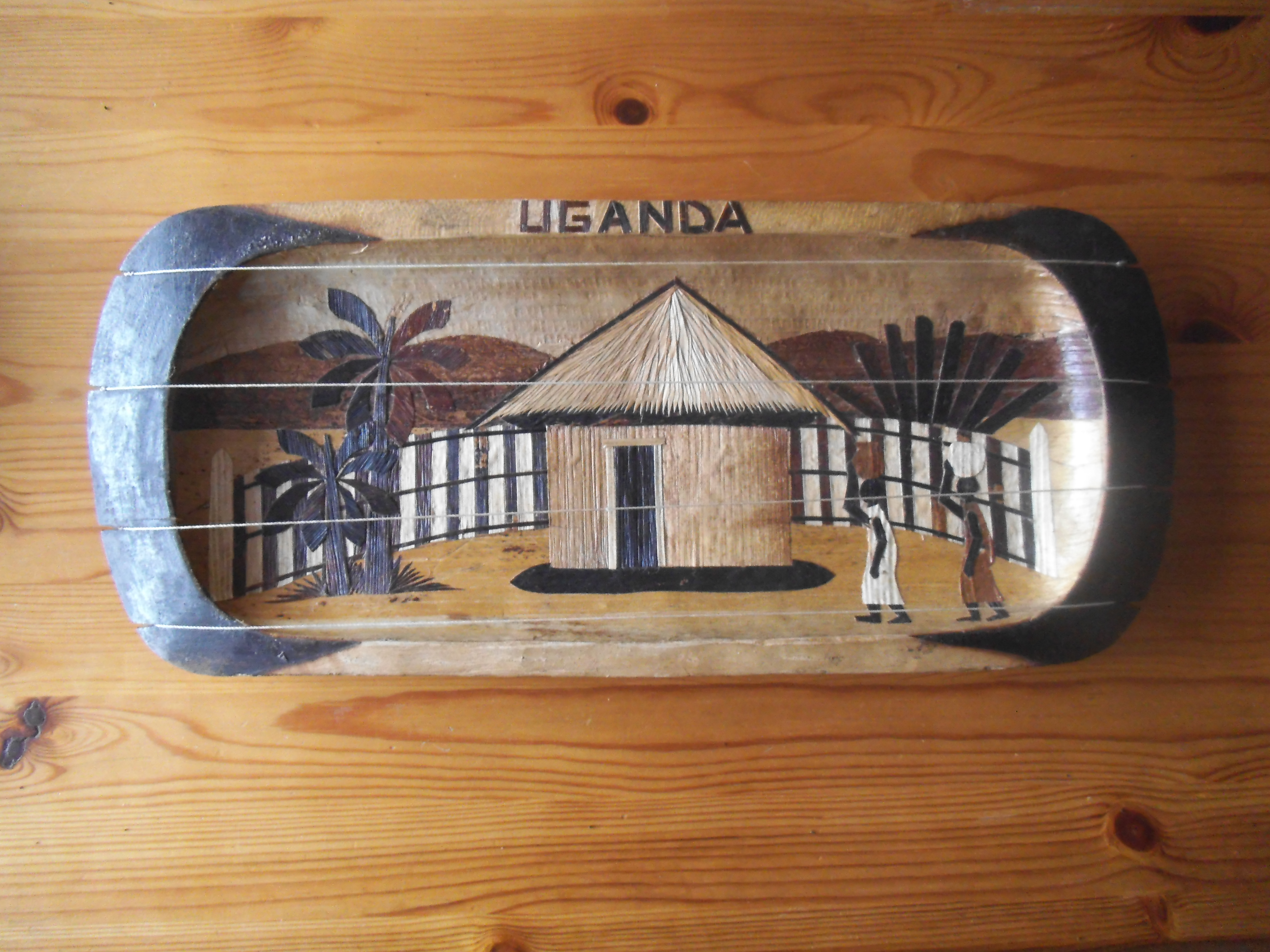
A souvenir inanga from Kabale, Uganda.

In the past, the inānga was primarily played by professional musicians for chiefs; they typically sang epic and historical songs praising their patron.

Children are not usually taught to play inānga. A father generally keeps his inānga in a visible place, and the child learns to play on his own. Inānga playing is typically considered to be a male activity, and most known inānga players are male.

In Burundi, the inānga was traditionally played for the mwamis of Burundi as they rested at night. The inānga was also played to cows, for it was thought that they loved the sound. It is considered to be the first instrument to be invented in the country.

In Rwanda, the inānga is considered to be one of the important and revered music instruments. Some notable Rwandan inānga players include: Thomas Kirusu, Victor Kabarira, Sentore Masamba, Vianney Mushabizi, Jules Sentore, Joseph Sebatunzi, Daniel Ngarukiye, and Sophie Nzayisenga.
