= Amakondere =

African instrument

- Classification: Aerophone
- Hornbostel–Sachs classification: 423.121
- Developed: Pre-colonial, likely 15th–16th century

Playing range
- Single octave, variable with embouchure

Related instruments
- Bugle, Kakaki, Adungu, Endingidi

Builders
- Busoga artisans, Jinja and Iganga workshops

The amakondere is a type of natural trumpet found in Uganda and Rwanda.

Low-pitched instruments are cut from the trunks of the papaw tree and are blown in a straight position through a mouth-hole at the end. In an ensemble of these instruments, each player sounds his single pitch. These come from the Lugbara and Kebu tribes of the west Nile region. They are played in groups of seven or more. These side-blown horns sometimes have a fingerhole, which is used for grace-note ornaments.

== See also ==
- Bunyoro Kingdom
- Okuguruka Amakondere (dance performed to Amakondere music)
- Abakondere (traditional trumpeters)
- Natural horns and trumpet
