= Ngoma drums =

Bantu drum

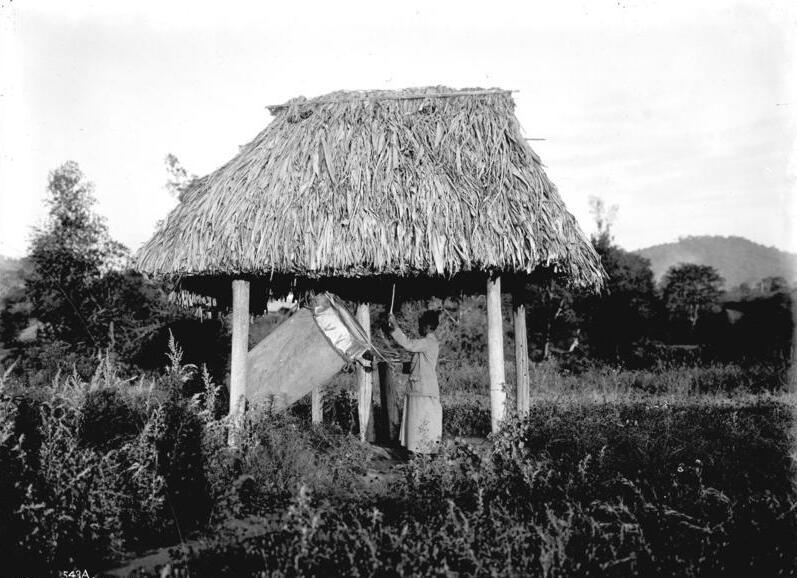
Ngoma drum in German East Africa in 1906

Ngoma (also called engoma or ng'oma or ingoma) are musical instruments used by certain Bantu-speaking populations of Central, East and Southern Africa. Ngoma is derived from the Kikongo word for "drum". Different Bantu-inhabited regions have their own traditions of percussion, with different names for their instruments. In Kikongo, "ngoma" is used by extension to signify specific dances, social occasions, and rhythms. In Swahili, Ngoma music is used to describe music, dance, instruments including the drums, and events together as a joint cultural practice.

== Use in the Great Lakes and Southern Africa ==
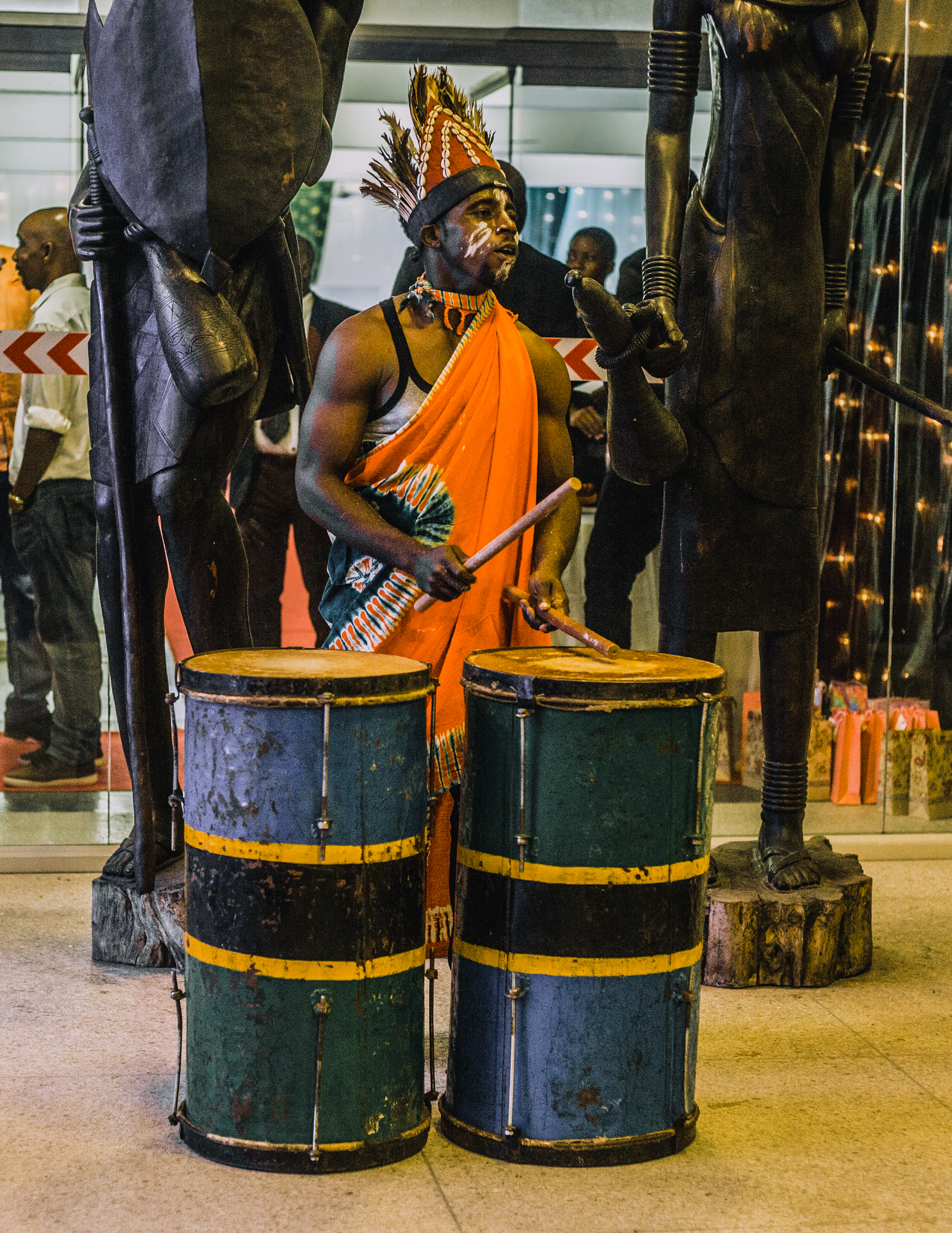
Ngoma drums in Tanzania

The ngoma drum is known as engoma throughout the African Great Lakes region. In Swahili, ngoma resulted because of unease in pronouncing engoma by dropping the syllable e.

The Banyankore hold drums in high regard; especially the royal drums headed by Bagyendanwa, without which a prince never laid claim to kingship.

The Baganda of Uganda have a special relationship with ngoma drums, so much so that it is thought by many people that theirs is the country where this type of drum actually originated. The Baganda are fondly thought of as the children of Ngoma. The ngoma is used for communication and celebration and is also a symbol of authority. Ngoma is also used for storytelling.

The ngoma are made of wood, which is covered with cow skin pegged on both ends, although you’ll also find tourist versions of these drums covered with zebra skins. Typically, they are played in groups of seven drums, each drum having its own voice and function within the ensemble. Another popular configuration is made with at least four drums. Each of these drums is treated as individuals, thus they each have a specific name. The largest drum is known as bakisimba and makes a loud bass sound. Some call it the Master drum. The empuunya is a little smaller and also produces a higher-pitched bass sound. The Nankasa is a small drum played with sticks and produces a very high-pitched sound. Last, but not least is the engalabi. The engalabi most closely resembles the original ngoma and is taller and more cylindrical than all the other drums in this set. It also has skin on only one side. All of the other drums are covered with cow skin on the top and bottom using an intricate lacing system, whereas the engalabi has a lizard-skin head attached with small wooden pegs. This drum makes the highest pitched sound in the ensemble. The most popular African drums include the Djembe, Dundun, Bata, and Bougarabou just to highlight a few. Djembe means "everyone gather together in peace" according to Mali people.

Throughout Central and South Africa, ngoma ceremonies are used to assist in healing during ceremonies. The rituals involve rhythmic music and dance, and can result in “stress reduction, social support, support of prosocial behaviors, psychodynamic growth, and placebo effect”. Ngoma often serves as a tool to unify the tribe, and assist in health or life transitions and a way to communicate to the spirits. The ngoma drum is also used in Zimbabwe, mainly for traditional dances and celebrations.

All of the drums can be played with sticks or hands, except the Nankasa which is primarily played with two sticks.

== Recordings ==
- Columbia Records: Drums of Passion. Liner notes by Akinsola Akiwowo (1958).

== Additional reading ==
- Chamisa, V. (2017). Approaches to the adaptation of Shona ngoma styles in Zimbabwean popular music. African Music, vol. 10, no. 3.
