= Endingidi =

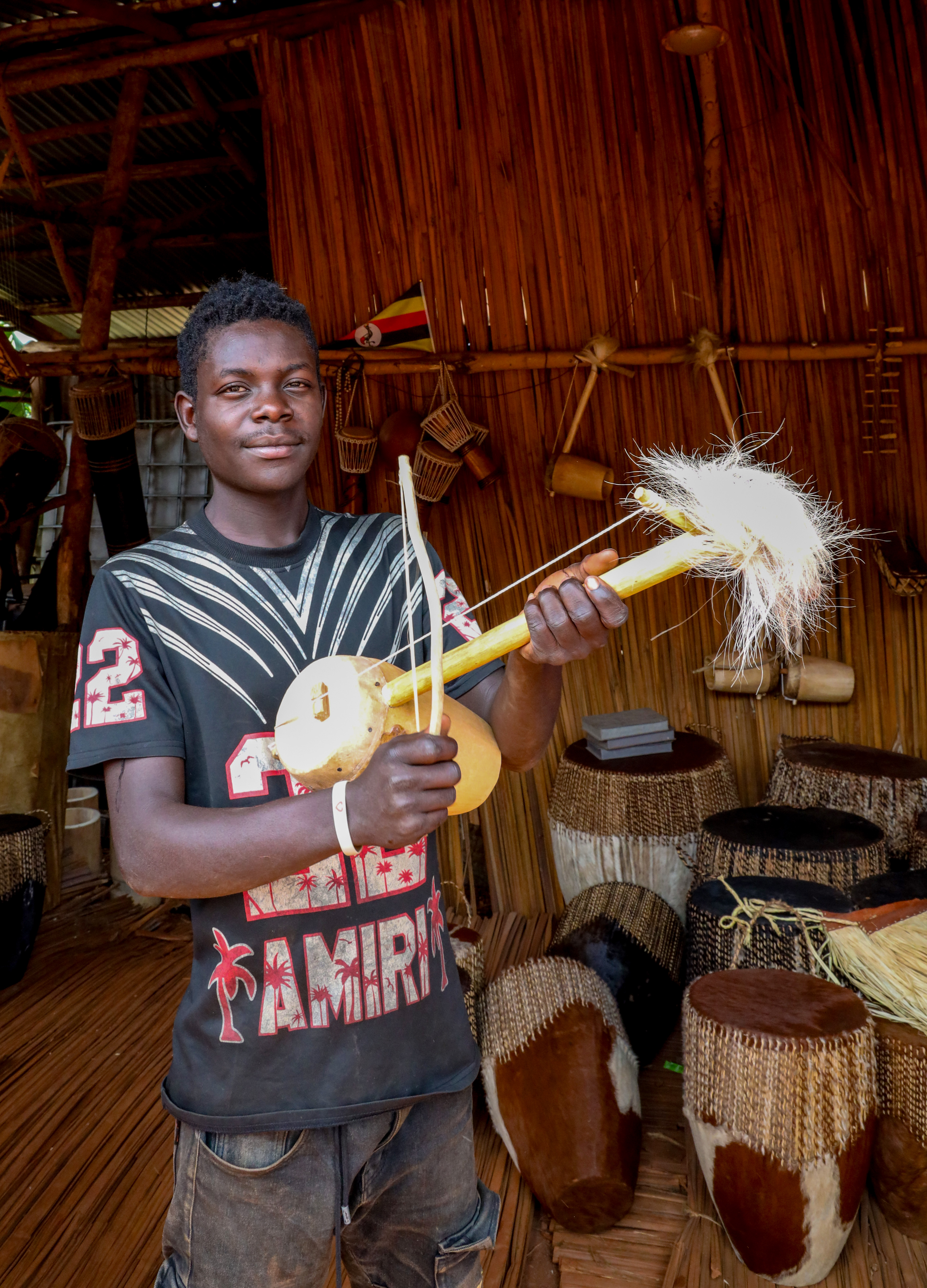
Endingidi

The endingidi (endingiri in Luganda) is a type of bowed string instrument native to Uganda. The endingidi has one string, extending from the neck to a cylindrical sound-box or resonator made of wood or cow horn. A piece of hide is stretched over the top of the cylinder and is fixed to the sound-box with wooden pegs, thorny spines or nowadays also with metal nails. The hide used is usually that of the monitor lizard (varanus exanthematicus) but also of young goats and sheep or even of the python. The hide is soaked in water for a whole day before being stretched over the sound-box. The neck consists of a straight wooden stick inserted through the walls of the sound-box at about 2 to 3 cm from the top. At the top of the neck a hole is bored at 4 to 6 cm from the end into which a tuning pin is inserted vertically. The string is secured to this pin in such a way that the string can be wound round the pin in a similar way as with a violin. This allows the string to be tightened, so tuning the instrument. The string runs across the sound-box via a bridge and is fixed to the other end of the neck. The string is made of fibre or animal sinew, but nowadays it is more often of nylon. The arched bow consists of a thin flexible twig, to which a string is attached, usually of the same material as the string of the instrument itself. To give the bow more grip on the string of the instrument, resin is rubbed into the bow string. The resin is often attached to the side of the sound-box so the player can easily rub resin on the bow as he plays.

The instrument is rarely decorated; this is usually due to regional traditions. The sound-box is sometimes decorated with pyrographed designs, the neck with white and blue beads and the end of the neck with a brush of hair from the tail of a goat or a cow. The meat and bones are then removed from the tail, which is then stretched over the neck. As the skin dries, it shrinks and tightens around the neck.

The instrument is tuned in accordance with the range of the singing voices, either by turning the tuning pin or moving the bridge.

The player holds the neck of the instrument in the palm of his left hand as he plays and so can damp the string with the second segment of his index finger, middle finger or ring finger. The hollow sound-box of the endingidi is held against the body and the bow is held in the right hand and is moved very quickly backwards and forwards across the string.

According to ancient sources, the endingidi is not a traditional Ankole instrument but was introduced from Bunyoro Kitara Kingdom Bunyoro around 1910 while it was still the conglomerate kingdom holding most or all of the Bantu speaking tribes of East Africa. Endingidi is however believed to have been invented by the Busoga people of Eastern Uganda which explains why they are the tribe most known to play the instrument and work with it creatively, you are most likely to encounter the endingidi while in Busoga than in any other part of Uganda. This is coupled with the Bigwala also invented by the Basoga ,

The endingidi player sings or rather rhythmically speaks as he plays. Among the Basoga people of Busoga Kingdom, the endingidi was usually played solo, but nowadays it is increasingly combined with the engoma(drum) and rattles. Among the Kooki and the Ziba, two endingidi mostly play together with a drum and rattles and in combination with clapping. Among the Kiga and the Hororo, this ensemble is melodically enriched with the omubanda flute.

The endingidi is played by men when they play music for relaxation and the common thread in the lyrics of the songs is social life. The endingidi also used to be played in ritual music and at weddings.

https://www.newvision.co.ug/new_vision/news/1333991/bigwala-busoga-royal-music-dancehttp://www.singingwells.org/instrument-ethnicities/busoga/*Digitalisatie van het Etnomusicologisch Klankarchief van het Koninklijk Museum voor Midden-Afrika / Digitization of the Ethnomusicological Sound Archive of the Royal Museum for Central Africa
