= Haya language =

Bantu language of Tanzania

Haya
- Luhaya, Oruhaya
- Region: Tanzania
- Ethnicity: Haya people
- Native speakers: 1.3 million (2006)
- Language family: Niger–Congo?: Atlantic–Congo; Volta-Congo; Benue–Congo; Bantoid; Southern Bantoid; Bantu; Northeast Bantu; Great Lakes Bantu; West Nyanza; Rutara; South Rutara; Haya

Language codes
- ISO 639-3: hay
- Glottolog: haya1250
- Guthrie code: JE.22

Haya (Oruhaya) is a Bantu language spoken by the Haya people of Tanzania, in the south and southwest coast of Lake Victoria. In 1991, the population of Haya speakers was estimated at 1,200,000 people . Its closest relative is the Nyambo language and it is also closely related to the languages of western Uganda such as Nyoro-Tooro and Nkore-Kiga which all form a group called Rutara.

Maho (2009) classifies JE221 Rashi as closest to Haya. It has no ISO code, but is covered by the ISO 639-3 code hay.

== Phonology ==
=== Consonants ===
		Labial	Alveolar	Palatal	Velar	Glottal
Nasal		m	n	ɲ		
Plosive/ Affricate	voiceless	p	t	t͡ʃ	k	
Plosive/ Affricate	voiced	b	d	d͡ʒ	ɡ	
Fricative	voiceless	f	s	ʃ		h
Fricative	voiced		z			
Approximant			l	j	w	

=== Vowels ===
	Front	Central	Back
High	i iː		u uː
Mid	e eː		o oː
Low		a aː	

When a high vowel /i, u/ precedes a non-high vowel, it is realized as an approximant sound [j, w].

=== Tones ===
Two tones are present in Haya; high /v́/ and low /v̀/.

== Grammar ==
=== Tense ===
Haya has nine tenses. These are the present progressive, the present habitual, the past habitual and the perfect, alongside two future tenses and three past tenses. The future tense F_{2} refers to the distant future whilst F_{1} refers to the near future. P_{1} refers to the most recent past - events that have occurred earlier in the day, P_{2} refers to events that happened yesterday and P_{3}, the most distant past, refers to events that happened before yesterday.

== See also ==
- Betbeder, Paul; Jones, John. 1949. A handbook of the Haya language. Bukoba (Tanganyika): White Fathers Printing Press.
- Byarushengo, Ernest Rugwa; Duranti, Alessandro; Hyman, Larry M[ichael]. (Eds.) 1977. Haya grammatical structure: phonology, grammar, discourse. (Southern California occasional papers in linguistics (SCOPIL), no 6.) Los Angeles: Department of Linguistics, University of Southern California. Pp 213.
- Herrmann, [Kapitän] C. 1904. Lusíba, die Sprache der Länder Kisíba, Bugábu, Kjamtwára, Kjánja und Ihángiro. Mitteilungen des Seminars für orientalische Sprachen, 7 (III. Abt.), pp. 150–200.
- Kaji, Shigeki. (Ed.) 1998. Haya. (Textbooks for language training.) Tokyo: Institute for the Study of Languages and Cultures of Asia and Africa (ILCAA), Tokyo University of Foreign Studies.
- Kaji, Shigeki. 2000. Haya vocabulary. (Asian and African lexicon series, no 37.) Tokyo: Institute for the Study of Languages and Cultures of Asia and Africa (ILCAA), Tokyo University of Foreign Studies. Pp 532. ISBN 4-87297-772-6
- Kuijpers, Em. 1922. Grammaire de la langue haya. Boxtel (Hollande): Prokuur van de Witte Paters. Pp 294.
- Maho, Jouni & Bonny Sands. 2002. The languages of Tanzania: a bibliography. (Orientalia et africana gothoburgensia, no 17.) Göteborg: Acta Universitatis Gothoburgensis. Pp ix, 428. ISBN 91-7346-454-6
- Rehse, Hermann. 1912/13. Die Sprache der Baziba in Deutsch-Ostafrika. Zeitschrift für Kolonialsprachen, 3, pp. 1–33, 81–123, 201–229.
