= Buruuli =

Buruuli (place) is a general term used to refer to the area where the Baruuli live. It is located in the district of Nakasongola, as well as in Bugerere Kayunga District. The Baruuli speak the Ruruuli language, a Bantu language closely related to Lunyala, a language spoken by the Banyala of Kayunga District. The Baruuli are part of Buganda Kingdom. The Chief of Buruli is Kimbugwe. Buruuli is a semi desert area where Lake Kyoga is their main source of food, employment and wealth. The Baruuli people are herdsmen, farmers, fishermen and charcoal burners. They too carry out trade with the neighborhood in fish, charcoal and food. Their staple food is sweet potatoes and matooke. They too grow millet, peanuts, yams, cassava, and other kinds of vegetables.

Their land is very dry almost all months but they do farming near the shores of their cherished lake Kyoga. Sometimes, these Bantu speaking people refer to themselves-and by others as Baduuli which means “Boasters”. This is a term that has been used for long ever since the creation of their territories. Every family had a banana plantation and cows and this made them very happy and boastful to the other tribes they associated and lived with. All they cherished was their long-horned cows similar to the Nsagala-long horned cows of the Banyankole of Bushenyi and Mbarara Districts in the Western Uganda.

These cows were a source of wealth both to a family and their relatives. They used to exchange cows for other breeds of cattle, sheep and goats. They were also used in the marriage ceremonies as the groom was to pay four cows to the family of the bride. Lake Kyoga remains their cherished asset because it is regarded as their heart. Without it, they cannot get sauce, money and other necessities of life.

Commercially, the Baruuli of Buruli trade with the neighbors who include the Langi, Acholi, Banyoro and Bakenyi and Basoga. Exchange of fish for boats, cows for other necessities were carried out, but is extinct now.

  1. Buruuli and Buganda Kingdom##

Buruuli remains part of Buganda Kingdom. Recently, Isabaruuli was installed by 129 clan heads and crowned by President Yoweri Kaguta Museveni on December 10, 2004. This was nullified by the constitutional court.

== See also ==
- Buruli ulcer
