= Kiga language =

Language of the Kiga people

Kiga
- Chiga
- Orukiga
- Native to: Uganda, Rwanda
- Ethnicity: Bakiga, Twa
- Native speakers: 1.6 million (2002 census)
- Language family: Niger–Congo?: Atlantic–Congo; Volta-Congo; Benue–Congo; Bantoid; Southern Bantoid; Bantu; Northeast Bantu; Great Lakes Bantu; West Nyanza; Rutara; North Rutara; Nkore-Kiga-Nyoro-Tooro; Nkore-Kiga; Kiga
- Standard forms: Runyakitara

Language codes
- ISO 639-3: cgg
- Glottolog: chig1238
- Guthrie code: JE.14

A Kiga speaker, recorded in Uganda.

Kiga (also called Rukiga, Ruchiga, or Chiga) is a Great Lakes Bantu language of the Kiga people (Bakiga). Kiga is a similar and partially mutually intelligible with the Nkore language. It was first written in the second half of the 19th century.

Kiga is largely spoken in the ancient Kigezi region which includes about 5 districts, namely Rubanda, Rukiga, Kabale, Kanungu and some parts of Rukungiri. As of 2021, Kiga is spoken natively by about 1.3 million people in Uganda.

Kiga is so similar to Nkore (84%–94% lexical similarity) that some argue they are dialects of the same language, called Nkore-Kiga by Charles Taylor.

== Phonology ==
	Front	Central	Back
Close	i		u
Mid	ɛ		o
Open		a	

- Sounds /i, u/ can also range to [ɪ, ʊ] when short or lax.
- /a/ can range from a central [ä] to a back [ɑ] sound.

Consonants
		Labial	Alveolar	Post-alv./ Palatal	Velar	Glottal
Nasal		m	n	ɲ	ŋ	
Plosive/ Affricate	voiceless	p	t	t͡ʃ	k	
Plosive/ Affricate	voiced	b	d	d͡ʒ	g	
Fricative	voiceless	f	s	ʃ		h
Fricative	voiced	v	z	ʒ		
Trill			r			
Approximant				j	w	

- /r/ can also be heard as a glide [ɹ] in free variation.
- /b/ can be heard as [ʋ] in intervocalic positions.

== Orthography ==
- a - [a]
  - ai - [ai̯]
- b - [b]
- ch - [t͡ʃ] (sometimes written 'c')
- (d - [d])
- e - [ɛ]
  - ei - [ɛi̯]
- f - [f]
- g - [g] (not before vowels), [gʲ] (before /i/)
  - gy - [ɟ] (/ɡ/ before vowels other than /i/)
- h - [h]
- i - [i]
- j - [d͡ʒ]
- k - [k] (not before vowels), [kʲ] (before /i/)
  - ky - [c] (/k/ before vowels other than /i/)
- m - [m]
  - mp - [mp]
  - mw - [mw]
- n - [n]
  - nd - [nd]
  - ng - [ŋ]
  - ny - [ɲ]
- o - [ɔ]
  - oi - [ɔi̯]
- (p - [p])
- r - [r]
- s - [s]
  - sh - [ʃ]
- t - [t]
- ts - [t͡s]
- u - [u]
- v - [v]
- w - [w]
- y - [j]
- z - [z]

D and P are only used in foreign names and loanwords.

== Grammar ==
In common with other Bantu languages, Kiga has a noun class system in which prefixes on nouns mark membership of one of the noun genders. Pronouns, adjectives, and verbs reflect the noun gender of the nominal they refer to. Some examples of noun classes:

- mu – person (singular), e.g. omukiga = inhabitant of Kigezi land
- ru – language, e.g. Rukiga = language of the Kiga
- ba – people, e.g. Bakiga = The Kiga people
- ki – customs or traditions, e.g. kikiga, (sometimes spelled Kichiga), describes religious tradition common to the Kiga people. Sometimes the people are called 'Chiga' by people misunderstanding the linguistic rules in relation to the prefixes.

The sound [l] is not distinctive in Rukiga. The letter "r" is used instead.

== See also ==
- Runyakitara language
- Nkore-Kiga
