= Tooro language =

Bantu language spoken in Uganda

Tooro
- Rutooro
- Orutooro
- Pronunciation: [oɾutóːɾo]
- Native to: Uganda
- Region: Tooro Kingdom
- Ethnicity: Batooro
- Native speakers: (490,000 cited 1991 census)
- Language family: Niger–Congo?: Atlantic–Congo; Volta-Congo; Benue–Congo; Bantoid; Southern Bantoid; Bantu; Northeast Bantu; Great Lakes Bantu; West Nyanza; Rutara; North Rutara; Nkore-Kiga-Nyoro-Tooro; Tooro
- Standard forms: Runyakitara
- Dialects: Tuku

Language codes
- ISO 639-3: ttj
- Glottolog: toor1238
- Guthrie code: JE.12

Tooro
- Person: Omutooro
- People: Abatooro
- Language: Orutooro
- Country: Obukama bwa Tooro

Tooro (/tɔːroʊ/) or Rutooro (/ruːˈtɔːroʊ/, Orutooro, Tooro pronunciation: [oɾutóːɾo]) is a Bantu language spoken mainly by the Tooro people (Abatooro) from the Tooro Kingdom in western Uganda. There are three main areas where Tooro as a language is mainly used: Kabarole District, Kyenjojo District and Kyegegwa District. Tooro is unusual among Bantu languages as it lacks lexical tone. It is most closely related to Runyoro.

== Phonology ==
=== Vowels ===
Tooro has 5 short vowels and 5 corresponding long vowels. It also has 3 diphthongs.

Tooro vowels
	Front	Back
Close	i (Note: /i/ and /u/ can devoice between two voiceless consonants or word-finally (e.g. okutu [okú̥tu̥] "ear"). /i/ is often interchangeable with /u/ dialectally (e.g. enyima/enyuma "underside").) (Note: /i/ can optionally be centralised to /ɨ/, especially when adjacent to /u/ (e.g. omumiro [omumɨ́ɾo] "throat").)	u
Close-mid	e	o
Open	a	

==== Nasal vowels ====
Vowels followed by a nasal cluster tend to be nasalised, even to the point that the nasal consonant is barely heard (e.g. Abakonjo [aβakṍːⁿd͡ʒo] "Konjo people").

==== Vowel lengthening ====
Vowels can be lengthened in these contexts:

- Compensatory lengthening as a result of glide formation (e.g. o-mu-ána → [omwáːna] "child")
  - If the second vowel is not high-toned but part of a noun phrase, the second vowel is half-lengthened (e.g. o-mu-ana wange → [omwaˑna wáŋge] "my child"]
- A high-toned vowel comes before a consonant cluster where the first consonant is nasal (e.g. omugongo [omugóːŋgo] "back").
  - If the high-toned vowel follows a consonant cluster, the vowel is not lengthened (e.g. [omwénda] "(unit of) nine").
  - If the vowel is not high-toned but part of a noun phrase, the second vowel is half-lengthened (e.g. omugongo gumu [omugoˑŋgo gúmu] "one back")
- A word follows the structure VCV (where C = consonant and V = vowel) and the first vowel has a high tone (e.g. enu [éːnu] "this (class 9)")
  - If the word follows the structure (C)VCVCV and the second vowel has a high tone, the first vowel is half-lengthened (e.g. omubu [oˑmúbu] "mosquito"
- Two identical vowels near each other (e.g. a-ba-ana → [abáːna] "children")
- Two underlying consecutive vowels where one of them is not seen on the surface due to vowel elision (the first vowel is dropped) (e.g. ni-a-kir-a → [naːkíɾa] "he/she is becoming cured")
  - The lengthening does not apply to the negative element ti-, but the dropping does (e.g. ti-o-kozire → [tokozíɾe] "you (sg.) have not worked")
- Imbrication, specifically where two -ir suffixes are next to each other and the first /ɾ/ is dropped (e.g. n-jwah-ir-ire → [nd͡ʒwahiːɾe] "I am tired in a way")
- A vowel comes before two consecutive nasal consonants (e.g. oku-n-noba → [okuːnóba] "to dislike me (inf.)

==== Vowel shortening ====
Word-final long vowels are shortened, except if they are in the penultimate syllable of a noun phrase. As a result, the inherently long final vowel in obuso "forehead" and the phonetically long final vowel in omutwe "head" are shortened in isolation but are lengthened after a monosyllabic qualifier (obuso bwe [oβusóː βwe] "his/her forehead"; omutwe gwe [omutwéː gwe] "his/her head").

==== Diphthongs ====
Tooro has 3 diphthongs, /ai/, /oi/ and /au/, the latter only being attested in 3 words, 2 being English loanwords (autu "vegetable cooking oil", etauni < Eng. "town", etaulo < Eng. "towel"). In some dialects, /ai/ is pronounced as [ei].

==== Vowel hiatus resolution ====
Tooro has different ways of resolving vowel hiatus in individual words or in between words:

- If the first vowel is /a/ or /o/ and the second vowel is /i/, diphthongisation occurs (e.g. ba-it-a → baita [βáíta] "they kill").
- If the first vowel is /e/ and the second vowel is /i/, /e/ is dropped and causes compensatory lengthening in /i/, although it is not always as such (e.g. o-ku-se-is-a → okusiisa [okusíːsa] "to cause to grind").
- If the first vowel is a non-close vowel and follows a consonant, and if the second vowel is not /i/, the first vowel is dropped and causes compensatory lengthening (e.g. ba-et-a → beeta "they invite").
- If the first vowel is a non-close vowel and does not follow a consonant, and if the second vowel is not /i/, /j/ is epenthetically inserted in the middle of the vowels (e.g. a-et-a → ayeta "he/she invites").
  - This can occur multiple times in the same word (e.g. o-e-et-a → oyeyeta "you (sg) invite yourself")
  - This does not occur if the first vowel is before the tense-aspect-mood affix /-a-/ or the refiexive affix /-e-/ in the subjunctive mood, in which case it glides (e.g. o-a-ka-hik-a → wakahika "you (sg) just arrived", a-e-ror-e → yerole "may he/she see him/herself")

==== Mid vowel harmony ====
Some suffixes that are added to verbs exhibit mid vowel harmony, where the vowel in the suffix (/i/ or /u/) is lowered to a mid vowel (/e/ or /o/ respectively) if the vowel in the ultimate syllable of the verb root is a mid vowel (e.g. okucumbira "to cook for someone"; okusekera "to laugh for someone"). Mid vowel harmony does not apply if consonant mutation to the verb root also applies, instead only the consonant mutation in the verb root applies (e.g. ngenzire (from the root √-gend-) "I went (and the effect remains)" instead of *ngenzere).

=== Consonants ===
Tooro consonants
	Bilabial	Labio-dental	Alveolar	Post-alveolar	Palatal	Velar	Glottal
Plosive	p b (Note: /b/ is mostly used in foreign loanwords and as a post-nasal allophone of /β/.)		t d (Note: /d/ is mostly an allophone of /ɾ/ after a nasal consonant.)			k (Note: /k/ can optionally be palatalised as [c] before /i/ or /j/ (e.g. kyange [cáŋge]).) g	
Affricate				tʃ dʒ			
Fricative	β	f v	s z				h (Note: /h/ becomes /p/ after a nasal consonant. /hj/ is often pronounced [ç] or [ʃ].)
Nasal	m		n		ɲ	ŋ (Note: [ŋ] is an allophone of /n/ before /g/.)	
Tap			ɾ				
Trill			r (Note: /r/ is the result of a vowel dropped between two /ɾ/ sounds (e.g. omurro < omuriro "fire"). This vowel-dropping does not happen if the second /ɾ/ is followed by a semivowel (/j, w/).)				
Approximant			l (Note: [l] is an allophone of /ɾ/ word-initially before /e, i/ (as in liino "(it is) a tooth") or between /a, o, u/ and /e, i/ (as in aliire "he/she has eaten"). /l, r/ also becomes /d/ before a nasal (as in n-li → ndi [ń̩di] "I am").)		j	w	

==== Consonant mutation ====
Certain suffixes, specifically the perfective -ir (not to be confused with the applicative -ir), the nominalizer -i, the short causative -i, and the long causative -is cause the consonant before it to be mutated.

The first two suffixes mutate /ɾ, d͡ʒ/ or [d] to [z] and /t/ to [s] (e.g. barubasire "they have walked" < √-rubat- "to walk"; omubaizi "carpenter < √-baij- "to do carpentry"). However, perfective -ir mutates /d͡ʒ/ to [z] inconsistently (e.g. baizire "they have come" < √-ij- "to come"; bahiijire "they have panted" < √-hiij- "to pant"), and most of the time, it can be used with or without mutation (e.g. babaijire ~ babaizire "they have done carpentry" < √-baij-). The distinction between the perfective and applicative -ir is important as the applicative -ir cannot cause mutation (e.g. okurubatira "to walk for" < okurubata "to walk"). Additionally, only the unmutated perfective -ir can cause mutation, as the mutated form, -iz, cannot cause mutation (e.g. beereze "they have cleaned < √-eer "to clean" instead of *beezize).

Causative -i also mutates /ɾ/ or [d] to [z] and [t] to [s] (no instance has been found of causative -i mutating /d͡ʒ/). Since the /zj/ and /sj/ clusters are not permitted in Tooro"s phonotactics, the /j/ is dropped (e.g. okukwasa "to make touch" < *okukwasya < okukwata "to touch").

Finally, causative -is only mutates /ɾ/ to [z] (e.g. okuhazisa "to cause to scratch" < okuhara "to scratch"). It cannot mutate /d͡ʒ/, [d] or /t/ (e.g. okutundisa "to cause to sell" < okutunda "to sell" instead of *okutunzisa).

=== Tone ===
Tooro has 2 main tones (high and low, low tone being the default), and 2 other tones (falling and rising) that appear in restricted circumstances. It is worth mentioning that vowels and nasal consonants can have a high tone (e.g. nnywa [ń̩ɲwa] "I drink").

==== High tone ====
Although Tooro lacks lexical tone, it has grammatical tone in the form of the high tone. In isolation, the high tone always falls on the penultimate syllable of a word, however, when a noun is modified by a following disyllabic adjective, the noun loses its high tone except if the noun functions as a predicate. -ona "all, whole" and -ombi "both" are exceptions to this, as they let the noun keep its high tone. Additionally, a noun followed by a monosyllabic adjective makes the high tone fall on the last syllable of the noun. An adjective with more than two syllables morphologically lets the noun keep its high tone. This means that ondi "the other (person, class 1)" & endi "the other (class 9)" are considered trisyllabic as they are derived from o-o-ndi/e-e-ndi and overlong vowels are not permissible. Thus, the only difference between [omuːntu óːndi] "another person" and [omúːntu óːndi] "the other person" is the high tone of the noun. Demonstratives also let the noun keep its high tone, regardless if the demonstrative has only 1 or 2 syllables.

- omutwe [omútwe] "head"
- omutwe gwe [omutwéː gwe] "his/her head"
- omutwe gwange [omutwe gwáːŋge] "my head, any of my heads"
- Omutwe gwange. [omútwe gwáːŋge] "The head is mine."
- omutwe ogwange [omútʷ‿ogwáːŋge] "my own head"
- omutwe murungi [omútwe murúːŋgi] "a good head"
- omutwe gunu [omútwe gúnu] "this head"
- omutwe gwona [omútwe gwóːna] "the/a whole head"

==== Falling tone ====
A falling tone appears in two cases:

- When the final two syllables of a word follow the structure CVɾV (where C = consonant and V = vowel), especially when the first vowel is a non-close vowel. (e.g. okukora [okukôɾa] "to work")
- In the penultimate syllable, where the following syllable begins with /j/ (e.g. rediyo [redîjo] < Eng. radio)

==== Rising tone ====
Rising tone is very rare, and only occurs in one case where a monosyllabic noun stem which has no noun prefix is used without an augment word-finally (e.g. enu ka [eːnǔ ka] "this is a house").

=== Phonotactics ===
The following syllable types are allowed in native Tooro words, where V stands for a vowel (short or long), C a consonant, N a nasal consonant, and G a glide.

- V (e.g. ina [íːna] "four (class 10)"): this syllable type is only allowed word-initially.
- CV (e.g. ina [íːna] "four (class 10)")
- N (e.g. ndi [ń̩di] "I am"): this syllable type is also only allowed word initially.
- NCV (e.g. endiisa [endíːsa] "honeyguide")
  - Note that C (consonant) includes other nasal consonants, thus tinnyagire [tiːɲaɡíɾe] "I did not kidnap" is permissible.
- CGV (e.g. enwa [éːnwa] "wasps")
- NCGV (e.g. embwa [éːmbwa] "dog")
  - Note that C (consonant) includes other nasal consonants, thus tinnywire [tiːɲwíɾe] "I did not drink" is permissible.

Note that since these rules only apply to native Tooro words, loanwords like Kristo "Christ" may break them.

== Orthography ==
Tooro uses the same orthography as Nyoro.

Tooro orthography
a	aa	b	bb	c	d	e	ee	f	g	h	i	ii	j	k	l
/a/	/aː/	/β/	/b/	/tʃ/	/d/	/e/	/eː/	/f/	/g/	/h/	/i/	/iː/	/dʒ/	/k/	/l/
m	n (Note: /nj/ is written as ⟨ni⟩ in all contexts (e.g. okunia [okúnja] "to defecate").)	ny (Note: /ɲː/ (normally pronounced [ɲ], but still lengthens the vowel before it) is written as ⟨nny⟩ in all contexts (e.g. okunnyaga [okuˑɲáɡa] "to kidnap me").)	o	oo	p	r	rr	s	t	u	uu	v	w	y	z
/m/	/n/	/ɲ/	/o/	/oː/	/p/	/ɾ/	/r/	/s/	/t/	/u/	/uː/	/v/	/w/	/j/	/z/

Vowel hiatus resolution between words is not indicated in the orthography, except for some short words like na "and", -a "of" or nka "approximately" (e.g. okusoma ekitabu [okusóm‿eːkitáβu] "to read a book"; ky'abantu [c‿aβáːntu] "of (class 7) the people"). Doubled vowels are not used in environments where vowel lengthening can be easily predicted (e.g. in a penultimate syllable before a nasal cluster). Tone is not represented in the orthography.

== Grammar ==
=== Noun classes ===
Like most Bantu languages, Tooro has noun classes, shown in the table below (augment vowels in brackets).

Tooro noun classes
Class number	Prefix	Typical meaning(s)	Example
1	(o)mu-	Humans	omuntu "person"
1a	∅-	Kinship terms, foreign professions (subclass of class 1)	nyoko "your mother"
2	(a)ba-	Plural of class 1	abantu "people"
2a	(∅)baa-	Plural of class 1a (subclass of class 2)	baanyoko "your mothers"
3	(o)mu-	Plants	omuti "tree"
4	(e)mi-	Plural of class 3	emiti "trees"
5	(e)ri-, (Note: Without the augment, ri- is realised as li- [li-].) (e)i- (Note: With the augment, ei- is realised as i- [iː-].)	Body parts, solid objects, places, abstract nouns	eriiso "eye"
6	(a)ma-	Plural of class 5, class 15 and sometimes class 14, liquids (mass nouns)	amaiso "eyes"
7	(e)ki-	Inanimate objects, tools, augmentatives	ekitabu "book", "bed"
8	(e)bi-	Plural of class 7	ebitabu "books", "beds"
9	(e)n-, (e)∅-, ∅-	Animals, abstract nouns, loanwords	embuzi "goat"
10	(e)n-, (e)∅-	Plural of class 9 and class 11	endimi "tongues"
11	(o)ru-	Languages, abstract nouns, augmentatives	orulimi "tongue"
12	(a)ka-	Abstract nouns, diminutives	akame "rabbit, hare"
13	(o)tu-	Plural diminutives	otume "small rabbits"
14	(o)bu-	Abstract nouns, kingdoms, plural of class 12, sometimes singular of class 6	obume "rabbits, hares"
15	(o)ku-	Infinitives, verbal nouns	okulya "eating, to eat"
16	(a)ha- (Note: ha-, when it forms adverbial locative nouns, is never used with an augment.)	Locatives (on)	ahantu "place"
17 (Note: Class 17 is no longer productive.)	(o)ku-	Locatives (way, path), adverbs	kubi "badly, in a bad way", kunu "this way"
18	(o)mu- (Note: If used with an augment, class 18 implies a definite noun. If used without one, it implies an indefinite noun, Compare omutauni 'in the town' with mutauni 'in a town, in town'.)	Locatives (in)	omunju "in the house"
(19)	(e)i-	?	enyuma/enyima "underside"

A noun is made augmentless (i.e. without an augment, equivalent to the base state in Luganda) in these circumstances:

- If the noun is preceded by the class 16 locative ha- or the class 18 locative (o)mu- (e.g. omunju "in the house" < enju "house")
- If the noun is preceded by the nya- "the aforementioned" (e.g. nyamukazi "the aforementioned woman" < omukazi "woman")
- In proper nouns, including personal names (e.g. Buyudaaya "Judea", Ruhanga "God, Ruhanga", Kisembo (personal name) < ekisembo "gift, present")
- If the noun is used as a predicate, regardless of whether a verb is present (e.g. tuli baana "we are children", baana "they are children", ekisani liiso "the drawing is an eye (i.e. the drawing is of an eye)")
- If the noun is a direct object for negative transitive verbs (e.g. talya bitooke "he/she doesn't eat bananas")

Compare the following examples:

- ekitabu "book"
- kitabu "it is a book"
- kinu ekitabu "this book"
- kinu kitabu "this is a book"

=== Pronouns ===
==== Independent pronouns ====
Person/Class	singular	plural
1st person	nyowe, nye (Note: nye is optionally used after a monosyllabic word such as na, nka or ni 'it is' (e.g. ni nye "it's me").)	itwe
2nd person	iwe	inywe
3rd person/Cl. 1/2	uwe	bo
Class 3/4	gwo	yo
Class 5/6	ryo	go
Class 7/8	kyo	byo
Class 9/10	yo	zo
Class 11/10	rwo	(zo)
Class 12/14	ko	bwo
Class 13	N/A	two
Class 15/6	kwo	(go)
Class 16	ho	N/A

==== Relative pronouns ====
Class	singular	plural
Class 1/2	ou	aba
Class 3/4	ogu	ei
Class 5/6	eri	aga
Class 7/8	eki	ebi
Class 9/10	ei	ezi
Class 11/10	oru	(ezi)
Class 12/14	aka	obu
Class 13	N/A	otu
Class 15/6	oku	(aga)
Class 16	aha	N/A

=== Pronominal concords ===
Possessive pronouns and some other words like -a "of" and -ndi "another" are inflected depending on the noun class of the noun being qualified:

Tooro subject/pronominal concord prefixes
Class number	Prefix (before a consonant)	Prefix (before a vowel)	Example (-ange, "my")
1	o-	w-	wange
2	ba-	b-	bange
3	gu-	gw-	gwange
4	e-	y-	yange
5	li-	ly-	lyange
6	ga-	g-	gange
7	ki-	ky-	kyange
8	bi-	by-	byange
9	e-	y-	yange
10	zi-	z-	zange
11	ru-	rw-	rwange
12	ka-	k-	kange
14	bu-	bw-	bwange
15	ku-	kw-	kwange
16	ha-	h-	hange

These words support augments. For possessive pronouns, the augment conveys the meaning of "own" (e.g. omwana owange "my own child", instead of omwana wange "my child, any of my children"). For other words, it conveys definiteness (e.g. embuzi eya Bagonza "the house of Bagonza" instead of embuzi ya Bagonza "a house of Bagonza").

=== Demonstratives ===
Demonstratives in Tooro can optionally be placed before or after the noun (e.g. omuntu onu / onu omuntu "this person").

Tooro demonstratives
Noun class	Proximal (this)	Mesioproximal (that near you)	Mesiodistal (that over there, rather near)	Distal (that over there, rather far away)
1	onu	ogu		oli
2	banu	abo		bali
3	gunu	ogu		guli
4	enu	egi	egyo	eri
5	linu	eri	eryo	liri
6	ganu	ago		gali
7	kinu	eki	ekyo	kiri
8	binu	ebi	ebyo	biri
9	enu	egi	egyo	eri
10	zinu	ezi	ezo	ziri
11	runu	oru		ruli
12	kanu	ako		kali
13	tunu	otu		tuli
14	bunu	obu		buli
15	kunu	oku		kuli
16	hanu	aho		hali
17	kunu	oku		kuli
18	munu	omu		muli

Classes 16 and 17 are used as adverbs (i.e. hanu means "here", kunu "this way", hali "there", kuli "that way")

=== Verbs ===
Tooro, like all Rutara languages, is a heavily agglutinative language, with verbs needing to agree with the tense, mood, subject and object in class and number.

ti-ba-ka-ki-mu-h-es-er-a-yo-ga
NEG-3PL.SM-REM.PST-CL7.DOM-3SG.IOM-give-CAUS-APL-FV-LOC-HAB
They have never caused it (class 7) to be given to him/her over there.

The morphological structure of a Tooro verb is:

Tooro morphological verb slots
1	2	3	4	5		6	7	8			9	10
1	2	3	4	5a	5b	6	7	8a	8b	8c	9	10
"Actualizers": ni-, ti-	Subject markers	-ta-	Tense-aspect-mood: -ka-, -a-, -(r)aa-, -ri-, -kya-, -ku-	Direct object markers	Indirect object markers	Verb root	Verb derivation suffixes (except -i-, -u-)	-ir- (perfective)	-i-, -u-	Final vowel: -a, -e	Clitics: -mu, -ho, -yo	-ga -ge

==== Subject markers ====
Tooro subject markers
Person/Class	Prefix	Person/Class	Prefix
1st per. sg.	n-	1st per. pl.	tu-
2nd per. sg.	o-	2nd per. pl.	mu-
3rd per. sg./Cl. 1	a-	3rd per. sg./Cl. 2	ba-
Class 3	gu-	Class 4	e-
Class 5	li-	Class 6	ga-
Class 7	ki-	Class 8	bi-
Class 9	e-	Class 10	zi-
Class 11	ru-	(Class 10)	(zi-)
Class 12	ka-	Class 14	bu-
N/A	N/A	Class 13	tu-
Class 15	ku-	(Class 6)	(ga-)
Class 16	ha-	N/A	N/A

Note the similarity to the subject concord prefixes. only class 1, 4 and 9 differ.

==== Object markers ====
Tooro object markers
Person/Class	Prefix	Person/Class	Prefix
1st per. sg.	-n-	1st per. pl.	-tu-
2nd per. sg.	-ku-	2nd per. pl.	-ba-
3rd per. sg./Cl. 1	-mu-	3rd per. sg./Cl. 2	-ba-
Class 3	-gu-	Class 4	-gi-
Class 5	-li-	Class 6	-ga-
Class 7	-ki-	Class 8	-bi-
Class 9	-gi-	Class 10	-zi-
Class 11	-ru-	(Class 10)	(-zi-)
Class 12	-ka-	Class 14	-bu-
N/A	N/A	Class 13	-tu-
Class 15	-ku-	(Class 6)	(-ga-)
Class 16	-ha-	N/A	N/A
Reflexive	-e-	N/A	N/A

Note the similarity to the subject markers, only class 1, 4 and 9 differ.

The object markers are used for direct and indirect objects. The indirect object marker comes before the direct object marker:

a-ka-ki-mu-h-a
3SG-REM.PST-CL7-3SG-give-FV
he/she gave it (class 7) to him/her

If the object marker is used with an object noun, the noun is made definite. Compare the following examples:

- Ndisoma ekihandiiko. ("I will read a document.")
- Ndikisoma ekihandiiko. ("I will read the document.")

==== Verb derivation suffixes ====
Tooro has a lot of derivational affixes for verbs, most of them exhibiting mid vowel harmony.

Tooro verb derivation suffixes
Prefix		Meaning	Example	
after /a, i, u/	after /e, o/	Meaning	after /a, i, u/	after /e, o/
-ir	-er	applicative suffix	okucumbira "to cook for someone" < okucumba "to cook"	okutemera "to cut (using a machete/axe) for someone" < okutema "to cut (using a machete/axe)"
-is	-es	instrumental, causative suffix	okucumbisa "to cook using something, to make someone cook" < okucumba	okutemesa "to cut using something, to make someone cut" < okutema
-i (Note: -i is always placed immediately before the final vowel of a verb (e.g. bagondeze < ba-gond-er-i-e "they loved") except if a verb whose root ends in /t/ has the -ir suffix (applicative or perfective). In this case, -i is inserted twice: once before the root, and again before the final vowel (e.g. okurooseza < o-ku-root-i-er-i-a "to cause to dream for").)		causative suffix	okucumbya "to cause to cook" < okucumba	
-u, -ibw (after /j/, /w/, /s/, /z/)		passive suffix	okucumbwa "to be cooked" < okucumba, okuliibwa "to be eaten" < okulya "to eat"	
-uːr	-oːr	transitive suffix	okuhumbuura "to revive (tr.)" < okuhumba (not used)	okuhomoora "to detach"
-uːk	-oːk	intransitive suffix	okuhumbuuka "to revive (intr.)" < okuhumba	okuhomooka "to come off"
-ur, -urr	-or, -orr	reversive transitive suffix	okuhabura "to put someone in the right way" < okuhaba "to get lost", okuzingurra "to disentangle" < okuzinga "to wind up, to entangle"	okusoborra "to untangle"
-uk, -uruk	-ok, -orok	reversive intransitive suffix	okuhabuka "to come back from the wrong way" < okuhaba, okuzinguruka "to become disentangled" < okuzinga	okusoboroka "to become untangled"
-ik	-ek	stative, positional transitive suffix		okuhendeka "to have a bone broken" < okuhenda "to break (tr.)"
-an, -angan		associative suffix	okutomeran(gan)a "to collide with each other" < okutomera "to collide"	
-ar		intransitive suffix	okusigara "to remain" < okusiga "to leave (tr.)"	
-am		positional intransitive suffix	okusitama "to squat" < okusita (not used)	
-iriz	-erez	insistent suffix		okuhondereza "to follow someone wherever they go" < okuhonda "to follow"
-iːriz	-eːrez	repetitive suffix		okusekeereza "to laugh repeatedly" < okuseka "to laugh"
-aniz		repetitive suffix	okulengesaniza "to imitate repeatedly" < okulengesa "to imitate"	
-irr	-err	intensive suffix	okwanguhirra "to be very light/easy" < okwanguha "to be light/easy"	

Reduplication is also used for some verbs (e.g. okutematema "to cut into small pieces using a machete").

==== Verb conjugations ====
Below are some verb conjugations in Tooro with examples that use the subject marker n- "I" and the verb root √-gend- "go". Perfective -ir is subject to mid vowel harmony and causes consonant mutation. Note that SM stands for "subject marker" and RT stands for "root".

Tooro verb conjugations
Aspect ↘		Completives			Incompletives		
Tense ↓		Performative	Perfective	Retrospective	Habitual	Progressive	Continuative
Remote past	Affirmative	SM-ka-RT-a nkagenda "I went (before yesterday)"	SM-ka-ba SM-a-RT-a nkaba nagenda "I had gone (before yesterday)"	SM-ka-ba SM-RT-ir-e nkaba ngenzire "I had already gone (before yesterday)"	SM-a-RT-a-ga nagendaga "I used to go"	SM-ka-ba ni-SM-RT-a nkaba ningenda "I was going (before yesterday)"	SM-ka-ba ni-SM-kya-RT-a nkaba ninkyagenda "I was still going (before yesterday)"
Remote past	Negative	SM-ta-RT-e ntagende "I didn't go (before yesterday)"	SM-ka-ba SM-ta-ka-RT-ir-e nkaba ntakagenzire "I hadn't gone (before yesterday)"	SM-ka-ba SM-ta-(ka-)RT-ir-e nkaba nta(ka)genzire "I hadn't already gone (before yesterday)"	ti-SM-a-RT-a-ga tinagendaga "I used to not go"	SM-ka-ba SM-ta-ku-RT-a nkaba ntakugenda "I wasn't going (before yesterday)"	SM-ka-ba SM-ta-kya-RT-a nkaba ntakyagenda "I wasn't still going (before yesterday)"
Near past	Affirmative	SM-RT-ir-e-ge ngenzirege "I went (today/yesterday)"	SM-ba-ir-e SM-a-RT-a mbaire nagenda "I had gone (today/yesterday)"	SM-ba-ir-e SM-RT-ir-e mbaire ngenzire "I had already gone (today/yesterday)"	SM-a-RT-a-ga nagendaga "I used to go"	SM-ba-ir-e ni-SM-RT-a mbaire ningenda "I was going (today/yesterday)"	SM-ba-ir-e ni-SM-kya-RT-a mbaire ninkyagenda "I was still going (today/ yesterday)"
Near past	Negative	ti-SM-RT-ir-e-ge tingenzirege "I didn't go (today/yesterday)"	SM-ba-ir-e SM-ta-ka-RT-ir-e mbaire ntakagenzire "I hadn't gone (today/yesterday)"	SM-ba-ir-e SM-ta-(ka-)RT-ir-e mbaire nta(ka)genzire "I hadn't already gone (today/yesterday)"	ti-SM-a-RT-a-ga tinagendaga "I used to not go"	SM-ba-ir-e SM-ta-ku-RT-a mbaire ntakugenda "I wasn't going (today/yesterday)"	SM-ba-ir-e SM-ta-kya-RT-a mbaire ntakyagenda "I wasn't still going (today/yesterday)"
"Memorial present" (Note: This tense is also used to describe a past event which occurred after another one, sometimes called the 'narrative past'.)	Affirmative	SM-a-RT-a nagenda "I just went (a moment ago)"	SM-a-ba SM-a-RT-a naba nagenda "I had just gone (a moment ago)"	SM-a-ba SM-RT-ir-e naba ngenzire "I had already just gone (a moment ago)"	SM-RT-a ngenda "I go"	SM-a-ba ni-SM-RT-a naba ningenda "I was just going (a moment)"	SM-a-ba ni-SM-kya-RT-a naba ninkyagenda "I was still going (a moment ago)"
"Memorial present"	Negative	ti-SM-a-RT-a tinagenda "I didn't go (a moment ago)"	SM-a-ba SM-ta-ka-RT-ir-e naba ntakagenzire "I hadn't just gone (a moment ago)"	SM-a-ba SM-ta-(ka-)RT-ir-e naba nta(ka)genzire "I hadn't already just gone (a moment ago)"	ti-SM-RT-a tingenda "I don't go"	SM-a-ba SM-ta-ku-RT-a naba ntakugenda "I wasn't just going (a moment ago)"	SM-a-ba SM-ta-kya-RT-a naba ntakyagenda "I wasn't still going (a moment ago)"
"Experience perfective"	Affirmative	N/A	SM-ra-RT-ir-e ndagenzire "I have at some point gone"	N/A	N/A	N/A	N/A
"Experience perfective"	Negative	N/A	ti-SM-ka-RT-a-ga tinkagendaga "I have never gone"	N/A	N/A	N/A	N/A
"Sufficient perfective"	Affirmative	N/A	SM-a-RT-ir-e nagenzire "I have sufficiently gone, I have gone enough"	N/A	N/A	N/A	N/A
"Sufficient perfective"	Negative	N/A	ti-SM-RT-ir-e e-ki-ku-mar-a tingenzire ekikumara "I haven't gone enough"	N/A	N/A	N/A	N/A
Present	Affirmative	(ni-SM-RT-a) (ningenda "I am going")	SM-a-RT-a nagenda "I have just gone"	SM-RT-ir-e ngenzire "I have already gone"	SM-RT-a ngenda "I go"	ni-SM-RT-a ningenda "I am going"	ni-SM-kya-RT-a ninkyagenda "I am still going"
Present	Negative	(ti-SM-(ru-)ku-RT-a) (tin(du)kugenda "I am not going")	ti-SM-a-RT-a tinagenda "I haven't just gone"	ti-SM-(ka-)RT-ir-e tin(ka)genzire "I haven't already gone"	ti-SM-RT-a tingenda "I don't go"	ti-SM-(ru-)ku-RT-a tin(du)kugenda "I am not going"	ti-SM-kya-RT-a tinkyagenda "I am still not going"
Near future	Affirmative	SM-raa-RT-a ndaagenda "I will go (today/tomorrow)"	SM-raa-ba SM-a-RT-a ndaaba nagenda "I will have gone (today/tomorrow)"	SM-raa-ba SM-RT-ir-e ndaaba ngenzire "I will have already gone (today/tomorrow)"	SM-raa-RT-a-ga ndaagendaga "I will always go"	SM-raa-ba ni-SM-RT-a ndaaba ningenda "I will be going (today/tomorrow)"	SM-raa-ba ni-SM-kya-RT-a ndaaba ninkyagenda "I will still be going (today/tomorrow)"
Near future	Negative	ti-SM-aa-RT-e tinaagende "I won't go (today/tomorrow)"	SM-daa-ba SM-ta-ka-RT-ir-e ndaaba ntakagenzire "I won't have gone (today/tomorrow)"	SM-raa-ba SM-ta-(ka-)RT-ir-e ndaaba nta(ka)genzire "I won't have already gone (today/tomorrow)"	ti-SM-aa-RT-e-ge tinaagendege "I won't always go"	SM-raa-ba SM-ta-ku-RT-a ndaaba ntakugenda "I won't be going (today/tomorrow)"	SM-raa-ba SM-ta-kya-RT-a ndaaba ntakyagenda "I won't still be going (today/tomorrow)"
Remote future	Affirmative	SM-ri-RT-a ndigenda "I will go (after tomorrow)"	SM-ri-ba SM-a-RT-a ndiba nagenda "I will have gone (after tomorrow)"	SM-ri-ba SM-RT-ir-e ndiba ngenzire "I will have already gone (after tomorrow)"	SM-raa-RT-a-ga ndaagendaga "I will always go"	SM-ri-ba ni-SM-RT-a ndiba ningenda "I will be going (after tomorrow)"	SM-ri-ba ni-SM-kya-RT-a ndiba ninkyagenda "I will still be going (after tomorrow)"
Remote future	Negative	ti-SM-ri-RT-a tindigenda "I won't go (after tomorrow)"	SM-ri-ba SM-ta-ka-RT-ir-e ndiba ntakagenzire "I won't have gone (after tomorrow)"	SM-ri-ba SM-ta-(ka-)RT-ir-e ndiba nta(ka)genzire "I won't have already gone (after tomorrow)"	ti-SM-aa-RT-e-ge tinaagendege "I won't always go"	SM-ri-ba SM-ta-ku-RT-a ndiba ntakugenda "I won't be going (after tomorrow)"	SM-ri-ba SM-ta-kya-RT-a ndiba ntakyagenda "I won't still be going (after tomorrow)"
Irrealis moods
Imperative		RT-a Genda! "Go!"					
Prohibitive	Singular	o-ta-RT-a Otagenda! "Don't go!"					
Prohibitive	Plural	mu-ta-RT-a Mutagenda! "Don't go!"					
Subjunctive	Affirmative	SM-RT-e ngende "I should go, I may go"					
Subjunctive	Negative	SM-ta-RT-a ntagenda "I shouldn't go, I may not go"					
Subjunctive habitual	Affirmative	SM-RT-e-ge ngendege "I should always go, I should keep going"					
Subjunctive habitual	Negative	SM-ta-RT-a-ga ntagendaga "I shouldn't keep going"					
Hortative	Affirmative	ka SM-RT-e ka ngende "let me go"					
Hortative	Negative	ka SM-ta-ku-RT-a ka ntakugenda "don't let me go"					
Hypothetical	Affirmative	SM-aa-ku-RT-a naakugenda "I can go"					
Hypothetical	Negative	ti-SM-aa-ku-RT-a tinaakugenda "I can't go"					
Conditional	Affirmative	SM-aa-ku-RT-ir-e naakugenzire "I would have gone, I would go"					
Conditional	Negative	ti-SM-aa-ku-RT-ir-e tinaakugenzire "I wouldn't have gone, I wouldn't go"					

=== Numbers ===
In Tooro, the numbers 1 to 5 are numerical adjectives that need to agree with the noun they qualify, whereas the numbers 6 to 10 are numerical nouns that do not agree with the qualified noun. For abstract counting, the class 10 inflection of the numerical adjective is used. 20 to 50, 200 to 500 and 2000 to 5000 are expressed using the plural of 10, 100 and 1000 respectively with the cardinal numbers for 2 to 5. 60 to 100, 600 to 1000 and 6000 to 10,000 are numerical nouns derived from the same roots as 6 to 10.

Tooro numbers (1–10,000)
1–5	6–10 (class 3/5)	10–50	60–100 (class 9/7)	100–500	600–1000 (class 11)	1000–5000	6000–10,000 (class 12)
1 – -mu	6 – mukaaga	(10 – ikumi)	60 – nkaaga	(100 – kikumi)	600 – rukaaga	(1000 – rukumi)	6000 – kakaaga
2 – -biri	7 – musanju	20 – (makumi) abiri	70 – nsanju	200 – (bikumi) bibiri	700 – rusanju	2000 – nkumi ibiri	7000 – kasanju
3 – -satu	8 – munaana	30 – (makumi) asatu	80 – kinaana	300 – (bikumi) bisatu	800 – runaana	3000 – nkumi isatu	8000 – kanaana
4 – -na	9 – mwenda	40 – (makumi) ana	90 – kyenda	400 – (bikumi) bbina	900 – rwenda	4000 – nkumi ina	9000 – kenda
5 – -taano	10 – ikumi	50 – (makumi) ataano	100 – kikumi	500 – (bikumi) bitaano	1000 – rukumi	5000 – nkumi itaano	1000 – kakumi, omutwaro

==== Time-telling ====
In Tooro, time is counted in a 12-hour time convention from sunrise to sunset, with 7:00 am being the first hour of the day and 6:00 pm being the twelfth. Same goes for 7:00pm and 6:00 am respectively. To tell time, use saaha ("hour") + the corresponding number of the hour (equivalent of subtracting 6 from the A.M./P.M. system). The class 16 locative class is used for time (e.g. tukahika hasaaha ikumi "we arrived at four o'clock").

== Greetings (Endamukya) ==
Greetings in Tooro differ depending on number (singular or plural):

- Oraire ota? = "Good morning (sg)" (literally: How did you (sg) spend the night?)
- Muraire muta? = "Good morning (pl)" (literally: How did you (pl) spend the night?)
- Osiibire ota? = "Good afternoon" (literally: How did you (sg) spend the day?)
- Musiibire muta? = "Good afternoon (pl)" (literally: How did you (pl) spend the day?)
- Oiriirwe ota? = "Good evening (sg)" (literally: How did it become dark to you (sg)?)
- Mwiriirwe muta? = "Good evening (pl)" (literally: How did it become dark to you (pl)?)
- Oraale kurungi! = "Good night (sg)" (literally: May you (sg) spend the night well!)
- Muraale kurungi! = "Good night (pl)" (literally: May you (pl) spend the night well!)

== Sample text ==
buli mu-ntu a-ina o-bu-gabe bw-e habw-e rundi o-mu-ki-tebe na=a-ba-ndi ku-twar-a o-mu-ma-iso kandi na=o-kw-ekamb-a ku-lind-a na=o-ku-hikir-iz-a e-by-a=o-bu-gabe bw-a=a-ba-ntu na=o-bu-singe bw-abo kw-e-twar-a ha-ru-lengo rw-a=i-hanga na=o-rw-a=e-n-si y-oona
every CL1-person 3SG-have AUG-CL14-right CL14-3SG.POSS because.of-3SG.POSS or AUG.DEF-CL18.LOC-CL7-group and=AUG-CL2-other CL15.INF-take-FV AUG.DEF-CL18.LOC-CL6-eye and and=AUG-CL15.INF-strive.for-FV CL15.INF-protect-FV and=AUG-CL15.INF-arrive-APPL\CAUS-FV AUG.DEF-CL-GEN=AUG-CL14-right CL14-GEN=AUG-CL2.PL-person and=AUG-CL14-peace CL14-3PL.POSS CL15.INF-REFL-take-FV CL16.LOC-CL11-level CL11-GEN=CL5-nation and=AUG-CL11=AUG-CL9-earth CL9-all
Everyone has the right, individually and in association with others, to promote and to strive for the protection and realization of human rights and fundamental freedoms at the national and international levels.
(Article 1 of the Declaration on the Right and Responsibility of Individuals, Groups and Organs of Society to Promote and Protect Universally Recognized Human Rights and Fundamental Freedoms)

== See also ==
- The list of Tooro words at Wiktionary, a free dictionary and Wikipedia sibling project
- The Tooro Swadesh list, also at Wiktionary
- Runyakitara language
