= Ruuli language =

Bantu language of Uganda

Ruuli
- Luduuli
- Native to: Uganda
- Ethnicity: Baruuli
- Native speakers: 160,000 (2002 census)
- Language family: Niger–Congo?: Atlantic–Congo; Volta-Congo; Benue–Congo; Bantoid; Southern Bantoid; Bantu; Northeast Bantu; Great Lakes Bantu; West Nyanza; Rutara; North Rutara; Ruuli
- Dialects: Nyara

Language codes
- ISO 639-3: ruc
- Glottolog: ruul1235
- Guthrie code: JE.103

Ruuli (also spelled as Ruruuli-Lunyala, Ruli, Luruuri-Lunyara, Ruruli-Lunyara, Ruruli-Runyala, and Luduuli) is the Bantu language spoken by the Baruuli and Banyala people of Uganda primarily in Nakasongola and Kayunga districts. It is closely related to the Nyoro language.

Ruruuli and Lunyala are two major varieties of the language that have approximately ninety percent mutual intelligibility. The Baruuli and Banyala people are considered to be two separate ethnic groups although both communities have very similar cultural practices, for example with names and the nomenclature systems.

== Phonology ==
Ruuli is a tonal language: high and low tones distinguish lexical and grammatical meaning.

=== Consonants ===
There are 21 consonants in the Ruuli.

Consonant Phonemes
	Bilabial	Labio-dental	Alveolar	Palatal	Velar
Plosive	/p/ /b/		/t/ /d/	/c/ /ɟ/	/k/ /g/
Fricative	/β/	/f/ /v/	/s/ /z/		
Trill			/r/		
Lateral			/l/		
Nasal	/m/		/n/	/ɲ/	/ŋ/
Approximant	/w/			/j/	

=== Vowels ===
Ruuli uses five phonemic vowels and all five have a short and long form. The vowels in the Ruuli phonemic inventory are /i/, /u/, /e/, /o/, and /a/.

== Morphology ==
=== Nouns ===
Nouns in Bantu languages usually consist of a nominal prefix and a stem. The prefixes that are attached can be specific to the noun classes that a noun form is attached to, but not all nouns have prefixes that signal noun class. Noun class is ultimately decided by the prefixes on the verbs and adjectives in the clause. Typically Bantu nouns are paired in two class, singular and plural, which can also be referred to as gender, although this may not be the case for all nouns.

=== Adjectives ===
In Bantu languages adjectives use adjectival prefixes to ensure that adjectives and nouns agree within a clause. Adjectives in Bantu languages are not usually "pure" adjectives and many are derived from verbs. There are a few underived adjectives but a majority of the adjectives in Ruuli are derived.
