= Ugandan English =

English dialect native to Uganda

- Kiingereza cha Uganda
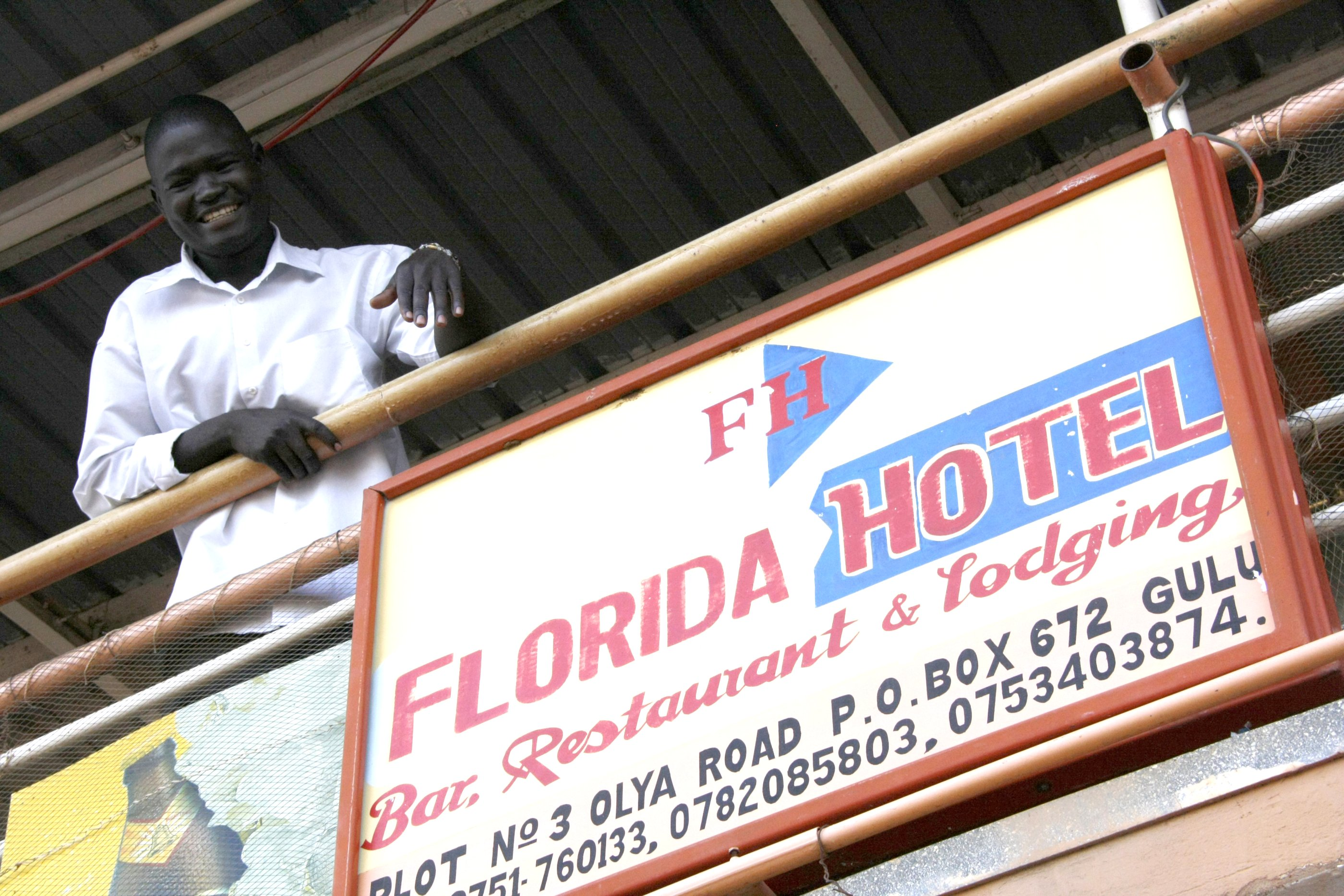
- Region: Uganda
- Language family: Indo-European: Germanic; West Germanic; Ingvaeonic; Anglo-Frisian; Anglic; English; British English & African English; Ugandan English
- Early forms: Proto-Indo-European: Proto-Germanic; Old English; Middle English; Early Modern English; 19th century British English
- Writing system: Latin (English alphabet); Unified English Braille

Official status
- Official language in: Uganda

Language codes
- ISO 639-3: –
- Glottolog: ugan1243
- IETF: en-UG

Ugandan English, also colloquially referred to as Uglish (/ˈjuːɡlɪʃ/ YOO-glish), is the variety of English spoken in Uganda. Aside from Uglish (first recorded in 2012), other colloquial portmanteau words are Uganglish (recorded from 2006) and Ugandlish (2010).

== Influence of indigenous languages ==
The phonological characteristics of Ugandan indigenous languages significantly influence the pronunciation patterns of Ugandan English. The country's linguistic diversity enables speakers familiar with the region to discern an individual's ethnolinguistic background through their English pronunciation patterns.

In the Bantu languages of southern Uganda, particularly notable is their syllabic structure, which prohibits isolated consonants without accompanying vowels. In Luganda, for instance, the metalinguistic term for consonant literally translates to "silent letter". This phonological constraint results in epenthetic vowel insertion, whereby the name Alfred /ˈælfrɛd/ undergoes vowel epenthesis to become /ˈalufuredi/. Similarly, muscular is realized as /ˈmusicular/.

Luganda exhibits specific phonotactic constraints regarding liquid consonants: the rhotic /r/ never occurs word-initially and is restricted to post-vocalic positions following front vowels /e/ and /i/. Conversely, the lateral /l/ is prohibited in these environments. This complementary distribution affects loanword adaptation, transforming railway into /leyirwe/.

Another distinctive feature of Luganda phonology is the prohibition of the sequence /kju/, which undergoes palatalization to /tʃu/. Consequently, cute is phonetically realized as /tʃut/.

In contrast, speakers of Runyankole and Rukiga demonstrate different phonological patterns. These languages readily accommodate word-initial rhotics but have limited occurrence of the lateral /l/. Additionally, they exhibit a tendency toward postalveolar fricatives, often realizing /s/ as /ʃ/. The cumulative effect of these phonological rules results in transformations such as calcium being pronounced as /karuʃim/.

== Vocabulary and idioms ==
Some words in Ugandan English have unique meanings widely understood within Uganda but unknown to foreigners. The best known example is probably to extend, which in Uganda means "to move aside" or "to create space for someone else to sit". Another example, pop, is used to replace words such as bring and come, for example: "Danny, pop that bottle here" or "Heno, pop to my house". The origins of some of these words' usages may be obscure.

=== Buildings ===
godown
A basement. It can also mean a warehouse or storage area, often used for goods in transit, derived from Malay gudang. The standard English term warehouse is also known in Uganda.
hotel
A restaurant found in a small town.

=== Clothing ===
put on
To dress, to be dressed or to wear. For example, "That lady is rich, don't you see how she is putting on?" and "The police are looking for a man putting on a red shirt."

=== Communication ===
beeped, flashed
To ring up the intended recipient of a call and hang up immediately, indicating that the caller wishes to talk at the receiver's expense. The receiver understands themselves to have been beeped or flashed, based on the brief flashing of the screen. This is common in Uganda due to the prevalence of prepaid mobile phone services.

=== Education ===
facilitation
In Uganda, it means paying someone for attending a meeting or event, often covering expenses and providing additional compensation. This contrasts with the European or US meaning, which focuses on helping organise progress without financial compensation.

=== Family members ===
cousin
In Uganda, this term is used to refer to any close relative, including siblings, aunts, uncles and even close family friends. Thus, the terms cousin brother or cousin sister are used to identify the "close" cousins.
dependant
A child who is not the biological offspring of the family with whom the child lives. Sometimes, dependants are referred to as sons, daughters, nephews or nieces. The high number of children orphaned by AIDS and poverty combined with the communal culture of Uganda leads to an extremely high number of dependents and a great deal of confusion for an outsider trying to determine biological family structure.
sibling
In Uganda, this term can also used to refer to cousins, especially those who are close in age. This usage is common in many Ugandan languages, where the concept of family extends beyond immediate siblings.

=== Food and farming ===
take a beverage
To drink a beverage, such as water, soda or beer.
chai
Another word for all kinds of tea.
chips
French fries, as in British English.
digging
A common word to refer to farming.
garden
A field under cultivation, including large fields. This is a direct translation from several Ugandan languages.
Irish potatoes
Potatoes in general. By itself, potatoes refers to sweet potatoes.
macrons
Spaghetti, which is generally fried in oil.
ovacado, vacado
Avocado, a common fruit in Uganda.
pop
A soda, such as Coca-Cola or Fanta, similar to regional American English.
posho
A dense mixture of cooked cornmeal and water, similar to ugali.
sukuma wiki
Collard greens, a common vegetable in Uganda.

=== Language ===
vernacular
Commonly used to refer to local languages, as opposed to English. It originates from the practice in primary schools of punishing students for speaking their local languages, which are often referred to as "vernacular". This usage is not common in other English-speaking countries, which may use other derogatory terms such as "dialect" instead.

=== Money ===
bounce
In American and British English, a dishonoured check is said to "bounce". In Uganda, this phrase has been adopted to refer to the failure to meet with someone, with or without an appointment: "I came to your place and bounced."
demand
In Uganda, the verb demand is often used in place of owe, with inversion of subject and object. For example, "I demand John ten thousand shillings" means "John owes me ten thousand shillings".
eating money
A phrase used to describe the act of spending money, especially in a lavish or extravagant manner. It is derived from the idea that when one spends money, they are "eating" it, as if consuming it. This phrase is widely used in Uganda and has several connotations. It is also a common phrase in reference to embezzlement, corruption, or misappropriation of funds: "The Minister ate the money," or "He was fired from his job because he ate money." This phrase also applies to living a lavish or abundant lifestyle, hence "You are eating money", which commonly means one is successful and doing well.
forex
Foreign currency, and currency exchange bureaus are referred to as forex bureaux.
house
When out with friends for drinks or shopping, if someone pays the bill, they are said to have "housed" the group. For example, "We went out with Kenneth last night and he housed us" means "Kenneth paid for the drinks".
terms for shillings
Due to the high exchange rate to other currencies, in Uganda, 1000 shillings is referred to as "1k", 2000 shillings as "2k", and so on. For example, "Lend me some 10k Marvin" means "Lend me 10,000 shillings Marvin."

=== Quality ===
fake
A word used to describe something that is not genuine or authentic. For example, if one's friend went on an exciting evening out without inviting the other friend, one might hear the latter complain, saying "Eeh, you man, you are fake!"
somehow
A frequently interspered word used to mean "slightly" or "occasionally". It can also imply doubt or uncertainty. When one is asked if they liked the food, and they enjoyed it slightly, they could simply reply "somehow".

=== Religion ===
pagan
Individuals who would be referred to elsewhere as atheists and agnostics are referred to as pagans, often used to describe those who do not adhere to Christianity.
save-dee
A person who has found God, often referred to in other English-speaking countries as "being saved".

=== Social interactions ===
congs
Short for "congratulations".
lost
Used to mean that one has not seen the person in a long time. It can also be used to signal a transition. For instance, if a person is preparing to leave, he might break a moment of silence with "ok please" and then announce that he is leaving. "Thank you please" has a similar meaning but can also mean thank you. "Please" never means please. If Ugandans want something, they say "You give me..." Please is not required; the tone of the voice is normally enough to convey politeness.
wel be back
A bastardised way of saying "welcome back", used much more commonly than the standard phrase.

=== Transport and directions ===
bodaboda
A motorbike or bicycle used for the same purpose as a taxi. The term originated at the Uganda–Kenya border crossing at Busia, where a kilometre separates the downtown area from the border post on the Ugandan side. Travellers dropped off at the bus/taxi station by buses or taxis, or those coming to Uganda from the Kenya side, were ferried over this distance by enterprising cyclists, who would attract business by calling "border, border".
branch
To turn.
captain
The title applied to all pilots, not just those in command of a plane. Pilot is often used to refer to the driver of a bus, (minivan) taxi or "special hire".
foot
To walk.
give someone a push
To accompany a person home for some distance.
means
Forms of transport. For instance: "I could not reach the party last night; I had no means."
sleep outside
When a car "sleeps" outside, it means it stays outside, not in the compound or in the garage.
slope
To go in a particular direction which is not necessarily downhill.
taxi
A van used like a bus, carrying many persons along a fixed route. A taxi taking one passenger at a time on a negotiable route is referred to as a special hire.

=== Witchcraft ===
nightdancer
A person who has been possessed by a spirit, causing them to dance naked in the wee hours of the night, often defecating and smearing human excrement on people's door posts. This term is used throughout Uganda, regardless of tribal origin, and has become synonymous with witch doctors, as they are usually possessed by these spirits. It can also refer to cannibals, although this is not a common practice. For example, a parent may say, "You will become a nightdancer" to a child who is biting their fingernails, implying that the child may eventually start eating human flesh instead of just fingernails.
witch doctor
A practitioner of witchcraft, often used interchangeably with nightdancer. The term is not a direct translation from any Ugandan language, but it is widely understood in Uganda. It can also refer to practitioners of local medicines, such as herbal medicines.

=== Miscellaneous ===
downer
Often used in place of lower, used in opposition to upper. For example: "I broke my upper leg, but my downer leg was paining, too."
enjoy
In the dialect of English used in Karamoja, to enjoy can be used as "to be married to", as in the sentence, "I used to enjoy Narot but now, since the divorce, I am enjoying Nakoto."
ever
Used to mean "often", in the same way "always" is used in American English. It is the opposite of the exaggeration "never". For example, if someone is often late, a Ugandan might say "She is ever late."
gas
In some scenarios, used to denote physical strength as opposed to an air like fluid or gasoline. Example: I have no gas to read for the exam.
just
Often used at the end of the statement to express obviousness. Example: During a phone call, one would tell a friend, "I am at home eating food, just."
mob
A large number of people or things. In Uganda, the word mob does not necessarily denote a large unruly crowd of people but can also be used to mean objects. In some contexts, to Ugandans, mob can mean "a lot" or "a significant amount". For example, There are mob people in that building means that there are a lot of people in the building. The people represented in the example do not have to be unruly to be referred to as a mob. Another example, We have mob food here means we have a lot of food.
monologue
The Broadway play The Vagina Monologues had a brief, but notorious, appearance on the Ugandan stage before being banned by government censors. The brouhaha led to the entry of the word monologue into Ugandan English as a euphemism for vagina.
pain
Often used in place of hurt. For example: "My leg is paining" means "My leg hurts."
paper
Refers to an exam among students. One can normally hear Ugandan students exclaiming, "The paper was hard!" to mean that the exam was difficult.
proggie
Commonly used among younger people when referring to one's social plans, e.g. "Susan, what's your proggie for the weekend, let's hook up."
sorry
Often used in a unique way in Uganda. The traditional meaning of expressing sympathy and sadness for something undesirable that has happened to someone is used, such as "Oh, sorry" or "I'm sorry". However, in England direct use like this is now usually an expression of regret with some responsibility attached – a form of apology. If they were not involved and just mean to express sympathy, they are likely to be less direct – "I'm sorry to hear that" or "that's really sad", or "that's terrible".
vuvuzela
A vagina, popularised after the 2010 World Cup.
whole
Used to emphasise disapproval of conduct unbecoming a person's rank or station. Examples: "How can a whole Minister go to that cheap nightclub?" or "How can a whole headmaster dress so badly?" The usage is a direct translation from several Ugandan languages.
whopper
A penis, also popularised after the 2010 World Cup.
zibbs
Often used to refer to problems. Example: "I failed the exam, now those are other zibbs." This term originates from the Luganda word for problems, ebizibu.

== Borrowed terms ==
Ugandan words are often inserted into English because the English equivalent does not convey the sense the Ugandan speaker intends.

The standard English term brother-in-law applies to both a spouse's brother and a spouse's sister's husband. A man's relationship with these two entails two quite different sets of obligations and norms in Ugandan society. Thus, Luganda speakers will often use muko (wife's brother) and musangi (literally "one you met", meaning you met at the girl's home while wooing her) to make the distinction.

Sometimes only a prefix is borrowed. In Luganda the prefix ka- before a noun denotes smallness. A Member of Parliament, referring to a 5-foot-tall (1.5 m) Finance Minister, said in a debate "the ka-man is innocent." Ka-child and ka-thing are also common. Thus, in most cases it is used to refer to the size of an object. For example, many cell phones in Uganda have torches, as an accessory of the phones. Ugandans refer to this light as the "katorchi" since the light emitted from the phone comes from a small bulb at the top. But it can also be diminutive, such as in the case when a woman is telling her friends how she was bothered by an overly flirtatious young man on the taxi, "Eh! this ka-boy really disturbed me on the taxi. He would not stop asking for my number." Here the ka is used not so much to refer to whether or not the boy was short or tall, but rather as a way to reflect how he bothered her. Ka-timba, however, in the context of building construction refers to a thin piece of steel (such as re-bar), rather than the wood which one might expect. On the other hand, akatimba (obutimba, plural) is the name for a mosquito net. Thus, as is common in Uganda, one word will have multiple, if not numerous, meanings depending on the context in which it is used, as will the prefixes.

The Luganda conjunction nti is often slipped into English sentences instead of that. Thus, one will hear a quotation like "The Minister said nti corruption will not be tolerated." If the speaker is skeptical, he will use mbu instead of nti: "The Minister said mbu corruption will not be tolerated" implies that it is just talk; business will go on as usual.

In some Ugandan languages, the same verb can be used to express thanks, congratulations, and appreciation of a job well done. It is normal for an African working in his own garden to be thanked for his work by a passing stranger. If one buys a new car in Uganda, or wins a race, one should not be surprised to find themselves being thanked.

People are also thanked early in the morning as a form of greeting. Therefore, a Luganda speaker may translate "gyebale" by saying "well done". They are just greeting others by way of thanking them for their usual work, not necessarily for a particular task.

The expression well done is extrapolated to specific actions. Examples include well fought, to soldiers on the winning side after a war; well bought, to someone with a new car or house; and even well put on, to a well-dressed person. (Note: Note previous discussion on the interchangeability of to dress, to wear and to put on.)

Ugandans often create portmanteaus from Luganda English words. For example, "I am going to change into a dress" becomes "I'm going to ku-changi-nga." In other cases, they add -ing at the end of a Luganda word; thus, a young girl can say "That gentleman was kwaana-ring me" to mean the gentleman was chatting me up. Or still letter "-d" or "-ed" can be added at the end of a Luganda word. For example, "Brenda kwanjula-d Brian at her parents' home" to mean "Brenda introduced Brian at her parents' home".

== Grammar differences ==
Ugandans will frequently combine two sentences into one using the word and. For example, a barber will say "Sit down and I cut your hair," or a messenger might say "They told me to come and you give me the package." The usage makes sense in most Ugandan languages, but in these languages the word and is implied, not stated.

The personal pronoun is usually added to imperative sentences. Thus, one hears the phrase "Go to Entebbe;" or "Please go to Entebbe" will become "You go to Entebbe." "Please come here" becomes "You come." "Let's go" becomes "we go".

=== Verbs ===
There is a tendency to create strong verbs from weak English verbs. For example, the past participle of the verb "to flop" is "flap" instead of "flopped". "I flap the test" means "I didn’t do well in the test". Other examples include rendering the past participle of "to game" as gam, "to fetch" as fatch and "to chop" as chap.

== Spelling ==
Standard English spelling rules are often openly disregarded, even in official publications. For example, the word dining is frequently spelt "dinning", which to a native English speaker would imply a pronunciation with a "short" i /ɪ/, as if it refers to making a loud noise (din) rather than referring to the room in which eating takes place (dine). Businesses that are labelled saloons are, in reality, western salons.

Another frequent change is the confusion of u /ʌ/ and a /æ/. An example would be the use of "batter" for "butter" (spread on bread).

== See also ==
- Commonwealth English
