= Talinga language =

Bantu language spoken in Central Africa

Talinga
- OluBwisi
- Native to: Uganda, Democratic Republic of the Congo
- Native speakers: (99,000 cited 2000–2002)
- Language family: Niger–Congo?: Atlantic–Congo; Volta-Congo; Benue–Congo; Bantoid; Southern Bantoid; Bantu; Northeast Bantu; Great Lakes Bantu; West Nyanza; Rutara; North Rutara; Talinga

Language codes
- ISO 639-3: tlj
- Glottolog: tali1258
- Guthrie code: JE.102
- ELP: Talinga-Bwisi

Talinga or Bwisi is a Bantu language spoken in the Uganda–Congo border region. It is called Talinga (Kitalinga) in DRC and Bwisi (Lubwisi, Olubwisi) in Uganda.

== Writing system ==
Bwisi alphabet (Uganda)
a	aa	b	bb	bh	c	d	dh	e	ee	f	g	gb	gh	h	i	ii	i̱	i̱i̱	j
k	kp	l	m	n	ny	o	oo	p	r	s	t	u	uu	u̱	u̱u̱	v	w	y	z
