= Robert Mugabe Kakyebezi =

Ugandan politician and mayor for Mbarara City

- Born: 1974 (age 51–52); Kebisoni Subcounty, Rukungiri District
- Other name: Etaara
- Occupations: Politician, Teacher and journalist
- Political party: National Resistance Movement
- Parent(s): Late George and Joy Kankunda

Robert Mugabe Kakyebezi alias Etaara is a Ugandan politician, teacher, and journalist. He is the mayor of Mbarara City, One of the largest cities in South Western Uganda.

== Background and education ==
At a tender age, his parents migrated to the current Kazo district in a village called Kantaganya, Kanoni subcounty, later joined Kantaganya primary school where he completed his primary seven.

He then joined Makobore High School in Rukungiri for secondary education but because of school fees problems, he dropped out in Senior Three and joined Nyakagyeme Secondary School which was affordable and its where he completed Uganda Certificate of Education. Thereafter he joined Rugarama Secondary School in Ntungamo District for Uganda Advanced Certificate of Education, and there after enrolled for a Diploma in Secondary Education at National Teachers’ College, Kabale, graduating in 1998.Meanwhile, when he started getting some good money, in 2012 he enrolled for Bachelor of Social Work and Social Administration studies at Bishop Stuart University in Mbarara, and graduated on 16 October 2015. He is a member of the Anglican Church of Uganda.

== Radio personality ==
In early 2002, Kakyebezi was given a job on Radio West in comic shows of Owatutanga aheru and Akagwe. He spent over fourteen years working on Radio West marking him one of longest serving Presenters at the Radio Station, before Politics.

== Politics ==
In 2015, Kakyebezi contested and won the Mbarara city mayoral sit in National Resistance Movement primary Elections. In 2019, NRM supporters urged him not contest in 2021 Elections.

Kakyebezi won the FDC candidate, Stanley katembeya in the general election in 2016.

== Controversies ==
In 2018, he was allegedly involved in a car accident which left two people injured and one dead. In June 2019, he was sued for allegedly issuing defamatory pictures.

In 2017, he was charged for accountability on over 300 million Katete wooden bridge funds. Early 2019, he was also grilled over unapproved Ushs1.7 billion spent on Street lights.

In March 2019, he was criticised for changing the Ankole symbolic cow Rusiina.
