= Runyakitara language =

Artificial standard language

Kitara
- Orunyakitara
- Created by: Uganda
- Date: early 1990s
- Users: Written language taught at university. 3 million speakers of the source languages (2002)
- Purpose: standard language
- Sources: Kiga, Nkore, Nyoro, & Tooro

Language codes
- ISO 639-3: qru (private use)
- Glottolog: None
- Guthrie code: JE.10A
- IETF: art-x-runyakit (private use)

Runyakitara is a standardized language based on four closely related languages of western Uganda:

- Nyoro or Runyoro
- Kiga (Chiga) or Rukiga
- Nkore or Runyankole
- Tooro or Rutooro

Jouni Filip Maho's 2009 New Updated Guthrie List Online calls it an artificial language, while Ethnologue calls it "standardized" and "hybrid".

The Google interface was translated into Kitara in February 2010 by the Faculty of Computing and IT, Makerere University. It is also used in the Orumuri newspaper, published by New Vision Group.

== See also ==
- Nyoro-Tooro
- Nkore-Kiga
- Rutara languages

== Relevant Literature ==
- Tumusiime, James. 2007. Entanda y'omugambi w'Orunyankore-Rukiga. Kampala, Uganda: Fountain Publishers. [a collection of proverbs, entire book is written in the language, with no English]
