= Radio West (Uganda) =

Radio station in Uganda

- Mbarara; Uganda
- Broadcast area: Uganda; Zimbabwe, Malawi, Kenya, Tanzania (via Azam TV)
- Frequency: 100.2 MHz

Programming
- Languages: English, Runyankore, Rukiga

Ownership
- Owner: Vision Group

History
- First air date: 10 April 1999

Technical information
- Licensing authority: Uganda Communications Commission
- Repeaters: 95.2 MHz (Kampala); 91.0 MHz (Fort Portal); 94.3 MHz (Kabale); 106.6 MHz (Masaka)

Links
- Website: www.radiowest.co.ug

Radio West is an FM radio station based in Western Region, Uganda. It is based in Mbarara with four additional repeaters. The station is owned by the Vision Group.

Radio West's audio stream is available on cable service Azam TV, further expanding Radio West's coverage to Zimbabwe, Malawi, Kenya, and Tanzania.

== History ==
Radio West began broadcasting on 10 April 1999 under the ownership of James R Tumusiime; it was acquired by the Vision Group in 2008. Radio West, along with TV West and the Orumuri News newspaper, moved into new custom-built offices in Mbarara in 2015.

In 2019, the station was tied for second in audience reach, with 4 percent of the audience. The station has been criticized for its pro-government editorial stance.

== Notable former presenters ==
- Robert Mugabe Kakyebezi, current mayor of Mbarara
