= USHS =

USHS may refer to:

- Central Luzon State University Science High School, Muñoz, Nueva Ecija, Philippines
- United South High School, Laredo, Texas, United States
- Upper Sandusky High School, Upper Sandusky, Ohio, US
- Utah State Historical Society
