= Nyoro =

Nyoro may refer to:

- Nyoro people, residing in the area of the former kingdom of Bunyoro
- Nyoro language
- A catch phrase used by Tsuruya in the Haruhi Suzumiya franchise
