= Radio West =

Radio West may refer to these radio stations:

- Radio West (Uganda), a radio station in Mbarara, Uganda
- Heart Bristol, launched in 1981 as Radio West
- Galway Bay FM, launched in the late 1980s as Radio West

RadioWest (written as a single word) may refer to the following

- RadioWest (KUER) an hour-long talk show from KUER-FM launched in 2001
- RadioWest a group of 11 AM radio stations in the southern half of western Australia
