= Zinza language =

Bantu language spoken in Tanzania

Zinza
- Ecizinza
- Native to: Tanzania
- Region: Lake Victoria
- Ethnicity: Zinza
- Native speakers: (140,000 cited 1987)
- Language family: Niger–Congo?: Atlantic–Congo; Volta-Congo; Benue–Congo; Bantoid; Southern Bantoid; Bantu; Northeast Bantu; Great Lakes Bantu; West Nyanza; Rutara; Zinza

Language codes
- ISO 639-3: zin
- Glottolog: zinz1238
- Guthrie code: JE.23

Zinza (Dzinda) is a Bantu language of Tanzania, spoken on the southern shore of Lake Victoria.
