= James R Tumusiime =

Ugandan author, journalist and entrepreneur (born 1950)

- Born: 1950 (age 75–76); Rugando, Rwampara, Uganda
- Education: Makerere University
- Occupations: Author; journalist; entrepreneur
- Years active: 1986–present
- Known for: Founding 100.2 Fm Radio West, New Vision and Fountain Publishers

James Rwehabura Tumusiime is a Ugandan author, journalist, and entrepreneur. He was born in 1950 in Rugando in Mbarara District. He is mostly known for spearheading the founding of The New Vision in 1986, Fountain Publishers in 1988, the National Book Trust of Uganda (NABOTU) in 1997, 100.2 Fm Radio West in 1998, and Igongo Cultural Centre in 2008. He was the author of what makes Africans Laugh. He has served on several international boards, including African Publishers Network (APNET), the o (AABC) and the International Board of Books for Young People (IBBY). He served as Chairman of Council of Mbarara University of Science and Technology and chairman of the Uganda Tourism Board.

== Education background ==
He attended Mbarara High School for his Uganda Certificate of Education and King's College Budo for Uganda Advanced Certificate of Education. He holds a BSc in agriculture and economics from Makerere University, an MBA from ESAMI and a Diploma in Publishing from the UK.

== See also ==
In 2016, he published an article in New Vision about elections: "we can't ignore success". He was also the author of a book titled Uganda's presidents - An illustrated Biography.

He also wrote UnGrateful Mothers. He also has a book titled A directory of Uganda's Sixth parliament 1986-2001.

He has written a book of proverbs in the Nyankole language, Entanda y'omugambi w'Orunyankore-Rukiga, published in 2007, by Fountain Publishers of Kampala, Uganda. It is accessible online on via Archive.org.
