= Ruhanga =

God in Bantu mythology

Ruhanga (lit. 'He Who Creates') features in Bantu spirituality as the remote creator and sky-God, recognized among the Rutara people (Banyoro, Banyankore, Batooro, Bahaya, Bakiga, Bahema and all other groups referred to in general as Banyakitara). The Bahima further recognise him as the arbiter of life, sickness, and death. However, unlike creator figures in other religious systems, Ruhanga is generally not a focus of worship.

According to Bahaya and Banyankore belief, humans originally came back to life on earth after dying, but Ruhanga took away this ability after a woman refused to properly celebrate the return of a human after the death of her pet dog.

== Etymology ==
The name Ruhanga means “Creator” in the Rutara languages. The name reflects Ruhanga’s role as the supreme creator of everything in the universe, including the other gods, spirits, humans, animals, and plants.

The word comes from the Proto-Bantu verb "Panga", which meant 'to create'. By regular processes of phonetic change the original Bantu word had become "Hanga" in the Rutara languages.

== Mythology ==
According to the mythology, Ruhanga is considered to be the founder of the Batembuzi dynasty of the Empire of Kitara. Ruhanga created the first three human beings from clay: Kairu, the farmer; Kakama, the king; and Kahima, the herdsman. He gave them different gifts and tasks, and assigned them different lands to live in. Kairu received a hoe and was sent to cultivate the land; Kakama received a spear and a shield and was made the ruler of the land; and Kahima received a stick and a rope and was given the task of keeping cattle. Ruhanga also created the first woman, Nyamata, and gave her to Kakama as his wife. Nyamata bore three sons, who became the ancestors of the Banyankore, Banyoro, and Batooro people.

Ruhanga also created the sun, the moon, and the stars, and placed them in the sky. He also created the seasons, the rain, and the thunder. He also created the other gods and spirits, who are his children or messengers. Some of the most important ones are Mukama, the god of the sky and the king of the gods; Nyamuhanga, the goddess of the earth and the mother of the gods; Kazooba, the god of the sun and the fire; Nyabingi, the goddess of fertility and war; and Ruhanga’s twin brother, Rugaba, the god of death and the underworld.

== Worship ==
Ruhanga is generally not a focus of worship among the Rutara people, as he is considered to be too distant and powerful to be approached by humans. Instead, the people worship his children or messengers, the other gods and spirits, who are more accessible and responsive to human needs and prayers. The people also worship their ancestors, who are believed to mediate between them and Ruhanga.

However, Ruhanga is still acknowledged and revered as the supreme creator and the source of all life. The people offer him thanks and praise for his creation and his blessings. They also seek his protection and guidance in times of trouble and danger. They also respect his will and his laws, which are revealed through his messengers, the diviners, and the elders.

== See also ==
- Karl Rahner
