= Baruuli =

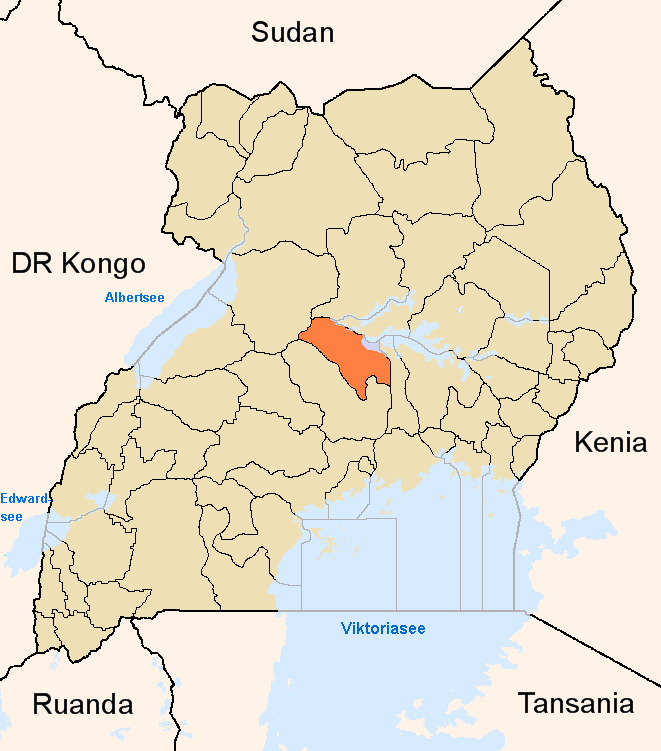

Total population
- 190,122

Regions with significant populations
- Uganda

Languages
- Ruuli language, English language

Religion
- Christianity, African Traditional Religion, Islam

Related ethnic groups
- other Rutara people (Banyoro, Batooro, Banyankore, Bahema and Bahaya)

Baruuli
- Person: Muruuli
- People: Baruuli
- Language: Ruruuli
- Country: Buruuli

The Baruuli or Baluuli (ethnonym: Baluuli; singular Muruuli), are a Bantu ethnic group native to Bunyoro-Kitara, a subnational kingdom within Uganda. They stay in an area called Buruuli. They share a common ancestry with the Banyala.

== History ==
The Baluuli came to be part of Buganda after their county was incorporated in Buganda, following Buganda's victory over Bunyoro in 1896, after it aided the British to spread colonialism. Their lands were distributed to Baganda families. They migrated to the North of Lake Kyoga to the county of the Langi. But they were forced to return to their lands in the 1980s. They lived in Luweero District, but a separate Nakasongola District was established in 1997 after the establishment of the Old Buluuli county which existed before 1990.

=== Origin ===
The Baruuli originated from present day Cameroon and settled in Kyope, which is part of present-day Kibanda, Maruzi and Oyam counties in Masindi and Apac districts. The Baruuli were originally known as Baduuli (or boasters). They used to boast of their wealth, which consisted of herds of cattle, sheep and goats. They boasted of having huge stocks of millet granaries and being a more hard-working community than the neighbouring tribes. By being in possession of such wealth they boasted that their region could never experience famine, or be short of wealth to pay dowry.

They lived in villages with the clans forming the nucleus. Each village was inhabited by a different clan. For example, Nakitoma village was inhabited by Bagonya clan, Kamunina village was inhabited by Baboopi clan, Busone village by Baigembe clan, Kikurubyo village by Bakurubyo clan, and Waiyala village by Ababwijwa. The original clans in Buluuli were Baranzi, Bagabu, Bainda, Basiita and Abacwezi. Other clans emerged later. Today there are over 130 Baruuli clans. Each clan had a respectable leader, usually a wise elderly man. Like it was all over Bunyoro-Kitara, clan leaders were believed to possess some supernatural powers. The societal hierarchy was that below the clan leader were adult males followed by women and children. A clan was distinguished by a common ancestry, a clan god, a clan spirit or omusambwa, a common totem which could be an animal, a bird or a plant and specific rituals and traditions.

While in Kyope, they were affected by slave trade which forced them to migrate. Some of them settled in Nakasongola, others in Bugerere. Those who settled in Bugerere became the Banyala. Some Baruuli went to the shores of Lake Albert and are now called the Bagungu. Those who went to Busoga are the Balamogi and the Basiki. There is another group that went as far as Tanzania.

The Baruuli worshipped Kankya, Katonda, Ruanga (God) through a number of deities such as Rubanga, Kyomya, and Nyabuzana. The mediums for these deities were usually males although in some clans female deities existed. Baruuli believed that deities were custodians of the welfare of their clans. There were deities for health, fertility, rain, wildlife, lakes and rivers. The deities were symbolised by terrestrial and celestial objects like the sun, mountains, hills, and lightning. The deities were African and black. But white deities surfaced during the Abacwezi.

There was also worshipping of spirits known as Misambwa. Each clan had its own musambwa, which they believed was responsible for the welfare and security of the clan Misambwa were believed to live on hills. Examples of the hills on which there lived misambwa are: Mbalye hill for Bandya clan, Waiyala hill for Babwijwa clan, Kagerikanyamusumba Hill for Bawuli clan and Kaisagara.

== Language ==
They speak a language known as Luruuli or Ruruli.

== Geography ==
The Baruuli are found in Central part of Uganda, west of Lake Kyoga, in Nakasongola District and Masindi District; some in Amolatar District and Luweero District. Transportation is difficult and people either walk or use bicycles for travelling, often for very long distances.

Today's two Buruuli counties are separated by River Kafu. One Buruuli in Masindi District of Bunyoro-Kitara Kingdom is north of River Kafu. While Buruuli, “the lost county”, is south. It is present day Nakasongola District. It stretched to Lukomera in the south. The boundary was River Kanganda.

Geographically, administratively and politically, Buruuli, consisted of the two Buruuli counties one in Masindi District and the other one in Buganda. It extended up to Lake Kyoga to the boundaries of the district of Apac. It included present day Kibanda county and Bugungu.

== Culture ==
The Baruuli people are herdsmen, farmers, fishermen and charcoal burners. They too carry out trade with the neighborhood in fish, charcoal and food. Their staple food is sweet potatoes and Matooke. They too grow millet, g-nuts, yams, cassava, and other kinds of vegetables. Their land is very dry almost all months but they do farming near the shores of Lake Kyoga.

The Baruuli culture has acquired cultural aspects of the surrounding Baganda and Banyoro. But they still maintain their language and cultural identity. Some distinguishing characteristics of Baruuli is their cultural leader - the Isaabaruuli, and their methods of naming around totems and giving names after circumstances. They have 120 clans but, unlike many other cultures, power is not hereditary.

=== Naming ===
The Baruuli named their children according to an event in a household, weather conditions and circumstances. If a family got a visitor who was a Muganda and a child was born during that visit, that child was named Muganda. If a family was prosperous and is now facing misfortunes, a child born now would be named Gawera to reflect the circumstances.

=== Marriage ===
Marriage among the Baruuli was of two types. The main marriage was called "Kuswera". The parents looked for the bride for their son. Once a son reached a marrying age, the parents went around asking whether there were girls of a marrying age. Once they confirmed that the girls were there, they informed the parents of the girls about their motives. The parents would then reach an agreement. If they agreed to the marriage, the girl's father would set a bride price. The boy's father would bring the items and then a day would be set for him to take the girl.

In the second type of marriage that was opted for by mostly those who were unable to pay bride price, the boys seduced the girls from their grand mothers dwellings from where girls were groomed. Once a girl gave in to the boy's advances and allowed to be married to him, the boy would leave four shillings in the girl's bed and then take her. If the grandmother failed to find the girl and then discovered the money, she would go to the girl's parents and inform them that the girl had been taken. The boy's father would then visit the girl's family and inform them that the girl was in his family. Bride price would be set and paid. failure to pay bride price would bring shame to the boy's family. The items of bride price included malwa (beer), goats and money.

=== Burial ===
During burial, the body would be rested in a deep pit, lying on the side, facing the power seat of Bunyoro, to show allegiance. No one was allowed to pour soil on a dead person's heart and forehead. If the head of a household died, a bull and a cock were slaughtered the following day for the mourners to eat. The widow did not bathe or shave their heads until an heir was instated. This period was long since people had to travel to attend the ceremony. The widow spent all of it without bathing. The orphans would walk with no clothes from the waist up, especially the girls.

== Religion ==
The Baruuli worshipped spirits and gods. They worshipped Nabuzana, Katigo, Irungu and kibubu, among others. They worshipped from shrines they called Birooro, and on hills.

Today Christianity has spread. The Roman Catholic and the Church of Uganda or Anglican Church are the two largest denominations among the Baruuli. According to the 2002 Census of Uganda around 14.8% of Baruuli are Roman Catholic, and 69.2% are Anglican. Additionally 4.5% of Baruuli are Pentecostal, and 3.5% are affiliated with the SDA Church (Seventh Day Adventist). 6.5% of the people are Muslim. Many still follow the traditional religions, and there is a high level of syncretism among those who go to church.

== Architecture ==
The Baruuli lived in grass-thatched houses. The thatch made the walls and the roof. They moved to mud walled houses with grass thatched roofed. Because of modernity, many of them now live in brick house that have tiled roof or those with iron sheets.

== Food ==
The Baruuli's staple food is akaita (millet paste) known as akalo in Luganda. Sweet potatoes and cassava are other main foods. The main source of protein is fish.
