= Nkole people =

Banyankole
- Flag of the Ankole Kingdom.

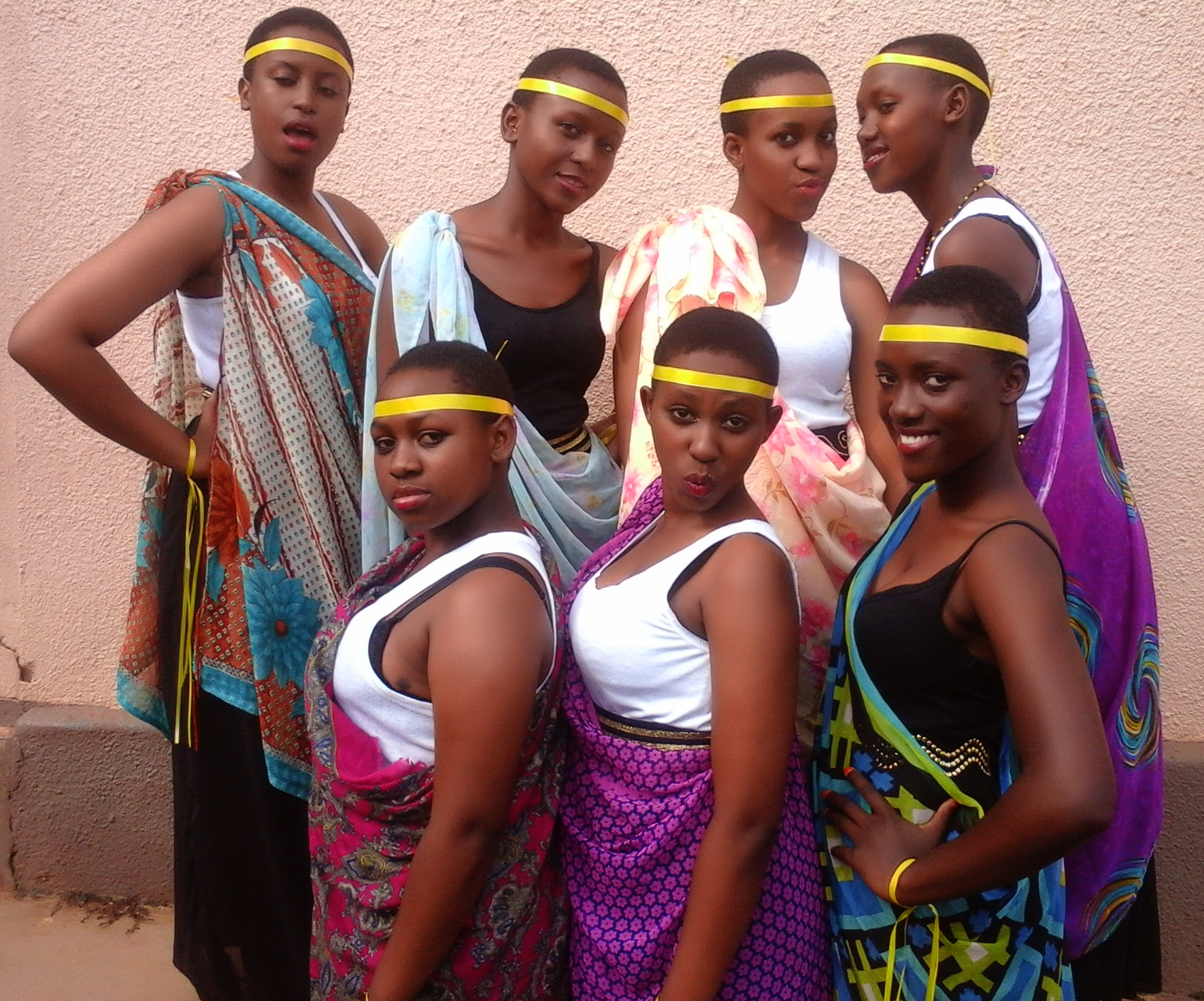

Total population
- 3,216,332

Regions with significant populations
- Uganda

Languages
- Runyankole • Swahili • English

Religion
- Predominantly; Christianity and Ankole Religion; Minority; Islam

Related ethnic groups
- other Rutara people (Bakiga, Batooro, Banyoro, Bahema, Bahaya and Baruuli)

- Person: OmunyaNkore
- People: AbanyaNkore
- Language: OrunyaNkore
- Country: Obugabe Bw'Ankole

The Nkole people, also known as the Banyankole, are a Bantu ethnic group native to the Ankole region of Uganda. They are primarily found in the southwestern part of the country, in what was historically known as the Ankole Kingdom. The Banyankole are known for their rich cultural heritage and traditional cattle-keeping practices. They are closely related to other Bantu peoples of the region, namely the Nyoro, Kiga, Toro and Hema people.

== Religion ==
The Banyankole tribe in Uganda is predominantly Christian, with a significant majority of its members practicing Christianity. The Banyankole people are primarily adherents of the Roman Catholic and Anglican (Church of Uganda) denominations. According to the 2002 Census of Uganda 52.6% of Banyankole are Anglican and 34.8% are Roman Catholic. A minority at 5.2% are Muslim and 4.6% Pentecostal.

== Names ==
There are several names they are referred to as. These include the following ones: Ankole, Ankori, Banyankole, Banyankore, Nkoles, Nkore, Nyankole, Nyankore, Ouanyankori, Runyankole, Runyankore, Uluyankole, Uluyankore.

== Other sources ==
- John Roscoe, The Banyankole: the second part of the report of the Mackie Ethnological Expedition to Central Africa, Cambridge University Press, Cambridge, 1923, 176 p.
