= Nyoro-Tooro language =

Language of western Uganda

Nyoro-Tooro
- Runyoro-Rutooro
- Orunyoro-Orutooro
- Native to: Uganda
- Region: Bunyoro, Tooro Kingdom
- Ethnicity: Banyoro, Batooro
- Native speakers: ~6,000,000 (first or second language) (2002/1991 census)
- Language family: Niger–Congo?: Atlantic–Congo; Volta-Congo; Benue–Congo; Bantoid; Southern Bantoid; Bantu; Northeast Bantu; Great Lakes Bantu; West Nyanza; Rutara; North Rutara; Nkore-Kiga-Nyoro-Tooro; Nyoro-Tooro
- Standard forms: Runyakitara
- Dialects: Nyoro; Tooro

Language codes
- ISO 639-3: Either: nyo – Nyoro ttj – Tooro
- Glottolog: nyor1247
- Guthrie code: JE.11–12

Nyoro-Tooro is a language spoken by the people living in the Bunyoro and Tooro sub-regions of western Uganda. It is often defined as two separate languages: Nyoro and Tooro, though it is defined and standardised as one language by the Ministry of Education in Uganda. It is closely related to Runyankore-Rukiga.

== Orthography ==
Nyoro-Tooro orthography
1947 (modern)	1901	IPA
a	a (Note: In the 1901 orthography, short and long vowels were not usually distinguished except for /iː/ ⟨ī⟩. If a lack of distinction causes severe ambiguity, short vowels would be marked with a breve and long vowels with a macron.)	/a/
aa	a	/aː/
b	b	/β/
bb	b	/b/
c	c	/tʃ/
d	d	/d/
e	e	/e/
ee	e	/eː/
f	f	/f/
g	g	/g/
h	h	/h/
i	i	/i/
ii	ī	/iː/
j	j	/dʒ/
k	k	/k/
l	l	/l/
m	m	/m/
n	n	/n/
ny (Note: In the modern orthography, /nj/ is written as ⟨ni⟩ in all contexts (e.g. okunia "to defecate"). The 1901 orthography did not distinguish between /nj/ and /ɲ/.) (Note: In the modern orthography, /ɲː/ (normally pronounced [ɲ], but still lengthens the vowel before it) is written as ⟨nny⟩ (e.g. okunnyaga "to kidnap me"). The 1901 orthography did not distinguish between /ɲː/ and /ɲ/.)	ny	/ɲ/
o	o	/o/
oo	o	/oː/
p	p	/p/
r	r	/ɾ/
rr	'r	/r/
s	s	/s/
t	t	/t/
u	u	/u/
uu	u	/uː/
v	—N/a	/v/
w	u, w (Note: Maddox states that "before vowels either u or w may be written, for no definite rule has yet been formed".)	/w/
y	y	/j/
z	z	/z/

== Comparison of Nyoro and Tooro ==
Nyoro and Tooro are very similar in many aspects, but differ in several ways as well.

=== Tone ===
Both languages are tonal languages where high and low tones (or H and L) are the essential tones. However, Nyoro has both lexical and grammatical tone, whereas Tooro only has grammatical tone. This means that some homophones in Tooro are differentiated in Nyoro.

Nyoro-Tooro word	Nyoro pronunciation	Tooro pronunciation	Proto-Bantu word	Part of speech	English (definition)
enda	/êːnda/	/éːnda/	*ndà	Noun	abdomen
enda	/éːndâ/	/éːnda/	*ndá	Noun	louse
ekyenda	/ekjênda/	/ekjénda/	*kɪ́á ndà (> *ekya enda)	Noun	intestine
ekyenda	/ekjéndâ/	/ekjénda/	*kɪ̀jèndá	Noun	(group of) ninety
engo	/êːŋgo/	/éːŋgo/	*ngò	Noun	leopard(s)
engo	/éːŋgô/	/éːŋgo/	*ngó	Noun	fences (Note: The singular for engo (meaning 'fences') is orugo.)

=== Word formation ===
There are many instances where the two languages have slightly different words. These minor variations include different consonants, vowels or vowel lengths.

Summary	Nyoro	Tooro	Part of speech	English (definition)
Consonants	enkwahwa	enkwaha	Noun	armpit(s)
Vowels	enkokora	enkokera	Noun	elbow
Formation	ngenzere	ngenzire	Verb	I have gone
Formation	nkozere	nkozire	Verb	I have done
Mixed	sso	iso	Noun	(your) father
