= Rutara languages =

Bantu language group

Rutara
- Runyakitara; Nyoroan
- Geographic distribution: Uganda, Tanzania, the DRC and Rwanda
- Ethnicity: Rutara people
- Linguistic classification: Niger–Congo?: Atlantic–Congo; Volta-Congo; Benue–Congo; Bantoid; Southern Bantoid; Bantu; Northeast Bantu; Great Lakes Bantu; West Nyanza; Rutara
- Proto-language: Proto-Rutara
- Subdivisions: North Rutara; South Rutara; Kerewe; Zinza

Language codes
- Glottolog: ruta1242

The Rutara or Runyakitara languages (endonym: Orutara, Orunyakitara) are a group of closely related Bantu languages spoken in the African Great Lakes region. They include languages such as Runyoro, Runyankore, Rukiga and Ruhaya. The language group takes its name from the Empire of Kitara.

== Classification ==
David L. Schoenbrun classifies the Rutara languages as follows:

- Rutara
  - North Rutara
    - Nkore-Kiga-Nyoro-Tooro
      - Nkore-Kiga (Runyankore-Rukiga)
        - Nkore (Runyankore)
        - Kiga (Rukiga)
      - Nyoro-Tooro (Runyoro-Rutooro)
        - Nyoro (Runyoro)
        - Tooro (Rutooro)
    - Ruuli (Ruruuli)
    - Talinga (Kitalinga)
    - Hema (Ruhema)
  - South Rutara
    - Haya (Luhaya)
    - Nyambo (Runyambo)
  - Kerewe
  - Zinza

=== Standardized language ===
- Runyakitara

== History ==
According to glottochronological calculations, Proto-Rutara emerged in the year 500AD in the Kagera region of Tanzania near Bukoba. In 1200AD it split into multiple groups which were north Rutara (which spread northwards into Uganda and the DRC), South Rutara, Zinza and Kerewe.
