= Nyoro language =

Language

Nyoro
- Orunyoro
- Native to: Uganda
- Region: Bunyoro
- Ethnicity: Banyoro
- Native speakers: 670,000 (2002 census)
- Language family: Niger–Congo?: Atlantic–Congo; Volta-Congo; Benue–Congo; Bantoid; Southern Bantoid; Bantu; Northeast Bantu; Great Lakes Bantu; West Nyanza; Rutara; North Rutara; Nkore-Kiga–Nyoro-Tooro; Nyoro
- Standard forms: Runyakitara
- Dialects: Runyoro proper; Rutagwenda
- Writing system: Latin

Language codes
- ISO 639-2: nyo
- ISO 639-3: nyo
- Glottolog: nyor1246
- Guthrie code: JE.11

- Person: OmuNyoro
- People: AbaNyoro
- Language: OruNyoro
- Country: BuNyoro

Nyoro or Runyoro (Orunyoro, [oɾuɲôɾo]) is a Bantu language spoken by the Nyoro people of Uganda. It has two dialects: Runyoro proper and Rutagwenda. A standardized orthography was established in 1947. It's most closely related to Rutooro.

== Samples ==
Nyoro	English translation
Kara na kara Kigambo akaba aroho, Kigambo akaba ali hamu na Ruhanga kandi Kigambo akaba ali Ruhanga. Okurugirra kimu ha kubanza akaba ali hamu na Ruhanga. Ebintu byona bikahangwa nibiraba omuli uwe, kandi uwe haatali busaho kintu kyona ekyahangirwe. Omuli uwe obwomeezi numwo bukaba buli, kandi obwomeezi obu nugwo gwali musana gw'abantu. Omusana ogu gujwera omu mwirima, kandi omwirima tigukaguraazaaga. Hakaba karoho omuntu ayatumirwe Ruhanga, ibara lye nuwe Yohaana. Ogu akaija kuba kaiso ow'okumanyisa eby'omusana, abantu boona nukwo baikirize habwe. Uwe akaba atali musana, baitu akaija kuba kaiso w'eby'omusana.	In the beginning was the Word, and the Word was with God, and the Word was God. The same was in the beginning with God. All things were made by him, and without him was not any thing made that was made. In him was life, and the life was the light of men. And the light shineth in darkness, and the darkness comprehended it not. There was a man sent from God, whose name was John. The same came for a witness, to bear witness of the Light, that all men through him might believe. He was not that Light, but was sent to bear witness of that Light.
Omulingo gwokutandika guli kuleker'aho kubaza okatandika kukora.	The way to get started is to quit talking and begin doing.
Bworaroraga by'oina mu bwomeezi, oijaga kuba n'ebikiraho. Bworaroraga by'otaina mu bwomezi, toliba n'ebikumara.	If you look at what you have in life, you'll always have more. If you look at what you don't have in life, you'll never have enough.
Buli atakakorahoga nsobi takagezahoga kintu kihyaka.	Anyone who has never made a mistake has never tried anything new.
Ebyomumaiso biri byabo abaikiriza mu burungi bw'ebirooto byabu.	The future belongs to those who believe in the beauty of their dreams.
Ngambira nyebwe. Nyegesa nyijuke. Ntekamu nyege.	Tell me and I forget. Teach me and I remember. Involve me and I learn.
Otagenda hali omuhanda gukutwara, genda mukiikaro ahatali muhanda olekeho akahanda.	Do not go where the path may lead, go instead where there is no path and leave a trail.
Okusingura tikiri buli kimu, baitu okwenda kusingura kiri.	Winning isn't everything, but wanting to win is.
Gezaho kuba muhangaizima mu bicu byomuntu.	Try to be a rainbow in someone's cloud.

== Language Contact ==
The Nyoro language acquired Central Sudanic loanwords from the Ma'di language in the 13-15th centuries during the Bachwezi era, when the early expanding Banyoro community absorbed Madi people whose previous territory extended south of the Nile into what is now northern Bunyoro. Runyoro burrowed various Madi words, such as the word for bellows, ostrich, sugarcane and donkey.

The Nyoro language later received Nilotic loanwords from the Luo languages after the migration of the Babiito and Palwo into Bunyoro.

== See also ==
- Runyakitara language
