= Postalveolar fricative =

A Postalveolar fricative is a fricative consonant produced with a postalveolar place of articulation. Postalveolar fricative may refer to:

- The voiced postalveolar fricative, IPA: ⟨ʒ⟩
- The voiced postalveolar non-sibilant fricative, IPA: ⟨ɹ̠˔⟩
- The voiced retroflex fricative, IPA: ⟨ʐ⟩
- The voiced alveolo-palatal fricative, IPA: ⟨ʑ⟩
- The voiceless postalveolar fricative, IPA: ⟨ʃ⟩
- The voiceless postalveolar non-sibilant fricative, IPA: ⟨ɹ̠̊˔⟩
- The voiceless retroflex fricative, IPA: ⟨ʂ⟩
- The voiceless alveolo-palatal fricative ⟨ɕ⟩
