= Nkore language =

Bantu language spoken by the Nkore and Hema peoples of Southwestern Uganda

Nkore
- Orunyankore
- Native to: Uganda
- Region: Ankole
- Ethnicity: Banyankore
- Native speakers: 3.4 million (2014 census)
- Language family: Niger–Congo?: Atlantic–Congo; Volta-Congo; Benue–Congo; Bantoid; Southern Bantoid; Bantu; Northeast Bantu; Great Lakes Bantu; Nyoro–Ganda (E10); West Nyanza; Rutara; North Rutara; Nkore-Kiga; Nkore
- Standard forms: Runyakitara
- Dialects: Hima; Hororo; Orutagwenda
- Writing system: Latin

Language codes
- ISO 639-2: nyn
- ISO 639-3: nyn
- Glottolog: nyan1307
- Guthrie code: JE.13
- Glottopedia: Runyankore

- Person: OmunyaNkore
- People: AbanyaNkore
- Language: OrunyaNkore
- Country: Obugabe Bw'Ankole

Nkore (also called Nkole, Nyankore, Nyankole, Orunyankore, Orunyankole, Runyankore and Runyankole) is a Bantu language spoken by the Nkore ("Banyankore") of south-western Uganda in the former province of Ankole, as well as in Tanzania, the DR Congo, Rwanda and Burundi.

Runyankole is mainly spoken in the Mbarara, Bushenyi, Ntungamo, Kiruhura, Ibanda, Isingiro, Rukungiri, Buhweju, Mitooma, Rwampara, Sheema, Rubirizi, and parts of Kitagwenda districts.

There is a brief description and teaching guide for this language, written by Charles V. Taylor in the 1950s, and an adequate dictionary in print. Whilst this language is spoken by almost all the Ugandans in the region, most also speak English, especially in the towns. (English is one of Uganda's two official languages, and the language taught in schools.)

Nkore is so similar to Kiga (84–94 percent lexical similarity) that some argue they are dialects of the same language, a language called Nkore-Kiga by Taylor. They use the same alphabet with minor orthographic differences (see Kiga).

== Phonology ==
Runyankore has a five-vowel system:

	Front	Central	Back
Close	i		u
Mid	e		o
Open		a	

- Sounds /i, u/ can be heard as [ɪ, ʊ] when short or lax.

Consonants
		Labial	Alveolar	Post- alveolar	Palatal	Velar	Glottal
Nasal		m	n		ɲ	ŋ	
Plosive/ Affricate	voiceless	p	t	t͡ʃ		k	
Plosive/ Affricate	voiced	b	d	d͡ʒ		g	
Fricative	voiceless	f	s	ʃ			h
Fricative	voiced	v	z	ʒ			
Trill			r				
Approximant					j	w	

== Basic greetings ==
The greeting Agandi, implying, "How are you?" but literally meaning "other news!", can be replied with Ni marungi, which literally means "good news!".

The proper greetings are Oraire ota? or Osiibire ota?, literally translated "How was your night?" and "How was your day?". "Good night" is Oraare gye and "Good day" is Osiibe gye.

Here are a few names one might use in a greeting:

- Madam – Nyabo
- Sir – Sebo
- Child – omwana
- Boy – omwojo
- Girl – omwishiki

== Food ==
- Matooke or Bananas - Ebitookye
- Maize Meal or corn bread – Obuhunga’Ensano’
- Beans – Ebihimba
- Meat – Enyama
- Millet Bread – Oburo
- potatoes _ Ebitakuri
- maize- ebicoori

== Body parts ==
- Head- omutwe
- neck-amaraka
- arm- omukono
- leg- okuguru
- ear- okutu
- eye- eriisho
- mouth- omunwa
- nose- enyindo
- teeth- amaino
- buttocks- ekibunu
- fingers- enkumu
- feet- ebigyere
- hand- engaro
- back- omugongo
- stomach- eibondo
- hair- eishokye
- nails- enono
- face- obuso
- lips- eminwa
- Tongue- orurimi
- Cheek- eitama
- Chin- ekireju
- Shoulder- eibega
- Jaw- omushaya
- Chest- ekifuba
- palm- ekiganja
- elbow- enkokora
- breast- eibeere
- brain- obwonko
- heart- omutima

== Other words and phrases ==
- No: Ngaaha (ing-gah-ha) or Apaana (ah-pah-nah)
- Yes: Yego (yegg-oh)
- Thank you: Webare (We-ba-re)
- Thank you very much: Webare munonga (We-ba-re mu-non-ga)
- You're welcome (literally: Thank you for appreciating): Webare kusiima (We-ba-re koo-see-mah)
- I like/love you: Ninkukunda (nin-koo-coon-dah) or ninkukunda munonga (nin-koo-coon-dah moo-non-gah)
- My name is ____: Eizina ryangye niinye ______ (ey-zeen-ah riya-gye ni-inye___) or ndi _____ (in-dee ______)
- I am from _____: Ninduga_____ (nin-doog-ah_____)
- It's how much shillings/money? Ni shiringi zingahi? (Knee shi-rin-gee zin-gah-hee) or ni sente zingahi?
- Good morning. How are you?

Oraire ota (orei-rota) Replies: I'm fine Ndaire gye (ndei-re-jeh) or Ndyaho (indi-aho)

- Good morning. Did you sleep well?

Oraire gye? (orei-reh-jeh) Reply: Yes, yourself? Yego, shan’iwe

- Good afternoon. How are you spending your day?

Osiibire ota (o-see-bee-rota) Replies: Nsiibire gye (insi-bi-reje)

- You are spending your day well?

Osiibire gye (Osi birejge) Replies: Yes- Yego (yegg-oh) or nsiibire gye

- Good afternoon. How has your day been?

Waasiiba ota (wasib-wota) Reply: Fine, good, I've spent it well – Naasiiba gye (nasi-baje)

- Good night: oraregye

== See also ==
- Runyakitara language
- Ebyevugo, Runyankore poetry form
