= Banyala =

Bantu ethnic group

Total population
- 47,699

Regions with significant populations
- Uganda

Languages
- Lunyala, English

Religion
- Christianity, African Traditional Religion

Related ethnic groups
- Other Bantu peoples

Banyala
- Person: Munyala
- People: Banyala
- Language: (O)Lunyala
- Country: Uganda

Banyala (ethnonym: Banyala; singular Munyala), are a Bantu ethnic group native to Buganda, a subnational kingdom within Uganda. They stay in an area called Bugerere in Kayunga District,. They share a common ancestry with the Baruuli.

== History ==
The history of Banyala is traced to the wars of Buganda against Bunyoro before 1900. They are a result of intermarriages between Banyoro and Baganda supported by the British Empire. Namuyonjo, Bunyoro's late King Kamurasi's son, rebelled against his father in the late 1800s and allied with the then Kabaka of Buganda, Mwanga II.

Mwanga welcomed him because Buganda was at loggerheads with Bunyoro. As a token of appreciation, Kabaka gave Namuyonjo control over the captured county of Bugerere, which was predominantly occupied by Banyoro. Namuyonjo did not occupy Kayunga at the time because the area was infested with dangerous flies known as "embwa". It was not until Buganda, helped by the British, flushed out the flies, that people started living in Kayunga. Namuyonjo proceeded to Budali, Bugembo, Kitwe and Bbale villages. At Misanga, he met Koojo, a self-imposed leader.

Since Koojo was not from the royal family, he was forced to surrender his leadership mantle to Namuyonjo without any resistance.

=== Origin ===
The Banyala were under Bunyoro. They had no kingship. They were organised under the clan system. Each hill was headed by the head of a clan. The clan heads chose amongst themselves someone who would lead them. The person they chose was called "omugabe". The "omugabe" is the one who represented the Banyala in Bunyolo.

The Banyala were initially called "Bagele". They were porters and builders. One day one of them was roofing Kablega's house, and to ensure that it did not leak, he urinated on top of it to see whether his urine would sip through. The king's guards saw him, arrested him and published him. The "Bagere" became the "Banyala", meaning those that urinate.

=== The types of the Banyala ===
The Banyala are for three types. The "Bagele", the "Bagambayi" and the "Batumbugulu". The "Bagele" are the Banyala who were under Bunyoro in Bugelele. The "Bagambayi" came to Bugelele with "Namuyonjo" when Bugelele became part of Buganda. The "Batumbugulu" are the Banyala that came to Bugelele long after Namuyonjo had overthrown "Mukongo".

=== Heads of Banyala ===
The Banyala had different heads before coming under Buganda. "Mabeyo" was the first, with his seat was in Kiyange. He was followed by "Zilimbela" whose seat was in "Kalunyu". This was succeeded by "Byalufu" whose seat was in "Wunga Kyambelwa". He was succeeded by "Mukongo" whose seat was in "Kirasa". It is "Mukongo" that "Namuyonjo" overthrew.

== Geography ==
The Banyala are found in Central part of Uganda, in Bugerere, Kayunga District.

== Culture ==
The Banyala are herdsmen, farmers, fishermen and charcoal burners. They too carry out trade with the neighbourhood in fish, charcoal and food. Their staple food is sweet potatoes and Matooke. They too grow millet, g-nuts, yams, cassava, and other kinds of vegetables. Their land is very dry almost all months but they do farming near the shores of lake Kyoga.

The Banyala culture has acquired cultural aspects of the surrounding Baganda and Banyoro. But they still maintain their language and cultural identity. The cultural head of the banyala is the "Ssabanyala". The Ssabanyala heads the clans of the Banyala, their customs and traditions. He is elected from amongst the 129 clan heads. He comes from the line of Kigonya.

=== Naming ===
The naming of children among the Banyala is based on proverbs, seasons and clans. A child from the "Mbopi" clan, the elephant clan can be named "Mubopi". A child born in a rainy season can be named "Kajura". Rain is "Njura" in Lunyala.

=== Beer ===
The main beer of Banyala is "Malwa". Beer was so important long ago if it was not one of the items bought with the bride price, the bride was not taken from the home.

=== Death and burial ===
When a Muinyala lost a family member, the bereaved built a hut around the grave. That is where they slept for a month. The dead were buried near their homesteads. There were no burial grounds for the clans. The dead would be buried in their homes.

When a Munyala lost his father, he did not eat salt for four days. After the four days, he would shower in a swamp at 6:00 am. Then his niece would give him salt to eat.

== Language ==
The Banyala speak a language known as "Lunyala". Most words begin with letter "O". For instance: "omwogyo", "Okwabayi", "Oliza".

== Religious beliefs ==
=== Today ===
The Roman Catholic and the Church of Uganda (or Anglican Church) are the two largest denominations among the Banyala. According to the 2002 Census of Uganda around 21.7% of Banyala are Roman Catholic and 53% are Anglican. In addition to being Roman Catholic and Anglican around 7.3% of Banyala are Pentecostal. Another 9.8% of the people are Muslim. Many still follow traditional religions, and there is a high level of syncretism among those who go to church.

=== Long ago ===
The Banyala worshipped spirits and gods. Every clan had its "Lubale". Katigo was the main "Lubale" of the Banyala. They also worshipped "Olubanga", "Onyanga" and many others. They built shrines where they worshipped from.

== Architecture ==
The Banyala lived in grass thatched houses. The thatch made the roof and the walls.

== Food ==
The main staple food of the banyala is sweet potatoes. They are called "Kasedde". The second one is Bigoli and Nsakwa. These are cut from swamps. They also eat Kalo, millet paste. The main source of protein is sim sim. The second one is fish.
