= Charles V. Taylor =

Australian linguist (1918–2009)

Charles V. Taylor (30 November 1918 – 2009) was an Australian linguist and the author of at least 19 books on topics ranging from African linguistics to ecclesiastical history. He was also known as a Bible teacher and a frequent Christian magazine contributor.

== Birth and early years ==
Charles Taylor was born in Uxbridge to Edith Taylor, née Hunt, on 30 November 1918, eight months after the death of his father Charles in the Great War. He lived in Uxbridge and attended the Bishopshalt School where he obtained a university scholarship, but did not take it up as his mother, a telephonist, wished him to earn a living. He joined the Air Ministry in a clerical position and meanwhile studied the Russian language at evening classes as well as attending piano classes at the Royal Academy of Music.

He joined the Royal Air Force (RAF) at the outbreak of the Second World War and in 1940 was sent as an English-Russian interpreter by convoy to Murmansk in the Soviet Union and from there to Kineshma on the Volga, where the British airmen taught the Russians to assemble and fly Hurricane planes. On return to Britain, he was chosen to learn Japanese and later posted to Indian with Allied Military Intelligence to translate documents retrieved from Japanese soldiers and other sources. At the end of the war he oversaw the surrender messages by the Japanese HQ at Singapore.

== Education ==
Charles Taylor obtained a BA from London University immediately after the War under a scheme for returned service personnel, and a teaching diploma. He later wrote a dictionary in Nkore-Kiga and after its publication was told that it could have been submitted as a doctoral thesis if it had not been published already. He then obtained a PhD from London University in the same East African language (see below). In the 1960s, he obtained an MA in applied linguistics from the University of Sussex.

== Family life and work ==
Charles met Else (later Elsa) Truderung while in India. She was a Polish national of German ethnicity working for a Christian mission in India. They were married in 1945 in India and returned to England in the same year. They had two sons, Paul, born in 1947 and (John) Malcolm, born in 1949. In 1952, Charles' mother died and he then travelled to Uganda to take up a position at Bishop Stuart College, an Anglican teacher training college in Ankole province. In 1961, he moved to Butere in Western Kenya to a teaching position at Chadwick Teachers' College, where he later became Principal. He returned to the UK in 1964, shortly after Kenya became independent of British rule. In 1969, he moved to Sydney to take a position at Sydney University heading up the Teaching of English as a Foreign Language (TEFL) programme at the English Department. He was instrumental in persuading the university to establish a chair of linguistics, which was initiated in 1976 and the foundation professor was Michael Halliday. Charles was a senior lecturer in that department when he retired from academic life.

== Notable positions ==
Taylor was a Fellow of the Institute of Linguists (FIL) and he served as coordinator of applied linguistics courses at the University of Sydney for eight years. He also served on the staff of Garden City School of Ministries, heading up the ministry school which included correspondence courses. He served as a member of the board of the Creation Science Foundation for some years. He survived his wife by six years and died at the age of ninety in 2009.

== Works and publications ==
Charles Taylor's published books include the original English - Nkore-Kiga dictionary. His thesis on the proper names in the Nkore-Kiga language was submitted to the University of London for a Ph.D. He contributed to linguistic journals and conducted linguistic research into the language of high-school textbooks while at Sydney University. He contributed columns to Christian periodicals over a period of time. After retirement he self-published several books on theological and related historical subjects.

== Selected bibliography ==
Charles V. Taylor (1984). The Oldest Science Book in the World. Assembly Press Pty. Ltd. ISBN 0 9590260 0 2.
