= Nkore-Kiga language =

Bantu language of Uganda

Nkore-Kiga
- Native to: Uganda
- Native speakers: 5.8 million (2014 census)
- Language family: Niger–Congo?: Atlantic–Congo; Volta–Congo; Benue–Congo; Bantoid; Southern Bantoid; Bantu; Northeast Bantu; Great Lakes Bantu; West Nyanza; Rutara; North Rutara; Nkore–Kiga–Nyoro–Tooro; Nkore-Kiga
- Early form: Proto-Nkore–Kiga
- Standard forms: Runyakitara
- Dialects: Nkore; Kiga

Language codes
- ISO 639-3: Either: nyn – Nkore cgg – Kiga
- Glottolog: nkor1241
- Guthrie code: JE.13–14

Nkore-Kiga is a language spoken by around 5,800,000 people living in the extreme southwest of Uganda. It is often defined as two separate languages: Nkore and Kiga. It is closely related to Runyoro-Rutooro.

== History ==
Archibald Tucker was the Linguistic Expert on Non-Arabic Languages for the government of Sudan and studied Bantu languages in Kenya and Uganda in the 1950s. In 1955, he determined that Nkore and Kiga were dialect variants of the same language, and it was not long after that the Ugandan government made this new classification official.

There potentially were some political reasons for this reclassification because it was at around the same time that the Ugandan government abolished the Nkore Kingdom. Merging the two languages may have been one way the government tried to ease the integration of the Nkore Kingdom into the rest of the country. By taking away their unique language the government gave them one less way to identify themselves as an independent entity.

== Resources ==
The main resource for Nkore-Kiga is a book written by Charles V. Taylor titled simply Nkore-Kiga.

== See also ==
- Runyakitara language
