= Central Luzon State University Science High School =

Public high school in Nueva Ecija, Philippines

University Science High School

Location
- Muñoz, Nueva Ecija, Philippines
- Coordinates: 15°43′57″N 120°55′51″E

Information
- Type: Science High School
- Established: 14 June 1976
- Principal: Dr. Lexter R. Natividad
- Grades: 7 to 12
- Newspaper: "The Researcher"
- Hymn: "CLSU Hymn"
- Website: www.ushs-clsu.edu.ph

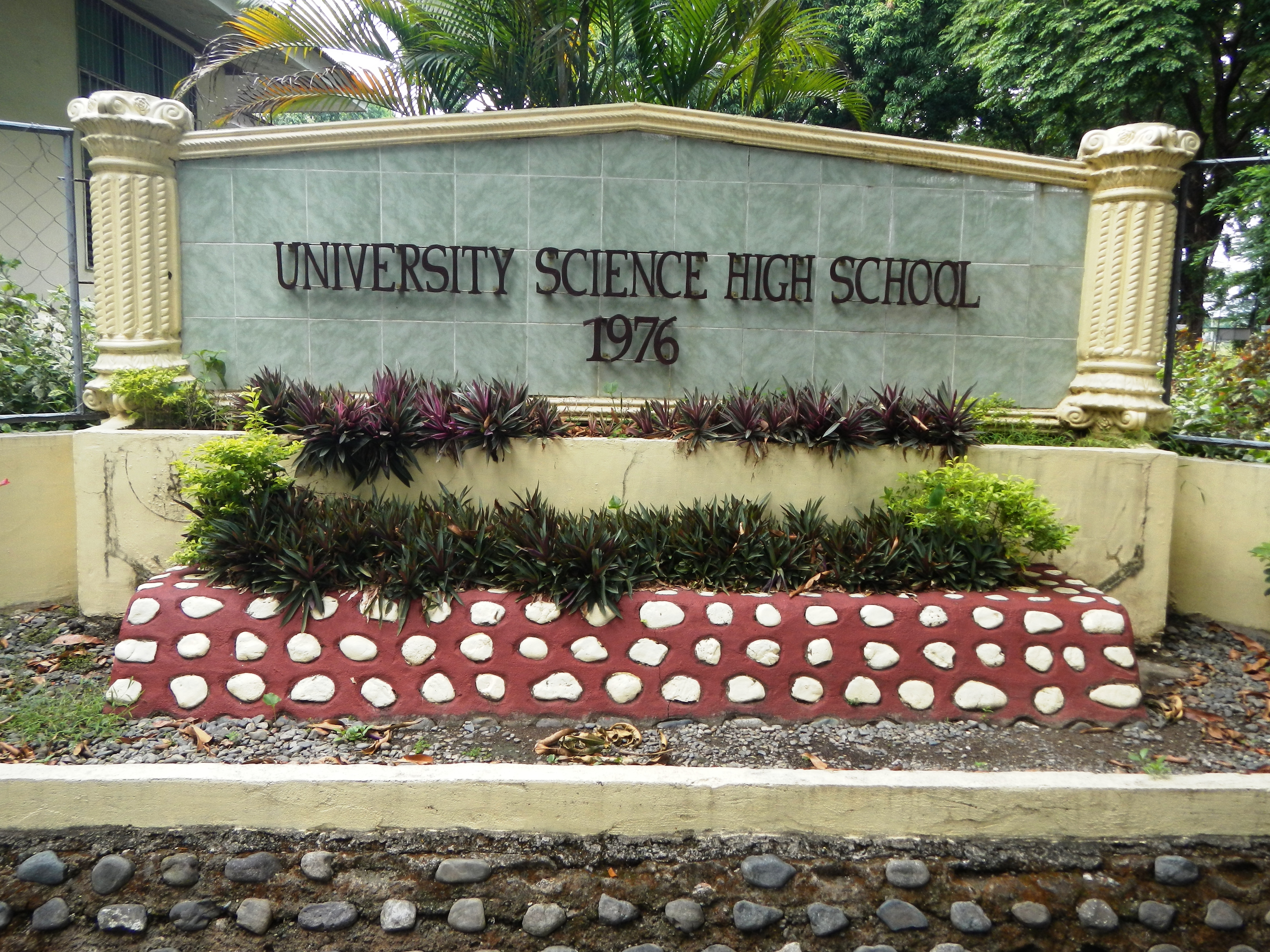
Facade

University Science High School, referred to as Central Luzon State University Science High School or USHS, is a science high school located inside the campus of Central Luzon State University (CLSU), in Muñoz, Nueva Ecija, Philippines. USHS is not included in the Philippine Science High School System and is under the College of Education of the Central Luzon State University.

== History ==
The University Science High School, established by virtue of the CLSU Board of Regents under the Board Resolution No. 1622 dated June 14, 1976 as a prime school for students who want to pursue science and technology courses which the country needs for its massive and sustaining development programs. In 1978, Board Resolution No. 1780 was passed revising the curriculum and changing the name to Agricultural Science High School as an answer to the clamor for change of the traditional curricular offerings.

Further revision/enrichment of the curriculum was made in 1979 to strengthen the agricultural components and meet the needs of the students who seek admission to Agricultural Institutions of higher learning without prejudice to the original goal of preparing the youth for intensive training in science and technology. The school has opened its doors to interested applicants who qualify through screening by an entrance examination to fill up the limited slot of 80 in the first year level since 1978.

In 1983, the school was back to its original name, the Science High School, to respond to the schools' intensive emphasis in science and technology.

Now in its more than 2 decades of existence, though a small unit in the University under the College of Education, the USHS has been an asset continuously giving its share in making CLSU a bold name in the academic world where science and technology front the line in its educational thrusts by producing quality graduates.

== Admission ==
As a prerequisite for admission, prospective students must pass a comprehensive entrance exam. The top 60 qualifiers among an annual average of 400 applicants are selected. An additional ten slots are reserved for admission of the faculty/staff's children.

== Curriculum ==
The curriculum includes courses that cover the basic concepts of biology, chemistry, physics, mathematics, computer science, English, Filipino, social studies, and the arts.

In addition to the core courses, students in the USHS also have the opportunity to take a variety of elective courses that allow them to explore their interests and develop their skills. These elective courses may include environmental science, robotics, and agricultural science.

The school also offers a number of extracurricular activities that allow students to explore their interests, develop their skills, and work with others. These extracurricular activities may include the SBO-SSG (Student Body Organization and Supreme Student Government), The Researcher (Journalism) and many more.
