= West Nyanza languages =

West Nyanza
- Nyoro-Ganda
- Geographic distribution: Uganda, Tanzania, the DRC and Rwanda
- Linguistic classification: Niger–Congo?: Atlantic–Congo; Volta-Congo; Benue–Congo; Bantoid; Southern Bantoid; Bantu; Northeast Bantu; Great Lakes Bantu; West Nyanza
- Proto-language: Proto-West Nyanza
- Subdivisions: North Nyanza; Rutara

Language codes
- Glottolog: west2841

The West Nyanza languages are a subgroup of the Great Lakes Bantu languages spoken in Uganda, Tanzania and the DRC.

== History ==
People first spoke proto-West Nyanza in the year 100AD in the Kagera Region, and their descendants eventually formed two speech communities, one speaking Proto-Rutara and the other Proto-North Nyanza. North Nyanza began to be spoken as a language on the northwestern shore of Lake Victoria in the sixth century CE while Proto-Rutara was developed by the people who stayed behind in the Kagera Region. Many of the northern Rutara peoples (whose descendants founded Kitara) migrating northwestwards into the drier and more open woody savanna grasslands of western Uganda developed a political economy based mostly on intensive Cattle keeping and cereal growing (especially of finger millet) while the North Nyanza peoples (whose descendants founded Buganda and Busoga) created a land-intensive political economy around their banana and plantain groves and fishing near the very well-watered shores of Lake Victoria. Some Rutarans who stayed behind in Kagera near Lake Victoria like the Haya also built their food system around the banana garden.
