= List of tribes in Uganda =

Uganda has many tribes that speak different languages.

The following is a list of all constitutionally-recognized Ugandan tribes in alphabetical order, as well as some tribes that are currently unrecognized. This list refers to Article 10(a) and the Third Schedule of Uganda´s Constitution (Uganda's indigenous communities as of 1 February 1926). Originally 56 tribes were listed, but the 2005 version of the constitution enumerates 65 indigenous communities.

== A ==
- Acholi
- Aliba
- Alur
- Aringa

== B-D ==
- Baamba
- Babukusu
- Babwisi
- Bafumbira
- Baganda
- Bagisu
- Bagungu
- Bagwe (part of Samia-Bugwe)
- Bagwere
- Bahehe
- Bahororo
- Bakenyi
- Bakiga
- Bakonzo
- Banyabindi
- Banyabutumbi
- Banyankore
- Banyara
- Banyaruguru
- Banyarwanda
- Banyole
- Banyoro
- Baruli
- Barundi
- Basamia
- Basimba people
- Basoga
- Basongora
- Batagwenda
- Batoro
- Batuku
- Batwa
- Chope
- Dodoth

== E-I ==
- Ethur (Acholi-Labwor)
- Gimara
- Ik (Teuso)
- Iteso

== J-K ==
- Jie
- Jonam
- Jopadhola
- Kakwa
- Karimojong
- Kebu (Okebu)
- Kuku
- Kumam

== L-N ==
- Langi
- Lendu
- Lugbara
- Madi
- Mening
- Mvuba
- Napore
- Ngikutio
- Nubi
- Nyangia

== O-Z ==
- Pokot
- Reli
- Sabiny
- Shana
- So (Tepeth)
- Vonoma

== Unrecognized tribes ==
There are additional tribes within Uganda that are not constitutionally recognized but may be listed in the census or other governmental categories. These include:

- Maragoli
- Saboat (Sebei)
