= Samia-Bugwe Kingdom =

Traditional kingdom in Uganda

Kingdom of Bugwe Obwen'engo Bwa Bugwe (Lugwe)
- Flag Coat of arms

- Location of the Samia-Bugwe Kingdom (Red) in Uganda (White)
- Status: Traditional kingdom
- Capital: Busia
- Official languages: Lugwe, Lusamia, English
- Ethnic groups: Bagwe; Basamia
- Demonyms: Mugwe (singular); Abagwe (plural); Musamia (singular); Abasamia (plural)
- Government: Constitutional monarchy
  - Monarch: Nahaama III
  - Prime Minister: Arafat Barasa Egessa
- Legislature: Council of Elders

Establishment
  - Established: 2017

Area
  - Total: 729 km^{2} (281 sq mi)

Population
  - 2024 census: 412,671
  - Density: 566.1/km^{2} (1,466.2/sq mi)
- Currency: Ugandan shilling
- Time zone: UTC+3
- Calling code: 256

The Kingdom of Bugwe, commonly known as Samia-Bugwe, is one of the 17 officially recognised traditional kingdoms in Uganda. Located in south-eastern Uganda, on the border with Kenya, its territory covers the Busia District. The kingdom is the home of the Bagwe and Samia people, two closely related ethnic groups. Of Uganda's total population, the Bagwe constitue roughly 0.2% while the Samia make up roughly 1.2%, combining to total 1.4%. The kingdom is ruled by the Omwenengo, who is the supreme cultural leader of the Bagwe and Samia people.

Officially recognised and sanctioned by the Ugandan government since 2019, the kingdom is defined as a traditional cultural institution without political power under Ugandan law. The task of the institution is to promote tradition, popular participation and unity among the people of the region. The kingdom government, through grants from the Ugandan government and private donations, operates development programs and institutions to improve the standard of living for the Bagwe and Samia people.

== History ==
A Bugwe kingdom existed in the pre-colonial period, and was integrated into the Uganda Protectorate by the British in the 1890s, alongside the rest of eastern Uganda. The kingdom was eventually abolished, with Yusuf Obara as the last reigning Omwenengo of the first kingdom.

In 2011, the 174 Bagwe clans agreed to restore the kingdom and selected Philip Wanyama, a grandson of Yusuf Obara, to take the throne. Due to disagreements and disputes over the throne, the kingdom was not formally declared restored before in 2017, with Philip Wanyama proclaimed Omwenengo Nahaama II. The restoration was formally recognised by the Ugandan government in 2019, and Nahaama II was crowned in 2020.

Nahaama II died on 2 March 2023, following a two-year battle with cancer. He was succeeded by his son, Nahaama III, who became the ninth Omwenengo.

== Government ==
Samia-Bugwe is a constitutional monarchy with a codified constitution. The Omwenengo is the sovereign and supreme chief of the Bagwe and Samia people and head of the kingdom. The throne is hereditary, with the reigning Omwenengo designating one of their children to be their successor.

The Omwenengo appoints a Prime Minister and government to exercise day-to-day governance.

The Council of Elders is the kingdom's legislature, and consists of the elders of the 174 Bagwe clans.
