= Bakenyi =

A fishing and Water Loving Minority Tribe The Bakenyi

Bakenyi tribe are a Bantu speaking ethnic group of people in Uganda. They are believed to have migrated from Buganda central region eastwards to settle in the eastern parts of Uganda around Lake Kyoga basin in the Buyende district. The Bakenyi tribe speak the language called "Lukenyi".

== Population ==
The population of the Bakenyi tribe with reference to the 2002 census conducted by Uganda National Bureau of Statistics showed the Bakenyi people were 62,009 despite recent statistics indicate 99,880 people contrary to Bakenyi rights groups research data findings that indicate 1.2 million people in the Bakenyi community.

== Controversy ==
Bakenyi tribe migrated during the 18th century and changed into a new and distinct tribe after they migrated out of Buganda in the 18th century following the civil war between princes Junju and Semakokiro. They settled around Lake Kyoga basin in the areas of Teso, Lango and Bukedi. The cultural leadership petitioned Uganda National Bureau of Statistics for misrepresenting their number in the census data which stands at over 1.2 million people that deprives them of the national budget from the Ugandan government.

== See also ==
- Baganda People
- Gisu People
- Ugandan Folklore
- Ugandan Traditions
- Samia Tribe
