= Omwenengo of Bugwe =

Title of the king of Samia-Bugwe, Uganda

- Coat of Arms of Samia-Bugwe

Incumbent
- Nahaama III since 2 March 2023

Details
- Style: His Royal Highness

The Omwenengo of Bugwe (Also spelled Omwen'engo) is the ruler of the Samia-Bugwe Kingdom in south-eastern Uganda, along the border with Kenya. As hereditary ruler, the Omwenengo serves as the unifying cultural and traditional leader of the Bagwe and Samia people.

== History ==
The Bagwe monarchy traces its roots back to the pre-colonial period. The kingdom was incorporated into the Protectorate of Uganda by the British in the 1890s. During this period the final Omwenengo of the first kingdom, Yusuf Obara, was dethroned.

The decision to restore the Bagwe monarchy and the throne of the Omwenengo was taken in 2011, when elders from the 174 Bagwe clans designated Philip Wanyama, a grandson of Yusuf Obara, to be the new Omwenengo. Wanyama was not officially proclaimed Omwenengo before in 2017, owing to disputes over the succession, whereupon he took the regnal name Nahaama II. Upon his death, he was succeeded by his son Nahaama III.

== Succession ==
Samia-Bugwe is a hereditary monarchy, with the throne vested in the Balundu dynasty. The reigning Omwenengo is required to designate one of their children as heir, and upon their death the heir is to be installed on the throne before the burial of their predecessor.

== Political power ==
As head of state of Samia-Bugwe, the Omwenengo exercises significant powers over the government of the kingdom. The Omwenengo appoints the Bagwe Prime Minister and the members of the cabinet. Ugandan law however prohibits traditional monarchs from exercising political powers or being involved in politics. As such, the Omwenengo's powers are limited to only cover the kingdom's remits regarding cultural and development matters.
