= Shana people =

Bulambuli District

The Shana people are a minority tribe in Eastern Uganda living in present-day Bulambuli District. They are believed to have migrated from western Uganda. The Constitution (amendment) Act 2005 added Shana as indigenous communities of Uganda.

== Controversy ==
The Shana people as an indigenous community have always been in conflict with neighbouring tribes like the Bugisu in Sironko, and Bulambuli districts. The clashes between the two tribes have led to loss of property, destroyed crops and banana plantations within the two communities. Legal authorities have continuously intervened to settle disputes among these tribes which to a larger extent has reduced violence within the two communities.

== See also ==
- Acholi People
- Bagisu People
- Samia Tribe
- Ugandan Folklore
- Ugandan Traditions
