= Banyabutumbi =

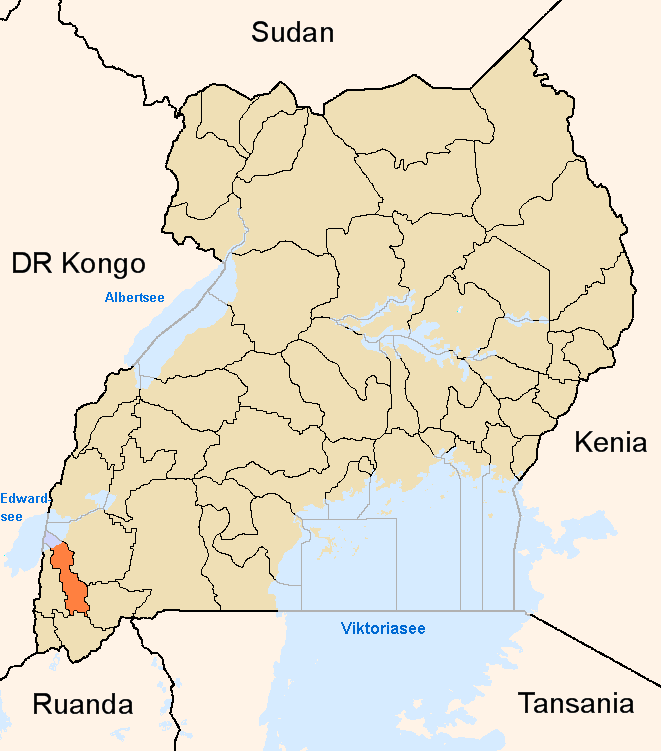
Rukungiri District (highlighted), Uganda

The Banyabutumbi people are an indigenous group of people living in Uganda. They are found in the areas of Bwambara sub-county, in Rukungiri District in the areas of Queen Elizabeth National Park. Banyabutumbi people also practiced hunting as a key activity in earning a living.

The Banyabutumbi people practice agriculture and fishing. Rukungiri is mostly inhabited by the Bakiga, Bahororo, Banyabutumbi and other small sub-tribes.

There is a large community of Banyabutumbi in the fishing village of Rwenshama, which is adjacent to Lake Edward. The organization Banyabutumbi Cultural Heritage Organization-Kanungu (BACHO-K), in partnership with the USA nonprofit organization Sahaya International, and the European organization Sahaya-Sawes, runs a lot of programs to preserve the culture (including through music and dance), help the local community, including orphan support, school programs, and income-generating activities. BACHO-K's youth dance and music group, the Lake Edward Cultural Performers, regularly performs, including at high functions, and wins many competitions in Uganda.

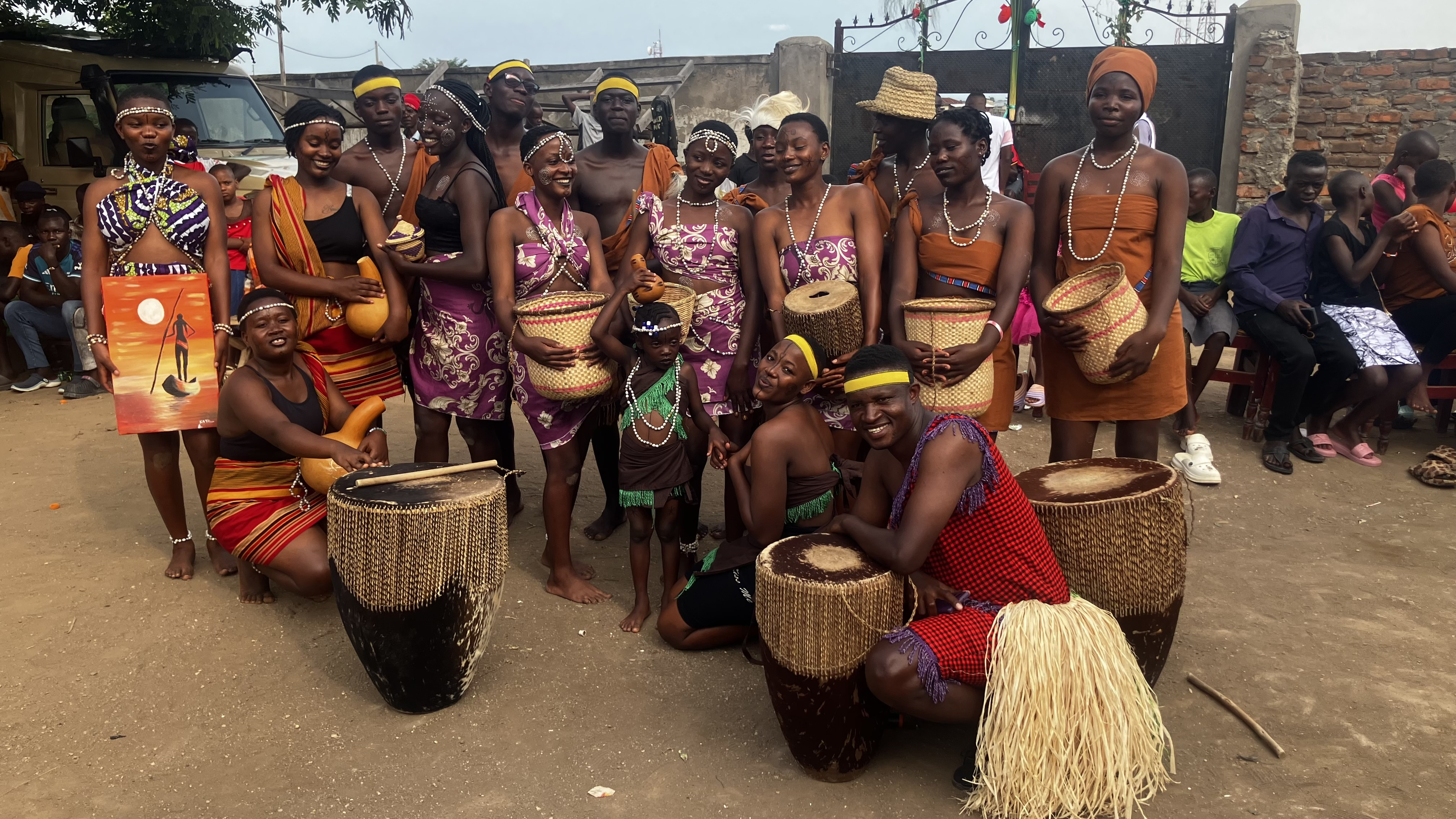
Banyabutumbi cultural performers (organized by BACHO-K)

== See also ==
- Buganda
- Ugandan Folklore
- Gisu People
- Sebei
- Ugandan traditions
