= Babwisi people =

Tribe in South-Western Uganda and Eastern DR Congo

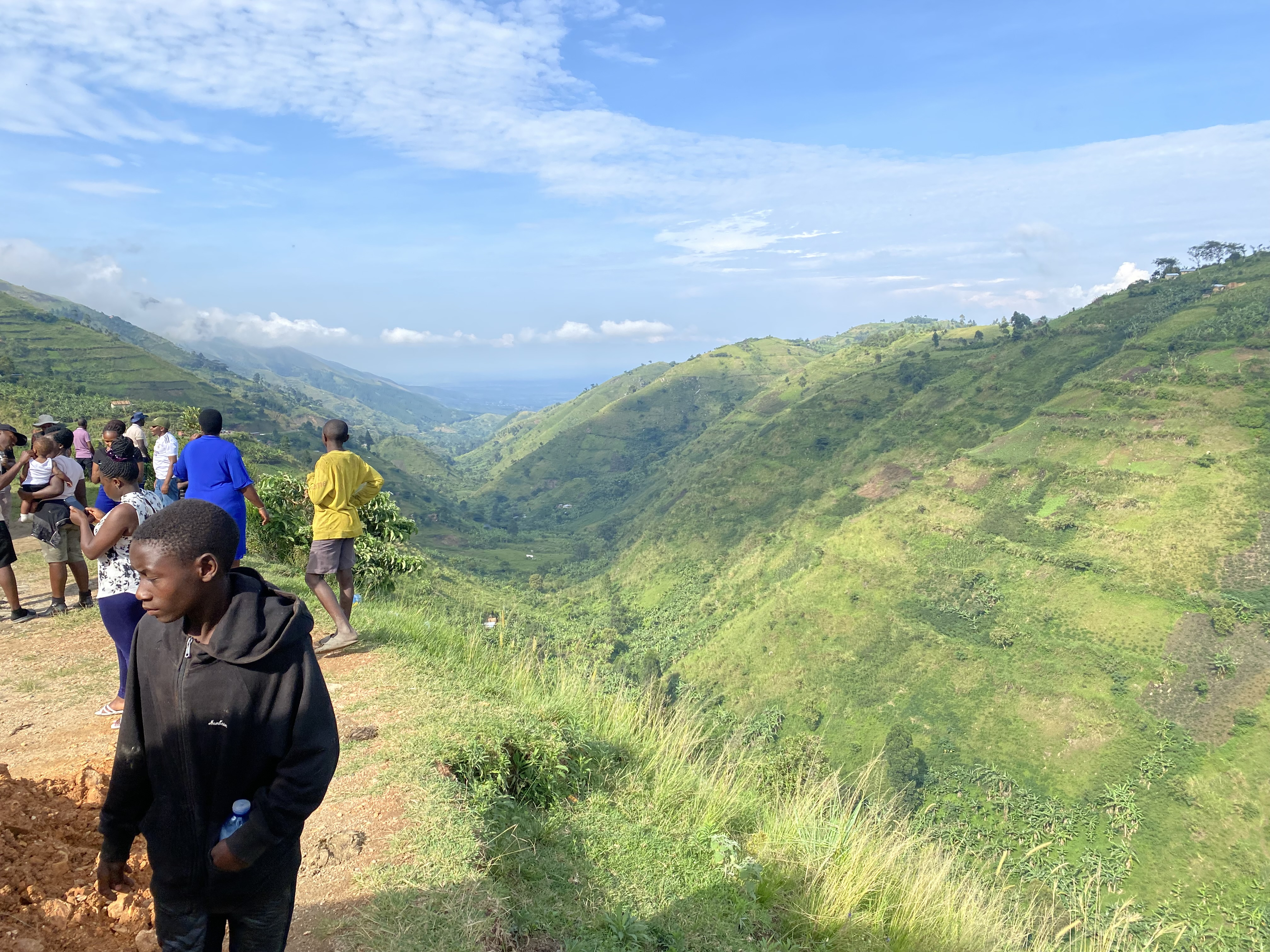

Regions with significant populations
- Uganda, Democratic Republic of the Congo

Languages
- Lubwisi , English

Religion
- Traditional African religion Christianity

Related ethnic groups
- Nyoro, Haya, Toro, Hema, Hunde, Nkore

The Babwisi people are a Bantu-speaking tribe found in South-Western Uganda and the eastern part of the Democratic Republic of the Congo. In Uganda, they primarily inhabit the Bundibugyo district around the Semiliki River and surrounding areas. They speak the Lubwisi language and are known for their traditional practices and close-knit community structures.

== Culture ==
The Babwisi practice traditional dances using local drums called Amakondere during festivities. They practice agriculture, cultivating crops such as millet and cassava, and engage in animal rearing for subsistence.

== History ==
The Babwisi have historically lived along the slopes of Mount Rwenzori near the border of Uganda and the Democratic Republic of the Congo. They originally settled in the Semiliki and Lamia River areas but were evicted in 1920 by the colonial government following an outbreak of sleeping sickness.

== Related groups ==
The Babwisi people are culturally and linguistically related to other Bantu-speaking groups in the region, including the Nyoro, Haya, Toro, Hema, Hunde, and Nkore.

== Image ==
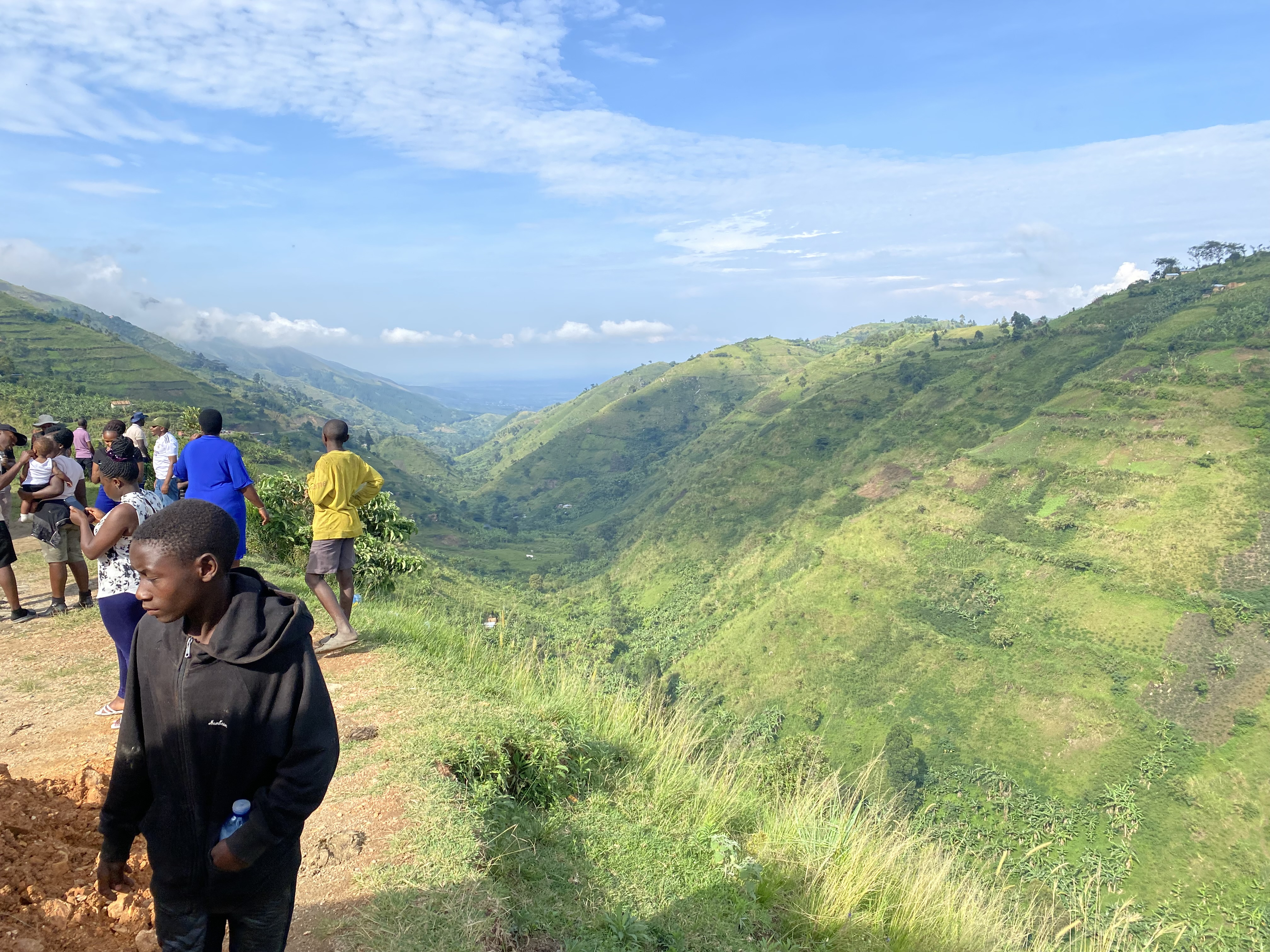
View of the Bundibugyo district, home to the Babwisi people

== See also ==
- Acholi People
- Vonoma
- Lango People
- Gisu
- Ugandan Folklore
