= Bahehe =

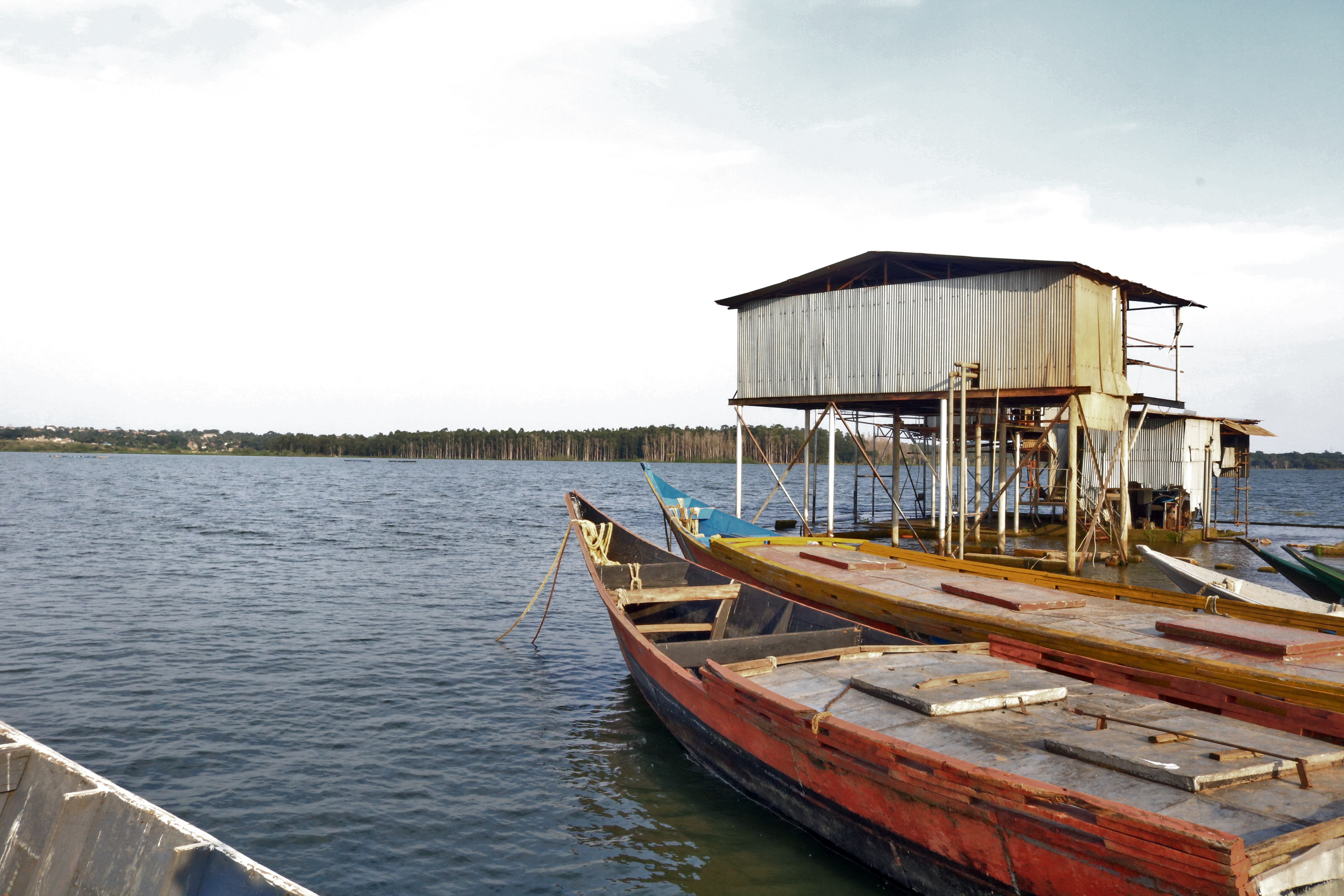
Lake Victoria Shores

The Bahehe are an indigenous tribe that can be found in southeast Uganda, on Lake Victoria's northeastern shores, and on Uganda's border with Kenya. The Bahehe belong to the Bantu ethnic group that originated from Tanzania where they were part of the Hehe people who live in south-central Tanzania. According to the Uganda Bureau of Statistics (UBOS) census of 2014, the Bahehe community numbered 4,023.

== See also ==
- Buganda People
- Gisu People
- Ugandan Folklore
- Ugandan Traditions
