= Reli tribe =

Reli Tribe is a minority ethnic group living in Itula sub-county, Obongi District, West Nile-Uganda. This indigenous community was recognized on 1 February 1926 and published in the Constitution of the Republic of Uganda.

== See also ==
- Buganda
- Gisu People
- Ugandan Folklore
- Ugandan Traditions
