= Council of Elders (Samia-Bugwe) =

Legislative body of the Samia-Bugwe Kingdom

- Coat of arms of Samia-Bugwe

Type
- Type: Unicameral

Leadership
- Speaker: Philemon Buluma

Structure
- Seats: 175
- Political groups: Territorial representatives (175): Elders (175)

Meeting place
- Busia, Uganda

The Council of Elders is the legislative branch of the Samia-Bugwe Kingdom in south-eastern Uganda. It is the primary policy-making body of the Bugwe Kingdom, charged with legislating by-laws of the kingdom and scrutinising the kingdom's government, but is not allowed by the national government to legislate on political matters.

The council consists of the elders of the 175 Bagwe clans.
