= Ethur =

Jo' Abwor
- Location of Abim District on Uganda Map

Total population
- 98,348 (2014, census)

Regions with significant populations
- Uganda
- Uganda: 98,348

Languages
- Leb Thur

Related ethnic groups
- Luo people, Nilotic peoples
- The Ethur people are known for their skills in pottery, blacksmithing, and traditional farming practices.

Ethur tribe is one of Uganda's minority communities living in Abim District, located in northeastern Uganda. The Ethur people are herdsmen and practice goat rearing, cattle keeping and agriculture for their livelihood. They are subsistence farmers who sell or exchange products with neighboring tribes. Additionally, the Ethur people are potters and blacksmiths who make various products for sale to neighbouring tribes.

== Language ==
The Ethur people speak the language "Leb Thur" but are also multilingual people. They are also referred to as Jo' Abwor since they settled on Labwor hills.

== Location ==
The Ethur people are found in Abim District at Latitude 2.7067° N, and Longitude 33.6595° E.

== Population ==
The Ethur people in 2014 according to Uganda National Bureau of Statistics had a population of 98,348 people living in Abim District.

== Origin ==
The Luo migrated from Bar-el Gazel in South Sudan as a broader Nilotic ethnic group that had within it several sub-groups of tribes that settled in different areas during the migration period. The Ethur belong to the Nilotic ethnic group under the Luo subgroup who migrated southwards to Northern Uganda around 15th century Luo migration. During the migration, Ethur people arrived in Northern Uganda and settled at Labwor hills in present-day Abim district where majority of them live.

== Controversy ==
Cattle raids are rampant in the Ethur community often carried out by the Karamojong cattle rustlers. They believe all cattle in neighboring communities belong to them leading to serious cattle raids and gun violence that lead to loss of lives. The Karamojong tribe see Ethur tribe as foreigners encroaching on the Karamojong land despite all being Luo groups who migrated together and settled in different areas. Ethur tribe is not accepted by the Langi, Acholi, Teso and the Karamojong since they speak their own language "Leb Thur" and as a result they are constantly under threat from neighboring tribes especially the Karamojong cattle rustlers.

== See also ==
- Alur
- Lugbara
- Ugandan Traditions
- Ugandan Folklore
