= Hororo =

Hororo may refer to:

- Hororo (Bantu), a Bantu tribe living in northern Uganda
- Hororo (Florida), or Jororo, an extinct Native American tribe who once lived in what is now the U.S. state of Florida
