= Gimara =

- Populated place
- Country: Uganda
- Region: Northern Region
- District: Obongi District
- Municipality: Itula
- Elevation: 637 m (2,090 ft)

Population (2024)
  - Total: 14,367
- Time zone: UTC+3 (EAT)

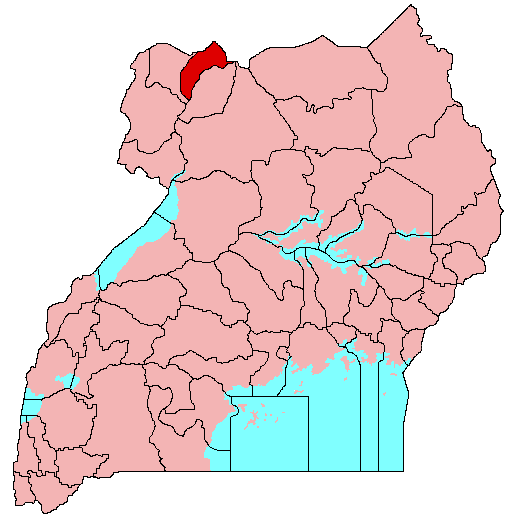
Map of Uganda Showing Moyo District

The Gimara tribe are a group of people living in Northern Uganda in Moyo District. Gimara is a sub-county in Uganda with 2 parishes and 17 villages. Considered as a minority tribe in Uganda, the government added Gimara tribe to be recognized in Uganda's constitution of 1995 as independent tribes.

== See also ==
- Alur
- Aringa
- Ugandan Folklore
- Ugandan traditions
