= Vonoma =

Tribe in Uganda

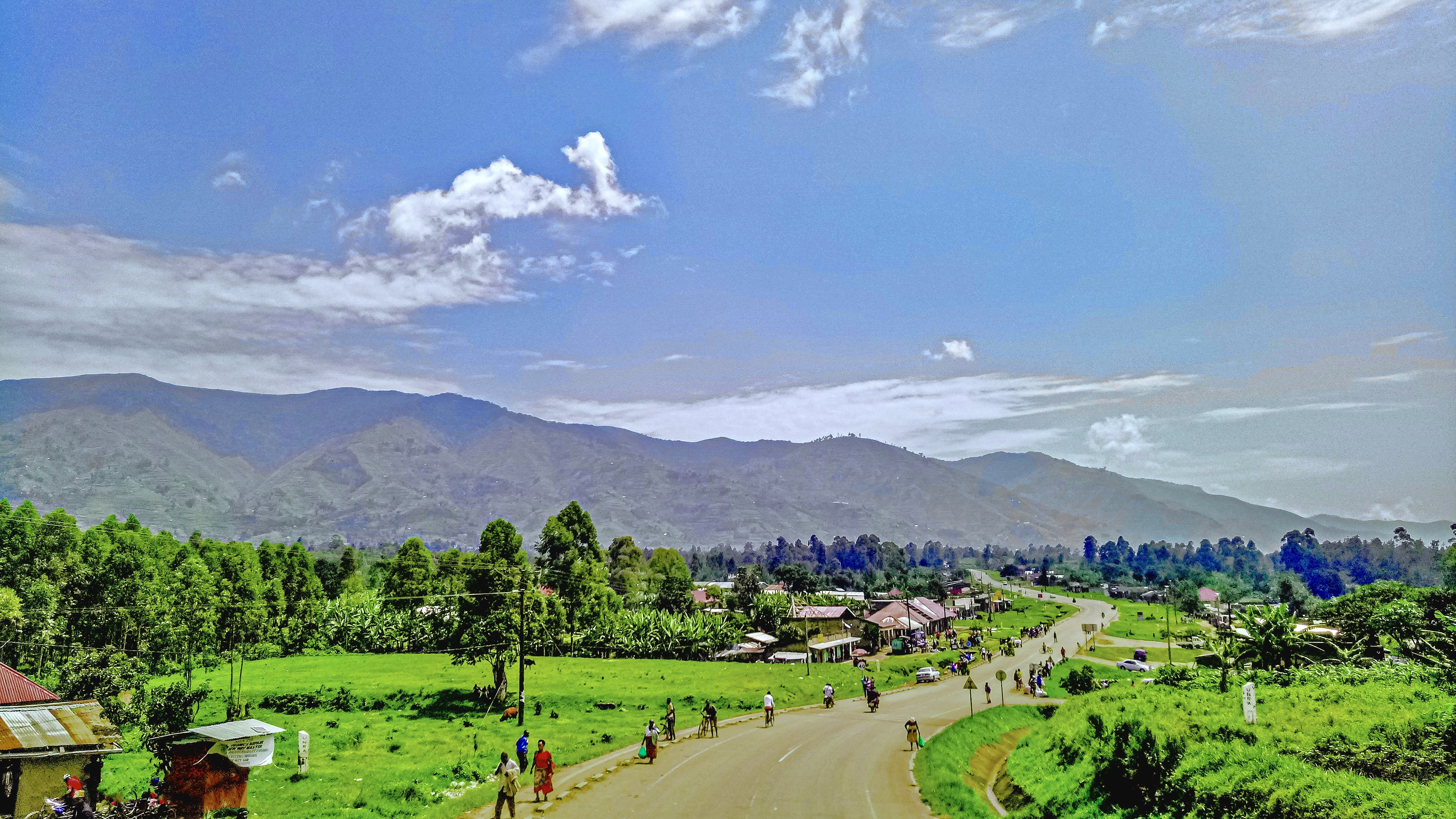
Bundibugyo road with the Rwenzori ranges

The Vonoma people (Tribe) are the smallest tribe in Uganda. Their existing population is approximately 2,613, they are one of Africa's smallest tribes. They are an indigenous tribe that is on the verge of extinction. They have their own language and tribal customs that they adhere to this day. The Vonoma people live in present-day Bundibugyo district in South-Western Uganda. Some Vonoma people migrated from Dr. Congo while fleeing from forced labor orchestrated by the Belgian rule in Congo. Today, the Vonoma people have settled and mixed with other tribes like Baamba, Babwisi, and Batwa in Bundibugyo district. They are led by Omudhingiya (King) called Omudhingiya Martin Kamya Ayongi.

== See also ==
- Gisu People
- Buganda
- Ugandan Traditions
- Ugandan Folklore
