= Ekyalakanu =

Ugandan dish made by mixing raw blood mixed with milk

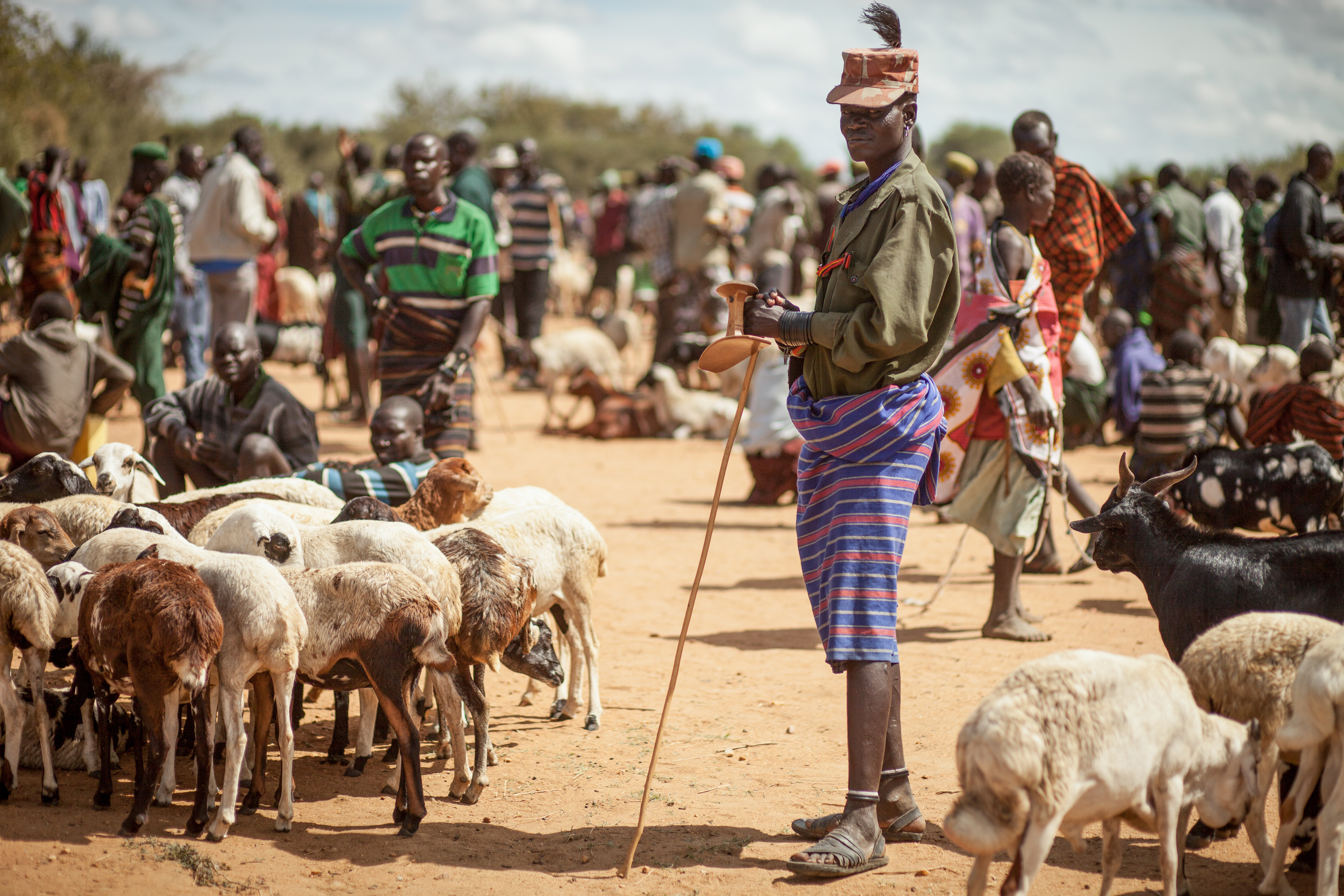
Karamojong Shepherd

Ekyalakanu is a common traditional delicacy consumed by the Karamojong people, a Nilotic ethnic group in Karamoja sub-region in the northerneastern Uganda, drinking raw blood mixed with milk. The tradition has existed for decades within the nomadic Karamojong community. The traditional practice is carried out in special occasions like marriages rites, wars, and celebrations after a successful hunting and in celebration of twin-births where ghee is added to sorghum porridge mixed with milk and blood then given to the twins to drink. The blood is harvested by spearing the cow on the neck to create an overflow of blood which is collected in a saucepan and later mixed with blood for consumption. In Karamoja, animals are rarely killed for meat, once they naturally die, the meat is eaten. this practice ensures lager heard of cattle that produces more milk and blood.

== See also ==
- Acholi
- Lango
- Gisu
- Turkana
- Pokot
