= Prime Minister of Bugwe =

- Coat of arms of Samia-Bugwe

- Flag of Samia-Bugwe
- Incumbent; Arafat Barasa Egessa since 2025
- Style: The Right Honourable
- Appointer: The Omwenengo
- Term length: At His Royal Highness' pleasure
- Formation: 2017

The Prime Minister of Bugwe is the head of government of the Kingdom of Bugwe (commonly known as Samia-Bugwe), one of the traditional kingdoms within Uganda. The Prime Minister is subordinate to and appointed by the monarch of Bugwe, the Omwenengo. The Prime Minister chairs the cabinet of ministers of Samia-Bugwe, exercises the day-to-day governance of the kingdom, and acts as a spokesman for the Omwenengo.
