= Batagwenda =

Ethnic group in Uganda

Batagwenda people are a tribe found in Kitagwenda, Rubirizi district, Kamwenge district, and Kabarole districts of Western Uganda. The Batagwenda people originated from Baganda tribe after disagreements leading to tribal clashes and settled in Kitagwenda. They practice agriculture like planting cassava, sweet potatoes, millet, and livestock rearing which include cattle and goats. They live in the areas around Lake George and Ntara Hills. The Batagwenda people practice the "Empaako" naming systems used by many tribes in western Uganda.

== See also ==
- Gisu
- Lango people
- Acholi
- Baganda
- Banyankole
