= Imbalu =

Ceremony practiced by the Bamasaba people of Uganda

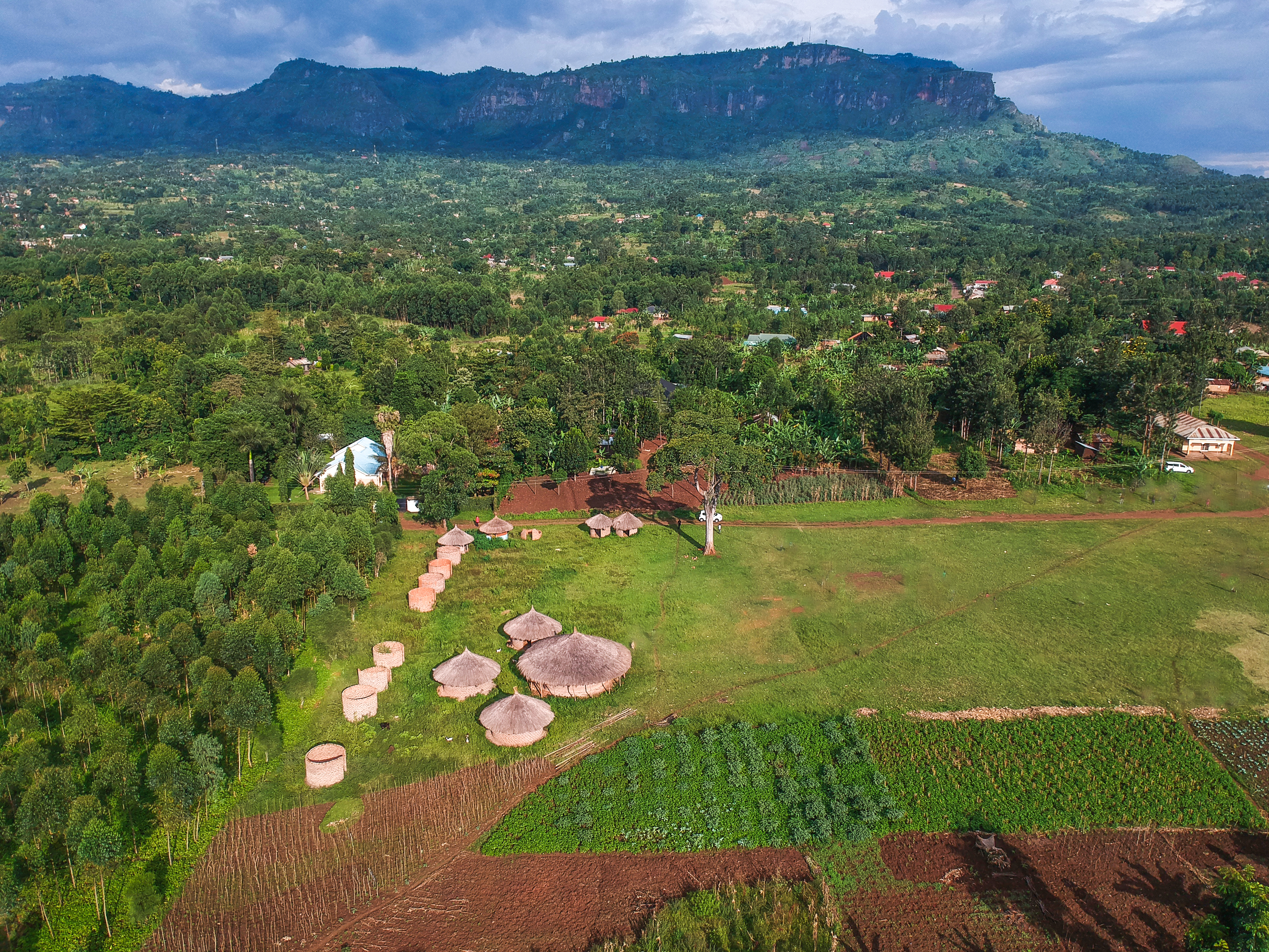
Mutoto Circumcision Site

Imbalu is a public circumcision ceremony practiced by the Bamasaba people of Uganda. It takes place at the Mutoto cultural site (also called Mutoto cultural ground) near Mbale in eastern Uganda. It is mostly active in the 8th month of every even year. According to Bamasaaba cultural tradition, the site is associated with the circumcision of the first Mugisu. This community affair is characterized by dance and food. The ceremony has been heavily promoted as a tourist attraction, and tens of thousands of people attend. Imbalu marks the initiation of boys into manhood and every year, hundreds of boys aged 16 and above qualify for the Imbalu. In 2022, about 6,000 boys were initiated into manhood during the cultural ceremony that happens every year. This is because the ceremony had not happened ever since 2020 when Uganda was locked down due to the outbreak of COVID-19 pandemic.

The age old tradition defines and unites the people in Bugisu sub-region including the Bamasaba people of Mbale, Manafwa, Bulambuli, Sironko and Bududa districts. This is because they are believed to be descendants of Masaba.

== Cultural meaning and ritual process ==
Among the Bamasaaba, Imbalu is traditionally understood as a rite of passage through which boys are initiated into manhood. The initiate is expected to endure the public circumcision without visibly showing fear or pain, a display associated with courage, maturity and readiness for adult responsibilities within the community.

The ceremony is not limited to the act of circumcision. It includes cultural preparation, dancing, singing, beer brewing, visits to relatives and ceremonial gatherings before and after the cutting ritual.

Traditionally, successful initiation was associated with entry into adult social responsibilities, including marriage, inheritance, family leadership and participation in community life. The practice has also been associated with ideas of courage, discipline and social responsibility within Bamasaaba cultural belief systems.

The ceremony is closely associated with Kadodi music and dance performances, which accompany initiates and community celebrations throughout the circumcision season.

== Origins and cultural leadership ==
According to Bamasaaba oral traditions, the origins of the community and the practice of Imbalu are associated with ancestral figures including Mundu and Seera. Cultural narratives recorded in public accounts and local heritage sources connect the tradition to Mount Elgon and to early Bamasaaba identity formation.

Historically, Imbalu was organized through clans, families and local cultural structures. In contemporary practice, the institution of the Umukuka wa Bamasaaba, the cultural leader of the Bamasaaba, also plays a ceremonial role in the launch and observance of the circumcision season, especially at Mutoto Cultural Grounds near Mbale.

== Public health and contemporary practice ==
The practice has undergone changes in response to public health concerns, including HIV/AIDS and COVID-19. During the COVID-19 pandemic, the World Health Organization worked with local leaders and health authorities to promote safer observance of the ceremony while maintaining cultural practice.

In recent years, some communities and organizers have adopted additional hygiene measures during the circumcision season, including the use of separate blades for initiates in order to reduce infection risks.

== See also ==
- Gisu people
- Circumcision in Africa
- Female Genital Mutilation in Africa
- Dominica Dipio
