= Nyero rock paintings =

Rock paintings in eastern Uganda

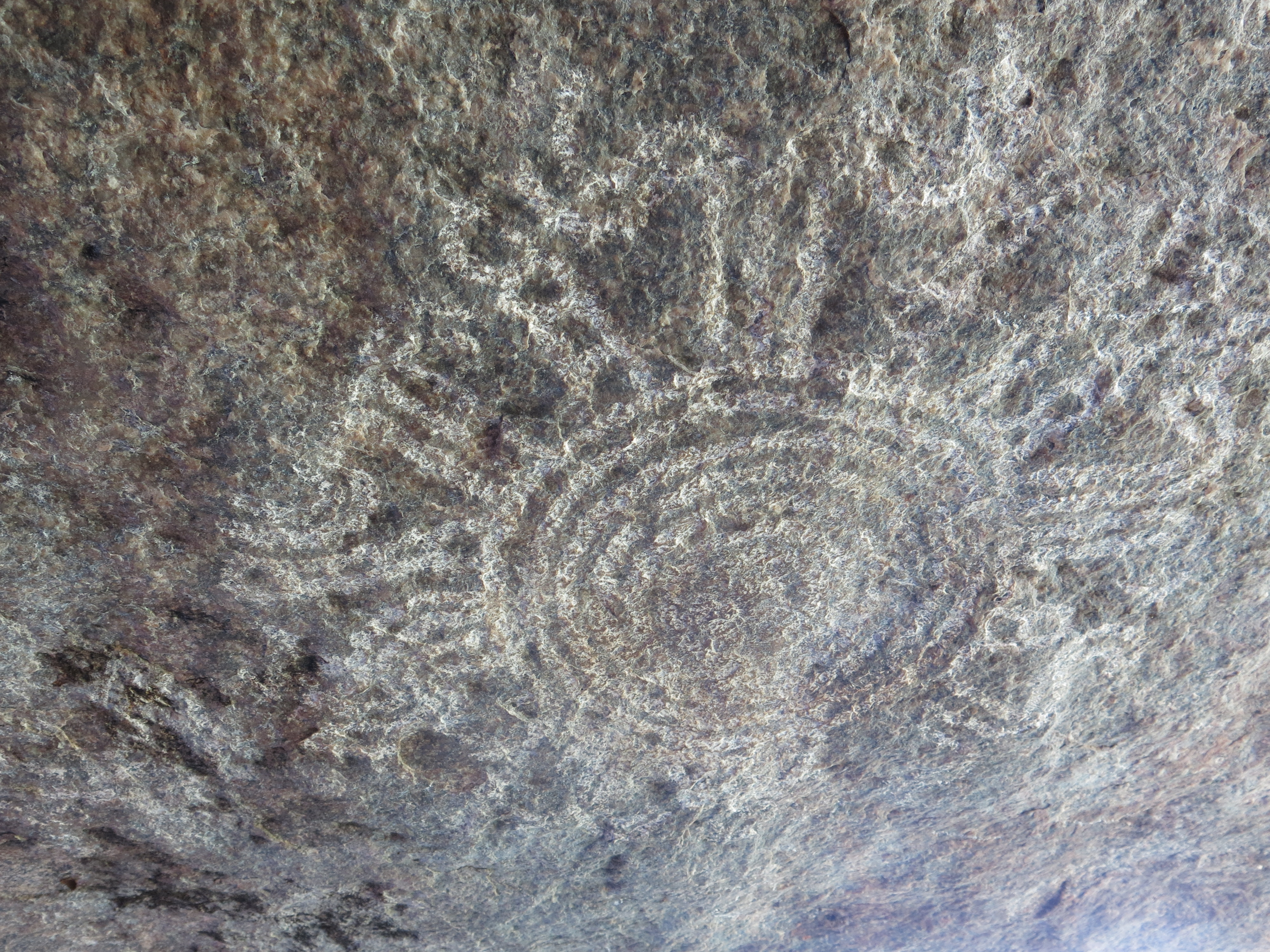
- White concentric circles in one of the Nyero caves (Nyero 3)

- Location in Uganda
- 1°28′17.5″N 33°50′46.4″E
- Type: Cave, rock paintings
- Periods: <1250 CE
- Cultures: Teso
- Location: Kumi District
- Region: East African Rift, Uganda

The Nyero rock paintings are located in eastern Uganda in Kumi District, 8 km (5.0 mi) west of Kumi town, about 250 km (155.3 mi) from the capital city Kampala. The Nyero rock paintings are among the most important rock art in Uganda.

== History ==
Nyero rock paintings date to before 1250 CE. They were first documented in 1913 and later described by researchers as largely of geometric nature. This type of rock art is part of a homogeneous tradition often depicted in red pigment, spreading across east, central and parts of southern Africa, matching the distribution of the Late Stone Age hunter-gatherer culture. This art is generally attributed to Batwa (Twa) hunter-gatherers who are of Pygmy origin, and are today, in Eastern Africa, only found in small groups near the Rwanda/Uganda border and eastern Congo. It is likely that Twa hunter-gatherer communities once lived in the general area of these rock art sites, probably moving on due to the arrival of the present inhabitants (Nilotic, Luo, and Bantu groups). The paintings enrich the cultural identity of the people of Iteso, Uganda, and Africa as a whole.

== Description ==
Nyero rock art site has six shelters (Nyero 1, 2, 3, 4, 5 and 6). They are described below.

=== Nyero 1 ===
This is a small rock shelter formed by a low overhanging rock perched above three supporting rocks. On the outer edge of the overhang are six sets of concentric circles in white, together with paintings in the shape of ‘acacia pods’.

=== Nyero 2 ===
This is the main shelter, it has a 10 m (32.8 ft) high vertical rock against the back wall and an overhang formed by the breaking away of an enormous boulder estimated to weigh at least 20,000 tons. The overhang protects the paintings from direct rain and rocks in front and to the sides protect the paintings from the sun. The paintings are all done in shades of red. Concentric circles are the dominant form and more than forty different drawings were identified. There is one large ‘acacia pod’ design that has also been called a canoe. On the south-eastern side of the shelter, a narrow passage between the boulders leads to a small, dark shelter where there is a small cavity known as the ‘pocket’ where the early inhabitants used to offer gifts to there gods after receiving help from them. Members of the local community still follow a tradition of placing money there either before or after receiving help from ancestral spirits.

=== Nyero 3 ===
This shelter is at the far northern end of the Inselberg and about 8 minutes walk from Nyero 2. It is formed by a large boulder perched on top of supporting rocks with no standing room. Once inside the artificial protecting wall, visitors have to crouch low down to reach the far end where another artificial wall makes it less dangerous and allows a wide view of the land below. The painting consists of white concentric circles; the outer circles are surrounded by double curved designs, between which are double lines divided into smaller compartments.

=== Nyero 4 ===
This is a small shelter on the south-western side of the hill where there are a few traces of red finger-painted concentric circles, two conical shapes and lines.

=== Nyero 5 ===
This is situated on the western side of the hill near to the primary school, has a red geometric motif composed of a combination of circular and linear shapes made with both a brush and a finger. Unfortunately, part of it has been damaged by natural water erosion.

=== Nyero 6 ===
This is situated high on top of the hill and has a good view of the surrounding countryside. There are traces of red pigment forming two finger-painted outlines of small oval shapes and a slanting L-shape as well as an outlined cross with a small circle below. The painted surface is exfoliating and is open to the rain and morning sun.

== Intangible heritage ==
The rock art sites are believed to have been sacred places of the gods. The red and white paintings remain valuable to the people of Teso but are also mysterious since the painters are unknown. In the past, the Iteso people of Nyero would sacrifice and pay offerings to the gods for problems of rain, misfortune, blessings and child bearing (Nyero 3). Individual and clan prayers were held on a seasonal basis. Oral history has recorded strong attachment to sites though people were stopped from praying in the 1970s by the Government at the time. Traces of smoke from sacrifices are still visible in some of the caves. The association of a sacred prayer place in the buffer zone continues to draw nearby communities to the site.

== Legal protections ==
The legal framework for protecting heritage is the 1995 constitution of the Republic of Uganda, under national objectives and directive principles of state policy (XXV), which obligates the state to preserve and protect Uganda's heritage. In addition, Article 178 (13) of the same constitution also allows the state to gazette, own and manage the national cultural sites. The constitution further, in article 189(1) schedule 6(10), mandates the central Government to manage national monuments, antiquities and archives.

The Historical Monuments Act of 1967 and amendment decree 1977 govern the protection of Cultural Property in Uganda. The Historical Monuments Act 1967 Cap 46 provides for preservation and protection of historical monuments and objects of archaeological, paleontological, ethnographical and traditional interest. Rock Art sites and properties of cultural significance identified, preserved and promoted are legally protected properties of the State. Any destruction, alteration or other offences are convicted to six months imprisonment or a fine.

== World Heritage status ==
This site was added to the UNESCO World Heritage Tentative List on 10 September 1997, in the Cultural category.

== Access ==
The rock paintings are easily accessible from the gravel road between Kumi and Ngora, appr. 1 km west of Nyero. An entrance fee is collected and a guided tour is provided at the entrance gate (opened daily). A guide will recite the history of the place and take visitors around the caves.

== Bibliography ==
- Namono, Catherine (2010). A contextual interpretive approach to the rock art of Uganda. PhD thesis. pp. 1–350.
