= Catherine Namono =

Ugandan archaeologist

- Born: Mbale, Uganda
- Education: Trinity College Nabbingo (High School Diploma); Makerere University (Bachelor of Arts in Art History) (Master of Arts in Art History); University of the Witwatersrand (Master of Arts in Rock Art Studies) (Doctor of Philosophy in Archaeology)
- Occupations: Archaeologist and Art Historian
- Years active: 2000–present

Catherine Namono is a Ugandan archaeologist and art historian who specializes in the study of Rock art. She is the first Ugandan woman to qualify as an archaeologist.

== Early life ==
Catherine Namono was born in Uganda to parents Joyce Apaku and Engineer Martin Wambwa. She attended Fairway Primary School in Mbale. She then transferred to Mount Saint Mary's College Namagunga, in Mukono District, for her O-Level education. She then went to Trinity College, an all-girls boarding school located in Nabbingo, Wakiso District, where she completed her A-Level education, graduating with a High School Diploma.

== Extended education ==
Namono was admitted into Makerere University, Uganda's oldest and largest, public university, graduating with a Bachelor of Arts degree in Art history. She went on to pursue a post-graduate degree in the same subject, graduating with a Master of Arts degree in Art history, also from Makerere University.

She then re-located to South Africa. Due to her desire to explore further the subject of rock art and rock painting, she enrolled into the University of the Witwatersrand in Johannesburg, graduating with a Master of Arts degree in Rock art. During her master's program in Johannesburg, she analyzed a distinct rock art tradition practiced by Bantu speakers. Namono explored the rock art produced by the Bantu and noticed that there was a rock art theme associated with boys' and girls' initiation. When Namono went to examine the boys' art, she noted that the art was covered by previous archaeologist which caused her to study the girls' art instead, also known as the virgin area located in the Limpopo region of South Africa. That second master's degree marked her shift from art history to archaeology.

Namono went on to pursue doctoral studies in her new specialty, graduating in 2010 with a Doctor of Philosophy degree in archaeology at the University of the Witwatersrand. With this qualification, she became the first Ugandan woman to qualify as an archaeologist with a doctoral degree in the subject. Simultaneously, she became the second-ever Ugandan to obtain a PhD in archaeology, after the late Professor David Mulindwa Kiyaga.

== Career ==
Namono specializes in rock art research, particularly the rock art of Uganda. She is also a Ugandan rock art specialist working at the Rock Art Research Institute at the University of the Witwatersrand in Johannesburg. She is also currently conducting another study on the pygmy rock art tradition and rock art in Kondowa in Tanzania. Her contributions to this fairly understudied field has increased the data base on rock art in the Lake Victoria basin as well as shed light on the understandings of this rock art with her interpretations.

Uganda's rock art has not been thoroughly examined along with the fact that source and date of this art remains unidentified because of the unclear geometric symbols.
