= Nahaama III =

Reigning King of Samia-Bugwe

Robert Nahaama III

Omwenengo of Bugwe
- Reign: 2 March 2023 - present
- Coronation: 14 March 2023
- Predecessor: Philip Nahaama II
Names
- Robert Obara Nahaama III
- House: Balundu

Robert Obara Nahaama III is the reigning Omwenengo (king) of the Samia-Bugwe Kingdom in eastern Uganda. He succeeded to the throne in 2023 following the death of his father, Philip Nahaama II.

== Early life and family ==
Robert Obara was born to Philip Wanyama, the future Nahaama II. He is a great-grandson of Yusuf Obara, the final pre-colonial Omwenengo of Bugwe, and a member of the Balundu royal clan.

Prior to becoming king Obara was a lawyer, having studied law at Makerere University.

== Reign ==
Robert Obara was the designated heir to the throne of his father, Philip Nahaama II. Following Nahaama II's death on 2 March 2023, Obara was proclaimed the ninth Omwenengo, taking the regnal name Nahaama III.

As king, Nahaama III has undertaken part in charitable and development efforts by the kingdom, and called for dialogue and increased investment from politicians.
