= Uganda National Contemporary Ballet =

Uganda National Contemporary Ballet or UNCB is a Ugandan dance company established in 2007 as Burudani Dance Company.

== History ==
On September 16, 2007, with the backing of Alliance Française and the UGCS/Goethe Institute, Black & White and Memories of Child Soldiers were presented for the first time at the Ndere Centre in Kampala. The performances, involving 15 professional Ugandan dancers and choreographed by Valerie Miquel, was so popular that the group went on to form the Burudani Dance Company that is being head by Valerie Miquel as the Company Director.

== Composition ==
- Patron: John Nagenda, Senior Presidential Adviser, Media & Public Relations Republic of Uganda
- Director: Valérie Miquel
- Assistant Director : Peter Kalifa
- Choreographer: Valérie Miquel
- Percussionist: Samuel Nalangira
- Dancers: Ricky Obonyo, Peter Kalifa, Sarah Zawedde, Valerie Miquel, Mayambala Jonathan, Herbert Ssimbwa, and Shafik Walusimbi

== Profile ==
In November 2007, the company was featured in a broadcast to a well known French-German TV programme Arte Metropolis. In February 2008 UNCB performed for the President of Germany and his delegation, as well as for representatives of the government of Uganda under Burudani Dance Company. UNCB has toured France in May 2008, Germany in September to October 2008, and East Africa in October 2008. Since March 2009, Burudani Dance Company changed its name to the Uganda National Contemporary Ballet (UNCB). UNCB performs a minimum of two shows a month at the National Theatre in Kampala and several shows at corporate functions at Serena hotel, Sheraton Hotel, Hotel Africana plus many such venues like Munyoyo etc.

UNCB has also created pieces for the following : Goethe Centre, Alliance Française, Europe Uganda Village, Orange, International Women Organization, Goethe Centrum, the Global 2009 Smart Partnership Dialogue, Rotary Club, Thermal Cool Uganda, Ugandan Wildlife Authority to help celebrate the International Year of the Gorilla, Japanese Embassy, Fang Fang Restaurant (Chinese New Year), Norwegian Embassy, as part of an international workshop for women’s rights, for the prevention of domestic violence in Uganda.
