= Rock art of Uganda =

Rock Art Sites in Uganda

Within the African nation of Uganda there is rock art that "sits within a broad geometric rock art belt straddling East and Central Africa." More specifically, "In Uganda, rock art is mostly concentrated in eastern part of the country, especially in the districts of Kumi, Pallisa and Kaberamaido." The rock art has a few aspects that make it unique. Most of it is geometric art with circular, rectangular, sausage, dot and lines making up the basic shapes. These shapes occur repeatedly throughout the country. Some shapes do occur more frequently than others. Catherine Namono notes that "concentric circles are the most commonly painted shapes in the rock art of Uganda." There are also concentric circles with rays coming out of them, possibly representing the sun. Red was the most common color along with white, or both creating a bi-chrome pigment.

== Archaeology ==
Not only have they found rock paintings at sites but they also have found lithic assemblages and pottery assemblages as well. The most challenging part of this kind of archaeology is dating the rock art, as radiocarbon is not possible. Other artifacts found on sites are often used to try to date the paintings uncovered. Another worry about archaeology for rock art is weathering can also occur, especially because the art is exposed to the weather almost always. Almost all rock art in Africa is put on open-faces, exposed completely to the elements. Because of weathering we have lose some information but a lot of the rock art still survives. Vandalism has also been reported at sites.

The archaeological relevance of these paintings is apparent in just their appearance. If there was ever a way to without a doubt know that what the meanings of these paintings were then we would have a window into cultural thought. Archaeologists strive to better understand cultures of the past, figuring out the meanings behind these paintings could help archaeologists to better understand what culture made them.

== Important sites ==
Nyero is one of the most important rock art sites not just in Uganda but in Africa as well. It has well-preserved rock paintings that are utilized in study of rock art.

=== Nyero ===
The Nyero site was discovered by C.A.E Harwich in 1945. Nyero was the first rock art site to be catalogued and described in full within Uganda. Nyero itself is composed of granite, and just under 40m high. There are two areas of the site which are considered to be shelters. Nyero 1 is a small one with only a small overhang of 2m. Nyero 2 is much larger with a 16m overhang and is where the most rock paintings have been found.

==== Nyero 1 ====
This is a very small portion of rock paintings in comparison with those at Nyero 2. They consist of several concentric circles and all the paintings are white, no red was found here. Overlapping of the paintings may suggest that there were several time periods of painting.

==== Nyero 2 ====
The main group of paintings cover a panel that is 13.5m long and 6m broad. Throughout time weathering has occurred, mostly vertical weathering from water coming down the face of the rock. Vandalism has also played a part is of lessening these paintings. Concentric circles make up the main part of the large panel of paintings. 47 have been counted with a variety of sizes, some being only 8 cm and other being recorded at 75 cm. There are three to seven circles each concentric circular pattern. Another prominent shape at this site is the canoe shape. The longest would have been two and half meters when it was fully intact. Not all the canoes are the same, some are more angular while others are more rounded, in relation to how the canoe is drawn. Six canoes have been recorded here. Other traditional shapes are also present such dots, dashes and u-shaped drawings.

== Symbolism of the art ==
The symbolism behind this rock art has also been debated for a long time. There are a couple of different theories that may be discussed keeping in mind there is no way to prove any of the theories. There is one problem with trying to interpret these paintings. While, most rock paintings depict humans or animals, rock paintings in Uganda this is not the case. Being abstract in nature makes it much more challenging to understand what the creators were trying to convey.

On that note here a few theories about what the rock paintings are. The concentric circles with what appears to be rays have been associated with chiefs. Michael G. Kenny makes the argument that these sun-shapes are connected with chief figures. The spiral, something that can be defined as the same thing as a concentric circle, is considered a symbol for chiefs.

Another interpretation depends more strongly on the theory that pygmies created the rock art. Based on that theory there have been a lot interpretations that the art is based on astronomy of the pygmy culture. There is also the common theory that these paintings were associated with some kind ritual.

These theories are based on pure interpretation with none of them being proven. There is no way really knowing what the artist intent was.

== Pygmy debate ==
There has been quite a bit of debate about who the creators of this rock art were. Since there is no way to properly date rock art, there is no way to know with certainty who created these paintings. Radiocarbon dating is not possible on these paintings. Even so, Colin M. Turnbull makes the argument that pygmies are responsible for this art. "Pygmy" can be defined as the forest-dwelling hunter-gatherers of the Congo Basin. The term pygmy is debated as well, since it could be inferred as culturally insensitive. To be more specific the Batwa, a subculture of the Twa, are believed to have created this art. They live in Uganda down all the way to the Democratic Republic of Congo. Adopting to living conditions of the swamp and deserts these people only numbered 80,000 in 2000. Many of them have been turned out from their homes and dominated by other culture, more specifically the Bantu expansion affected their land immensely. Many don't even speak their original language but the one of whoever happened to take their land. In the past, the Batwa had a much larger population and more habitation to make a living. First, the Bantu expansion set them back, then colonization and now modernization is putting pressure on these people as well. Contemporary Batwa are far from what they used to be. "In 2007, it was reported that with no source of income, over 40 percent of the Batwa in the Rwanda earned a living through begging." Daily life is a struggle for many pygmies now. Yet, there is no mistaking this culture that was once great. If the theories are correct then these peoples created a great art work.

Pygmies creating these paintings is the number one theory about who created this art. Even without radiocarbon dating there are some way to estimate the dates. Through the excavation of sites such as Nyero, artifacts, uncovered projectile points, date to about 15,000 B.P. The artifacts can fairly confidently be dated to the Later Stone Age. This means that rock paintings can be associated with the Later Stone Age as well, not with one hundred percent confidence though.

== Later Stone Age (LSA) ==
The Later Stone Age is a chronological term only is used in Africa. The two distinct time periods before this one in Africa are the Early Stone Age (ESA) and the Middle Stone Age (MSA). Together the timelines are relatively similar to those in European prehistory but they differ in important ways. Rock art in Uganda is typically attributed to the LSA, a time period in which many scholars used to note the appearance of modern human behavior. From 40,000 years ago, we see changes in behavior and tool assemblages that make up sites. Tools are more advanced, more planning was needed and more care was taken with the tools. Bones tools also seem to make their first recorded appearance in the LSA. This idea that humans gained their modern behavior has led to the idea that the rock paintings were completed in the LSA, due to the fact that humans, by then, could think abstractly. Still, the idea that modern human behavior emerged in the LSA has changed. Now, scholars are much more inclined to say that modern human behavior began in the MSA, due to findings at sites such Blombos Cave and Pinnacle Point. The LSA is the time period in which modern humans did leave Africa, spreading across the world in a few generations.

== The rest of Africa ==
Despite the focus on Uganda there is rock art outside of Uganda. There is a few things that the rock art of Africa and the rock art of Uganda have in common. The subjects are not similar for most of Africa with the art depicting: giraffes, ostriches, elephants, rhinoceros, antelope and humans. Either the art is painted or drawn onto the surface of the rocks or it is engraved instead with variation depending on the site. As for the sites with rock art present, they are spread across Africa stretching from north to south. There is a concentration to the very south and scattered across the northern half of Africa. The central section has less art then north or south. Most of the rock art can be dated to have been created during the LSA sometime.
