= Early history of Uganda =

The early history of Uganda comprises the history of Uganda before the territory that is today Uganda was made into a British protectorate at the end of the 19th century. Prior to this, the region was divided between several closely related kingdoms.

== Earliest history ==
Paleolithic evidence of human activity in Uganda goes back to at least 50,000 years, and perhaps as far as 100,000 years, as shown by the Acheulean stone tools recovered from the former environs of Lake Victoria, which were exposed along the Kagera River valley, chiefly around Nsonezi. Rock art in Uganda, particularly in the eastern part of the country, attests to occupation during the Later Stone Age as well.

Uganda's position along the central African Rift Valley, its favourable climate at an altitude of 1,200 meters and above, and reliable rainfall around the Lake Victoria Basin made it attractive to African cultivators and herders as early as the fourth century BCE. Core samples from the bottom of Lake Victoria have revealed that dense rainforest once covered the land around the lake. Centuries of cultivation removed almost all the original tree cover.

Central Sudanic peoples and Kuliak speakers were likely the first farmers and herders in Uganda. Central Sudanic peoples first entered Northern Uganda by at least 4,000 BCE and sometime later spread as far south as the Kigezi sub-region in southwestern Uganda by 3,000 BCE. The Ancient Kuliak presence in Uganda can be seen in Kansyore Pottery and ancient Pollen samples.

=== Bantu expansion ===
Bantu speaking farmers first arrived in far-southern Uganda in the year 1000BC. They also raised goats and chickens, and they probably kept some cattle by 400 BCE. Their knowledge of agriculture and use of iron-forging technology permitted them to clear the land and feed ever larger numbers of settlers. They displaced small bands of indigenous hunter-gatherers, who relocated to the less accessible mountains.

Meanwhile, by the fourth century BCE, the Bantu-speaking metallurgists were perfecting iron smelting to produce medium grade carbon steel in pre-heated forced-draft furnaces. Although most of these developments were taking place southwest of modern Ugandan boundaries, iron was mined and smelted in many parts of the country not long afterward.

== Early political systems ==
As the Bantu-speaking agriculturists of the Uganda area spread and multiplied over the centuries, they evolved a form of government by clan chiefs. This kinship-organized system was useful for coordinating work projects, settling internal disputes, and carrying out religious observances to clan deities, but it could effectively govern only a limited number of people. Larger polities began to form states towards the end of the first millennium CE, some of which would ultimately govern over a million subjects each. More extensive and improved cultivation of Bananas (high-yield crops that allowed for permanent cultivation and settlements) by Bantu groups between 300 and 1200 CE helped this process.

Nilotic speaking pastoralists who lived in the more arid and less fertile North were mobile and ready to resort to arms in defence of their cattle or in raids to appropriate the cattle of others. But their political organization was less, based on kinship and decisions by kin-group elders. In the meeting of cultures, they may have acquired the ideas and symbols of political chiefship from the Bantu speakers, to whom they could offer military protection, and with whose elites they sometimes joined and intermarried. It is theorized a system of patron-client relationships developed, whereby a pastoral elite emerged, entrusting the care of cattle to subjects who used the manure to improve the fertility of their increasingly overworked gardens and fields.

In some regions, pastoral elites were of partly Nilotic descent, while in others they may have derived mainly from the Bantu population (so theorized by the linguist David L. Schoenbrun from certain of those relatives of wealthy banana cultivators who were not eligible for inheritance). The latter had gradually adopted specialist pastoralism as a source of wealth in the area's rich grasslands. The earliest states may have been established in the 15th century by a group of pastoral rulers called the Chwezi. Legends depicted the Chwezi as supernatural beings, but their material remains at the archaeological sites of Bigo and Mubende have shown that they were human and perhaps among the ancestors of the modern Hima and Tutsi pastoralists of Uganda, Rwanda and Burundi. During the 15th century, the Chwezi were displaced by a new Nilotic-speaking pastoral group called the Bito. The Chwezi appear to have moved south of present-day Uganda to establish kingdoms in northwest Tanzania, Rwanda, and Burundi.

From this process of cultural contact and state formation, three different types of states emerged. The Hima type was later to be seen in Rwanda and Burundi. It preserved a caste system whereby the rulers and their pastoral relatives attempted to maintain strict separation from the agricultural subjects, called Hutu. The Hima rulers lost their Nilotic language and became Bantu speakers, but they preserved an ideology of superiority in political and social life and attempted to monopolise high status and wealth. In the 20th century, the Hutu revolt after independence led to the expulsion from Rwanda of the Hima elite, who became refugees in Uganda. A counter-revolution in Burundi secured power for the Hima through periodic massacres of the Hutu majority.

The Bito type of state, in contrast with that of the Hima, was established in Bunyoro, which for several centuries was the dominant political power in the region. Bito immigrants displaced the influential Hima and secured power for themselves as a royal clan, ruling over Hima pastoralists and Hutu agriculturalists alike. No rigid caste lines divided Bito society. The weakness of the Bito ideology was that, in theory, it granted every Bito clan member royal status and with it the eligibility to rule. Although some of these ambitions might be fulfilled by the Bunyoro omukama (ruler) granting his kin offices as governors of districts, there was always the danger of a coup d'état or secession by overambitious relatives. Thus, in Bunyoro, periods of political stability and expansion were interrupted by civil wars and secessions.

=== Buganda ===
The third type of state to emerge in Uganda was that of Buganda, on the northern shores of Lake Victoria. This area of swamp and hillside was not attractive to the rulers of pastoral states farther north and west. There, as in the nearby Haya kingdom of west Tanzania, the wealth of the ruling class continued to depend more on banana lands and groves than cattle, and no sharp caste-like distinction between farmers and herders formed. Buganda became a refuge area, however, for those who wished to escape rule by Bunyoro or for factions within Bunyoro who were defeated in contests for power.

According to Rita M. Byrnes, one such group from Bunyoro, headed by Prince Kimera, arrived in Buganda early in the 15th century. Assimilation of refugee elements had already strained the ruling abilities of Buganda's various clan chiefs and a supraclan political organization was already emerging. Kimera seized the initiative in this trend and became the first effective Kabaka (ruler) of the fledgling Buganda state. Ganda oral traditions later sought to disguise this intrusion from Bunyoro by claiming earlier, shadowy, quasi-supernatural kabakas. Other researchers, Baganda and historians have a different take on the origin of the Baganda and Buganda. Some believe that the first King or Kabaka was called Kintu and whereas some believe in a creation myth involving Kintu and Nnambi.

Unlike the Hima caste system or the Bunyoro royal clan political monopoly, Buganda's kingship was made a kind of state lottery in which all clans could participate. Each new king was identified with the clan of his mother, rather than that of his father. All clans readily provided wives to the ruling kabaka, who had eligible sons by most of them. When the ruler died, his successor was chosen by clan elders from among the eligible princes, each of whom belonged to the clan of his mother. In this way, the throne was never the property of a single clan for more than one reign. Bunyoro's power began to ebb in the 18th century, with the separation of the Toro kingdom and more importantly the rise of Buganda.

Consolidating their efforts behind a centralised kingship, the Baganda (people of Buganda) shifted away from defensive strategies and toward expansion. By the mid-19th century, Buganda had doubled and redoubled its territory, conquering much of Bunyoro and becoming the dominant state in the region. Newly conquered lands were placed under chiefs nominated by the king. Buganda's armies and the royal tax collectors traveled swiftly to all parts of the kingdom along specially constructed roads which crossed streams and swamps by bridges and viaducts. On Lake Victoria (which the Baganda called Nnalubaale), a royal navy of outrigger canoes, commanded by an admiral who was chief of the Lungfish clan, could transport Baganda commandos to raid any shore of the lake. The journalist Henry Morton Stanley visited Buganda in 1875 and provided an estimate of Buganda troop strength. Stanley counted 125,000 troops marching off on a single campaign to the east, where a fleet of 230 war canoes waited to act as auxiliary naval support.

In Buganda's capital, Lubaga, Stanley found a well-ordered town of about 40,000 surrounding the king's palace, which was situated atop a commanding hill. A wall more than four kilometers in circumference surrounded the palace compound, which was filled with grass-roofed houses, meeting halls, and storage buildings. At the entrance to the court burned the royal fire, which would only be extinguished when the Kabaka died. Thronging the grounds were foreign ambassadors seeking audiences, chiefs going to the royal advisory council, messengers running errands, and a corps of young pages, who served the Kabaka while training to become future chiefs. For communication across the kingdom, the messengers were supplemented by drum signals.

Most communities in Uganda, however, were not organized on such a vast political scale. To the north, the Nilotic-speaking Acholi people adopted some of the ideas and regalia of kingship from Bunyoro in the 18th century. Rwots (chiefs) acquired royal drums, collected tribute from followers, and redistributed it to those who were most loyal. The mobilisation of larger numbers of subjects permitted successful hunts for meat. Extensive areas of bushland were surrounded by beaters, who forced the game to a central killing point in a hunting technique that was still practised in areas of central Africa as of 1990. But these Acholi chieftaincies remained relatively small in size, and within them the power of the clans remained strong enough to challenge that of the rwot.

== Long-distance trade and foreign contact (1800s–) ==
Until the middle of the 19th century, Uganda remained relatively isolated from the outside world. The central African lake region was a world in miniature, with an internal trade system, a great power rivalry between Buganda and Bunyoro, and its own inland seas. When intrusion from the outside world finally came, it was in the form of long-distance trade for ivory.

Ivory had been a staple trade item from the coast of East Africa since before the Christian era. But growing world demand in the 19th century, together with the provision of increasingly efficient firearms to hunters, created a moving "ivory frontier" as elephant herds near the coast were nearly exterminated. Leading large caravans financed by Indian moneylenders, Arab traders based in Zanzibar reached Lake Victoria by 1844. One trader, Ahmad bin Ibrahim, supplied Buganda's Kabaka Ssuuna with cloth made from cotton and silk, and more importantly, guns and gunpowder. Ibrahim also introduced the religion of Islam, but the Kabaka was more interested in guns.

By the 1860s, Buganda was the destination of ever more caravans, and the kabaka and his chiefs began to dress in cloth called "mericani" (derived from "American"), which was woven in Massachusetts and carried to Zanzibar by American traders. It was judged finer in quality than European or Indian cloth and Barkcloth, and increasing numbers of ivory tusks were collected to pay for it. Bunyoro sought to attract foreign trade as well, in an effort to keep up with Buganda in the burgeoning arms race.

Bunyoro (like Buganda) also found itself threatened from the north by Egyptian-sponsored agents who sought ivory and slaves but who, unlike the Arab traders from Zanzibar, were also promoting foreign conquest. In 1869, Khedive Ismail Pasha of Egypt, seeking to annex the territories north of the borders of Lake Victoria and east of Lake Albert and "south of Gondokoro," sent a British explorer, Samuel Baker, on a military expedition to the frontiers of Bunyoro, with the object of suppressing the slave-trade there and opening the way to commerce and civilisation. The khedive appointed Baker Governor-General of the new territory named Equatoria.

The Banyoro resisted Baker, and he had to fight a desperate battle to secure his retreat. Baker regarded the resistance as an act of treachery, and he denounced the Banyoro in a book (Ismailia – A Narrative Of The Expedition To Central Africa For The Suppression Of Slave Trade, Organised By Ismail, Khadive Of Egypt (1874)) that was widely read in Britain. Later British Empire builders arrived in Uganda with a predisposition against Bunyoro, which eventually would cost the kingdom half its territory until the "lost counties" were restored to Bunyoro after independence.

Farther north the Acholi responded more favourably to the Egyptian demand for ivory. They were already famous hunters and quickly acquired guns in return for tusks. The guns permitted the Acholi to retain their independence but altered the balance of power within Acholi territory, which for the first time experienced unequal distribution of wealth based on control of firearms.

Meanwhile, Buganda was receiving not only traded goods and guns but a stream of foreign visitors as well. The explorer John Hanning Speke passed through Buganda in 1862 and claimed he had discovered the source of the Nile. Both Speke and Stanley (based on his 1875 stay in Uganda) wrote books that praised the Baganda for their organisational skills and willingness to modernise. Stanley went further and attempted to convert the king to Christianity. Finding Kabaka Mutesa I apparently receptive, Stanley wrote to the Church Missionary Society (CMS) in London and persuaded it to send missionaries to Buganda in 1877.

Two years after the CMS established a mission, French Catholic White Fathers also arrived at the king's court, and the stage was set for a fierce religious and nationalist rivalry in which Zanzibar-based Muslim traders also participated. By the mid-1880s, all three parties had been successful in converting substantial numbers of Baganda, some of whom attained important positions at court. When a new young kabaka, Mwanga, attempted to halt the foreign ideologies that he saw threatening the state, he was deposed by the armed converts in 1888. A four-year civil war ensued in which the Muslims were initially successful and proclaimed an Islamic state. They were soon defeated, however, and were not able to renew their effort.

The region was greatly weakened by a series of epidemics that hit the region due to its increased exposure to the outside world. The first of these was the rinderpest outbreak of 1891 that devastated the region's cattle. This was followed by outbreaks of sleeping sickness and smallpox that would halve the population of some areas.

The victorious Protestant and Catholic converts then divided the Buganda kingdom, which they ruled through a figurehead kabaka dependent on their guns and goodwill. Thus, outside religion had disrupted and transformed the traditional state. Soon afterwards, the arrival of competing European imperialists — the German Karl Peters and the British captain Frederick Lugard broke the Christian alliance; the British Protestant missionaries urged acceptance of the British flag, while the French Catholic mission either supported the Germans (in the absence of French imperialists) or called for Buganda to retain its independence.

In January 1892, fighting broke out between the Protestant and Catholic Baganda converts. The Catholics quickly gained the upper hand, until Lugard intervened with a prototype machine gun, the Maxim (named after its American inventor, Hiram Maxim). The Maxim decided the issue in favour of the pro-British Protestants; the French Catholic mission was burned to the ground, and the French bishop fled. The resultant scandal was settled in Europe when the British government paid compensation to the French mission and agreed with the Germans who gave up Peters' claim to Uganda in the Anglo-German Agreement of 1890.

With Buganda secured by Lugard, and the Germans no longer contending for control, the British began to enlarge their claim to the "headwaters of the Nile" as they called the land north of Lake Victoria. Allying with the Protestant Baganda chiefs, the British set about conquering the rest of the country, aided by Nubian mercenary troops who had formerly served the khedive of Egypt. Bunyoro had been spared the religious civil wars of Buganda and was firmly united by its king, Kabarega, who had several regiments of troops armed with guns.

After five years of bloody conflict, the British occupied Bunyoro and conquered Acholi and the northern region, and the rough outlines of the Uganda Protectorate came into being. Other African polities, such as the Ankole kingdom to the southwest, signed treaties with the British, as did the chiefdoms of Busoga, but the kinship-based peoples of eastern and northeastern Uganda had to be overcome by military force.

A mutiny by Nubian mercenary troops in 1897 was only barely suppressed after two years of fighting, during which Baganda Christian allies of the British once again demonstrated their support for the colonial power. As a reward for this support, and in recognition of Buganda's formidable military presence, the British negotiated a separate treaty with Buganda, granting it a large measure of autonomy and self-government within the larger protectorate under indirect rule. One-half of Bunyoro's conquered territory was awarded to Buganda as well, including the historic heartland of the kingdom containing several Nyoro (Bunyoro) royal tombs. Buganda doubled in size from ten to twenty counties (sazas), but the "lost counties" of Bunyoro remained a continuing grievance that would return to haunt Buganda in the 1960s.

== See also ==
- History of Uganda
- History of East Africa

== Sources ==
- Byrnes, Rita M., ed. (1992). Uganda: a country study (2nd ed.). Washington, D.C.: Federal Research Division, Library of Congress. ISBN 0-8444-0749-6. OCLC 25831693. This article incorporates text from this source, which is in the public domain.
