= Basamia =

Ethnic group in eastern Uganda and western Kenya

Basamia people are an ethnic group of in Eastern Uganda in parts of Tororo, Busia, Bigiri districts and Western Kenya. In Uganda the community are small, amounting to 421,106 according to National Housing Population Census conducted in 2014. The Basamia people are predominantly agriculturalists and grow crops like cassava, rice, millet, beans, fish and potatoes.

== Culture ==
The Basamia people speak the language Olusamia, and are in the clan leadership system and are led by their king "Omwenengo'. Traditionally, marriage is done from other clans and not from the same clan for a biological parent. In the past, men wore goat skin as clothes and the women used leaves as clothes. Traditional burial ceremonies are held and accompanied by music with instruments like Adungu, bow-harp.

== See also ==
- Acholi People
- Lango
- Karamojong
