= Hororo people =

Tribe in South-Western Uganda

Related ethnic groups
- Banyankole, banyoro

The Hororo also known as Bahororo are a Bantu-speaking and Hima ethnic group native to southwestern Uganda, primarily inhibiting the Rujumbura and rubaho countiees of Rukungiri District as well as parts of Ntungamo District in the former Kigezi sub region in Uganda. and are related to the Banyankole, Banyoro, Batooro, Songora and Tutsi peoples respectively. Rujumbura was ruled by the BeeneKirenzi sub-clan with Omukama Karegyesa as their last king. The Bahororo speak a dialect of Nkore-Kiga, Ruhororo. They are subdivided into clans that are similar to those of the kingdom of Ankole. Unlike Ankole, which was ruled by the Hinda clan, Mpororo was led by the Bashambo clan.In 1905, they were described by a British officer as a "quiet, inoffensive people" who owned cattle.

== Rise of the Hororo State ==
The lands that constituted Mpororo were formerly part of the Chwezi empire until its dissolution in the sixteenth century.

Before the middle of the seventeenth century, the area that became Mpororo - the land of the Hororo - was known as Ndorwa and formed the southern province of the kingdom of Busongora. During the reign of Queen Kitami cya Nyawera of Busongora, a fugitive Rwandan prince named Kamali Murari sought asylum at the queen's court. Murari, a claimant to the Rwandan throne, had been ousted by his brother Kigeri II Nyamuheshera. At that time, Rwanda and Songora shared a common border, and Murari and his followers escaped into Busongora.

Murari arrived in Busongora and was directed to Queen Kitami's palace. The Songora queen was renowned for her fearlessness, exceptional beauty, and intelligence. Murari resided at Kitami's court, and the queen eventually married the Rwandan prince. They had a son named Kahaya Rutindangyezi. Meanwhile, King Kigeri II of Rwanda, to the south, sought to invade Busongora to capture Murari. The commander of the Rwandan troops was Bihira-bya-Muhuruzi, a member of the AbaKono sub-clan of the Abega clan.

The war between Busongora and Rwanda was brutal and prolonged. The capital city of Busongora, named Bunyampaka (known as "Ibumpaka" to the Rwandans), located in what is now Queen Elizabeth National Park, was sacked and burned by Rwandan troops. In retaliation, the Songora armies occupied the region around Lake Muhazi in central Rwanda (present-day Gahini) and captured many Rwandans. During the conflict, Queen Kitami cya Nyawera was stung by a bee and succumbed to toxic shock shortly after around 1625. Her death left Basongora generals bewildered, leading them to conclude that the war was futile. The Rwandan Royals also desired an end to the conflict due to numerous misfortunes during their king's reign. Ncenderi, Queen of Rwanda and wife to King Kigeri II, took her own life before his reign ended.

To resolve the conflict, the Rwandans and the Basongora negotiated a truce to prevent future wars. The terms of peace stipulated that the region of southern Busongora, known as Ndorwa, would become a buffer state with Prince Murari (brother to Kigeri of Rwanda and consort to Kitami of Busongora) as its inaugural king. This new buffer state was named Mpororo, likely meaning "place of vengeance" due to the significant bloodshed it had witnessed. The Gisaka region in Rwanda, which had been occupied by the Songora, remained autonomous and was later reintegrated into Rwanda during the reign of Kigeri IV Rwabugiri in the 1880s.

Before departing from the newly formed Mpororo, the Basongora Royals entrusted Murorwa, one of the Songora royal drums, to the new King Murari. This event marked the establishment of Mpororo as an independent state. When Kahaya Rutindangyezi succeeded Murari on the throne, Mpororo flourished under his rule, earning a distinguished reputation that endures to this day. The inhabitants of Mpororo came to be known as "BaHororo," meaning "people of Mpororo."

At its peak, the kingdom of Mpororo encompassed all of Kigezi (except the modern Bafumbira saza and a portion of Kinkizi), the Ankole sazas of Kajara, Igara, Sheema, and Rwampara (excluding the low ground south of the Rwizi River), sections of northeastern Burundi, northwestern Tanzania, eastern Congo, and the entirety of the northern region of Rwanda.

== Decline of Mpororo ==
The state of Mpororo endured for approximately 125 years, until around 1775, when it fragmented into six independent states led by the six sons of Kahaya: Nshenyi state under King Rukaari, Rujumbura state under King Kirenzi, Igara state under King Mafunda, Kajara state under King Kihondwa, Bwera state, and Rukiga state. Despite this dissolution, the inhabitants of the new states continued to primarily identify themselves as Bahororo, a tradition that persists to this day.

Mpororo Kingdom retained greater renown than its successor states. In 1887, Henry Morton Stanley was denied passage through Mpororo. Stanley's assessment of the Bahororo was unfavorable: "I had to negotiate with the people of Mpororo who were savage and had never before encountered strangers, besides being embroiled in perpetual blood feuds." Accompanying Stanley was Sheikh Ahmed bin Ibrahim, a Muslim trader, who remarked, "The Bahororo are a formidable people but covetous, malignant, treacherous, and utterly untrustworthy. They have consistently prohibited Arabs from trading in their territory. Although there has been an abundance of ivory there for the past eight years, traders such as Khamis Bin Abdullah, Tippu Tip, Sayid bin Habib, and myself have repeatedly attempted to gain entry, yet none of us has succeeded. You cannot traverse Mpororo, for its inhabitants are like Shaitan (Satanic), and the Bahororo are wicked. Something occurred when the Wangwana (bad people) ventured there, and the locals never tolerate outsiders; they are full of deceit, indeed."

The accounts of Stanley and the Arab slave traders tarnished the reputation of the Bahororo, as well as the Banyarwanda and the Basongora. When Captain Frederick Lugard and others ventured to conquer Central Africa, they harbored fear of both Hororo and Songora communities, and they treated them harshly. In 1910, British colonial forces forcibly annexed all the states of Mpororo and incorporated them into the neighboring kingdom of Nkore. Throughout its history, Nkore had only comprised three provinces, namely the modern counties of Isingiro, Nyabushozi, and Kashaari. With the addition of old Mpororo, Nkore more than doubled in size. Nevertheless, many individuals still proudly identify themselves as Bahororo today, despite efforts to assimilate them into the Banyankore identity.

== Modern Era ==
The memory of Kitami-kya-Nyawera inspired the powerful politico-religious movement known as Nyabingi in the early 20th century, which played a significant role in the struggle against colonial occupation. Spirit mediums, who served as priestesses of the Nyabingyi religion, claimed that Kitami had also been a priestess of Nyabingyi, the deity, and that they could convey messages from Nyabingyi and Kitami when in a possession trance.

During the 18th century, the hereditary Nyabingyi priestesses often spoke while in trance, usually veiled or hidden behind curtains. In the late 1800s, Queen Muhumuza of the Rwanda Kingdom emerged as the leading Nyabingyi spirit medium. After her husband, King Kigeri IV Rwabugiri, died, Queen Muhumuza was exiled from Rwanda. She embarked on a quest to locate the lost drum Murorwa and initiated a resistance movement aimed at unifying Central Africa. During the struggle against colonial occupation, she effectively became the ruler of all the Mpororo states, leading what became known as the Nyabingyi resistance movement. Although centered in Mpororo, the Nyabingi Resistance was active in Central and East Africa, particularly in Uganda, Rwanda, Burundi, Tanzania, and Eastern Congo, between 1850 and 1950.

By the 1890s, Priestess-Queen Muhumuza was one of the most feared anti-colonial resistance leaders in Africa. As late as 1891, Emin Pasha wrote: "The Queen of Mpororo had never been seen by anyone, not even her subjects. All they ever knew of her was the voice heard behind the curtain of a bark cloth. Such dramatic practices earned her the reputation of a powerful sorceress capable of both bewitching and benefiting people throughout Karagwe and Mpororo."

Muhumuza orchestrated armed resistance against German, British, and French colonial forces. She was captured in 1913 and detained by the British in Kampala, Uganda, where she died in prison in 1944. Marcus Garvey eulogized her upon learning of her death, while European colonial officials described her as "an extraordinary character."

The followers of Muhumuza are also responsible for preserving the memory of the Songora queen Kitami and conserving and transmitting much of the history of ancient Busongora and Mpororo. Possessions by Nyabinghi continue to occur, primarily affecting women, especially in the southwestern region of Uganda and the northwestern region of Tanzania.

The Jamaica-based Niyabinghi Theocracy Government, a Mansion of Rastafari, was named after the resistance movement and Nyabingi spiritual belief system led by Muhumuza. Her followers always pay tribute to Kitami-kya-Nyawera as one of the ancient Nyabingi priesthood. The Igongo Museum in Uganda (Mbarara) features a special display dedicated to Kitami-kya-Nyawera, popular among Rastafarians and others associated with the Nyabingyi Movement.

Today, the Hororo continue to advocate for formal acknowledgment from the Nkore Cultural Institution and the Ugandan Government of the injustices done to Mpororo, and demand its reconstitution by the colonial authorities, but have received no formal response. Many opponents of re-establishing the expanded Nkore Kingdom are Bahororo, who believe that reinstating Nkore on territory rightfully belonging to the states of Mpororo is unjust.

== Language ==
The Bahororo people speak a dialect of Nkore-Kiga called Ruhororo and are divided into clans, most of which are shared with both the Nkole and Kiga ethnic groups. The Bahororo language is similar to Runyankole, spoken by the Banyankole.
