= Bagwe =

The Bagwe people are a Bantu ethnolinguistic group that live mostly in Southeastern Uganda (particularly Samia-Bugwe County in Busia District) with a few scattered in Western Kenya. They are composed of several clans and their ancient economic activities include fishing (owunaabi) in Lake Victoria and other rivers, crop farming (owulimi), and animal farming (owutuki). They were recognised in the 1995 Ugandan Constitution as one of the 56 identified tribes of Uganda. At the time of the 2014 Census, 99,884 respondents identified as Bagwe.

The Bagwe speak Lugwe.

== Political setup ==
The political setup of Bagwe was loose and segmentary. They did not have chieftainships. Every village was under the jurisdiction of an elder called the Nalundiho who was also a rainmaker. He administered law and order and he was responsible for settlement of disputes and he was the most influential person in the village and his position was hereditary

== Marriage ==
Marriage has of recent changed but during the old times, if the parents of the boy and the girl were friendly, they could arrange the marriage without the boy and the girl being actively involved but cases of this nature were rare. The usual method was that the boy would seduce the girl first and the girl was not to show concrete response even though she was interested. Thereafter the boy would come with a spear and plant it in front of the hut of the girl's mother and if the girl had consented to marriage, she would remove the spear and take it inside the mother's hut. thereafter bride wealth negotiations would start. There was no fixed bride wealth for each girl one was charged according to their status. Upon payment of the bride wealth further arrangements were made to take the girl to her husband.
