= Samia tribe =

Kenyan and Ugandan tribe

Samia
Total population
- 794,000

Regions with significant populations
- Kenya and Uganda
- Kenya: 84,828
- Uganda: 421,106

Languages
- Samia

Religion
- Christianity, Traditional African religions, Islam

Related ethnic groups
- Other Bantu people

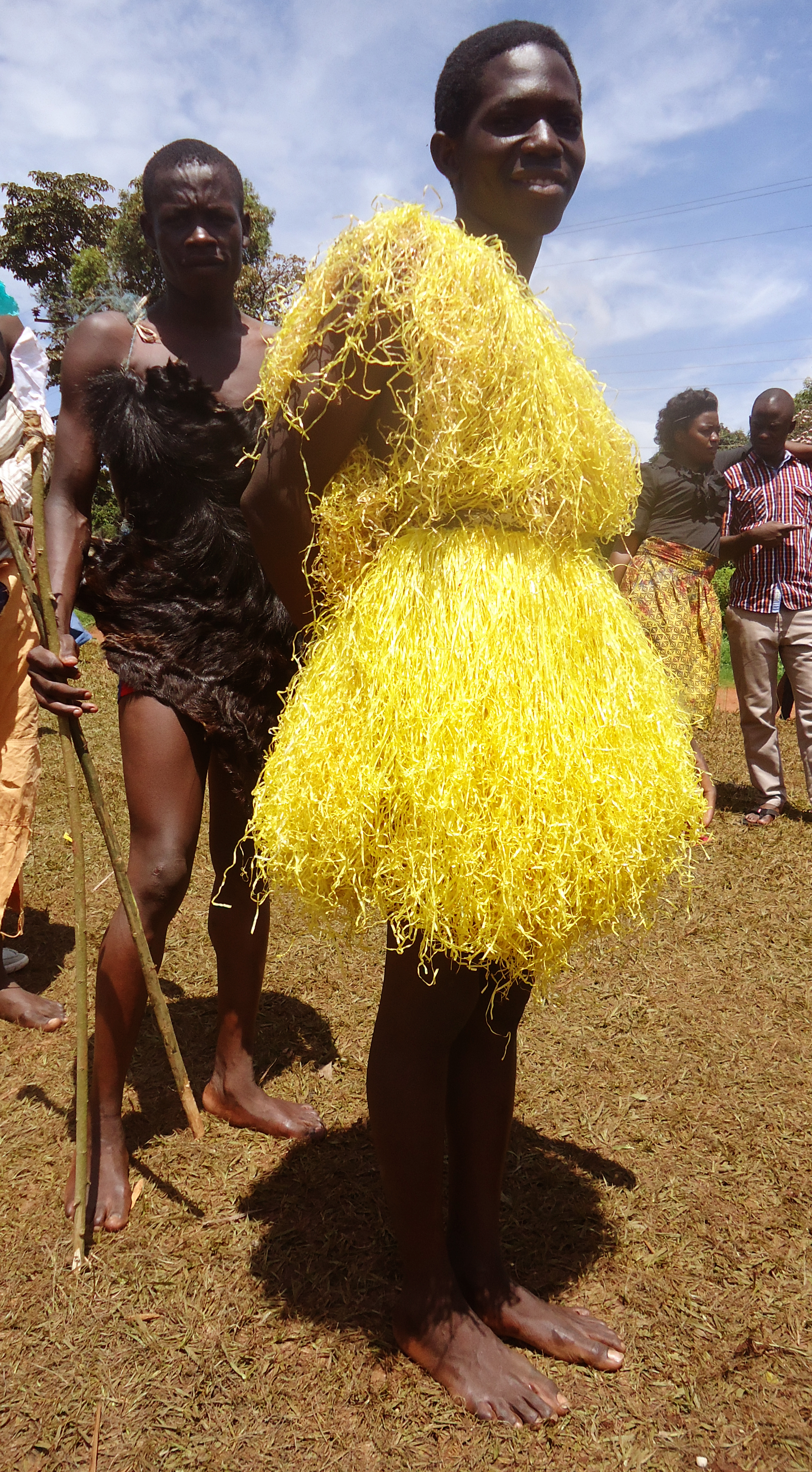
Samia Bagwe of Uganda

Samia speaking people live in Western Kenya and Eastern Uganda. They are composed of several clans and their ancient economic activities include fishing in Lake Victoria and other rivers such as River Sio, crop farming (obulimi), and animal farming (obutuki). The Samia speaking people, as widely known by other tribes, predominantly live in Busia districts (Both in Kenya and Uganda) and speak a dialect similar to the Luhya tribe in Kenya. However, on the Ugandan side there is a slight variation in the dialect spoken by the Samia of Southern Busia on the fringe of Lake Victoria and those of North Busia district closer to Tororo District. The former speak Olusamia while the latter speak Olugwe. The two dialects are difficult to differentiate by non Samia speaking people but easily discernible by the natives. and in Uganda mainly found inbusia and Namayingo district.

== Culture and Music ==
Samia speaking people love music which is played in their various ceremonies, which include marriage (Obugole/ Obweya), funeral (amasika), veneration of ancestors (ebikuda mukutu and Enga'nyo), and wrestling (amalengo). Their musical instruments include: (a) A large violin-like wooden instrument called Adungu (b) A drum called Engalabe, covered at one end with the skin of a monitor lizard (c) A flute called Erere and (d) An instrument called Sikudi. The major traditional dances are owaro, ekworo, eboodi and esikudi. The eboodi and ekworo are love dances. Owaro and esikudi are performed when people are happy.

== Marriage Culture ==
In the early days, marriage would be arranged without active involvement of the boy and girl. Traditionally, the boy had to first seduce the girl, the boy would arrive with a spear and place it in front of the girl's mother's hut. If the girl had agreed to marry, she would take the spear and return it to her mother's hut. Following that, bride price talks would begin.

== Clans ==
Samia speaking people have a number of clans, each person belongs to the father's clan. You can not marry from your clan or your mother's clan.

== History ==
Years before modern government, Samia people used to live in villages called Engongo which are separated by valleys and within Engongo they had Engoba. Engoba is many; one is called Olukoba. One needed a ladder-like contraption to access or leave Olukoba but the Olukoba also had specific gates. Up to today, the daily lives of Samia people are dictated by customs and traditions. For instance, a woman who loses her husband should be remarried to a brother of the deceased so that should this widow wish to bear more children, they should resemble their kin. Their diet consists of cassava bread made of sorghum or millet, often mixed with fermented cassava also called obusuma. Sometimes white stiff porridge made out of maize flour added. The food is eaten with vegetables, meat, or chicken. The Samia also largely consume gruel, rice and bananas. Samia speaking people are known to be very brilliant people due to frequent consumption of fresh fish. Samia has produced a significant number of scholars.In fact non Samia speaking people often refer to them as "obusuma ne'ngeni bicha speed" meaning brown stiff porridge and fish roll down the throat very fast.

== Notable people ==
- W.W.W. Awori - Pioneer Kenyan journalist, trade unionist, Kenya African Union leader, and Member of Legislative Council of Kenya (Legco) from 1952 to 1956
- Moody Awori - Former Kenyan Vice President, veteran politician and business magnate.
- Aggrey Soryoyi Awori - Politician, former International athlete, former parliamentarian and cabinet minister.
- Sam Odaka – Former Foreign Minister of Uganda (1964–1971)
- Benjamin Josses Odoki - Former Chief Justice of the Republic of Uganda, from 2001 until 2013.
- Justice James Ogoola - Lawyer, Judge and Poet. Principal Judge of the High Court of Uganda and a Justice of the COMESA Court of Justice in Lusaka, Zambia.
- Barbara Nekesa Oundo The former State Minister for Karamoja Affairs in the Ugandan Cabinet.
- Professor Fred Wabwire-Mangen - Professor of Epidemiology, Makerere University School of Public Health.
- Geoffrey Masiga Ogambo - Chief Technology Officer at Bank of England, Leeds Beckett University, University of Liverpool.
- Prof. Julia Ojiambo -Kenyan politician, academic, researcher, and gender activist. She was the first female Kenyan to study at Harvard University.

== See also ==
- Basamia
- Busia, Uganda
- Busia, Kenya
- Busia District, Uganda

== Relevant literature ==
- Oscar, Akumu Brendah. "Imagery and Disability in Samia Proverbs." BA thesis, Makerere University, 2020.
