= Culture of Uganda =

Culture of Uganda is made up of a diverse range of ethnic groups. Lake Kyoga forms the northern boundary for the Bantu-speaking people, who dominate much of East, Central, and Southern Africa. In Uganda, they include the Baganda and several other tribes

The Baganda are the largest single ethnic group in Uganda. They occupy the central part of Uganda which was formerly the Buganda Province. They are found in the present districts of Kampala, Mpigi, Mukono, Masaka, Kalangala, Kiboga, Rakai, Mubende, Luwero, Wakiso, Ssembabule, and Buikwe. They are a Bantu-speaking people and their language is called Luganda.

In the north, the Lango and the Acholi peoples predominate, who speak Nilotic languages. To the east are the Iteso and Karamojong, who speak a Nilotic language, whereas the Gishu are part of the Bantu and live mainly on the slopes of Mt. Elgon. They speak Lumasaba, which is closely related to the Luhya of Kenya. A few Pygmies live isolated in the rainforests of western Uganda.

== Traditional culture ==
Ugandan traditions include folk music, dances, foods, clothing, and building styles, among others.

In Northern Uganda, particularly the Lango sub-region, a healing ritual called child-cleansing ceremony is conducted to restore the lost manhood of a child. In this ceremony, both the child and mother spend 3 days in a grass thatched house. Traditionally, they are tasked to drink sweetened millet porridge. As the 3 days elapse, both the mother and child sit at the door entrance with a company of paternal brothers. This is believed to restore the lost manhood after the healing ritual is performed. The Acholi people and Lango people have their unique dances, such as Larakaraka and Bwola for Acholi, and Okeme/Abuda for Lango people.

In Western Uganda, there is the Empaako naming system where the indigenous communities of Batooro, Banyoro, Batuku, Banyabindi, and Batagwenda identify traditional names that match different seasons, times, and clans, among others. Other traditions include dances, namely Entogoro and Ekitagururo, performed by traditional dancers.

Eastern Uganda has traditional practices such as the Imbalu circumcision ceremony from the Gisu people in the Mbale District, and Karamoja herders who traditionally move to many places in search of water and pasture for their animals. Central Uganda is known for traditional dances such as Bakisimba, Nankasa, and Muwogola, which are inspired by their daily life.

== Religion ==
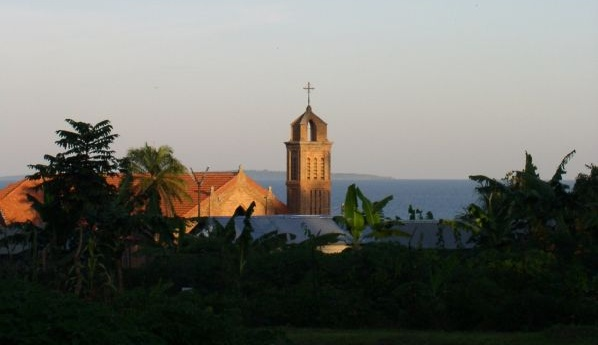
A church in Entebbe, Uganda

Christians make up 85.2 percent of Uganda's population. There were sizeable numbers of Sikhs and Hindus in the country until Asians were expelled in 1972 by Idi Amin, following an alleged dream, although many are now returning following an invitation from President Yoweri Museveni. Muslims make up 12 percent of Uganda's population.

== Sport ==
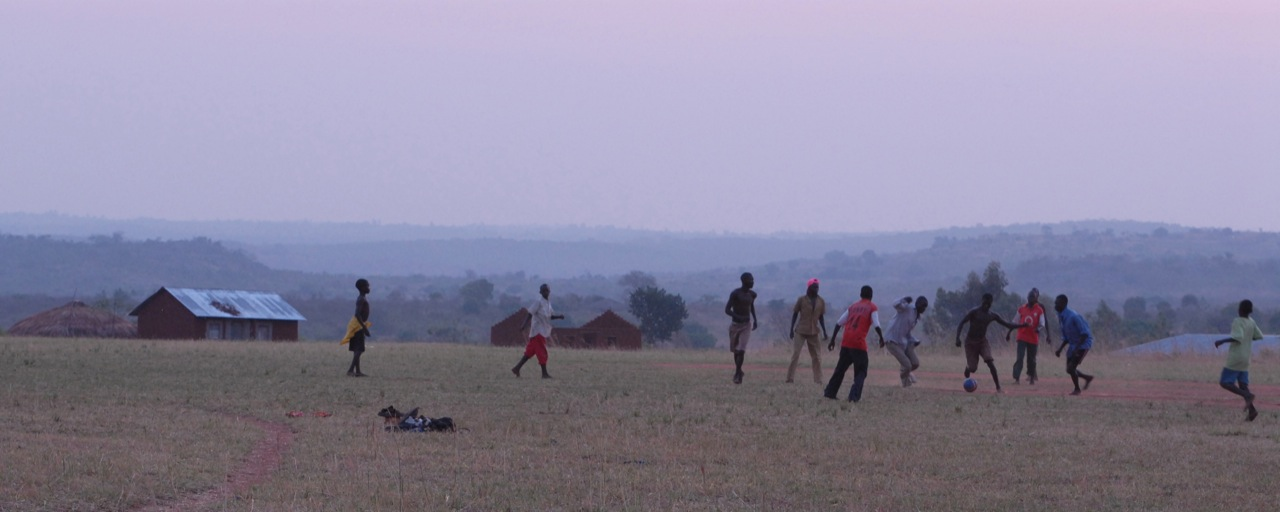
Young boys playing a casual game of football (soccer) in Arua District

Football is the national sport in Uganda. The Uganda national football team, nicknamed "The Cranes" is controlled by the Federation of Uganda Football Associations. They have never qualified for the FIFA World Cup finals. Their best finish in the African Cup of Nations was second in 1978.

In cricket, Uganda was part of the East Africa team that qualified for the Cricket World Cup in 1975.

There is also a national basketball league played by some professional players as well as college students and a few high school students. Uganda hosted a regional tournament in 2006, which its national team, nicknamed The Silverbacks, won.

Rugby union is also a growing sport in Uganda, and the Uganda national rugby union team has been growing stronger as evidenced by more frequent victories and close games against African powerhouses like Namibia and Morocco.

At multi-sport events, Uganda has enjoyed most of its success in athletics and boxing. Uganda has won seven medals at the Olympics and 39 at the Commonwealth Games, all in these two sports. Some of Uganda's most notable athletes include John Akii-Bua, who won Uganda's first Olympic gold in the 400 metres hurdles at the 1972 Munich Olympics, and Davis Kamoga, a bronze medalist in the 400 metres and the first Ugandan to win a medal at the IAAF World Championships in Athletics (winning a silver at the 1997 World Championships in Athens). Moses Ndiema Kipsiro was the bronze medalist in the 5,000 metres at the 2007 World Championships in Osaka, and Stephen Kiprotich was the winner of the marathon at the 2012 London Olympics and the 2013 World Championships. Notable among female athletes include Dorcus Inzikuru, who was the first Ugandan to win a gold at the World Athletics Championships when she won the 3,000 metres steeplechase at the 2005 World Championships in Helsinki, before adding a gold at the 2006 Commonwealth Games in Melbourne.

Ayub Kalule was one of Uganda's most successful boxers, winning golds in the light welterweight category at the 1974 World Amateur Boxing Championships and the lightweight division at the 1974 Commonwealth Games before turning professional and becoming World Boxing Association light-middleweight world champion in 1979.

As of April 2021, Uganda has been one of four African members of the rapidly growing international federation for lacrosse. For the first time, Uganda will feature a national team at the 2022 Under-19 World Lacrosse Championships.

== Language ==
Uganda is ethnologically diverse, with at least 40 languages in usage. Luganda is the most common language. English and Swahili are the official languages of Uganda, even though English is more popular. Swahili, the East African lingua franca, is not widespread as a language though it was made an official national language in September 2005. Luganda, a language widespread in central Uganda, has been the official local language but education is conducted in English.

== Media ==
Uganda has a diverse broadcasting sector, with 283 radio stations and 65 television networks, the majority of which are privately owned. Pay television services are widely accessible across the country. The print media market is dominated by the state-owned New Vision and the privately-owned Daily Monitor. By December 2021, Uganda had an estimated 18.5 million internet users, representing approximately 39% of the population. Among social media platforms, Facebook was the most widely used, followed by Twitter and TikTok.

== Clothing ==
In Uganda, the kanzu is the national dress of men in the country. Women from central and eastern Uganda wear a dress with a sash tied around the waist and large exaggerated shoulders called a gomesi. Women from the west and north-west drape a long cloth around their waists and shoulders called suuka. Women from the south-west wear a long baggy skirt and tie a short matching cloth across their shoulders c known as omushanana. Women also wear a floor-length dress called a busuti, which was introduced by the 19th-century missionaries.

== See also ==
- Uganda National Cultural Centre
- Uganda National Contemporary Ballet
