= Gisu people =

Tribe of people in eastern Uganda

The Gisu people, or Bamasaba people of Elgon, are a Bantu tribe and Bantu-speaking ethnic group of the Masaba people in eastern Uganda, closely related to the Bukusu people of Kenya. Bamasaba live mainly in the Mbale District of Uganda on the slopes of Mount Elgon. The Bagisu are estimated to be about 1,646,904 people making up 4.9% of the total population according to the 2014 National Census of Uganda.

== Religion ==
The majority of the Bagisu people are Christians mainly Anglican (Church of Uganda) estimated at 45.7% while a significant percentage are Roman Catholic estimated at 29.1%. Around 14% of the Bagisu people follow Islam according to the 2002 Census of Uganda and 5.3% are Pentecostal.

== Ancestor ==
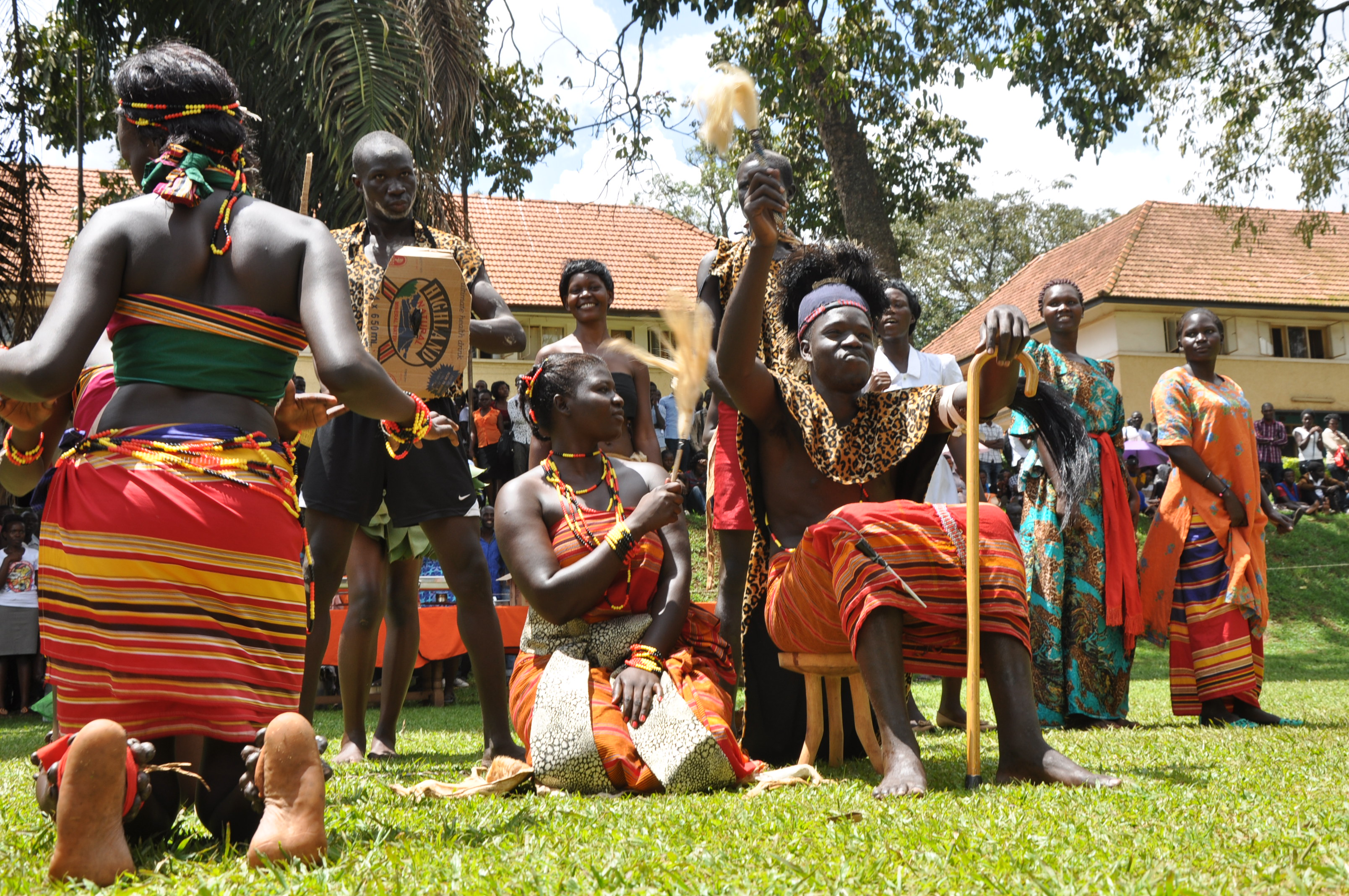
Culture in bugishu.

The Masaba, Bukusu and Luhya people believed that their ancestors were Mundu and Sera. The people of Ethiopia and the Ethiopian Highlands have no name for Kundu, except that it is a mountain peak in Oromiya.

The Bamasaba ancestor, Masaba migrated from the Ethiopian Mountains traveling via Lake Turkana to Sironko and settled around Bududa where he fell in love with a Maasai girl who was known as Nabarwa. The family of Nabarwa demanded that in order for Masaba to marry their daughter he had to undergo their rite of circumcision. He agreed to do so.

== Culture ==
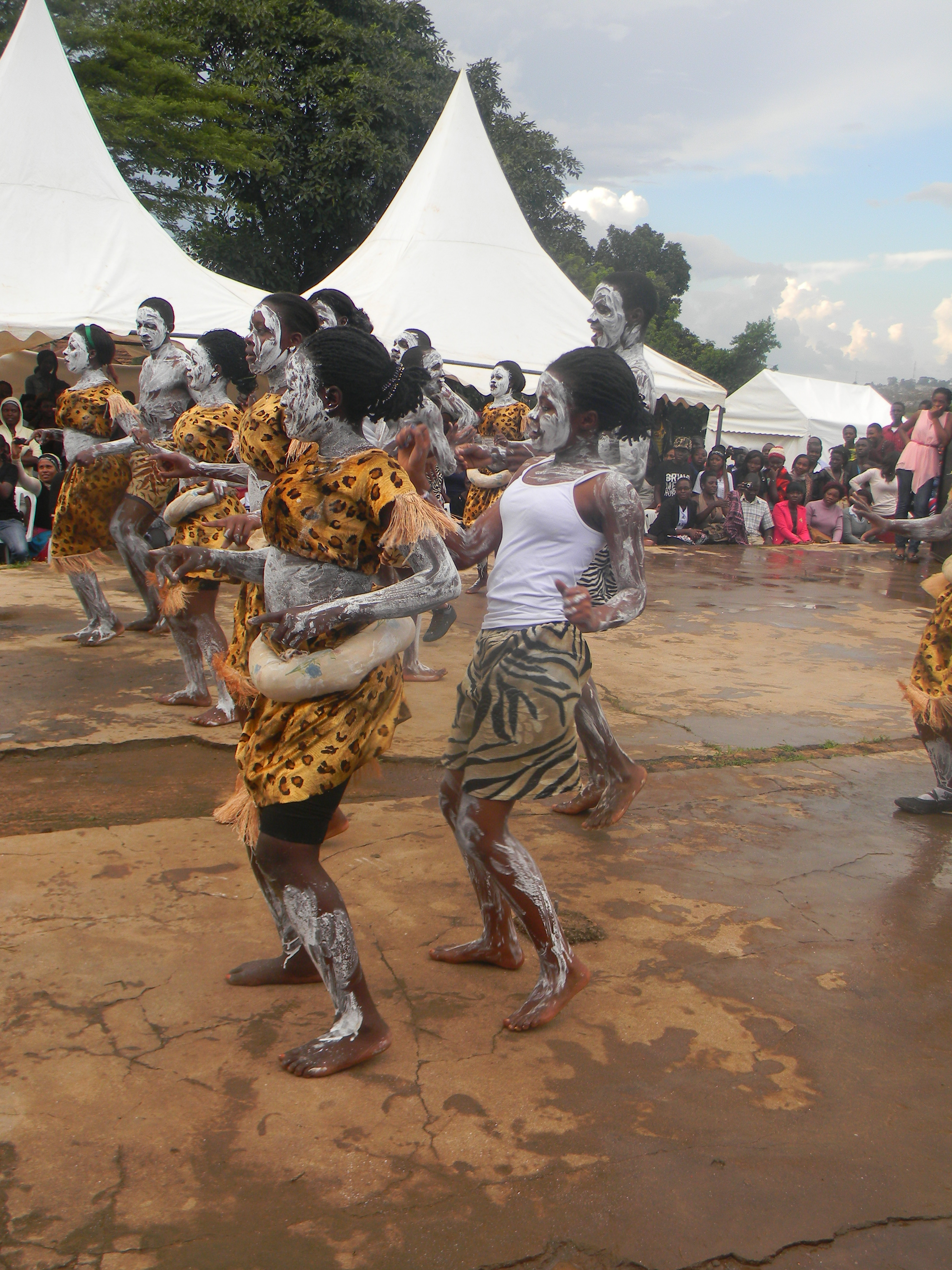
Imbalu Dance

Circumcision in Africa is an old culture as practiced by the Bamasaaba in Eastern Uganda.The culture of circumcision was adopted by the Bamasaba from their in-laws the Maasai people. The men among the Bagisu tribe undergo initiation ceremonies known as Imbalu. The initiation ceremonies among the Bamasaaba are held every two years during August.

Banana is the staple food for the Gisu people. It's commonly referred to as "Matoke"

The Bamasaaba ancestors lived on bamboo shoots also known as Malewa in the Lumasaba language. These bamboo shoots are collected from bamboo trees on top of Mt. Elgon.

== Origin of the name Bagisu ==
Masaba's first son with Nabarwa was Mwambu who was nicknamed Nkisu by his Maasai uncles who had stolen his father's cows from him. Masaba failed to pronounce the nickname of Nkisu meaning a bull in Maasai language, given to his son his uncle and he pronounced it as Mugisu. The name Bagisu originated from the nickname Nkisu given to Mwambu by Masaba's Maasai Brother-in-law.

The Bamasaba speak a dialect of the Lumasaba language called Lumasaba, which is fully understandable by other dialects, and is also understood by the Bukusu. The Bamasaba share a lot of things with the Bukusu from Kenya. They share culture and according to the Bukusu the Bamasaba are their real brothers its only the border that divides them.

== Economy ==
The Bagisu communities are agriculturalists. Those who stay as far as 5000 ft above sea-level grow Arabica coffee, the biggest portion of it being sold to Bugisu Co-operative Union. They also grow other crops like cotton and tobacco, maize, beans, millet, sorghum, yams and cassava.

== See also ==
- Buganda People
- Ugandan Folklore
- Samia Tribe
- Babwisi People
