= Ugandan folklore =

Legends and folklore of Ugandan culture

Ugandan folklore includes traditional folktales, myths, legends, proverbs, songs and oral narratives of people of Uganda. These traditions have historically been transmitted orally from one generation to another and serve as a means of preserving cultural values, social norms, and collective memory. Folktales in Uganda often function as moral instruction, entertainment, and historical explanation, reinforcing discipline, communal responsibility, and accepted behavior within society.

== Forms and themes ==
Ugandan folktales commonly feature animals, legendary heroes, spirit, and mythical ancestors. Recurrent themes include wisdom versus foolishness, greed and generosity, obedience, bravery, and the consequences of moral failure. Trickster figures- often represented by the hare or rabbit- are widespread across many regions and ethnic groups.

Storytelling traditionally took place in domestic and communal settings, especially in the evenings, and was often accompanied by song, riddles, and audience participation. Elders played a central role as custodians of oral knowledge.

== Northern Uganda ==
Folktales from Northern Uganda include the story of Mighty Angwech, the Hare's Marriage, and The Shoe-Maker and the Monkey. They were studied by Kyambogo University and Makerere University. The Acholi tribe refer to their folktales as ododo pa Acholi meaning "Folktales of the Acholi" and some of them include many stories about rabbits and hares as tricksters in the wild.

== Eastern Uganda ==
The Teso community of Eastern Uganda, offers the great folktale of Oduk the conqueror. He led the Teso people from South Sudan to Eastern Uganda and ultimately to western Kenya. In the Gisu tribe, male circumcision, known as Imbalu, is a famous annual ceremony that retells the Bugisu story of boys transiting into men.

== Western Uganda ==
In Western Uganda, folktales can be found among the Bunyoro, Banyankole, Bachiga, and other groups. In Bunyoro an epic story is told of the Batembuzi who founded Bunyoro Kingdom. Their stories tell of mythical gods and the heavens and the underworld. Heaven was led by Ruhanga and the underworld or earth ruled by an outcast thrown from heaven.

== Central Uganda ==
In Buganda, Nambi and Kintu folktales tell a story that long ago, Kintu was the only man in Uganda. He had one cow. Up in the sky existed a kingdom whose king was named Ggulu. He had handsome sons and beautiful daughters who loved watching the rainbow. One day, Ggulu's sons called their sister Nambi to join them to play at the foot of a rainbow. They did not know that the land the rainbow touched was Uganda. They became frightened, as Nambi and her brothers had never seen a man. Nambi with her kind heart promised to come back and marry Kintu so he would never be lonely again. Other Buganda folktales include the story of Walukaga the blacksmith, Mpobe the hunter, and Kasanke the little red bird. Folktales in Buganda are also about hares, leopards, rabbits and other animals that live in the wild and one of the famous folk stories is about wango and wakayima. Wango is a leopard while wakayima is a rabbit.

== See also ==
- Buganda Kingdom
- Busoga Kingdom
- Bunyoro Kingdom
- Ebyevugo, Ugandan folk poetry
- Oral literature in Africa
