= East Nyanza languages =

Subgroup of Great Lakes Bantu languages spoken in Kenya and Tanzania

East Nyanza
- Gusii-Kuria
- Geographic distribution: Mara Region, Migori County, Kisii County, Nyamira County, Mfangano Island
- Linguistic classification: Niger–Congo?: Atlantic–Congo; Volta-Congo; Benue–Congo; Bantoid; Southern Bantoid; Bantu; Northeast Bantu; Great Lakes Bantu; East Nyanza
- Proto-language: Proto-East Nyanza
- Subdivisions: Nyanza Mara; Suguti

Language codes
- Glottolog: east2750

The East Nyanza languages form a subgroup of the Great Lakes Bantu languages spoken in Kenya and Tanzania.

== History ==
Proto-East Nyanza speakers migrated into the Mara region in 100 AD, with much of their population likely settling within the Tarime highlands (which has wetter lands than the comparatively dier lakeshore). They subsequently split into the Suguti and Mara branches around 300 AD. As the early East Nyanza speakers migrated into the Mara Region (and later, western kenya), they encountered Southern Cushitic and Kuliak peoples, whom they absorbed and were culturally influenced by. They were later also influenced by a now-extinct branch of southern Nilotic people who were migrating into the Mara Region from the north at the same time as the East Nyanza peoples. The early East Nyanza peoples were matrilineal, which aided them in absorbing Kuliak, Cushitic, and Nilotic males into their societies.

== Classification ==
The East Nyanza languages are classified within the Glottolog database as follows:

- Nyanza Mara
  - North Mara
    - Gusii
    - Kuriaic
      - Kuria
      - Suba-Simbiti
    - Suba
    - Kabwa
  - South Mara
    - Southwest Mara
      - Ikizu
      - Zanaki
    - Western Serengeti
      - Ngoreme
    - Southeast Mara
      - Ikoma
      - Isenyi
- Suguti
  - Jita
  - Kara
  - Kwaya
