= Jita language =

Bantu language of Tanzania

Jita
- Ecijita
- Native to: Tanzania
- Region: Mara Region
- Ethnicity: Jita people
- Native speakers: 210,000 (2005)
- Language family: Niger–Congo?: Atlantic–Congo; Volta-Congo; Benue–Congo; Bantoid; Southern Bantoid; Bantu; Northeast Bantu; Great Lakes Bantu; East Nyanza; Suguti; Jita

Language codes
- ISO 639-3: jit
- Glottolog: jita1239
- Guthrie code: JE.25

Jita is a Bantu language of Tanzania, spoken on the southeastern shore of Lake Victoria/Nyanza and on the island of Ukerewe.

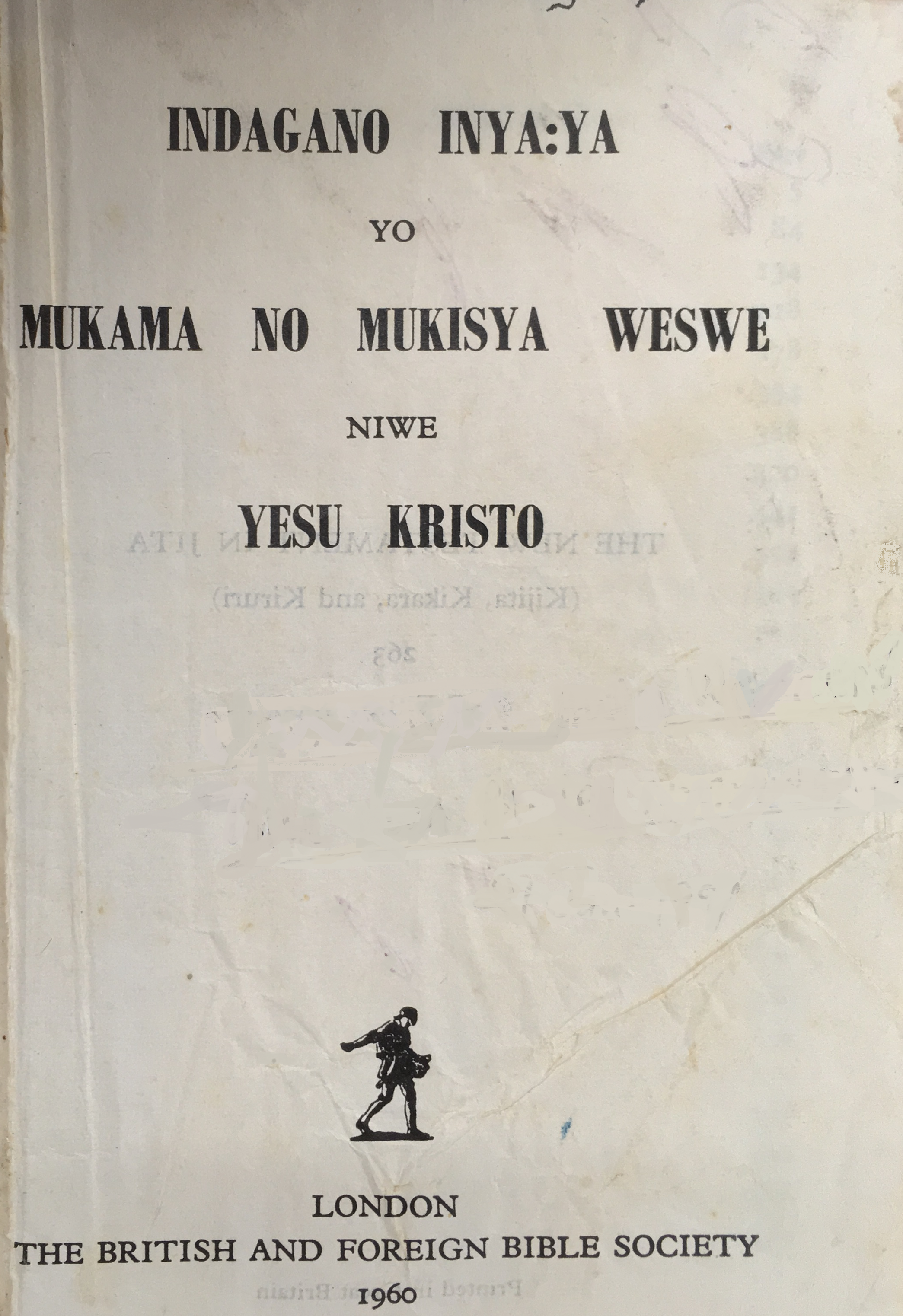
Title page of the New Testament in Jita

== Classification ==
Guthrie (1967) classifies Jita in Bantu Zone E, Group 20 because, like other languages in this zone, it has double prefixes (preprefixes or augments) on nouns, an “unparalleled wealth” of verb tenses and true negative tenses with a distinctive negative prefix. More recent work (Bastin 2003, Maho 2009) classifies Jita as part of an Interlacustrine Bantu group (Zone J). More specifically, Jita is a member of the Suguti Bantu group, with the Guthrie code JE.25.

Kwaya (KYA, JE.251); Kara (REG), Regi/Leki (both JE.252); and Ruri/Rori (JE.253) are closely related to Jita. While Glottolog considers Ruri a dialect of Kwaya, Massamba's (1977) comparative study of Jita, Ruri and Kwaya suggests that Ruri is quite similar to Jita, while both Jita and Ruri show a number of differences from Kwaya.

== Phonology ==
=== Vowels and vowel processes ===
Jita has the five vowel system - plus length contrasts - illustrated in the table below.

	Front	Central	Back
Close	i iː		u uː
Mid	e eː		o oː
Open		a aː	

As in many Bantu languages, vowel height harmony (VHH) affects the quality of vowels in verbal suffixes, so that only the root-initial vowel of verbs contrasts for vowel quality. Vowel length is neutralized following consonant-glide sequences and preceding NC sequences, where only long vowels are found due to a process known in the Bantu literature as compensatory lengthening. (See Downing 1990, 1996 and the Jita Orthography Statement for illustrations of these processes from Jita; see Hyman 1999 and Odden 2015 for general discussions of these phonological processes.)

=== Consonants ===
Jita has the following IPA consonant phonemes.

		Labial	Labio-velar	Alveolar	Alveo-palatal	Velar	Guttural
Plosive	voiceless	p		t		k	
Plosive	voiced			d		g	
Fricative	voiceless		f	s	ʃ		h
Fricative	voiced	β	v	z			
Affricate	voiceless				t͡ʃ		
Affricate	voiced				d͡ʒ		
Nasal		m		n	ɲ	ŋ	
Liquid				l/r			
Trill							
Approximant		w			j		

The Jita Orthography Statement notes that [p] and [d] are mostly found in borrowed words. There seems to be considerable variation in the realization of the liquid phoneme. Downing (1990, 1996) says that the liquid is variably realized as [l] or [r] and chooses [l] as the phoneme, since it seems to be the variant most consistently attested in root (morpheme) initial position. Van der Weken (2002) notes variation between [l] and a retroflex lateral [ɭ], rather than a trill [r]. The Jita Orthography Statement lists [r] as the phoneme and doesn't mention variation in its realization.

=== Tone ===
Like most Bantu languages, Jita is tonal. A detailed analysis of the Jita tone system has been made by Downing (1990), (1996), and (2014), as well as Rolle (2018). Work like Downing (2011), Kisseberth & Odden (2003), Marlo (2013) and Philippson (1991) put Jita tonal processes in a wider Bantu perspective.

== Nominal morphology ==
Nouns in Jita, which also include infinitives, have the following morphological structure: Preprefix (PP) - Class Agreement Prefix (CP) - Stem. Below is a chart of nominal agreement prefixes. IPA symbols are used for all charts in this article; see the Jita Orthography Statement for Jita orthography equivalents. N indicates a nasal that assimilates in place to a following consonant.

Class	PP	CP	Example	Gloss
1	o	mu	omu nu	person
2	a	βa	aβa nu	people
3	o	mu	omu fuko	bag
4	e	mi	emi fuko	bags
5	(e)	li	li nad͡ʒi	coconut palm
6	a	ma	ama nad͡ʒi	coconut palms
7	e	t͡ʃi	et͡ʃi nu	thing
8	e	βi	eβi nu	things
9		i:(N)	i:m bed͡ʒo	adze
10		ji:(N)	ji:m bed͡ʒo	adzes
11	o	lu	olu góje	eyelash (Cl. 10 plural)
12	a	ka	aka góje	string
13	o	tu	otu góje	strings
14	o	βu	oβu néne	bigness (no pl.)
15	o	ku	oku té:ka	to cook (no pl.)
15a	o	ku	oku βóko	arm (Cl. 6 plural)

In Class 5, the preprefix only occurs with some vowel-initial or monosyllabic roots. In all other classes, the preprefix occurs with all nouns. Nominal modifiers follow the noun. The preprefix and class agreement prefixes also occur on adjectives. Non-adjectival modifiers take a different set of agreement prefixes, which lack preprefixes:

Class	CP2
1	u
2	βa
3	gu
4	d͡ʒi
5	li
6	ga
7	t͡ʃi
8	βi
9	i
10	d͡ʒi
11	lu
12	ka
13	tu
14	βu
15, 15a	ku

== Verbal morphology ==
The morphological structure for verbs is:

Subject Prefix (SP) - (Negative Prefix-) Tense/ Aspect Marker (TAM) - (Object Prefixes (OP)-) Root - (Derivational Suffixes-) (Tense Marker (TAM)-) Final Vowel.

The Root plus following suffixes comprises the Stem; this grouping plus object prefixes comprises the Macro-Stem. Jita is one of the Bantu languages which allow two object prefixes to occur before the Stem.

=== Subject and object prefixes ===
Subject and object prefixes for verbs are identical to the CP2 prefixes listed above, except for Class 1. The first, second and third (Classes 1 and 2) person singular and plural subject and object agreement prefixes for verbs are as follows:

SP / OP (singular)		SP / OP (plural)	
I	ni ~ N / N	we	t͡ʃi / t͡ʃi
you	u / ku	you pl.	mu / βa
s/he (Cl.1)	a / mu	they (Cl.2)	βa / βa
-self (reflexive OP, singular and plural)			i

=== Derivational suffixes (extensions) ===
Derivational suffixes in Jita, as in other Bantu languages, change the argument structure of the verb to express grammatical notions such as causative, benefactive, locative, reciprocal, reversive and passive. Below are listed some common derivational verbal suffixes (extensions) in Jita. Some extensions have two contextually determined forms due to vowel height harmony, mentioned above.

-(is)j- / -(es)j-	causative
-ir- / -er-	Benefactive; locative
-an-	reciprocal
-urur- / -oror-	reversive

The extended form of some Jita infinitives is found in the table below (oku- is the infinitive prefix; an acute accent on a vowel indicates High tone):

oku-má:m-a	to sleep; lie down
oku-ma:m-ír-a	to sleep somewhere (applied)
oku-má:m-j-a	to make lie down (causative)
oku-βwí:r-a	to tell
oku-βwi:r-án-a	to tell each other (reciprocal)
oku-d͡ʒí:ng-a	to wind
oku-d͡ʒi:ng-úrur-a	to unwind (reversive)

=== TAMs ===
As noted by Guthrie (1967), Jita has a "wealth" of verb tense/aspect/mood (TAM) paradigms. Downing (1990, 1996, 2014) and Odom & Robinson (2016) provide comprehensive lists of the paradigms. Note, however, that Odom & Robinson (2016) do not mark tone, even though the melodic tone patterns assigned to each pattern are a crucial part of the expression of TAM. (See Odden & Bickmore 2014 for an overview of the properties of Bantu melodic tone.) Below is the Appendix from Downing (2014), providing an overview of the melodic tone patterns assigned to frequently used TAMs in Jita. In addition to TAM, the negative prefix, as well as relative verb forms, can determine the melodic tone pattern.

Inflection	Tone pattern
Infinitive	non-melodic
Distant Past I	melodic – penult H
Negative	melodic – penult H
Relative	melodic – penult H
Distant Past II	melodic – final H
Negative	melodic – final H
Relative	melodic – final H
Perfective	non-melodic
Yesterday Past	non-melodic
Negative	non-melodic
Relative	non-melodic
Today Past	non-melodic
Negative	non-melodic
Relative	melodic – final H
Present Continuous	melodic – ‘chaotic’
Negative	non-melodic
Distant Future	melodic – final H
Negative	non-melodic
Relative	melodic – final H
Imperative	melodic – ‘chaotic’
Subjunctive	melodic – ‘chaotic’

When no consistent melodic tone pattern could be determined for a paradigm, Downing labeled the pattern "chaotic." Rolle (2018) develops an analysis of Jita melodic tone which finds a pattern even in the "chaotic" paradigms.

== Bibliography ==
=== Works on Jita/Sources of information for this article ===
- Bastin, Yvonne. 2003. The Interlacustrine zone (Zone J). In D. Nurse & G. Philippson (eds.), The Bantu Languages, 501-528. London: Routledge.
- Downing, Laura J. (1990) Problems in Jita Tonology. University of Illinois PhD thesis.
- Downing, Laura J. (1996) The Tonal Phonology of Jita. Lincom Europa.
- Downing, Laura J. (2014) "Melodic verb tone patterns in Jita". In Africana Linguistica 20:101-119, January 2014. DOI: https://doi.org/10.3406/aflin.2014.1026
- Jita Orthography Statement: Approved orthography edition. 2016. SIL International.
- Kagaya, Ryohei. 2005. A Jita vocabulary. (Asian and African Lexicon, 47.) Tokyo: Institute for the Study of Languages and Cultures of Asia and Africa (ILCAA), Tokyo University of Foreign Studies. xxi+482pp.
- Massamba, David Phineas Bhukanda. 1977. A comparative study of the ruri, jita and kwaya "languages" of the eastern shores of Lake Nyanza (Victoria). MA thesis, University of Dar es Salaam; iii+138pp.
- Odom, Shannon Ronit and Robinson, Holly. 2016. The Grammar Basics of Jita. Dallas, Texas: SIL International. 24pp.
- Philippson, Gérard. 1991. Tons et Accent dans les Langues Bantu d'Afrique Orientale: Étude Comparative Typologique et Diachronique. Doctoral dissertation, Université de Paris V - René Descartes.
- van der Veken, A. 2002. Aspects of the Linguistic Study of Jita. Licentiaat thesis, University of Ghent.

=== Other works cited ===
- Downing, L. J. 2011. Bantu Tone. In van Oostendorp, M., C. J. Ewen, E. Hume & K. Rice (eds.), The Blackwell Companion to Phonology, Chapter 14. Cambridge; Oxford: Blackwell.
- Guthrie, Malcolm. 1967. The classification of the Bantu languages. London: Dawsons of Pall Mall for the International African Institute.
- Hyman, Larry M. 1999. The historical interpretation of vowel harmony in Bantu. In Jean-Marie Hombert & Larry M. Hyman (eds.), Bantu Historical Linguistics: Theoretical and Empirical Perspectives. Stanford, CA: CSLI, 235-295.
- Kisseberth, C. W. & D. Odden. 2003. Tone. In D. Nurse & G. Philippson (eds.), The Bantu Languages, 59-70. London: Routledge.
- Marlo Michael R. 2013. Verb tone in Bantu languages: micro‑typological patterns and research methods. Africana Linguistica 19, 137-234. DOI : https://doi.org/10.3406/aflin.2013.1020
- Odden, David. 2015. Bantu Phonology. Oxford Handbooks online. DOI: https://doi.org/10.1093/oxfordhb/9780199935345.013.59
- Odden, David & Lee Bickmore. 2014. Melodic tone in Bantu: overview. Africana Linguistica 20, 3-13. DOI : https://doi.org/10.3406/aflin.2014.1021
