= Al Mtenje =

Malawian academic

Alfred D. Mtenje
- Born: September 17, 1953 (age 73); Ntcheu district, Malawi
- Education: M.A. Southern Illinois University PhD, University College London
- Occupations: Linguist, Professor
- Employer: University of Malawi
- Known for: Work on the prosody of Malawian Bantu languages
- Title: Full Professor of African Languages and Linguistics
- Spouse: Alice Mtenje
- Children: 2
- Awards: Commonwealth Fellowship (1983) African Research Fellowship (1990) Fulbright Fellowship (1993)

Alfred (“Al”) D. Mtenje (born 17 September 1953 in Ntcheu district, Malawi) is a professor of Linguistics at the University of Malawi. He is known for his work on the prosody of Malawian Bantu languages, as well as for his work in support of language policies promoting the native languages of Malawi.

== Education and career ==
Mtenje completed his M.A. in 1980 at Southern Illinois University with a thesis titled Aspects of Chichewa derivational phonology and syllable structure. He went on to obtain his PhD in linguistics in 1986 at the University College London. His PhD thesis, which was supervised by Neil Smith, was titled Issues in the Non-linear Phonology of Chichewa.

Mtenje joined the University of Malawi as a Lecturer in 1980 and rose to the rank of a full professor of African languages and Linguistics in 2000. Mtenje has held a number of administrative positions in the University of Malawi, including: director of the Consultancy Bureau (2009–2012); pro vice-chancellor (academic affairs), (2013–2020); acting vice-chancellor (2020–2022).

== Contributions to Malawian linguistics ==
Mtenje is internationally known for his research and publications in the field of linguistics. His research has focused on the phonology of the Bantu languages of Malawi, particularly prosodic aspects including the interface between tone on the one hand and morphology and syntax on the other. In 2017, he co-authored, with Laura Downing, a book titled The Phonology of Chichewa, which was published by Oxford University Press.

Mtenje served as the founding director of the Centre for Language Studies (CLS) at the University of Malawi from 1996 to 2008. Notable projects initiated during his time as director include, firstly, publication of a Linguistic Atlas for Malawi. Prior to 2006, Malawi did not have official data on the number of languages spoken in the country and their geographical distribution. As a research center responsible for language issues, the CLS got a grant in 2006 from the Open Society Initiative for Southern Africa (OSISA) to carry out a language survey for Malawi and produce a language atlas. The project culminated in the production of the first linguistic atlas for the country in which detailed technical information about the language situation in Malawi was provided. This included data on the total number of languages (and their dialects), their geographical spread, demographic details about their speakers and recommendations to the Malawi government about the implication of the language information for education policy in Malawi.

Secondly, he initiated the development and publication of monolingual dictionaries for Malawian languages. Before the Centre for Language Studies was established, Malawi had a number of bilingual dictionaries (especially English-Chichewa dictionaries; e.g. Paas). When the CLS was launched in 1996, one of its major projects was the production of monolingual dictionaries as a resource. Data was collected and in the early 2000s monolingual dictionaries for Ciyao and Chichewa were produced. These have proved to be a useful resource for people working on the two languages as well as for teaching in the main native languages of Malawi, a language policy reform that Mtenje (2011) advocates for.

== Academic honors and awards ==
Al Mtenje has received several academic awards and honors the most notable being:

- 1983: Commonwealth Fellowship to support his PhD studies at UCL
- 1990: African research fellowship – Ohio State University, Columbus, Ohio, US
- 1993: Fulbright Fellowship – University of California, Berkeley, US

In addition, Mtenje has presented numerous invited academic talks as a visiting research fellow and professor of linguistics at universities in Europe, US, Asia as well as Africa.

== Personal life ==
He is married to Alice Mtenje and together they have two daughters, Atikonda and Asante, both of whom are university academics.

== Selected publications ==
- Laura J. Downing and Al Mtenje. 2017. The Phonology of Chichewa. Phonology of the World's Languages. Oxford: Oxford University Press. ISBN 978-0-19-872474-2 doi:10.1093/oso/9780198724742.001.0001
- Downing, Laura J. and Mtenje, Al. 2011. Prosodic phrasing of Chichewa relative clauses. JALL 32, 65–112. doi:10.1515/jall.2011.003
- Larry Hyman and Al Mtenje. 1999. Prosodic morphology and tone: the case of Chichewa. In Harry van der Hulst, René Kager & Wim Zonneveld, eds., The prosody-morphology interface, 90–133. Cambridge: Cambridge University Press.
- Charles Kisseberth and Al Mtenje. 2022. Melodic High Tones in Emihavani. In Stellenbosch Papers in Linguistics Plus, vol 62, no. 2. DOI: doi:10.5842/62-2-893
- Mtenje, Al D. 1985. Arguments for an autosegmental analysis of Chichewa vowel harmony. Lingua 66, 21–52. doi:10.1016/S0024-3841(85)90248-7
- Mtenje, Al D. 1987. Tone shift principles in the Chichewa verb: A Case for a Tone Lexicon. Lingua 72, 169–209. doi:10.1016/0024-3841(87)90033-7
- Mtenje, Al. 1993. Verb structure and tone in Ciyao. In Topics in African Linguistics: Papers from the XXI Annual Conference on African Linguistics, University of Georgia, April 1990. Edited by Salikoko S. Mufwene and Lioba Moshi. Amsterdam: John Benjamins. doi:10.1075/cilt.100.15mte
- Mtenje, Al. 2006. Tone in Cindali. Special Issue, Language in Mind: A Tribute to Neil Smith On the Occasion of his Retirement. Lingua 116, 1495–1506. doi:10.1016/j.lingua.2005.06.015
- Mtenje, Al. 2007. On recent trends in phonology: vowel sequences in Bantu languages. SOAS Working Papers in Linguistics 15, 33–48.
- Mtenje, Al. 2011. Developing a language policy in an African country: The case of Malawi. Globalisation and African Languages: Risks and Benefits, edited by Katrin Bromber and Birgit Smieja, Berlin, New York: De Gruyter Mouton, pp. 147–162. doi:10.1515/9783110891614.147
