= Address Malata =

Malawian nursing academic

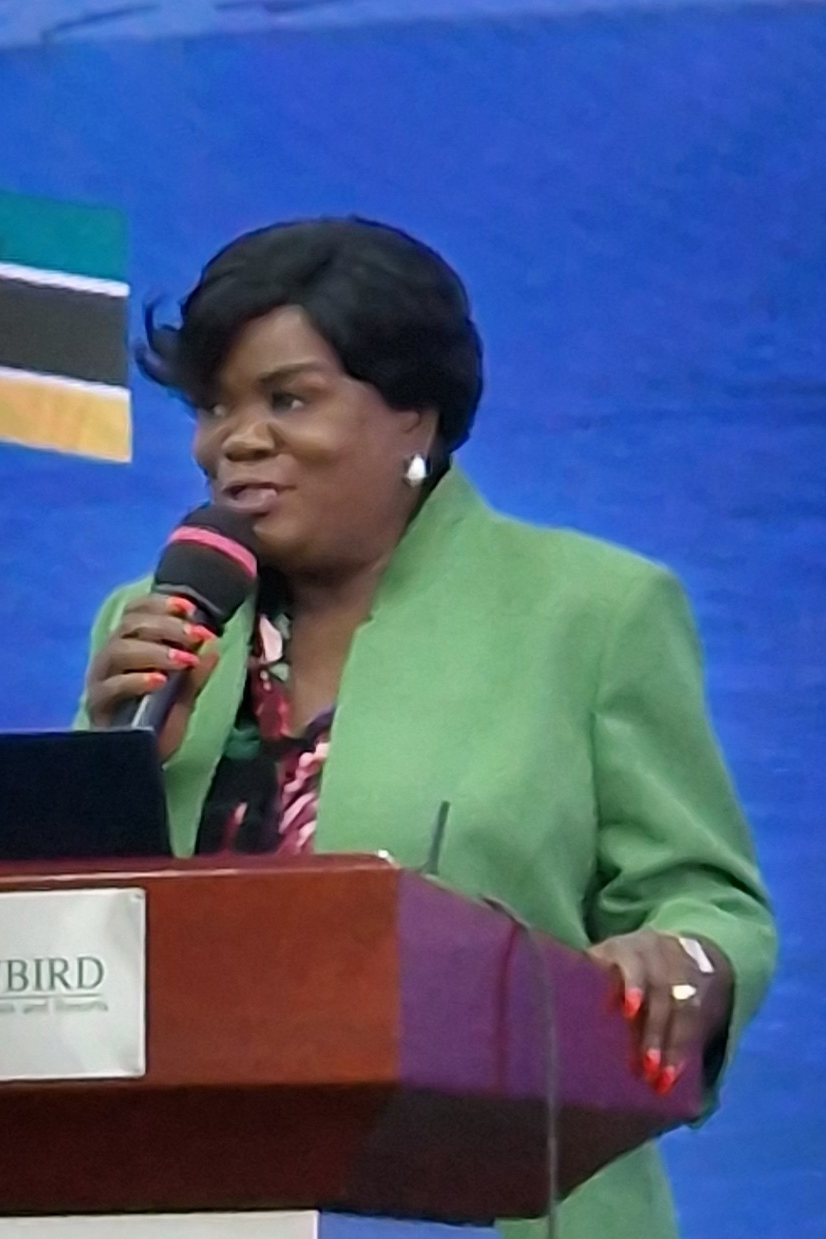
- Malata in 2026
- Education: University of Malawi (Bsc); Edith Cowan University (Masters, PhD); University of Oslo (Honorary degree)
- Occupations: nurse, midwife and educator
- Employer(s): Kamuzu College of Nursing; Malawi University of Science and Technology (MUST); Mulungushi University
- Organization(s): International Confederation of Midwives; Merck for Mothers Initiative; Africa Honor Society of Nursing of Sigma Theta Tau International
- Children: 2
- Honours: Fellow of the American Academy of Nursing

Address Mauakowa Malata is a Malawian nurse, midwife, professor and educator. She was the Vice-Chancellor at the Malawi University of Science and Technology (MUST) until 2026 and the former Principal of Kamuzu College of Nursing. She was Vice President of the International Confederation of Midwives. She is the former President of Africa Honor Society of Nursing of Sigma Theta Tau International.

== Biography ==
Malata achieved her bachelor of science degree in nursing with distinction from the University of Malawi in 1995. She studied her masters degree and PhD at the Edith Cowan University in Perth, Western Australia. In 2018, Malata was awarded a Doctor Honoris Causa by the University of Oslo in Norway.

Malata is former vice president of the International Confederation of Midwives and former president of the Africa Honor Society of Nursing of Sigma Theta Tau International. She is also a member of the board of the Partnership for Maternal, Newborn and Child Health (PMNCH), Advisory Committee for the Merck for Mothers Initiative (2021), LACTATE Study Oversight Committee (2021) and the Governing Council of Mulungushi University in Zambia (2020).

While Principal of Kamuzu College of Nursing (formerly a college of the University of Malawi and now part of the Kamuzu University of Health Sciences), Malata led the college to become a World Health Organization collaborating centre for interprofessional education and leadership.

Malata was appointed as Vice-Chancellor at the Malawi University of Science and Technology (MUST) in 2019, becoming Malawai's first female university Vice Chancellor.

In 2024, Malata was nominated as a candidate for the Commissioner of Education, Science and Technology and Innovation position at the African Union Commission and was named a recipient of the 2024-2025 University of California, San Francisco (UCSF) Presidential Chair Award. She also attended the University of Strathclyde event "Our Shared Future - Developing Our Joint Pathway for Impactful Partnerships in Africa."

The new chancellor Mwapatsa Mipando receiving a symbolic key from Address Malata

In 2026, Address Malata, announced her retirement as vice-chancellor. One of her mentees, Atikonda Mtenje-Mkochi, published a tribute to her and the "9 lessons" that underlined her approach to leadership.

Her research contributions have been published in journals including Journal of Advanced Nursing, Reproductive Health, Health Affairs, Malawi Medical Journal, Nurse Education Today, and International Scholarly Research Notices.
