= Introducing Phonology =

Introducing Phonology may refer to:

- Introducing Phonology (Odden book), 2005 book by David Odden
- Introducing Phonology (Hawkins book), 1984 book by Peter Hawkins
