= Rusinga (Cultural) Festival =

Annual two-day celebration of the culture of the Abasuba people of Kenya

Rusinga Cultural Festival is an annual two-day celebration of the culture of the Abasuba people of Kenya. It is held on the last Thursday and Friday before Christmas on Rusinga Island. The festival was founded by Anne Eboso and administered through Chula Cultural Foundation.

The Rusinga Cultural Festival is the largest festival preserving the culture of the Abasuba who are mainly found on the Rusinga Island and Mfangano Island on Lake Victoria on the Kenyan portion of the Lake. Abasuba culture is under pressure from the neighboring Luo community due to assimilation and intermarriage. Suba language has been listed by the United Nations Educational Scientific and cultural Organization (UNESCO) in its Atlas of the World's Languages in Danger as one of the thirteen endangered languages in Kenya where it is classified as vulnerable.

The festival addresses societal ills within the Abasuba community such as the sex-for-fish practice that impacts negatively on efforts to curb the spread of HIV.

The Rusinga Cultural Festival is a mixed-type of festival; it incorporates more than one item of celebration with music, cultural sporting activities, art and food from traditional Suba cuisine being the main features of the Rusinga Cultural Festival. There is additionally a street procession that is used to invite residents of the Rusinga Island to the festival grounds.

The festival producer is a long-standing promoter of culture, education and literacy through book-reading. The Rusinga Festival utilizes a boat-library that also serves the purpose of providing a safe space for discussion of various sensitive issues affecting the Abasuba.

== Music ==
The Rusinga Cultural Festival has performances of both traditional and contemporary music. Traditional music is in form of performances by cultural troupes and Abasuba traditional music groups. The traditional music is performed in Subanese language. The highlights of the cultural performances are at the festival’s sporting events. Just before the boat races, performers and festival attendees move from the grounds of the festival and move to the waters of Lake Victoria, accompanied by traditional music and dances.

== Culture ==
Abasuba culture is the primary celebration of the Rusinga Cultural Festival. Different facets of Abasuba culture are on display at the festival. Artifacts in clay-work, woodwork and daily Abasuba life showcasing the Abasuba culture are displayed at the festival. The music, cuisine, sporting events and any other event happening at the festival are primarily aimed at promoting and preserving Abasuba culture.

== Food ==
Food at the Rusinga Cultural Festival includes traditional delicacies and modern foods. Some of the Traditional foods available at the festival takes long periods to prepare and is available only for a short period – usually the first day of the festival. Delicacies available include traditionally prepared meats, vegetables and other dishes.

== Sports ==
Popular sports at the Rusinga Cultural Festival are Wrestling(Eminyiika), Oluko/Oruko(Ajua) Tug-of-War and Boat Racing. These sports are not unique to the Abasuba community alone, but they are the most powerful and valued sports for the Abasuba. Boats in the races at the Rusinga Cultural Festival are human powered boats. They are manned by teams of seven people; six to paddle and one team leader who doubles as the helmsman. There is a separate category for women at the boat race. Sports in Suba community and at the festival pull large crowds. There are other smaller competitive sports at the festival including board games.

== Tourism ==
Tours around the Suba islands of Lake Victoria – Rusinga Island, Takawiri Island and Mfangano Island are available to attendees of the Rusinga cultural Festival. The festival organizers often work with tours and travel companies to facilitate these tours. The festival has opened up the Western Kenya tourism circuit and exposed it to both domestic and international tourists.

== Community involvement ==
Abasuba community members are highly engaged in preparation, management and running of the Rusinga Cultural Festival. This results in very high attendance of the festival. There is no age restriction to attend the festival, and it is open entry. Issues affecting the Abasuba are addressed at the festival. The festival provides a forum for discussing health & sanitation, HIV, banking, social security protection and other things affecting the Abasuba community.

== Organizing the festival ==
=== Financing ===
The Rusinga Cultural Festival is financed by partners and sponsors. Relevant government departments, private sector and various embassies are the major partners of the Rusinga Cultural festival. Partnerships and Sponsorships are both financial and in-kind. Administration of the festival is through the Chula Cultural Foundation.

=== Communication ===
The Rusinga Cultural Festival utilizes both mainstream and new media. Access to mainstream media in the form of broadcast media is provided through partnerships with media houses. Digital media is a major communication channel for the festival. The 2016 festival utilized the services of Mutahi Muriithi as its digital media and publicity consultant. Rusinga Cultural Festival has used effective and timely communication to support its growth and ensure it meets its objectives of preserving Abasuba culture and promoting literacy in the Abasuba community.
