= Kyaghala =

Kyaghala is a village in North Kivu, the Democratic Republic of the Congo. On February 16, 2017, the Maï-Maï Mazembe (members of the Nande, Hunde and Kobo tribes) killed 25 Hutu villagers who had been forced to migrate to this area after their land in Rwanda had become too expensive due to speculation.
