= Gungu people =

Bagungu
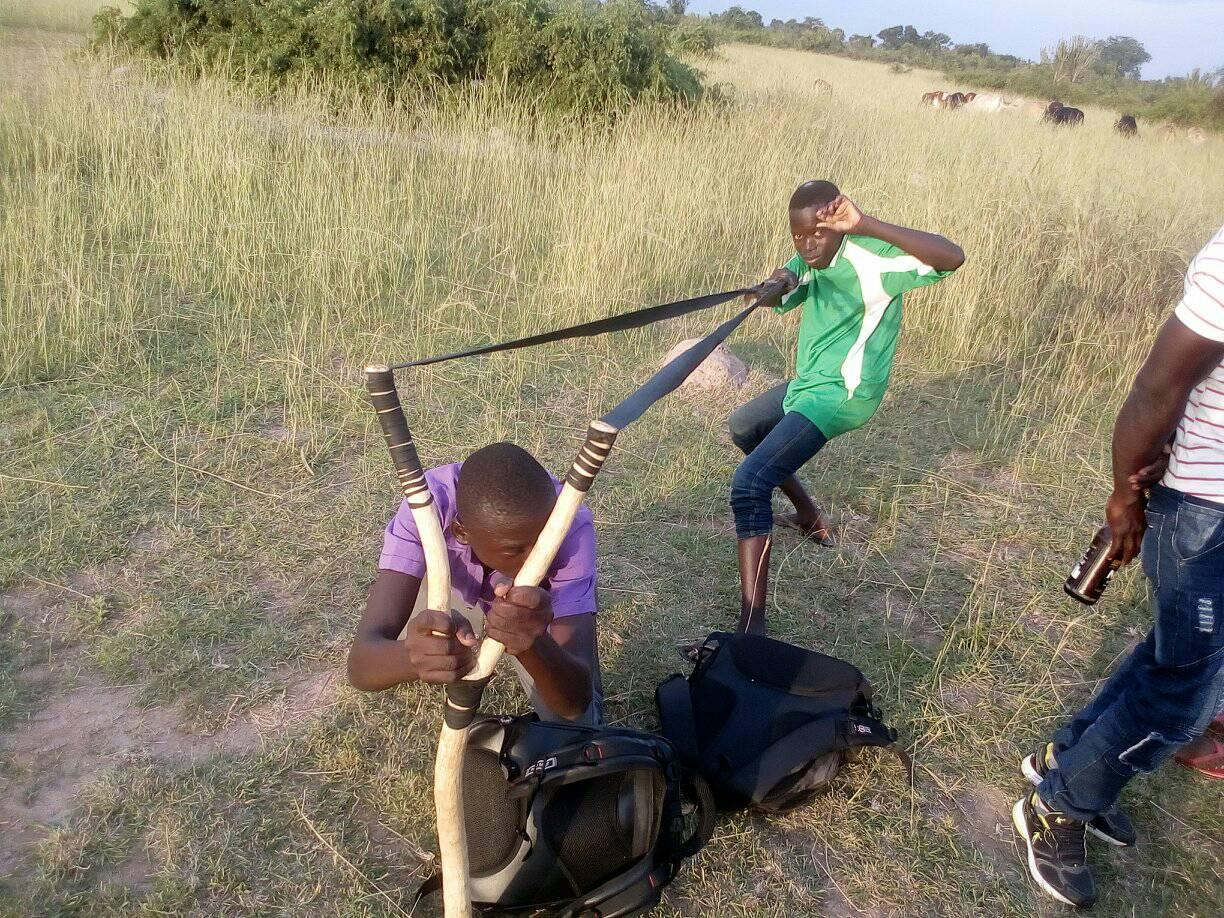
- A picture of children playing with catapult. Photo by Kiiza Wilson

Total population
- 83,986

Regions with significant populations
- Uganda

Languages
- Gungu

Religion
- Christianity, Traditional African religions

Related ethnic groups
- Other great Lakes Bantu peoples

Gungu
- Person: MuGungu
- People: BaGungu
- Language: LuGungu
- Country: BuGungu

The Gungu or (Bagungu) are a Bantu ethnic group native to Uganda. They live on the northeastern shores of Lake Albert along the Rift Valley. They speak a distinct dialect of the Runyoro language called Lugungu. They are traditionally fishermen, pastoralists, and subsistence farmers. Historically, this is because their cradle land Buliisa district, has ecosystems that can allow them to practice all these three economic activities.

== Religion ==
The Church of Uganda or Anglican Church and the Roman Catholic Churches are the two largest denominations among the Bagungu. According to the 2002 Census of Uganda, 54.6% of Bagungu are Anglican (Church of Uganda) and 31% are Roman Catholic. A minority of Bagungu at 6.3% follow other religions.

== Overview ==
The Bagungu have historically lived in the Buliisa District of western Uganda. Traditionally, they were migrated from Gungu land in the DRC congo, They came along the lake Edward and crossed through the Lake Albert and settle in Buliisa District near Murchison falls National Park, which come from the word Kulisia mean grazing, predominantly fishermen and pastoralists but this changed over the years, with the decline of fish stock in Lake Albert and competition for grazing resources, resulting in more cultivation. They have tried to secede from the Bunyoro kingdom in recent times.

== Oil Fields ==
In 2006, large quantities of oil and gas were discovered in the Albertine Western Region of Uganda. The oil fields are being developed on the ancestral lands of the Bagungu and Alur.
