= Mount Soklo =

Geographic feature of Mfangano Island

Mount Soklo is a mountain on Mfangano Island (Kenya), in Lake Victoria, Africa. The mountain has a river, as well as a spring that provides drinking water. It has a generally cool climate.

Mountain residents are mostly farmers who plant cassava, sugarcane, maize, and other staple crops. There is a fishing industry on the mountain, and burning of charcoal is also prevalent.
