= NYG =

NYG or nyg may refer to:

- New York Giants, an American football team
- New York Guard, a US state defense force
- Marine Corps Air Facility Quantico , a military airfield in Virginia, US (IATA and FAA LID:NYG)
- Nyindu language, spoken in DR Congo (ISO 639-3:nyg)
