= Lisa Cheng =

Lisa Cheng may refer to:

- Lisa Cheng (bodybuilder)
- Lisa Cheng (linguist)
