= SXB =

SXB or sxb may refer to:

- SXB, the IATA code for Strasbourg Airport, France
- sxb, the ISO 639-3 code for Suba language, Kenya
