= HKE =

HKE or hke may refer to:

- HK Express (ICAO: HKE), a Hong Kong-based low-cost airline fully owned by Cathay Pacific Airways
- Hunde language (ISO 639-3: HKE), a Great Lakes Bantu language spoken in the Democratic Republic of the Congo
