= Kabwa people =

Ethnic group from Mara Region of Tanzania

The Kabwa are a Bantu ethnolinguistic group based in Mara Region in north-central Tanzania.

See related article about the Kabwa language
