= Nyamgodho Son of Ombare =

Nyamgodho Son of Ombare is a folk legend of the Luo peoples of Kenya. It is also known as Nyamgondho Wuod Ombare, Nyamgondho Kombare, and Nyamgontho.

The legend of Nyamgondho centers around a poor fisherman from Kamuela in Tanzania who came to sojourn in Kachwodho clan in Nyandiwa next to the present Nyandiwa fishing beach on the Suba mainland in Kenya. Nyamgodho's name was Julu son of Ombare and the grandson of Omae. The full myth has been told in the seminal anthology of Luo oral literature "Keep My Words" by Onyango-Ogutu and Nashley Mbayah.

== Story ==
Nyamgondho son of Ombare was a very poor man who earned a living by fishing on Lake Victoria. He barely had anything to eat or clothes to wear, and, every evening, his underprivileged conditions forced him to walk long distances looking for a place among kind neighbors to help him with a place to sleep. One morning, Nyamgondho woke up so hungry that he thought he was going to die of hunger. Thus, he went to the lake at least with a hope of getting his daily bread, as he was fishing he cast his net and upon pulling it in, he saw an ugly woman. Nyamgondho wanted to throw her back into the water, but the ugly woman persuaded him to pull her out and live with her as his wife. She promised to make him wealthy, on the condition that he never reveals to anyone where she was found.

The lady of the lake was hardworking and Nyamgondho became very rich, acquiring many cattle and several other wives. However, he suddenly grew proud and arrogant and one day he came home drunk; each wife, who had her own house, refused to let him in. Even the lady of the lake refused to let him in. Nyamgondho shouted "What? Even you, ugly creature whom I found in the lake, you won’t open the door for me?" Enraged, the lady of the lake replied "What have you said? What was the agreement when we met?" Nyamgondho told her that with his considerable wealth in cattle, he no longer needed such an ugly wife and he cursed her. Upon hearing this, the lady of the lake left their home and returned to the lake and, to Nyamgondho's horror, every one of his cows followed her: one by one they walked into the water, leaving him with no possessions.

The rock formations resembling the legendary lady of the lake's footsteps and those of her animals can be seen at the point where she entered the water in Nyandiwa Gwassi on the shores of Lake Victoria. People in the Nyanza region in Kenya believe that the water which flows above the "footsteps" has medicinal powers and they come from as far as Kisumu to collect it.
