= Nyala language =

Nyala can refer to 2 different languages:

- Nyala language (Sudan), a Daju (Nilo-Saharan) language spoken in Sudan
- East Nyala dialect, a Luhya (Bantu) dialect spoken in Kenya
- West Nyala language, a Nyoro–Ganda (Bantu) language spoken in Kenya
