= Coronials =

Potential cohort of Generation Alpha

Coronials (sometimes called Generation C which is often shortened to Gen C) is a term used to describe those conceived in the wake of the coronavirus pandemic (2020–2023).

== Background ==
Similarly to population growth following the initial decline in population due to natural disasters or war, such as Second World War baby boomers, coronials are conceived in one of two situations: increased sexual activity between self-isolated or locked-down couples, or population growth following the demise of the infection; which has been encouraged amongst some communities and governments.

== Origins ==
The name "coronials" is derived from the coronavirus and its affiliated pandemic, and the demographic group, Millennials. The term was mentioned on the This Week in Virology podcast in April 2020 as an alternative name for Gen Z, which was characterized as "a totally lame name". It was stated that the pandemic is a "defining event for what is being called Gen Z".

A Nurse Education Today paper in 2020 suggested that the term might be better applied to the cohort of nurses who completed their training during the pandemic. Chip Le Grand of The Sydney Morning Herald used the term to refer to "the generation of young people who finished high school and started uni in the COVID lockdown years".

== Alternative definition ==
The term may also be used to describe those of Generations Z and Alpha whose adolescent lives have been significantly impacted by the social effects of the pandemic. One such impact is that of school closures which began in March 2020 in several countries as part of precautionary measures to stop the spread of the virus. Those students whose examinations would not have taken place, for example those in the United Kingdom may be referred to as coronials.

== See also ==
- Millennials
- Generation Alpha
- Baby boomers
- Generation Beta
- Generation X
