= Laura J. Downing =

American linguist

Laura J. Downing (born 1954, Mitchel AFB, New York) is an American linguist, specializing in the phonology of African languages.

== Education and career ==
Downing earned her B.S. in linguistics from Georgetown University in 1977, and her PhD in linguistics from the University of Illinois in Urbana-Champaign in 1990. Her dissertation, The tonal phonology of Jita, was published by Lincom Europa in 1996. After receiving her PhD, she held several positions in North America before moving to Europe in 2001. She was a senior researcher at the ZAS (Center for General Linguistics) in Berlin from 2001 to 2012, and was professor of African Languages at the University of Gothenburg, Sweden, from 2012 until her retirement in 2021.

== Research ==
Downing's research centers on the formal analysis of the prosody of Bantu languages, including prosodic morphology, lexical and grammatical tone systems, information structure and phrasal prosody. Her research has contributed to a better understanding of the prosodic and morphological constraints on reduplication, especially in Bantu languages (Downing 2006). Her work with Lisa Cheng on the phonology-syntax interface, in particular in Zulu, shows the close interaction between the prosodic phrasings of a language and the syntactic structure within the Minimalist framework (Cheng & Downing 2009, 2016). Fieldwork over many years in Malawi in collaboration with Al Mtenje led to them co-authoring The Phonology of Chichewa (Downing & Mtenje 2017).

Downing was also involved in international collaborative projects funded by leading funding agencies. She co-directed, with Annie Rialland, a French-German ANR-DFG project, BANTUPSYN, devoted to the Phonology-syntax Interface in Bantu languages (2009–2012). This project led to a co-edited volume on Intonation in African tone languages (Downing & Rialland, eds., 2017). With Maarten Mous (Leiden University) and Morgan Nilsson (U of Gothenburg), she led a VR project investigating Somali prosody from 2016 to 2019.

== Honors and distinctions ==
- Honorary Member of the LSA (elected 2019)
- Vice-president then President of the Association of Contemporary African Linguistics (ACAL), 2017–2024; Member of the ACAL executive committee, 2014–2017. She was recognized with the ACAL Lifetime Achievement Award in 2026.
- Member of the KVVS (elected 2012); Member of AcademiaNet (elected 2017)
- Member of the Editorial Board of Phonology for 20+ years
- A Festschrift in Downing's honor was published in the open access journal, Stellenbosch Papers in Linguistics.

== Publications ==
Books

Laura J. Downing. 1996. The tonal phonology of Jita. LINCOM Studies in African Linguistics 05. Munich: LINCOM EUROPA. [revised version, dissertation]. 245 pp. ISBN 978-3-89586-032-4

Laura J. Downing. 2006. Canonical Forms in Prosodic Morphology. Oxford: Oxford University Press. 284 pp. ISBN 978-0-19-928639-3 doi:10.1093/acprof:oso/9780199286393.001.0001

Laura J. Downing and Al Mtenje. 2017. The Phonology of Chichewa. Phonology of the World's Languages. Oxford: Oxford University Press. ISBN 978-0-19-872474-2 doi:10.1093/oso/9780198724742.001.0001

Laura J. Downing and Annie Rialland, eds. 2017. Intonation in African Tone Languages. Phonology & Phonetics 24. Berlin: Mouton de Gruyter. ISBN 978-3-11-048479-3

Selected other publications

Lisa L.-S. Cheng and Laura J. Downing. 2009. Where's the topic in Zulu? In Helen de Hoop & Geertje van Bergen (eds.), Topics Cross-linguistically. Special issue, The Linguistic Review 26, 2/3: 207–238. doi:10.1515/tlir.2009.008

Laura J. Downing and Larry M. Hyman. 2016. Information Structure in Bantu Languages. In Caroline Féry & Shinichiro Ishihara (eds.), Handbook of Information Structure. Oxford University Press, 790–813. doi:10.1093/oxfordhb/9780199642670.013.010

Lisa L.-S. Cheng and Laura J. Downing. 2016. Phasal syntax = cyclic phonology? Syntax 19 (2), 159–191. doi:10.1111/synt.12120
