= Kabwa language =

Bantu language of Tanzania

Kabwa
- Native to: Tanzania
- Region: Mara Region
- Native speakers: 14,000 (2011)
- Language family: Niger–Congo?: Atlantic–Congo; Benue–Congo; Bantoid; Bantu; Northeast Bantu; Great Lakes Bantu; Logooli–Kuria (E.40); Kabwa

Language codes
- ISO 639-3: cwa
- Glottolog: kabw1241
- Guthrie code: JE.405
- ELP: Kabwa

Kabwa (Ekikabwa) is a Bantu language of northern Tanzania.

According to the Kabwa orthography statement published by SIL, Kabwa was spoken by approximately 8500 people in 2007. Kabwa is described in the orthography statement as a distinct language, although similar to Sweta and Kiroba (see Kuria language and Suba-Simbiti language), and having no dialects.

== Writing system ==
Kabwa alphabet
a	bh	ch	d	e	f	g	h	i	j	k	m	n	ng’	ny	o	p	r	s	sh	t	u	w	y
