= Marymount Catholic Secondary School =

Location
- Mzuzu; Malawi; 11.4425°S 34.0363°E

Information
- Established: 1963 (63 years ago)
- Website: https://www.marymount.mw/

Marymount Catholic Secondary School is a secondary boarding school for girls in Mzuzu, Malawi.

Originally built by the Missionary Sisters of the Immaculate Conception, the school opened in 1963 as a grant-aided secondary school. In 1992 the school was privatized, and is run by the Catholic Diocese of Mzuzu.

In 2022 a student died at the school, causing allegations of negligence.

== Alumnae ==
- Priscilla Kayira, media personality.
- Atikonda Mtenje-Mkochi (born 1983), linguist and lecturer.
- Mary Nangwale (1953–2016), police officer and diplomat.
