= Phonology: Theory and Analysis =

Book by Larry Hyman

- Author: Larry Hyman
- Language: English
- Subject: phonology
- Publisher: Holt, Rinehart & Winston
- Publication date: 1975
- Media type: Print (hardcover)
- ISBN: 9780030121418

Phonology: Theory and Analysis is a 1975 book by Larry Hyman designed for an introductory course in phonology.

== Reception ==
The book was reviewed by Alan H. Sommerstein, Dale E. Woolley and Irwin Howard.
