= Atikonda Mtenje-Mkochi =

Malawian linguist and lecturer

- Born: Atikonda Mtenje; 1983 (age 42–43)
- Education: University of Malawi, University of Cape Town
- Occupation: University dean
- Employer: Malawi University of Science and Technology (MUST)
- Parent(s): Alice and Al Mtenje

Atikonda Mtenje-Mkochi (born 1983) is a Malawian linguist and lecturer. She became the Executive Dean of the Bingu School of Culture and Heritage and a Director of the Malawi University of Science and Technology (MUST) in 2023. She was the first woman to serve as a director of MUST.

== Biography ==
Mtenje-Mkochi was born on 19 January 1983. She was the eldest of three daughters of Professor Al Mtenje and Alice Mtenje. She attended Marymount Girls' Catholic Secondary School before she obtained a Bachelor of Arts degree in humanities from the University of Malawi in 2006. She subsequently studied linguistics at the University of Cape Town in South Africa, where she obtained a Bachelor of Arts Honours degree, a Master of Arts degree, and a PhD in linguistics.

== Career ==
Mtenje-Mkochi has worked as a lecturer at Mzuzu University and the University of Malawi. She later joined the Malawi University of Science and Technology, where she has held academic and administrative positions including leading the Language and Communication Studies department. Mtenje-Mkochi acknowledged the support she had received from Professor Address Malata who led MUST and who adopted Mtenje-Mkochi as a mentee. Mtenje-Mkochi went on to lead the Bingu School of Culture and Heritage and its activities relating to culture, heritage, music and the humanities.

In 2025, MUST's Senate approved the introduction of a Master of Arts in Music as part of the university's efforts to expand her school's academic offerings in music. The school has hosted the MUST Cultural Innovation Festival, including its second edition in 2024. MUST's partner Kweza Arts offers short courses and training programs in the arts.

Mtenje-Mkochi is a member of the editorial board of the journal Advances in Sciences and Arts.

On the occasion of International Mother Language Day she spoke out in defence of mother languages including Chichewe and Chitumbuka. She saw indigenous languages as a tool to dismantle colonial power. On Africa Day in 2026, her photograph was featured in The Nation as part of a debate over an "identity crisis". The discussion focused on how to balance African identity with influences from outside the continent. In 2026 her mentor, Address Malata, announced her retirement and Mtenje-Mkochi published a tribute to her and her approach to leadership.

== Selected academic works ==
- A comparative analysis of the phonology and morpho-syntax of Cisukwa, Cindali and Cilambya.
- Malawian Nyiha Verbal Tonology.
- Linguistic and communication exclusion in COVID-19 awareness campaigns in Malawi.
- Arguments for a cluster analysis of nasal consonant sequences of Sukwa.
- Morphosyntactic Variation in Bantu, 2026
