= Abasuba Community Peace Museum =

Community museum in Ramba, Waware, Kenya

Coordinates: 0.4528°S 34.0579°E

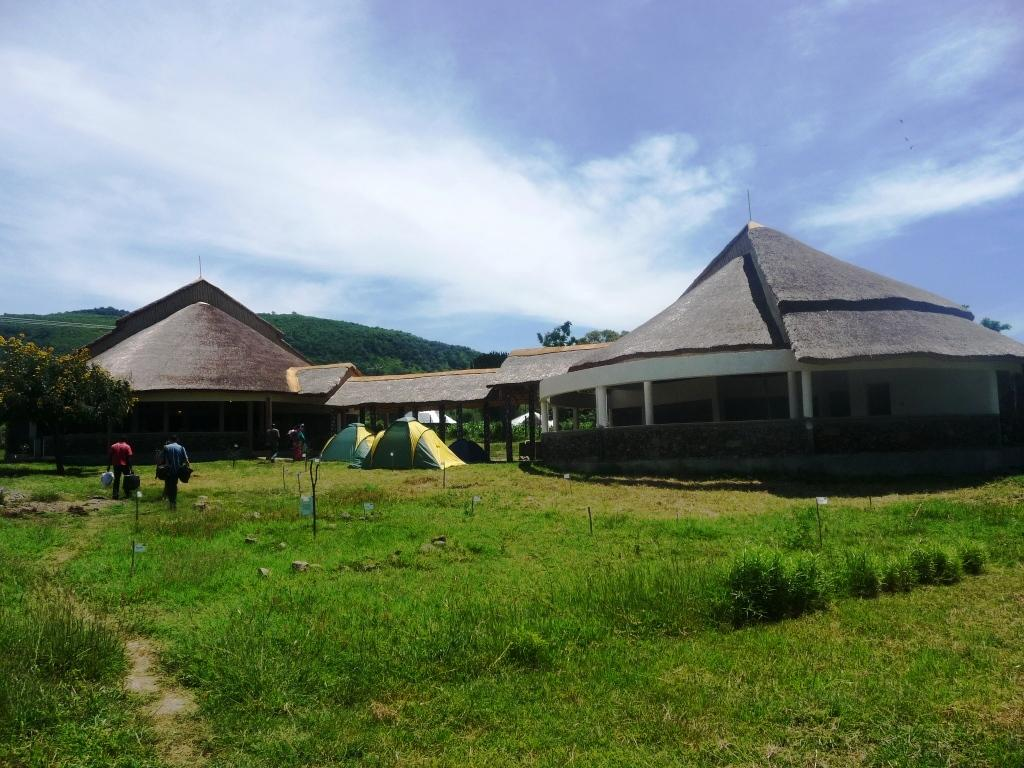
- Established: 2000
- Location: Mfangano, Kenya
- Type: Ethnographic
- Curator: Jack Wanyende
- Website: www.abasuba.museum

The Abasuba Community Peace Museum (ACPM) is a community museum in Ramba, Waware, Suba North District, Homa Bay County, Kenya. It was founded in 2000. It is one of several peace museums throughout Kenya.

The Abasuba Community Peace Museum organizes site stewardship and tours for the three pictograph sites located on Mfangano Island: Mawanga Cave, Kwitone Rock Shelter, and Kakiimba Rock Shelter. The museum is also a research centre for students, doctors, and other researchers interested in studying the archaeological sites of the Lake Victoria region or other topics related to the Abasuba People.

In 2007, TARA received a grant from the Kenyan Tourism Trust Fund (TTF) to increase awareness of rock art, to promote rock art for tourism and to conserve and develop sites in a way that will lead to improving the quality of life in Suba District and expand the museum's reach. As a result, a larger museum opened in 2008.

== Governing structure ==
The Abasuba Community Peace Museum is managed by the Curator, and overseen by board members representing the various communities in Suba District.
