= Suba language =

Bantu language

Suba
- Native to: Kenya
- Region: eastern shore Lake Victoria, Mfangano Island, Rusinga Island
- Ethnicity: Abasuba
- Native speakers: 157,787 (2019 census)
- Language family: Niger–Congo?: Atlantic–Congo; Volta-Congo; Benue–Congo; Bantoid; Bantu; Northeast Bantu; Great Lakes Bantu; East Nyanza; Nyanza Mara; Suba

Language codes
- ISO 639-3: sxb
- Glottolog: suba1238
- Guthrie code: JE.403 (shared w Suba-Simbiti)
- ELP: Suba

Kisuba, also known as Olusuba, is a Bantu language spoken by the Suba people of Kenya. The language features an extensive noun-classification system using prefixes that address gender and number. Suba clans are located on the eastern shore and islands of Lake Victoria in Kenya and Tanzania. They have formed alliances with neighboring clans, such as the Luo people, through intermarriages, and as a result a majority of Suba people are bilingual in Dholuo. The Suba religion has an ancient polytheistic history that includes writings of diverse, ancestral spirits. A recent revival of the Suba language and its culture has influenced the increasing number of native speakers each year.

== History ==
Suba is an African language spoken by the Sub-Saharan people on the eastern shores of Lake Victoria. Trade dependence was established in the mid-19th century between the Suba people and the Luo, a larger neighboring clan. After a period of interaction, both clans became accustomed to each other's traditions and practices. Eventually, through factors such as intermarriage, education, and religion, both clans combined and become known as the Luo-Suba. With Luo being the larger population, the alliance would decrease the demand for people to speak Suba, and in consequence, decreasing the number of native Suban speakers. Most Suban speakers became bilingual in both Suba and Luo. In the mid-1990s, a revival of the Suba language occurred after the Kenyan government initiated the Suba language project, where Suba was introduced as a subject in Kenyan primary schools. In addition, many written examples of the Suban language have been studied through ancient Suban religious texts. These texts depict a detailed polytheistic religion that describes spirits of ancient ancestors as protectors of family and land. Presently, Christianity is the major religion practiced by the Suban people, where in 2010, the New Testament was translated into Suba.

== Geographical distribution ==
The Suba language and its native speakers are located on the African eastern shores of Lake Victoria, populating both Kenya and Tanzania. Additionally, Suban natives are located on various islands within Lake Victoria.

== Grammar ==
Suban grammar and its characteristics are similar to other Bantu languages.

=== Phonology ===
Suba, being a Bantu language, consists of a Bantu phonology typical of other Bantu languages. In general, Suba consists of 11 consonants and 7 vowels. Constants only occur at the beginning of syllables, creating a syllable structure of V or CV. Syllables can begin with vowels but always need to end in them. Suban syllables also consist of two different tones, low and high. A high tone is marked with an acute accent (´), and a low is marked with a grave accent (`) or not marked at all. Low tones are more common in the Suban language.

=== Morphology/syntax ===
Its extensive noun classification system uses prefixing to mark gender and number, in turn determining whether the noun is singular or plural.

An important characteristic of Suban word structure is its ability to change number and meanings of words through minor changes to their words' prefixes. The prefix of a noun denotes the noun class and number to a noun, making a noun without a prefix meaningless. Most Bantu noun classification systems contain 22 noun classes, accommodating singular and plural forms as two separate noun classes. Instead, Suba contains ten noun classes by combining singular and plural forms into the same noun classes. Similarities in nominal and pronominal prefixes determine what noun belongs to what noun class. By establishing a smaller noun class, the Suba language can use a less extensive prefixing system to change the meaning and plurality of words. additionally, the meaning of the root noun can fluctuate depending on the prefix used, specifically seen in pronouns. The usual word order for the Suba language is SVO, similar to English and other Bantu languages. Adjectives and number roots must agree in noun class and number with the nouns they act on.

==== Samples 1 ====
Suba noun class
| | Class | Singular | Gloss | Plural | Gloss |
|---|---|---|---|---|---|
| 1 | Mu-wa | o-mwana | baby | a-wana | babies |
| 2 | Mu-mi | o-muti | tree | e-miti | trees |
| 3 | n-n | e-ngoko | hen | e-ngoko | hens |
| 4 | ki-bi | e-kitabu | a book | e-bitabu | books |
| 5 | li-ma | i-toke | banana | amatoke | bananas |
| 6 | ka-bu | ka-nafu | laziness | ba-nafu | laziness |
| 7 | lu-n | o-lusuba | olusuba | ----------- | ----------- |
| 8 | gu-ga | gu-bwa | bad dog | gu-bwa | bad dog |
| 9 | ku-ma | ku-tumbula | to boast | ma-tumbula | to boast |
| 10 | tu | tu-baka | a little sheep | -------------- | ------------ |

==== Sample 2 ====
Suba pronouns
| Pronoun | Subjective singular | Gloss | Subjective plural | Gloss | Objective singular | Gloss | Objective plural | Gloss |
|---|---|---|---|---|---|---|---|---|
| 1st person | inze | I | ifue | we | ifue | me | ifwe | us |
| 2nd person | iwue | you | mbaaria | you | iwue | you | muri | you |
| 3rd person | iyie | he | awu | they | ekiae | him | iwo | them |
| 3rd person | iyie | she | awu | they | ekiae | her | iwo | them |
| 3rd person | kiri | it | ekiae | they | ekiae | it | ekiawu | them |

== Writing system ==
The Suba writing system is based on the Latin script. The use of Latin script has made it easier for Suban people to practice Christianity and translate verses of biblical texts. The Suba numeral system also has Latin descent as it uses lower order to establish higher order. With Suba being one of the marginalized Bantu languages of Kenya, much more description of the language still needs to be studied.

=== Samples 1 ===
Latin alphabet
| Uppercase | A | B | C | D | E | F | G | H | I | J | K | L | M | N | O | P | Q | R | S | T | U | V | W | X | Y | Z |
| Lowercase | a | b | c | d | e | f | g | h | i | j | k | l | m | n | o | p | q | r | s | t | u | v | w | x | y | z |

=== Sample 2 ===
Suba numeral system
| Number | Reading | Meaning | Number | Reading | Meaning |
|---|---|---|---|---|---|
| 1 | endala | 1 | 11 | ikumi ne endala | 10+1 |
| 2 | iwiri | 2 | 12 | ikumi ni iwiri | 10+2 |
| 3 | isatu | 3 | 13 | ikumi ni isatu | 10+3 |
| 4 | ine | 4 | 14 | ikumi ni ine | 10+4 |
| 5 | itaanu | 5 | 15 | ikumi ni itaanu | 10+5 |
| 6 | mukaago | 6 | 16 | ikumi ni mukaaga | 10+6 |
| 7 | musamvu | 7 | 17 | ikumi ni musamvu | 10+7 |
| 8 | munaane | 8 | 18 | ikumi ni munaane | 10+8 |
| 9 | kienda | 9 | 19 | ikumi ná kienda | 10+9 |
| 10 | ikumi | 10 | 20 | amakumi awiri | 20 |
