= Subi language =

Bantu language spoken in Tanzania

Subi
- Native to: Tanzania
- Region: Lake Victoria
- Native speakers: 105,000 (2016)
- Language family: Niger–Congo?: Atlantic–Congo; Volta-Congo; Benue–Congo; Bantoid; Southern Bantoid; Bantu; Northeast Bantu; Great Lakes Bantu; Subi

Language codes
- ISO 639-3: xsj
- Glottolog: subi1247

Subi is a minor Bantu language of Tanzania, spoken on the southern shore of Lake Victoria. It is not listed in most sources, including Linguasphere. It has at times been confused with Shubi, though the two are not especially closely related.
