= Gungu language =

Bantu language of Uganda

Gungu
- Rugungu
- Native to: Uganda
- Region: Buliisa District
- Ethnicity: Gungu people
- Native speakers: 49,000 (2002 census)
- Language family: Niger–Congo?: Atlantic–Congo; Volta-Congo; Benue–Congo; Bantoid; Southern Bantoid; Bantu; Northeast Bantu; Great Lakes Bantu; Gungu
- Early form: Pre-Rugungu

Language codes
- ISO 639-3: rub
- Glottolog: gung1250
- Guthrie code: JE.101

Gungu is a Bantu language spoken by the Gungu (or Bagungu) people in western Uganda.

== Phonology ==
=== Consonants ===
Casali and Diprose tentatively argue that the labialized (Cʷ) and palatalized (Cʲ) sequences may be sequences of CuV and CiV, respectively.

Gungu consonants
			Bilabial			Labio-dental	Alveolar			Palatal			Velar			Glottal		
			plain	lab.	pal.	Labio-dental	plain	lab.	pal.	plain	lab.	pal.	plain	lab.	pal.	plain	lab.	pal.
Nasal		-nas	m ⟨m⟩	mʷ ⟨mw⟩	mʲ ⟨my⟩		n ⟨n⟩	nʷ ⟨nw⟩	nʲ ⟨ni̱⟩	ɲ ⟨ny⟩		ɲʲ ⟨nyi̱⟩	ŋ ⟨ngh⟩		ŋʲ ⟨nghy⟩			
Nasal		+nas	m̩m ⟨mm⟩	m̩mʷ ⟨mmw⟩	m̩mʲ ⟨mmy⟩		n̩n ⟨nn⟩	n̩nʷ ⟨nnw⟩	n̩nʲ ⟨nni⟩	ɲ̩ɲ ⟨nny⟩	ɲ̩ɲʷ ⟨nnyw⟩							
Stop/ Affricate	-voice	-nas	p ⟨p⟩	pʷ ⟨pw⟩	pʲ ⟨py⟩		t ⟨t⟩	tʷ ⟨tw⟩	tʲ ⟨ty⟩	t͡ʃ ⟨c⟩	t͡ʃʷ ⟨cw⟩	t͡ʃʲ ⟨cy⟩	k ⟨k⟩	kʷ ⟨kw⟩	kʲ ⟨ky⟩			
Stop/ Affricate	-voice	+nas	mp ⟨mp⟩	m̩pʷ ⟨mpw⟩	m̩pʲ ⟨mpy⟩		n̩t ⟨nt⟩	ⁿtʷ ⟨ntw⟩	ⁿtʲ ⟨nty⟩	ⁿt͡ʃ ⟨nc⟩	n̩t͡ʃʷ ⟨ncw⟩		ŋk ⟨nk⟩	ŋkʷ ⟨nkw⟩	ŋkʲ ⟨nky⟩			
Stop/ Affricate	+voice	-nas	b ⟨bb⟩	bʷ ⟨bbw⟩	bʲ ⟨bby⟩		d ⟨d⟩	dʷ ⟨dw⟩	dʲ ⟨dy⟩	d͡ʒ ⟨j⟩	d͡ʒʷ ⟨jw⟩	d͡ʒʲ ⟨jy⟩	g ⟨g⟩	gʷ ⟨gw⟩	gʲ ⟨gy⟩			
Stop/ Affricate	+voice	+nas	mb ⟨mb⟩	m̩bʷ ⟨mbw⟩	m̩bʲ ⟨mby⟩		n̩d ⟨nd⟩	ⁿdʷ ⟨ndw⟩	ⁿdʲ ⟨ndy⟩	ⁿd͡ʒ ⟨nj⟩	n̩d͡ʒʷ ⟨njw⟩		ŋg ⟨ng⟩	ŋ̩gʷ ⟨ngw⟩	ŋ̩gʲ ⟨ngy⟩			
Fricative	-voice	-nas				f ⟨f⟩	s ⟨s⟩	sʷ ⟨sw⟩	sʲ ⟨sy⟩							h ⟨h⟩	hʷ ⟨hw⟩	hʲ ⟨hy⟩
Fricative	-voice	+nas				n̩f ⟨nf⟩	ⁿs ⟨ns⟩	n̩sʷ ⟨nsw⟩	n̩sʲ ⟨nsy⟩									
Fricative	+voice	-nas	β ⟨b⟩		βʲ ⟨by⟩	v ⟨v⟩	z ⟨z⟩	zʷ ⟨zw⟩	zʲ ⟨zy⟩									
Fricative	+voice	+nas				ⁿv ⟨nv⟩	n̩z ⟨nz⟩	ⁿzʷ ⟨nzw⟩	ⁿzʲ ⟨nzy⟩									
Tap							ɾ ⟨r⟩	ɾʷ ⟨rw⟩	ɾʲ ⟨ry⟩									
Approximant			ʋ ⟨b̯⟩	ʋʷ ⟨b̯w⟩			l ⟨l⟩	lʷ ⟨lw⟩	lʲ ⟨ly⟩	j ⟨y⟩	jʷ ⟨yw⟩			w ⟨w⟩				

=== Vowels ===
Gungu has 14 vowel phonemes. The mid vowels are variants of the open-mid vowels. Vowels before prenasalized consonants and after labialized and palatalized consonants are always long but are written short. The close and mid vowels are considered "hard", and the others are considered "soft." Gungu has a form of vowel harmony, in which the mid vowels generally only appear in words with the "hard" close vowels.

==== Monophthongs ====
Gungu vowels
	Front		Central		Back	
	Short	Long	Short	Long	Short	Long
Close	i ⟨i̱⟩	iː ⟨i̱i̱⟩			u ⟨u̱⟩	uː ⟨u̱u̱⟩
Near-close	ɪ ⟨i⟩	ɪː ⟨ii⟩			ʊ ⟨u⟩	ʊː ⟨u⟩
Mid	(e ⟨e⟩)	(eː ⟨ee⟩)			(o ⟨o⟩)	(oː ⟨oo⟩)
Open-mid	ɛ ⟨e⟩	ɛː ⟨ee⟩			ɔ ⟨o⟩	ɔː ⟨oo⟩
Open			ä ⟨a⟩	äː ⟨aa⟩		

==== Diphthongs ====
Gungu has eight diphthongs.

Gungu diphthongs
	Front Hard	Front Soft	Back Hard	Back Soft
Mid	ei̯ ⟨ei̱⟩	ɛɪ̯ ⟨ei⟩	oi̯ ⟨oi̱⟩	ɔɪ̯ ⟨oi⟩
Open	äi̯ ⟨ai̱⟩	äɪ̯ ⟨ai⟩	äu̯ ⟨au̱⟩	äʊ̯ ⟨au⟩

=== Tone ===
Tone is only marked on Gungu verbs indicating the recent past. This tense is marked with a plus symbol (+).

== Orthography ==
Gungu alphabet
Capital	Lowercase	IPA
A	a	/ä/
Aa	aa	/äː/
B	b	/β/
B̯	b̯	/ʋ/
Bb	bb	/b/
C	c	/t͡ʃ/
D	d	/d/
E	e	/e/, /ɛ/
Ee	ee	/eː/, /ɛː/
F	f	/f/
G	g	/g/
H	h	/h/
I	i	/ɪ/
II	ii	/ɪː/
I̱	i̱	/i/
I̱I̱	i̱i̱	/iː/
J	j	/d͡ʒ/
K	k	/k/
L	l	/l/
M	m	/m/
N	n	/n/
Ngh	ngh	/ŋ/
Ny	ny	/ɲ/
O	o	/o/, /ɔ/
Oo	oo	/oː/, /ɔː/
P	p	/p/
R	r	/ɾ/
S	s	/s/
T	t	/t/
U	u	/ʊ/
Uu	uu	/ʊ/
U̱	u̱	/u/
U̱U̱	u̱u̱	/uː/
V	v	/v/
W	w	/w/
Y	y	/j/
Z	z	/z/
