= Malawi Engineering Institution =

Engineering society

The Malawi Engineering Institution (MEI) is a regulator and professional engineering institution of engineers and technicians in Malawi.

== History ==
The Engineers Act of 1972 came into effect of 1 March 1974 and established an Engineering Board. MEI was established by an act of parliament in 2019, replacing the 1972 Engineers Act. The MEI was created following the merger of two institutions, the Malawi Board of Engineers and the Malawi Institution of Engineers (MIE). The new act of parliament was pending for several years. The 2019 act required that all practising engineers in the country register with the institution, with special rules for expatriates.

In 2024, MEI's chairperson and the Ministry of Energy's Principal Secretary, Alfonso Chiluni, wrote to the Road Authority to request adequate roads. The MEI considered the roads to be unsafe and, in particular, a section of the M10 that frequently flooded.

In 2026, the national body urged professional engineering organisations such as the MEI to introduce minimum fees for contracts. They believed that tight budgets encouraged poor quality as there was insufficient money to finance a reasonable level of quality.

The Institution involves engineering students and also supported the Malawi University of Science and Technology (MUST) Engineering Symposium in 2026.
