= Malawi University of Science and Technology =

Public university in Thyolo in South Malawi

Coordinates: 15.9018°S 35.2169°E

- Type: Public
- Established: 2012
- Vice-Chancellor: Address Mauakowa Malata
- Location: Thyolo, Southern Region, Malawi
Colours
Red, black, green, white
- Website: www.must.ac.mw

The Malawi University of Science and Technology (MUST) is a public university in Thyolo in South Malawi. It was established on 17 December 2012. MUST opened doors in March 2014, the first undergraduate programmes were:

1. Metallurgy and Materials Engineering

2. Chemical Engineering

3. Biomedical Engineering

== History ==
The university was founded in 2012.

When Address Mauakowa Malata was appointed at the university's vice chancellor in 2019, she became the first woman to achieve that position at any of Malawi's universities.

The (MUST) Engineering Symposium is an annual event celebrating innovation and including the Malawi Engineering Institution. MUST's head of Engineering, Lovemore Nkukuma, welcomed sponsorship from Presscane Ltd in 2026.

In 2026, Address Malata, announced her retirement as vice-chancellor. One of her mentees, Atikonda Mtenje-Mkochi, published a tribute to her and the "9 lessons" that underlined her approach to leadership.

== Undergraduate programmes ==
1. Bachelor of Engineering (Hons) in Biomedical Engineering
2. Bachelor of Engineering (Hons) in Chemical Engineering
3. Bachelor of Engineering (Hons) in Metallurgy and Materials Engineering
4. Bachelor of Engineering (Hons) in Manufacturing Engineering
5. Bachelor of Engineering Polymer and Textile Engineering (Hons)
6. Bachelor of Science in Mathematical sciences
7. Bachelor of Science in Earth Science (Geology)
8. Bachelor of Science in Meteorology and Climate Science
9. Bachelor of Science Geo-Information and Earth observation Science
10. Bachelor of Science Disaster Risk Management
11. Bachelor of Science in Business Information Technology
12. Bachelor of Science in Medical Microbiology
13. Bachelor of Science in Medical Imaging Diagnostic Radiography
14. Bachelor of Science in Medical Imaging Diagnostic Ultrasound
15. Bachelor of Science in Computer Systems and Security
16. Bachelor of Science in Sustainable Energy Systems
17. Bachelor of Science in Water Quality and Management
18. Bachelor of Science in Sport Science
19. Bachelor of Arts in Indigenous Knowledge Systems and Practices
20. Bachelor of Arts in African Musicology
21. Bachelor of Arts in Archives and Record Management
22. Bachelor of Science in Mathematical Sciences
23. Bachelor of Science in Science Education (Mathematics, Physics and Chemistry)

== Postgraduate programmes ==
1. Master of Science in Innovation
2. Master of Science in Entrepreneurship

== Alumni ==
- Nthanda Manduwi writer and entrepreneur

== Faculty ==
Atikonda Mtenje-Mkochi was the first woman to be a director of MUST and was the only woman apart from Address Malata on the university's senior team. She is an executive dean and she leads the school of Bingu School of Culture and Heritage.

=== Mixon Faluweki ===
Mixon is a lecturer in Physics. He invented the Padoko charger that was critical in assisting people to be able to charge their gadgets just from peddling a bicycle.

=== Gama Bandawe ===
Gama Bandawe is a medical virologist and an associate professor in biomedical sciences in the Department of Biological Sciences in the Academy of Medical Sciences at MUST. He has published extensively on HIV/AIDS with clinical perspectives. He is the Coordinator of the center for Clinical and Biological Sciences Research (CCBSR) in the Academy of Medical Sciences. He is also the lead scientist in the newly established MUST Bacteriophage Research Unit (MBRU). Gama has championed collaborations between the University and the seeding labs program which has/is benefited/benefiting the university at large.

=== Andrew Mtewa ===
Lecturer in Chemistry and PhD fellow in drug development with a translational research approach focusing on drugs from hit sources to the clinic. He has authored books, book chapters and journal articles.

=== Prof. Wilson Mandala ===
He is the Executive Dean of the Academy of Medical Sciences and Professor of Immunology. has successfully supervised at least five PhD and three MSc fellows. In terms of management, Professor Mandala has served as Director of the Research Support Centre at College of Medicine for two years and also served as Associate Director of the MLW. He also served as the Grant Director of Wellcome Trust funded SACORE and has served as the Malawian Board member on CARTA Board

=== Dumisani Namakhwa ===
He was a biomedical engineering student who has won awards: National Bank of Malawi excellency Award; Finalist in 2021 Envision the Future Dell Technologies Graduation Project Competition (pending); Finalist of the 2020 Africa Biomedical Engineering Consortium Design competition. (January 2021); Awarded Higher Education Partnership in Sub-Saharan African (HEP SSA of the Royal Academy of Engineering) innovation award by Lilongwe University of Agriculture and Natural resources (August 2020). He also published article(s) in international journal(s).

== See also ==
- List of universities in Malawi
- Education in Malawi
