= Kobo language =

Bantu language spoken in the Democratic Republic of the Congo

Kobo
- Native to: Democratic Republic of the Congo
- Region: Ikobo, Nord-Kivu province
- Native speakers: 50,000 (2014)
- Language family: Niger–Congo?: Atlantic–Congo; Benue–Congo; Bantoid; Bantu; Northeast Bantu; Great Lakes Bantu; Konzo?; Kobo

Language codes
- ISO 639-3: okc
- Glottolog: ikum1241

Kobo is a Bantu language spoken in the Democratic Republic of the Congo. It is approximately equidistant between Nande and Hunde, but is not mutually intelligible with either.

== Writing system ==
Kobo alphabet
a	b	e	f	g	h	i	ɨ	k	l	m	mb	n	nd	ng
nv	ny	nz	o	p	r	s	sh	t	th	ts	u	ʉ	w	y
