= Kara language (Tanzania) =

Bantu language of Tanzania

Kara
- Regi
- Native to: Tanzania
- Region: Lake Victoria
- Native speakers: (86,000 cited 1987)
- Language family: Niger–Congo?: Atlantic–Congo; Volta-Congo; Benue–Congo; Bantoid; Southern Bantoid; Bantu; Northeast Bantu; Great Lakes Bantu; East Nyanza; Suguti; Kara

Language codes
- ISO 639-3: reg
- Glottolog: kara1481
- Guthrie code: JE.252

Kara, or Regi, is a Bantu language of Tanzania, spoken off Ukerewe Island in Lake Victoria. Jita–Kara–Kwaya are close to being dialects.
