= Yaka language (Kivu) =

Bantu language of DR Congo

Yaka
- Native to: Democratic Republic of Congo
- Region: Lake Kivu
- Language family: Niger–Congo?: Atlantic–Congo; Benue–Congo; Bantoid; Bantu; Northeast Bantu; Great Lakes Bantu; Shi–Havu?; Yaka

Language codes
- ISO 639-3: None (mis)
- Glottolog: None
- Guthrie code: JD.502

Yaka is a minor Bantu language of the Democratic Republic of the Congo, on the north shore of Lake Kivu.
