= Gusii language =

Bantu language spoken in western Kenya

Gusii
- Ekegusii
- Native to: Kenya
- Region: Nyanza Kenya, Kisii County & Nyamira County, Southern Rift Valley, parts of Kericho County & Bomet County
- Ethnicity: Abagusii
- Native speakers: 2.2 million (2009 census)
- Language family: Niger–Congo?: Atlantic-Congo; Volta-Congo; Benue–Congo; Bantoid; Southern Bantoid; Bantu; Northeast Bantu; Great Lakes Bantu; East Nyanza; Nyanza Mara; North Mara; Gusii
- Dialects: Ekegusii Proper; Bogirango Maate
- Writing system: Latin (after European contact)

Language codes
- ISO 639-3: guz
- Glottolog: gusi1247
- Guthrie code: JE.42

The Gusii language (also known as Ekegusii) is a Bantu language spoken in Kisii and Nyamira counties in Nyanza Province, Kenya, whose headquarters is Kisii Town (between the Kavirondo Gulf of Lake Victoria and the border with Tanzania). It is spoken natively by 2.2 million people (as of 2009), mostly among the Abagusii. Ekegusii has only two dialects: The Rogoro (upper-side) and Maate (lower-side) dialects. Phonologically, they differ in the articulation of /t/. Most of the variations existing between the two dialects are lexical. The two dialects can refer to the same object or thing using different terms. An example of this is the word for cat. While one dialect calls a cat ekemoni, the other calls it ekebusi (a word that comes from the sound used to call a cat in Gusii culture). Another illustrating example can be found in the word for sandals. While the Rogoro word for sandals is chisiripasi (a loanword from the English word "slippers"), the Maate dialect word is chitaratara ( "tara" -"walk". Possibly from the sound made by sandals when one walks while wearing them). Many more lexical differences manifest in the language. The Maate dialect is spoken in Tabaka and Bogirango. Most of the other regions use the Rogoro dialect, which is also the standard dialect of Ekegusii.

== Phonology ==
=== Vowels ===
Gusii has seven vowels. Vowel length is contrastive, i.e. the words 'bóra' to miss and 'bóóra' to say are distinguished by vowel length only.

Phonetic inventory of vowels in Gusii
	Front	Central	Back
Close	i		u
Close-mid	e		o
Open-mid	ɛ		ɔ
Open		a	

=== Consonants ===
In the table below, orthographic symbols are included between brackets if they differ from the IPA symbols. Note especially the use of ‘y’ for IPA /j/, common in African orthographies. When symbols appear in pairs, the one to the right represents a voiced consonant.

Phonemic inventory of consonants in Gusii
	labial	alveolar	palatal	velar
plosive		t		k
affricate			tʃ	
fricative	β	s		ɣ
nasal	m	n	ɲ	ŋ
tap		ɾ		
approximant	w		j	

Phonetic inventory of consonants in Gusii
	labial	alveolar	palatal	velar
plosive	p b	t d		k ɡ
affricate			tʃ	
fricative	β	s		ɣ
nasal	m	n	ɲ	ŋ
tap		ɾ		
approximant	w		j	

The following morphophonological alternations occur:

- n+r = [ⁿd]
- n+b = [ᵐb]
- n+g = [ᵑɡ]
- n+k = [ᵑk]
- n+c = [ⁿtʃ]
- n+s = [ⁿs]
- n+m = [mː]

The Gusii language has the consonant 'b' not realized as the bilabial stop as in 'bat' but as bilabial fricative as in words like baba, baminto, abana.

== Orthography ==
	Ekegusii alphabet (Kenya)																												
Gusii letters	A	B	C	D	E	Ë	G	H	I	K	M	N	O	Ö	R	S	T	U	W	Y	ei	ie	io	oi	-	-	-	-	-
Multigraphs	Mb	Bw	Mbw	Ch	Nch	Chw	Nchw	Nd	Ndw	Ng	Gw	Ngw	Ng'	Ng'w	Ny	Nyw	Nk	Kw	Nkw	Mw	Nw	Rw	Ns	Sw	Nsw	Nt	Tw	Ntw	Yw

== Grammar ==
=== Noun classes ===
Gusii Noun Classes with examples
	Class	Singular	Gloss	Plural	Gloss
1	omo-aba	omonto	person/human	abanto	people/humans
2	omo-eme	omotwe	head	emetwe	head
3	e-ch	eng'ombe	cow	chiombe	cows
4	ege-ebi	egekombe	cup	ebikombe	cups
5	ri-ama	ritunda	fruit	amatunda	fruits
6	o-o	obwoba	cowardness	obwoba	cowardness
7	e-e	ekegusii	ekegusii	-----------	-----------
8	ama-ama	amabere	milk	amabere	milk
9	omo-i-seke	omoiseke	girl	aba-i-seke	girls
10				--------------	------------

=== Numbers ===
Gusii Numeral System
Number	Reading	Meaning	Number	Reading	Meaning
1	eyemo	1	11	ikomi nemo	10+1
2	ibere	2	12	ikomi na ibere	10+2
3	isato	3	13	ikomi na isato	10+3
4	inye	4	14	ikomi na inye	10+4
5	isano	5	15	ikomi na isano	10+5
6	isano nemo	5+1	16	ikomi na isano nemo	10+5+1
7	isano na ibere	5+2	17	ikomi na isano na ibere	10+5+2
8	isano na isato	5+3	18	ikomi na isano na isato	10+5+3
9	kianda	9	19	ikomi na kianda	10+9
10	ikomi	10	20	emerongo ebere	20

=== Sample phrases ===
English	Ekegusii
Good Morning	Bwakire buya
Good night	Obotuko obuya
Head	omotwe
Ear	ogoto
Water	amache
evening	mogoroba
grandfather	sokoro
to know	komanya
to milk	gokama
donkey	etigere/ebunda
Earth	ense
Dwell	menya
Homeland	inka
Today	rero
Sun	risase/omobaso
Dog	esese
Stand	-tenena
Know	-manya
See	-rora
Upperside/Hillside	rogoro
Lake/Sea	enyancha
Desert	eroro
Fighter	omorwani
Roll Over	-garagara
Milk	amabere
She goat	esibeni
Cowdung	esike
Lady	omosubati
Harvest (verb/noun)	gesa/rigesa
Cry	rera
Walk	tara
Look	Rigereria
Tomorrow	mambia

== Bibliography ==
=== Bickmore, Lee ===
- 1997. Problems in constraining High tone spread in Ekegusii. Lingua, vol. 102, pp. 265–290.
- 1998. Metathesis and Dahl’s Law in Ekegusii. Studies in the Linguistic Sciences, vol. 28:2, pp. 149–168.
- 1999. High Tone Spreading in Ekegusii Revisited: An Optimality Theoretic Account. Lingua, vol. 109, pp. 109–153.

=== Cammenga, Jelle ===
- 2002 Phonology and morphology of Ekegusii: a Bantu language of Kenya. Köln: Rüdiger Köppe Verlag.

=== Mreta, Abel Y. ===
- 2008. Kisimbiti: Msamiati wa Kisimbiti-Kiingereza-Kiswahili na Kiingereza-Kisimbiti-Kiswahili / Simbiti-English-Swahili and English-Simbiti-Swahili Lexicon. Languages of Tanzania Project, LOT Publications Lexicon Series 7, 106 pp., ISBN 9987-691-09-9.

=== Nash, Carlos M. ===
- 2011. Tone in Ekegusii: A Description of Nominal And Verbal Tonology. University of California, Santa Barbara.

=== Nyauncho, Osinde K. ===
- 1988. Ekegusii morphophonology: an analysis of the major consonantal processes. University of Nairobi.

=== Whiteley, Wilfred H. ===
- 1956 A practical introduction to Gusii. Dar es Salaam/Nairobi/Kampala: East African Literature Bureau. Available Here
- 1960 The tense system of Gusii. Kampala: East African Institute of Social Research.
- 1974 Language in Kenya. Nairobi: Oxford University Press.

=== Omonyi, Moses Mark. ===
- 2020 Local languages-Ekegusii. Kibabii University

== See also ==
- Languages of Kenya
