= Suba people (Kenya) =

Bantu group of people in Kenya

Abasuba
Total population
- 157,787

Regions with significant populations
- Kenya

Languages
- Kisuba • Kiswahili. Dholuo

Religion
- African Traditional Religion • Christianity

Related ethnic groups
- other East Nyanza Bantu peoples

The Suba (also known as the Abasuba) are an ethnic group native to eastern Lake Victoria, predominantly residing in Homa Bay County and Migori County of southwestern Kenya, as well as across parts of Mara Region in northern Tanzania. In Kenya, the Suba inhabit the offshore islands of Rusinga and Mfangano, as well as mainland shores including Mbita, Suna, and Gwassi. In the 2019 Kenya Population and Housing Census, the Suba population was enumerated at 157,787.

Linguistically and historically of Bantu origin belonging to the Great Lakes Bantu branch, the Suba migrated to eastern Lake Victoria between the mid-17th and 18th centuries from the Kingdom of Buganda and Busoga in present-day Uganda, fleeing succession conflicts and internal warfare. Upon establishing settlements along Lake Victoria, the Suba interacted intensively with incoming Western Nilotic Luo groups. Over centuries of contact, intermarriage, and social assimilation, most Suba adopted Dholuo as their primary spoken language, leading to significant linguistic endangerment of the indigenous Olusuba language.

Despite linguistic convergence with the Luo, the Suba have maintained distinct cultural institutions, including male circumcision ceremonies, clan totems, sacred rainmaking shrines (emisambwa), and archaeological rock art traditions. Since the late 20th century, the community has spearheaded a major cultural and linguistic revival, supported by the Suba Language Project founded by linguist Duncan Okoth Okombo, the publication of an Olusuba Bible and educational curricula, and the annual Rusinga Cultural Festival.

== Language barrier ==
One of the biggest issues relating to the Suba language declination is the sole fact that Kenya viewed the language as inferior. The education system is teaching English and Luo to the newer generations of Suba children thus impairing the possibilities of the language to come back. Some even say that the fluent language speakers are middle-aged and have yet to establish a system to rebuild the language so that it may take proper footing as one of Africa's many languages, thus it has established a language status of at risk. Many blame the elders as they do not take proper measures to ensure the language's existence by teaching their young ones from an early onset. The biggest concern deriving from the pressures of reviving the language is the fear that their children will begin to build an identity crisis while attending school, considering that it is taught in either English or Luo.

Other than the Rusinga Festival, one of the most recent efforts to preserve the dying language has been the production of a Bible in Suba. Efforts to translate the Bible into Suba started as early as 1988, but it was only completed in 2011.

== Notable Suba people ==
- Tom Mboya
- Mbadi John Ng'ongo, politician
- Ezekiel Odero, televangelist
- Duncan Okoth Okombo (1950–2017), professor of linguistics and founder of the Suba Language Project
- Philip Ochieng, journalist
- Millie Odhiambo, politician
- John Henry Okwanyo, politician
- Quincy Timberlake, politician

== See also ==
- Rusinga Cultural Festival
- Tom Mboya
- Luo people of Kenya and Tanzania
- Baganda
