= Kwaya language =

Bantu language of Tanzania

Kwaya
- Native to: Tanzania
- Region: Mara Region
- Native speakers: 120,000 (2005)
- Language family: Niger–Congo?: Atlantic–Congo; Volta-Congo; Benue–Congo; Bantoid; Southern Bantoid; Bantu; Northeast Bantu; Great Lakes Bantu; East Nyanza; Suguti; Kwaya
- Dialects: Kwaya; Ruri

Language codes
- ISO 639-3: kya
- Glottolog: kway1241
- Guthrie code: JE.251,253

Kwaya is a Bantu language of Tanzania spoken by the Kwaya people. Jita–Kara–Kwaya are close to being dialects; Maho (2009) separates Ruri from Kwaya as equally distinct.
