= Reproductive Health (journal) =

Medical journal

- Discipline: Sexual health
- Language: English
- Edited by: José M. Belizán; Sanni Yaya

Publication details
- History: 2004–present
- Publisher: BioMed Central
- Frequency: Continuous
- Open access: Yes
- Impact factor: 2.295 (2018)

Standard abbreviations
- ISO 4: Reprod. Health

Indexing
- ISSN: 1742-4755
- LCCN: 2004243541
- OCLC no.: 992874870

Links
- Journal homepage; Online archive

Reproductive Health is an online-only open access medical journal with a focus on sexual health. It was established in 2004 and is published continuously by BioMed Central. The editors-in-chief are José M. Belizán (Institute for Clinical Effectiveness and Health Policy) and Sanni Yaya (University of Ottawa). According to the Journal Citation Reports, the journal has a 2018 impact factor of 2.295.
