= Introducing Phonology (Odden book) =

Book by David Odden

- Author: David Odden
- Language: English
- Subject: phonology
- Publisher: Cambridge University Press
- Publication date: 2005 (1st ed), 2013 (2nd ed)
- Media type: Print (hardcover)
- Pages: 348
- ISBN: 9781107627970

Introducing Phonology is a 2005 book by David Odden designed for an introductory course in phonology for both graduates and undergraduates.

== Reception ==
The book was reviewed by Emily Curtis and Miguel Cuevas-Alonso. It also received short reviews from B. Elan Dresher (University of Toronto), Bert Vaux (University of Cambridge) and Martin Krämer (University of Tromsø).
