= West Nyala language =

Bantu language of western Kenya

West Nyala
- Native to: Kenya
- Region: Great Lakes region
- Language family: Niger–Congo?: Atlantic–Congo; Volta-Congo; Benue–Congo; Bantoid; Bantu; Northeast Bantu; Great Lakes Bantu; Masaba-Luhya; West Nyala
- Dialects: Nyara

Language codes
- ISO 639-3: (included in East Nyala [nle])
- Glottolog: west2861
- Guthrie code: JE.18

West Nyala is a Bantu language of western Kenya, on the shores of Lake Victoria. It is a part of the Luhya branch of Great Lakes Bantu.
