= Ngoreme language =

Bantu language of Tanzania

Ngurimi
- Dengurume
- Native to: Tanzania
- Region: Mara Region
- Native speakers: 55,000 (2005)
- Language family: Niger–Congo?: Atlantic–Congo; Volta-Congo; Benue–Congo; Bantoid; Southern Bantoid; Bantu; Northeast Bantu; Great Lakes Bantu; East Nyanza; Nyanza Mara; Ngurimi

Language codes
- ISO 639-3: ngq
- Glottolog: ngur1263
- Guthrie code: JE.401

Ngurimi (Ngoreme) is a Bantu language of Tanzania. Ngoreme is spoken in the Serengeti District of the Mara Region of north-west Tanzania by some 55,000 people. There are two main dialects of Ngoreme - a northern dialect and a southern dialect - which maintain mutual intelligibility.

== Phonology ==
Ngoreme shares a vowel inventory with the majority of the Mara languages: /i e ɛ a ɔ o u/. However, Ngoreme has an asymmetrical vowel inventory, with 7 phonemic vowels in nouns but only 5 vowels (/i ɛ a ɔ u/) in verbs.

== Nominal system ==
In common with many Bantu languages, Ngoreme nouns typically consist of a noun stem, a noun class prefix and an augment (or pre-prefix) vowel. Augment vowels are invariable but the vowels that occurs in the noun class prefixes commonly exhibit variant forms as determined by vowel harmony. Ngoreme has 19 noun classes, with the classes 1-10 exhibiting regular singular/plural pairings, class 11 is attested, as is class 12 which contains diminutives, class 14 is also found. Class 15 contains verb nouns (or infinitives), class 16, 17 and 18 are also attested and are the locative classes. Class 19 is the plural diminutive class whilst class 20 is a (singular) augmentative class.
