= Nyindu language =

Bantu language

Nyindu
- Kinyindu
- Native to: Democratic Republic of Congo
- Region: Sud-Kivu Province
- Ethnicity: Banyindu
- Native speakers: 8,400 (2002)
- Language family: Niger–Congo?: Atlantic–Congo; Benue–Congo; Bantoid; Bantu; Northeast Bantu; Great Lakes Bantu; Shi–Havu; Nyindu

Language codes
- ISO 639-3: nyg
- Glottolog: nyin1248
- Guthrie code: JD.501

- Person: Munyindu
- People: Banyindu
- Language: Kinyindu
- Country: Bunyindu

Nyindu is an endangered Bantu language of the Democratic Republic of the Congo. It is used as a first language by all adults in the Banyindu community, but not by all young people. It is not taught in schools.

Many Nyindu consider their language to be a variety of Lega-Mwenga, but Lega- and Shi-speakers consider the language to be Shi. Otterloo classifies it as closest to Fuliiru.
