= SOAS Working Papers in Linguistics =

- Discipline: Linguistics
- Language: English

Publication details
- Publisher: School of Oriental and African Studies (United Kingdom)

Standard abbreviations
- ISO 4: SOAS Work. Pap. Linguist.

Links
- Journal homepage

SOAS Working Papers in Linguistics are an outlet for research in progress conducted by staff, research students and research associates in the Department of Linguistics at the School of Oriental and African Studies (SOAS), University of London. The papers are open-access.

The series began in 1990, with Volume 1, being edited by Asli Göksel. Early volumes were entitled SOAS Working Papers in Linguistics and Phonetics.

Dr Alia Amir is co-editor of Volume 23 (2025) a special issue focusing on Frontiers in Education.
