= Introducing Phonology (Hawkins book) =

Book by Peter Hawkins

- Author: Peter Hawkins
- Language: English
- Subject: phonology
- Publisher: Hutchinson
- Publication date: 1984
- Media type: Print (hardcover)

Introducing Phonology is a 1984 book by Peter Hawkins designed for an introductory course in phonology for both graduates and undergraduates.

== Author ==
Peter Hawkins was a professor at Victoria University of Wellington working on different aspects of New Zealand English.

== Reception ==
The book was reviewed by Richard Coates, Alan S. Kaye, Włodzimierz Sobkowiak and François Chevillet.
