= René Kager =

Dutch linguist (born 1957)

- Born: 17 July 1957 (age 69); Hilversum, Netherlands

Academic background
- Education: Utrecht University (PhD)
- Thesis: A metrical theory of stress and destressing in English and Dutch (1989)

Academic work
- Discipline: linguistics
- Sub-discipline: phonology
- Institutions: Utrecht University

René Willibrord Joseph Kager (Dutch: [rəˈneː ˈkaːɣər]; born 17 July 1957) is a Dutch linguist and Chair of English Linguistics and Phonology at Utrecht University. He is known for his works on phonology.

== Career ==
Kager is a theoretical phonologist and works on child language acquisition. In his theoretical work he focuses on metric word stress and phonotactics in optimality theory and early perception of word prosodic properties such as tone, stress and rhythm, and segmental contrasts, in monolingual and bilingual infants. He is also involved in modeling aspects of phonological acquisition through artificial language learning studies. He has received several major national grants, including a VICI grant from the Netherlands Organization for Scientific Research (NWO) (2005-2010) on the role of phonotactics in speech segmentation. He is currently a Principal investigator in the Consortium on Individual Development.

== Books ==
- Optimality Theory. Cambridge University Press. 1999
