= David Odden =

American academic

David Arnold Odden (/ˈoʊdən/; born 1954) is professor emeritus of Linguistics at the Ohio State University. His contributions to linguistics have been in the area of phonology and language description, most notably African tone and the description of Bantu languages. In addition, his work on the obligatory contour principle (OCP) has been instrumental to an understanding of that phenomenon. He is the former editor of Studies in African Linguistics and a current editorial board member of Natural Language and Linguistic Theories.

Odden received his BA in linguistics from the University of Washington in 1975 and his PhD from University of Illinois in 1981. From 1981 to 1984 he taught at Washington State University, Michigan State University and Yale University before joining the faculty of Ohio State University in 1985. He was made a full professor there in 1999. Odden was also the Leverhulme Visiting Professor at the School of Languages and Linguistics, University of Durham in 2003 and Fulbright Professor at the University of Tromsø, Norway from 1999 to 2000.

== Selected works ==
- —— (2011) [1995]. "Rules v. Constraints". In Goldsmith, John; Riggle, Jason; Yu, Alan C. L. (eds.). The handbook of phonological theory (2nd ed.). pp. 1–39. doi:10.1002/9781444343069.ch1. ISBN 978-1-4051-5768-1.
- —— (2005). Introducing Phonology. Cambridge University Press. ISBN 978-1-107-62797-0.
- —— (1996). The Phonology and Morphology of Kimaatuumbi. Oxford University Press.
- —— (1991). "Vowel geometry". Phonology. 8 (2): 261–289. doi:10.1017/S0952675700001408. JSTOR 4420037. S2CID 251052057.
- —— (1988). "Anti antigemination and the OCP" (PDF). Linguistic Inquiry. 19 (3): 451–475. JSTOR 25164904.
- —— (1986). "On the role of the obligatory contour principle in phonological theory". Language. 62 (2): 353–383. doi:10.2307/414677. JSTOR 414677.
