= Lisa Cheng (linguist) =

Linguist

Lisa Lai-shen Cheng
- Education: MIT
- Known for: syntax-semantics interface, syntax-prosody interface, syntax-processing interface, Chinese languages, Bantu languages
- Spouse: Rint Sybesma
- Scientific career
- Fields: Linguistics
- Workplaces: Leiden University
- Doctoral advisor: Noam Chomsky

Lisa Lai-Shen Cheng (simplified Chinese: 郑礼珊; traditional Chinese: 鄭禮珊; pinyin: Zhèng Lǐshān; born 1962) is a linguist with specialisation in theoretical syntax. She is a Chair Professor of Linguistics and Language at the Department of Linguistics, Leiden University, and one of the founding members of the Leiden Institute for Brain and Cognition.

== Academic life ==
After completing her BA and MA degree at the University of Toronto, Cheng obtained her PhD in 1991 at the Massachusetts Institute of Technology, where she studied with Noam Chomsky. From 1991 to 2000, she held a position at the University of California, Irvine, first as an assistant professor, then as an associate professor (with tenure), before moving to Leiden University. In 2012, she was nominated for the Regional Chair at the University of Nantes (France), where she was appointed for two years and lectured on East Asian Linguistics.

Cheng has done extensive work on theoretical syntax, mostly from a comparative perspective, with the majority of her work concentrating on Chinese languages (Mandarin, Cantonese, Wu, and Min) and Bantu languages (Zulu, Chichewa, Bemba). Important contributions of her work to syntactic theory include her “Clause Typing Hypothesis” (Cheng 1991), which led to a better understanding of the nature of triggers of operations in syntax and the role that sentence-final particles play in the triggering system. Her work on bare nouns and classifiers in Chinese languages (e.g., Cheng & Sybesma 1999) demonstrates that the count-mass distinction is also relevant in Chinese languages, albeit in the system of classifiers. Furthermore, this work has argued that bare nouns can have hidden structures, and that classifiers can be associated with definiteness. Cheng's joint work on Zulu with Laura J. Downing (Cheng & Downing 2009, 2016) is a rare example of collaboration between a syntactician and a phonologist, demonstrating the necessity as well as benefits of such collaboration to the field. Importantly, it shows that prosodic phrasing in a language provides evidence for the syntactic structure of the language, work that she has continued in investigating Mandarin (Gryllia et al. 2020).

== Honors and distinctions ==
Cheng was elected a member of Academia Europaea in 2016. In 2017 she was elected a member of the Royal Netherlands Academy of Arts and Sciences. In 2024, she was elected as a Fellow of the Linguistic Society of America.

Cheng has served on the editorial board of many leading journals in linguistics. She is an advisory editor of Linguistic Inquiry, and an associate editor of Language, and is on the editorial board of Journal of East Asian Linguistics, Contemporary Chinese Linguistics, Syntax: Journal of Theoretical, Experimental and Interdisciplinary Research, and The Linguistic Review.

She was the Editor of Glot International between 1996 and 2003. (See, e.g., Cheng & Sybesma, eds., 2000.)

== Selected publications ==
- Cheng, Lisa L. S. (1991). On the typology of wh-questions (Thesis thesis). Massachusetts Institute of Technology.
- Cheng, Lisa L.-S., and Rint Sybesma. 1999. Bare and not-so-Bare Nouns and the Structure of NP. Linguistic Inquiry 30.4: 509–542.
- The First Glot International State-of-the-Article Book: The Latest in Linguistics. De Gruyter Mouton. 2014-10-09. doi:10.1515/9783110822861 ISBN 978-3-11-082286-1
- Cheng, Lisa L.-S. and John Rooryck. 2002. Licensing Wh-in-situ. Syntax 3: 1–19.
- Kula, Nancy and Lisa L.-S. Cheng. 2007. Phonological and Syntactic Phrasing in Bemba Relatives. Journal of African Languages and Linguistics 28.2: 123–148.
- Cheng, Lisa L.-S. 2009. Wh-in-situ from the 1980s to Now. Language and Linguistics Compass 3.3: 767-791.
- Cheng, Lisa L.-S. and Laura Downing. 2009. Where is the Topic in Zulu? The Linguistic Review 26: 207–238.
- Cheng, Lisa L.-S., Jenny Doetjes, Rint Sybesma and Roberto Zamparelli. 2012. On the Interpretation of Number and Classifiers. Rivista di Linguistica 24.2: 175–194. (Special Issue: The Structure and Interpretation of Nouns and Noun Phrases, Part II).
- Cheng, Lisa L.-S. and Laura Downing. 2016. Phasal Syntax = Cyclic Phonology? Syntax 19.2:156-191. doi:10.1111/synt.12120
- Bonet, Eulàlia, Lisa L.-S. Cheng, Laura Downing and Joan Mascaró. 2019. (In)Direct ref-erence in the phonology-syntax interface under phase theory: a response to Modular PIC. Linguistic Inquiry 50.4: 751–777. doi:10.1162/ling_a_00324
- Gryllia, Stella, Doetjes, Jenny, Yang, Yang, and Lisa L.-S. Cheng. 2020. Prosody, clause typing, and wh-in-situ: Evidence from Mandarin. Laboratory Phonology: Journal of the Association for Laboratory Phonology 11(1): 19, pp. 1–30. doi:10.5334/labphon.169
