= Ikoma language =

Bantu language of Tanzania

Ikoma
- Ikoma-Nata-Isenye
- Native to: Tanzania
- Region: Mara Region
- Ethnicity: Ikoma people, Nata, Isenye
- Native speakers: 36,000 (2005)
- Language family: Niger–Congo?: Atlantic–Congo; Volta-Congo; Benue–Congo; Bantoid; Southern Bantoid; Bantu; Northeast Bantu; Great Lakes Bantu; East Nyanza; Nyanza Mara; Ikoma

Language codes
- ISO 639-3: ntk
- Glottolog: ikom1247
- Guthrie code: JE.45
- ELP: Ikoma

Ikoma, Nata, and Isenye are the ethnic names for a Bantu language of Tanzania.

== Writing system ==
Ikoma alphabet
| a | bh | ch | e | ë | gh | h | i | k | m | n | ng’ | ny | o | ö | r | s | sh | t | u | w | y |
