= Hunde people =

Hunde
BaHunde (Kobi, Rukobi)
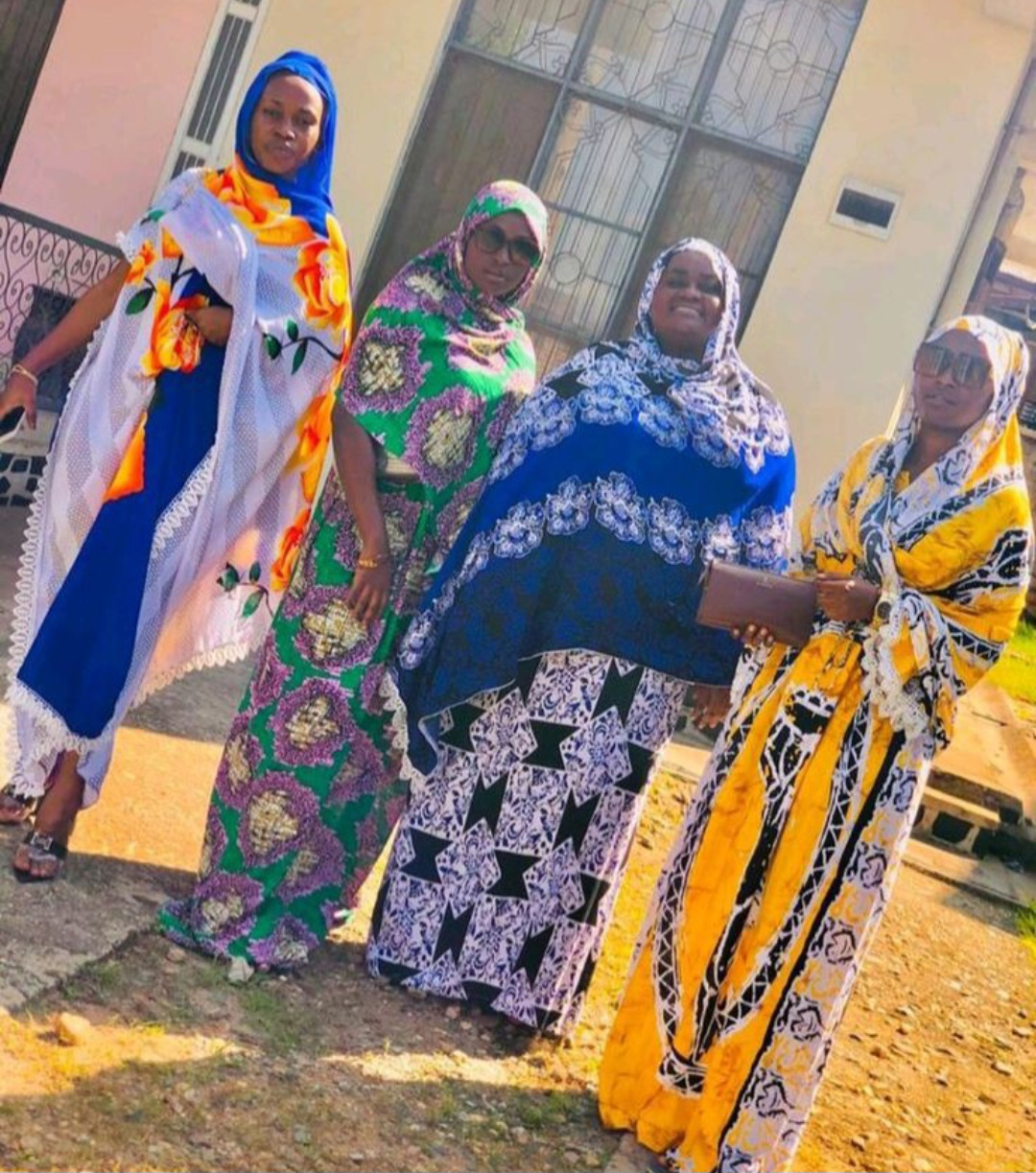

Total population
- over 1 million

Regions with significant populations
- North Kivu DRC, South Kivu DRC, Western Uganda

Languages
- Kihunde, Kiswahili

Religion
- Bantu spirituality, Christianity, Islam

Related ethnic groups
- Nyanga, Tembo, Nande, Toro, Kiga, Komo and other Bantu people

- Person: Muhunde/Kobi
- People: Bahunde/Kobi
- Language: Kihunde/Rukobi
- Country: Buhunde

The Hunde people also (BaHunde, MuHunde(plural), Kobi, Rukobi) are descendants of Bantu people primarily inhabiting the Kivu region of the Democratic Republic of the Congo. Many live in the Masisi Territory, Rutshuru Territory and Walikale Territory, where they make the majority and Indigenous population. Some Bahunde also live in Rwanda and southwestern Uganda, due to conflicts and economic migrations. They number approximately 950,000 and speak the Hunde language.

Among the massive capture of Bantu speaking people, many of the Bahunde were captured and sold during the Arab slavery of Africans, many more were also captured by the Portuguese and shipped during the transatlantic slavery, and with the coming of the European coloniser, the Bahunde Kingdom was reduced to chiefdoms and forced to convert to Christianity and Islam after a decade of resistance and resilience. The Bahunde have been in conflict with the Banyarwanda of Rwanda many times long before independence, in particular with the Tutsi; a Bantu tribe with cushitic or nilotic ancestry in Rwanda, Burundi and Uganda, many Bantu kingdoms in this region.

== History ==
According to ethnographic and oral historical studies by the Belgian anthropologist Daniel P. Biebuyck, particularly in his 1957 field notes and his later publication The BaHunde of Masisi Territoire (2019), the Hunde trace their origin to the ancient Bunyoro–Kitara Kingdom of present-day Uganda. Their founding ancestor, Kinyungu, was a royal prince of the Babiito dynasty and the son of King Ruhaga (also known as Ruhaga Kazana) of Bunyoro. After the assassination of Ruhaga by his brother Nihanika, Kinyungu fled westward across the Semliki River with seven noble companions—Balindi, Shamumbo, Kizizi, Bulolo, Musinga, Kiguruma, and Morinda.

The group first settled near Katwe and later moved deeper into the Congo Basin, conquering and integrating local populations in regions such as Luhofu, Bwito, and Masisi. These migrations led to the foundation of the early Hunde chiefdoms (chefferies), each ruled by descendants of Kinyungu or his companions. This history connects the Hunde directly to the royal Babiito lineage of Bunyoro and Tooro, who were themselves of Luo-Bito ancestry. As such, the Bahunde are considered a western offshoot of the Babiito royal clan of the Kitara empire, linking them culturally and historically to the ancient kingdoms of the Great Lakes region.

Hunde society is organised around hereditary chiefdoms led by a mwami (king or chief), who holds both political and sacred authority. Each chiefdom is subdivided into clans (bisasa), tracing descent from the early companions of Kinyungu. Key subdivisions include the Bashali, Banyungu, Banya-Bwito, and Bukumu (the latter occupying the Nyiragongo Territory). The mwami is assisted by a council of elders (bakungu), and sacred regalia such as drums, spears, and ritual staffs symbolize continuity with the ancient kings of Bunyoro.

Linguistically, the Hunde speak Kihunde, a Great Lakes Bantu language closely related to Runyoro, Kinande, Kinyanga, Rukonjo, and Kitembo, indicating a common ancestral origin in the Bunyoro–Kitara cultural sphere. Ethnographically, the Nyanga and Bukumu peoples are regarded as culturally and historically related branches of the Hunde, sharing clan systems, origin traditions, and rituals of kingship.

Economically, the Hunde are traditionally agriculturalists and herders, cultivating bananas, beans, maize, and sorghum, and raising cattle and goats. Ancestor veneration (bazimu) remains central to their spirituality, emphasizing family protection, fertility, and land blessings. The Bahunde regard themselves as the autochthonous population of the Masisi–Rutshuru–Nyiragongo highlands, preserving their language and customs despite waves of migration and conflict in eastern Congo.
