= Great Lakes Bantu languages =

Group of Bantu languages of East Africa

Great Lakes Bantu
- Bantu zone J
- Geographic distribution: Uganda, Rwanda, Burundi, Tanzania, Kenya and the DRC
- Linguistic classification: Niger–Congo?: Atlantic–Congo; Volta-Congo; Benue–Congo; Bantoid; Southern Bantoid; Bantu; Northeast Bantu; Great Lakes Bantu
- Proto-language: Proto-Great Lakes Bantu
- Subdivisions: East Nyanza; Greater Luyia; Gungu; Western Lakes Bantu; West Nyanza

Language codes
- Glottolog: grea1289

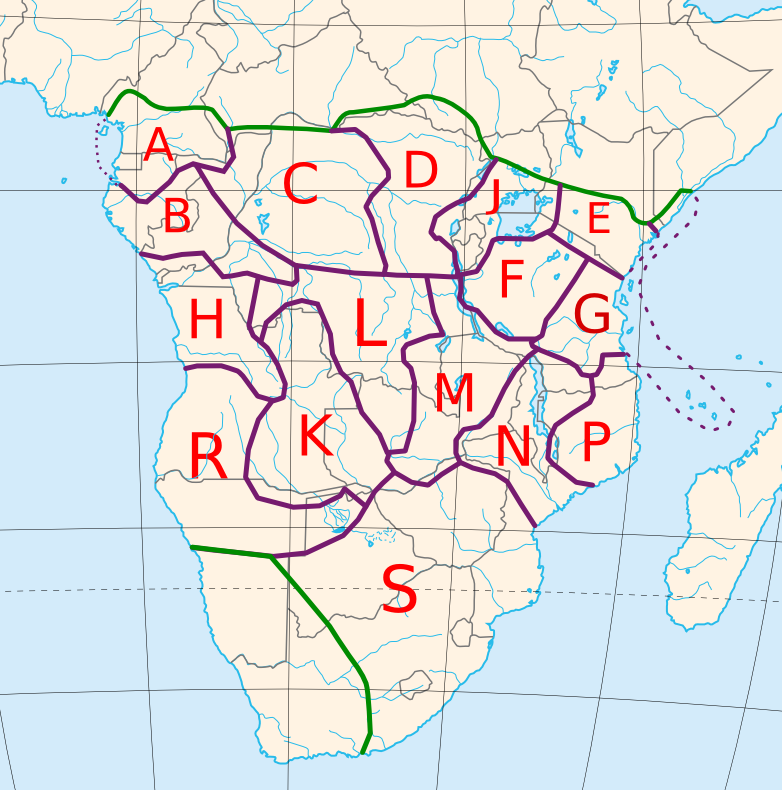

The Great Lakes Bantu languages, also known as Lacustrine Bantu and Bantu zone J, are a group of Bantu languages of East Africa. They were recognized as a group by the Tervuren team, who posited them as an additional zone (zone J) to Guthrie's largely geographic classification of Bantu.

== History ==
By 500 BC, Proto-Great Lakes Bantu speakers initially settled between Lakes Kivu and Rweru in Rwanda.

== Languages ==
The languages are, according to Bastin, Coupez, & Mann (1999), with Sumbwa added per Nurse (2003):

- Gungu (E10)
- Bwari (Kabwari) (D50)
- Konzo (D40): Konjo, Nande, ? Kobo
- Shi–Havu (D50): Hunde, Havu, Shi, Tembo, Nyindu, Fuliiru
- Rwanda-Rundi (D60): Kinyarwanda, Kirundi, Shubi, Hangaza, Ha, Vinza
- Nyoro–Ganda (E10): Ganda, Nyankore, Nyoro, Tooro, Hema, Chiga, Soga, Gwere, West Nyala, Ruli

(See also Rutara languages, Runyakitara language, Nkore-Kiga)

- Haya–Jita (E20): Haya–Rashi, Talinga-Bwisi, Zinza, Kerebe (Kerewe), Jita–Kara–Kwaya–Ruri, Nyambo, Subi
- Masaba–Luhya (E30): Masaba (incl. Bukusu), Luhya proper, Nyore (or Nyole in Kenya), Nyole (or Olunyole in Uganda), Samia–Songa, Marachi, Khayo
- Logooli–Kuria (E40): Logooli (Luhya), Ngurimi, Ikizu–Sizaki/Shashi, Suba, Suba-Simbiti, Kabwa, Singa, Idaxo-Isuxa-Tiriki (Luhya), Gusii (Kisii), Kuria (Simbiti, Hacha, Surwa, Sweta), Zanaki, Ikoma,?Ware
- Sumbwa (F20)

The codes in parentheses are Guthrie's original geographic classification.

Maho (2009) adds Yaka. Kobo was recognized later. It's said to be about equidistant between Nande and Hunde, so it's not clear where it should be in the tree above.

Glottolog separates Nyole in Uganda (and its dialects: Hadyo or Luhadyo, Menya, Sabi or Lusabi, and Wesa or Luwesa) from the E30 group (Masaba-Luhya) into an unclassified subgroup within a "Greater Luyia" group containing the Logoo-Kuria (E40) group. Besides this, it does not consider this older geographic classification relevant for its ongoing classification based on more recent linguistic studies, and uses four different subgroups (Greater Luyia, West Nyanza, East Nyanza, and Western Lakes Bantu), keeping Gungu (E10) separate from them.
