= Kuria language =

Bantu language spoken in Tanzania and Kenya

Kuria
- Igikuria
- Native to: Kenya, Tanzania
- Ethnicity: Kuria people
- Native speakers: 690,000 (2005–2009)
- Language family: Niger–Congo?: Atlantic–Congo; Volta-Congo; Benue–Congo; Bantoid; Southern Bantoid; Bantu; Northeast Bantu; Great Lakes Bantu; Logooli–Kuria (E.40); Kuria
- Dialects: Kuria proper; Simbiti; Hacha; Surwa; Sweta
- Writing system: Latin, Arabic

Language codes
- ISO 639-3: kuj
- Glottolog: kuri1259
- Guthrie code: JE.43,431–434

Kuria is a Bantu language spoken by the Kuria people of Northern Tanzania, with some speakers also residing in Kenya.

Maho (2009) treats the Simbiti, Hacha, Surwa, and Sweta varieties as distinct languages.

== Phonology ==
=== Consonants ===
Kuria consonant phonemes
	Bilabial	Alveolar	Palatal	Velar	Glottal
Nasal	m	n	ɲ	ŋ	
Prenasalized plosive	ᵐb	ⁿd		ᵑg	
Plosive/affricate		t	t͡ʃ	k	
Fricative	β	s		ɣ	h
Approximant			j		
Tap/flap		ɾ			
Trill		r			

=== Vowels ===
Kuria vowels
	Front		Back	
	+ATR	-ATR	+ATR	-ATR
Close	i		u	
Mid	e	ɛ	o	ɔ
Open	a			

All vowels contrast length, and can be either short or long.

== Alphabet ==
	Kuria alphabet (Kenya)																						
Uppercase	A	B	Ch	E	Ë	G	H	I	K	M	N	Nd	Ny	Ng'	O	Ö	R	Rr	S	T	U	W	Y
Lowercase	a	b	ch	e	ë	g	h	i	k	m	n	nd	ny	ng'	o	ö	r	rr	s	t	u	w	y
IPA Symbol	a	β	t͡ʃ	e	ɛ	ɣ	h	i	k	m	n	n͡d	ɲ	ŋ	o	ɔ	ɾ	r	s	t	u	w	j

== Bibliography ==
- Jelle Cammenga, Igikuria phonology and morphology : a Bantu language of South-West Kenya and North-West Tanzania, Köppe, Köln, 2004, 351 p. ISBN 3896450298 (revised text of a thesis)
- S. M. Muniko, B. Muita oMagige and M. J. Ruel (ed.), Kuria-English dictionary, LIT, Hambourg, 1996, 137 p. ISBN 3825829510
- W. H. Whiteley, The structure of the Kuria verbal and its position in the sentence, University of London, 1955, 161 p. (thesis)
- Phebe Yoder, Tata na Baba = Father and Mother : a first Kuria reader, Musoma Press, Musoma, Tanganyika, 1949, 44 p.
