= Suba-Simbiti language =

Bantu language of Tanzania

Suba-Simbiti
- Native to: Tanzania
- Region: Mara Region
- Native speakers: 110,000 (2011)
- Language family: Niger–Congo?: Atlantic–Congo; Volta-Congo; Benue–Congo; Bantoid; Southern Bantoid; Bantu; Northeast Bantu; Great Lakes Bantu; East Nyanza; Nyanza Mara; Suba-Simbiti

Language codes
- ISO 639-3: ssc
- Glottolog: suba1252
- Guthrie code: JE.403 (shared w Kenyan Suba)

Suba-Simbiti (Kisuba, Kisimbiti) is a Bantu language of Tanzania. Suba-Simbiti is spoken by six groups in the Tarime region of Tanzania. This include Hacha, Kine, Sweta, Simbiti and Kiroba. The total number of speakers is in the region of 110,000.

== Phonology ==
Simbiti has a seven-vowel system with the vowels /i e ɛ a ɔ o u/ attested. However, only the five vowels / i ɛ a ɔ u / are found in verb roots.

== Grammar ==
Simbiti has a basic SVO word order and head-initial syntax. The language has 19 noun classes, including two locative classes.

There are three past tenses: a recent past, distant past and a general past. There is also a three-way distinction in the future: immediate future, a hodiernal future (used for events that will take place later the same day) and a distant future tense for events that will take place after today. Simbiti uses a range of simple and complex verb forms to encode a wide range of specific tense-aspect combinations. The progressive verb forms (past progressive, present progressive and future progressive) are all formed through the use of compound, auxiliary-based constructions, with the past progressive and the present progressive both exhibiting verb-auxiliary order.

Simbiti is one of a small set of East African Bantu languages that exhibit verb-auxiliary constituent order in restricted contexts. In Simbiti, the auxiliary appears after the verb in the past progressive and the present progressive tenses.
