= Nurse Education Today =

Academic journal

- Discipline: Nursing
- Language: English

Publication details
- History: 1981–present
- Publisher: Elsevier

Standard abbreviations
- ISO 4: Nurse Educ. Today

Links
- Journal homepage

Nurse Education Today is a peer-reviewed nursing journal covering nursing, midwifery, and healthcare education published by Elsevier. It was established in 1981 and its editor-in-chief is Amanda Kenny. Previous editors were Jean Walker, Peter Birchenall, Martin Johnson and William Lauder.

== Abstracting and indexing ==
The journal is abstracted and indexed in:

- Scopus
- MEDLINE/PubMed
- Current Contents/Life Sciences
- Current Contents/Social and Behavioral Sciences
- CINAHL
- Referativnyi Zhurnal

According to the Journal Citation Reports, the journal has a 2021 impact factor of 3.906.
