= Larry Hyman =

American linguist (born 1947)

- Born: September 26, 1947 (age 79); Los Angeles, California, U.S.
- Occupations: Linguist; professor

Academic background
- Education: University of California, Los Angeles (B.S., M.A., Ph.D.)
- Website: linguistics.berkeley.edu/~hyman

Larry M. Hyman (born September 26, 1947) is an American linguist and Distinguished Professor Emeritus of Linguistics at the University of California, Berkeley. He specializes in phonology and has particular interest in African languages.

== Education and career ==
He received his B.S., M.A, and Ph.D. degrees from the University of California, Los Angeles. His 1972 Ph.D. dissertation, "A Phonological Study of Fe’fe’-Bamileke," was supervised by Victoria Fromkin.

Hyman taught at the University of Southern California from 1971 to 1988. There he edited and contributed to many volumes in the Southern California Occasional Papers in Linguistics (SCOPIL) series. He took up a position in UC-Berkeley's Department of Linguistics in 1988, where he served as chair of the department from 1991 to 2002. He remained at Berkeley until his retirement in 2022.

Hyman's widely cited and influential research focuses on phonological theory, language typology, and African languages, particularly Bantu languages and other Niger-Congo languages.

He has received numerous grants for his research, mostly from the National Science Foundation. In addition, he received a Guggenheim Fellowship in 1979.

== Honors and awards ==
Hyman was the President of the Linguistic Society of America (LSA) in 2017 and delivered his presidential address on "What tone teaches us about language". He is also a Fellow of the LSA and served on the LSA Executive Committee from 2003-2005. He received the Victoria A. Fromkin Lifetime Service Award from the LSA in 2021.

He became a Chevalier (Knight) of the prestigious Ordre des Palmes Académiques in 2021. This award honors Hyman's longtime commitment to educational exchanges and cooperative academic projects between France and the University of California, notably as Director of the France-Berkeley Fund. In 2004 he was awarded the Collège de France medal.

A Festschrift in his honor, Revealing Structure, was published by the University of Chicago Press in 2018.

He has been chair of the Editorial Board, University of California Publications in Linguistics since 1999. He has been editor or on the editorial board of many linguistic journals, including Linguistic Inquiry, Journal of African Languages & Linguistics, Language, Natural Language and Linguistic Theory, Lingua Descriptive Series, Phonology (Yearbook), Linguistic Typology and Africana Linguistica (Musée royal de l'Afrique central).

== Selected publications ==
- Phonology: Theory and Analysis (1975)
- "Why describe African languages?" In A. Akinlabi & O. Adesola (eds.) Proceedings of the 4th World Congress of African Linguistics, New Brunswick 2003, 21–42. Cologne: Rüdiger Köppe Verlag, 2005.
- "The word in Luganda". In F.K. Erhard Voeltz (ed.), Studies in African linguistic typology, 171–193. John Benjamins, 2005 (with Francis Katamba).
- "Word-prosodic typology". Phonology 23.225–257, 2006.
- "On the representation of tone in Peñoles Mixtec". International Journal of American Linguistics 73.165–208, 2007 (with John P. Daly).
- "Where’s phonology in typology?" Linguistic Typology 11.265–271, 2007.
- "Niger-Congo verb extensions: Overview and discussion". In Doris L. Payne and Jaime Peña (eds), Selected Proceedings of the 37th Annual Conference on African Linguistics, 149–163. Sommerville, MA: Cascadilla Proceedings Project, 2007.
- "Elicitation as experimental phonology: Thlantlang Lai tonology". In Maria-Josep Solé, Pam Beddor & Manjari Ohala (eds), Experimental Approaches to Phonology in Honor of John J. Ohala, 7–24. Oxford University Press, 2007.
- "Directional asymmetries in the morphology and phonology of words, with special reference to Bantu." In Linguistics 46.2 (2008).
- "Universals in phonology". In The Linguistic Review, 2008.
- "Focus in Aghem". In Proceedings of the International Conference on Information Structure, Potsdam, June 6–8, 2006 (with Maria Polinsky).
- Prosodic morphology and tone: the case of Chichewa. In Harry van der Hulst, René Kager & Wim Zonneveld, eds., The prosody-morphology interface, 90-133. Cambridge: Cambridge University Press, 1999. (with Al Mtenje)
- A theory of phonological weight. Mouton. 1985. ISBN 9783110130775
