= Hunde language =

Language

Hunde
- Kihunde
- Native to: Democratic Republic of Congo
- Ethnicity: Hunde people
- Native speakers: (200,000 cited 1980)
- Language family: Niger–Congo?: Atlantic–Congo; Benue–Congo; Bantoid; Bantu; Northeast Bantu; Great Lakes Bantu; Shi–Havu; Hunde

Language codes
- ISO 639-3: hke
- Glottolog: hund1239
- Guthrie code: JD.51

Hunde (Kihunde; also Luhunde, Kobi, Rukobi) is a Great Lakes Bantu language spoken by the Hunde people in Nord-Kivu province in the Democratic Republic of the Congo.

== Geographic distribution ==
It is primarily spoken in the territories of Masisi, Rutshuru, Walikale and Nyiragongo.

Hunde has significant lexical overlap with Shi (Mashi, Amashi).

== Phonology ==
Hunde is a tonal language, with register tone.
