= Mfangano Island =

Island in Kenya

Coordinates: 0°28′S 34°01′E

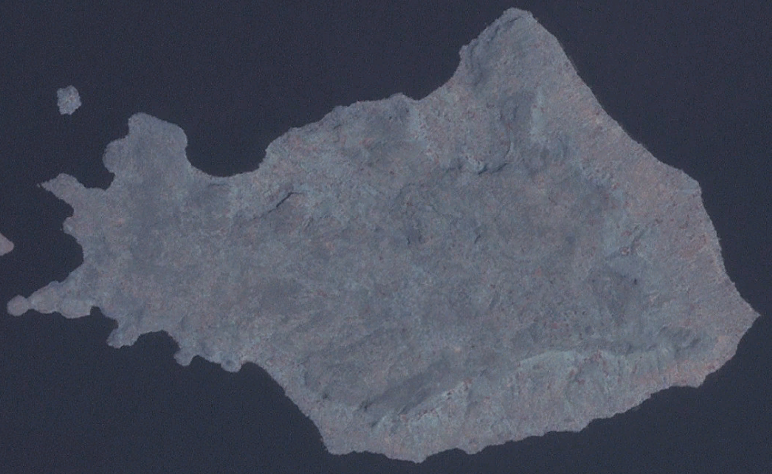
Satellite image of Mfangano

Mfangano Island lies in the eastern part of Lake Victoria, at the mouth of the Winam Gulf. Part of Kenya, it lies west of Rusinga Island. The island is 65 km^{2} in area and rises to 1,694 m at Mount Kwitutu. It had a population of 16,282 at the 1999 census. As of 2024, the population is estimated to be approximately 30,000. Administratively, Mfangano is part of Homa Bay County.

The island is home to the largest population of Olusuba or Suba people language speakers in Kenya. Olusuba is becoming rarer, in part because of intermarriage between Suba men and Luo women from the mainland, as it is traditional for children to learn the "mother tongue", that is, the language of their mother. Other languages spoken on the island include Luo, Swahili, and English. Members of the Luo tribe are concentrated on the eastern side of the island, most of whom are fishermen and subsistence farmers. Some of the inhabitants of Mfangano are believed to be descendants of emigrants from the Buganda kingdom in Uganda who arrived after the controversial early nineteenth century killing of the kabaka juju.

Most inhabitants live near the water for ease in fishing and collecting the day's water supply. The water's edge of the island is quite rocky with a few black sandy shores. Transportation consists mostly walking and of boat travel in small wooden handmade boats that sometimes have a sail. There are a few bicycles now that the government cut a road that circles the island on which motorbikes can travel. The first car to be driven on the island's soil was on February 2, 2007. It was driven 500 m. In it was Road and Public Services Hon. Simeon Nyachae, MP. Since then, several automobiles have been seen, and others now are used locally for transport. There is a small dirt landing strip for small planes which has been improved to support other bigger planes. This is used mostly for tourists and mission workers.

Apart from the above-mentioned, the government has also worked hard and ensured that there is constant electricity supply within the island by use of the generators hence this has seen growth within the region and improvement on the economic ability of the island as fishermen can now store their fish as they wait for the market.

Many more will be able to experience the region with the improving tourism rate boosted by the establishment of the Abasuba Community Peace Museum in October 2009.

Mfangano is also known for its ancient rock art, possibly 2,000 years old and thought to have been created by early forager-hunters, perhaps a Twa people.

== Sources ==
- Ogone John Obiero. 2010. A Case of a Mother Tongue and Another Mother Tongue in School: Efforts at Revitalization of Olosuba Language in Kenya. Journal of Third World Studies vol. 27, no. 2, pp. 227–350.
