= Mwalimu Nyerere University =

Agricultural university in Butiama, Tanzania

Mwalimu Nyerere University (MNU)
- Motto: Pursuing Excellence
- Type: Public
- Established: 2007
- Vice-Chancellor: Lesakit S. Mellau
- Location: Butiama, Tanzania; 01°47′54″S 33°58′25″E
- Campus: Rural
- Website: www.mjnuat.ac.tz
- Location in Tanzania

Mwalimu Nyerere University (MJNUAT), whose complete name is Mwalimu Julius Kambarage Nyerere University of Agriculture and Technology (MJNUAT), is a public university in Tanzania. MJNUAT focuses on the instruction of agricultural sciences, agricultural mechanization, and agribusiness.

== Location ==
MNU maintains its main campus in the town of Butiama, Butiama District, Mara Region, in northern Tanzania, the birthplace of Julius Kambarage Nyerere (13 April 1922 – 14 October 1999), the founder president of modern-day Tanzania, who served as president of that country between 1964 until 1985.

The university's main campus, which is under development, will occupy 573.5 hectares (2.214 sq mi), approximately 50.5 kilometres (31 mi) southeast of Musoma, the regional headquarters and nearest large city. This is about 50 kilometres (31 mi), northeast of Bunda, the headquarters of neighboring Bunda District.

The geographical coordinates of the main campus of Mwalimu Julius Kambarage Nyerere University of Agriculture and Technology are: 01°47'54.0"S, 33°58'25.0"E (Latitude:-1.798333; Longitude:33.973611).

== University campuses ==
The campuses of MNU include the following:

- Main campus in Butiama.
- Other satellite campuses are planned at other locations in Mara Region of Tanzania.

== History ==
In 2015, after the decision to establish MNU had been made, an agreement was signed between the Ministry of Education and Vocational Training and China Civil Engineering Construction Corporation for the construction of the main campus of the university. At that time, the actual cost was unknown, pending a feasibility study.

Following the conclusion of an Environmental impact assessment, a Social impact assessment, a physical master plan and the acquisition of 573.5 hectares (1,417 acres) of land, construction is expected to start in 2022, using US$44.5 million (TZS:105 billion), availed by the Government of Tanzania.

Construction of this institution received partial funding from the World Bank Group.

== See also ==
- Agriculture in Tanzania
- Education in Tanzania
- List of universities in Tanzania
