= Manchira Dam =

Dam in Tanzania

Coordinates: 1.833333°S 34.666667°E

Manchira Dam is a dam in the Serengeti District, Mara Region of Tanzania. The aim of the project is to supply enough safe and clean water to the residents of Mugumu township and the neighbouring villages of Kebosongo, Rwamchanga, Morotonga, Bwitengi, Kisangura and Matare.

== History ==
Construction of Manchira Dam began in 1980.

The project was at first estimated to cost TZS 32m/-. The Tanzanian Government has so far spent TZS 2.4bn/-.

The Minister for Water, Stephen Wassira, stated that the government would do its best to get TZS 2.2bn/- for the completion of the dam within the next five years.

On 2 July 2010, the president of Tanzania, Jakaya Kikwete officially inaugurated the dam. The project took 30 years to be completed and cost the nation over TZS10bn.
