= RVR =

RVR may refer to:

== Places ==
- Rashtreeya Vidyalaya Road metro station (Namma Metro station code RVR), Karnataka, India; a train station
- Richmond Staples Mill Road station (Amtrak station code RVR), Henrico County, Virginia, U.S.; a train station
- Green River Municipal Airport (IATA airport code RVR), Emory County, Utah, USA
- José Aponte de la Torre Airport (FAA airport code RVR), Ceiba, Puerto Rico

== Railways, railroads ==
- Richmond Vale Railway, New South Wales, Australia; a collier railway
- Rift Valley Railways, in Kenya and Uganda
- Rockaway Valley Railroad, New Jersey, USA; a disused short line
- Rother Valley Railway, England, UK; a heritage line
- Ruhr Valley Railway (German: Regionalverband Ruhr), North Rhine - Westphalia, Germany; an abandoned line

== Groups, organizations, companies ==
- RVR (restaurant), Los Angeles, California, USA; a Japanese restaurant
- Council for Broadcasting and Retransmission (Slovak: RVR), a regulatory authority for mass media in Slovakia
- Rapid Ventricular Rate, a medical abbreviation
- Raven Air (ICAO airline code RVR), UK; see List of airline codes (R)
- Rīgas Vagonbūves Rūpnīca, a former Latvian rail and tram vehicle manufacturer
- RVR Riga (Rīgas Vagonbūves Rūpnīca), a Latvian football club in the 1956 Latvian SSR Higher League
- RVR (Rīgas Vagonbūves Rūpnīca), a Latvian ice hockey club; see ice hockey in Latvia
- Rift Valley Resources, a minerals exploration company in Tanzania
- Royal Victoria Regiment, an infantry regiment of the Australian Army
- Ruhr Regional Association (RVR, German: Regionalverband Ruhr), Germany

== Other uses ==
- R v R, a 1991 House of Lords case that determined that under English criminal law, it is a crime for a husband to rape his wife
- Mitsubishi RVR, a range of cars
- Sphero RVR, a tracked toy robot
- Runway visual range, an aeronautical term
- Realm versus Realm, a type of player versus player gameplay
- rapid virological response; see Glossary of virology
