= Mark Bomani =

Tanzanian jurist

2nd Attorney General of Tanzania
- In office 1965–1976
- President: Julius Nyerere
- Preceded by: Roland Brown
- Succeeded by: Joseph Warioba

Personal details
- Born: 2 January 1932 Bunda Town, Bunda District, Mara Region, Tanganyika Territory
- Died: 10 September 2020 (aged 88)
- Party: CCM
- Education: Makerere University

Judge Mark Bomani (2 January 1932 – 10 September 2020) served as the second Attorney General of Tanzania from 1965 to 1976. Later he was a judge and ran a private law practice.

== Political History ==
Bomani was the Attorney General of Tanzania from 1965 to 1976 and was the first attorney general to be born in Tanzania. After serving in the government, he became a senior legal advisory in the United Nations between 1976 and 1990, working towards Namibian independence from South Africa and working to devise an independent legal system for the country.

Bomani had great international negotiation experience and was also the chief aide to both Julius Nyerere and Nelson Mandela on peace negotiations during the first Burundian Civil War.
