= Serengeti International Airport =

Proposed airport in Mara Region, Tanzania

Serengeti International Airport – Proposed airport –
- IATA: none; ICAO: HTST

Summary
- Airport type: Public
- Serves: Serengeti National Park
- Location: Mugumu, Mara, Tanzania
- Coordinates: 1°51′49″S 34°39′13″E

Map
- Proposed location of Serengeti airport. SIA (Africa) SIA (Earth)

Runways
Direction	Length		Surface
Direction	m	ft	Surface
TBD	3,800	12,467	Asphalt

Serengeti International Airport (SIA) (Swahili: Uwanja wa Ndege wa Kimataifa wa Serengeti) is a proposed international airport project located in Mara Region, Tanzania. The airport is intended to serve the Serengeti National Park.

== Background ==
At present the national park is served by a number of airstrips; Seronera being the busiest. Major airports near the park's proximity are Mwanza Airport (166 km to Ndabaka Gate), Arusha Airport (226 km) and Kilimanjaro International Airport (284 km). Therefore, in order to minimize the travel time and distance, the government has decided to construct an international airport 40 km outside the park's north-western precincts.

American investor Paul Tudor Jones has agreed to finance the project.

== Project ==
The airport will be located in the Uwanja wa Ndege ward of Mugumu town in Serengeti District, Mara Region in northern Tanzania. It will cost about US$350 million and is expected to boost the number of visitors from the present 0.8 to 1.6 million whilst also doubling the revenue to US$2.8 billion.

The length of the single runway is expected to be between 3,800 and 4,200 metres.

=== Proponents ===
- Former Prime Minister Edward Lowassa said that the plan to construct the airport, hotels and roads would proceed in spite of opposition. He insisted that the park had 940 hotel rooms compared to the Maasai Mara which had 4,700 despite being a sixth the size.
- Tanzania National Parks supports the project as it will reduce visitors' journey time to the park.
- Tanzania Civil Aviation Authority has approved the project.
- Prime Minister Mizengo Pinda

=== Opponents ===
Serengeti Watch, a nonprofit organization insists that its construction would negatively impact the future of the park.
