= Kirumi Bridge =

Kirumi Bridge Daraja la Kirumi (Swahili)
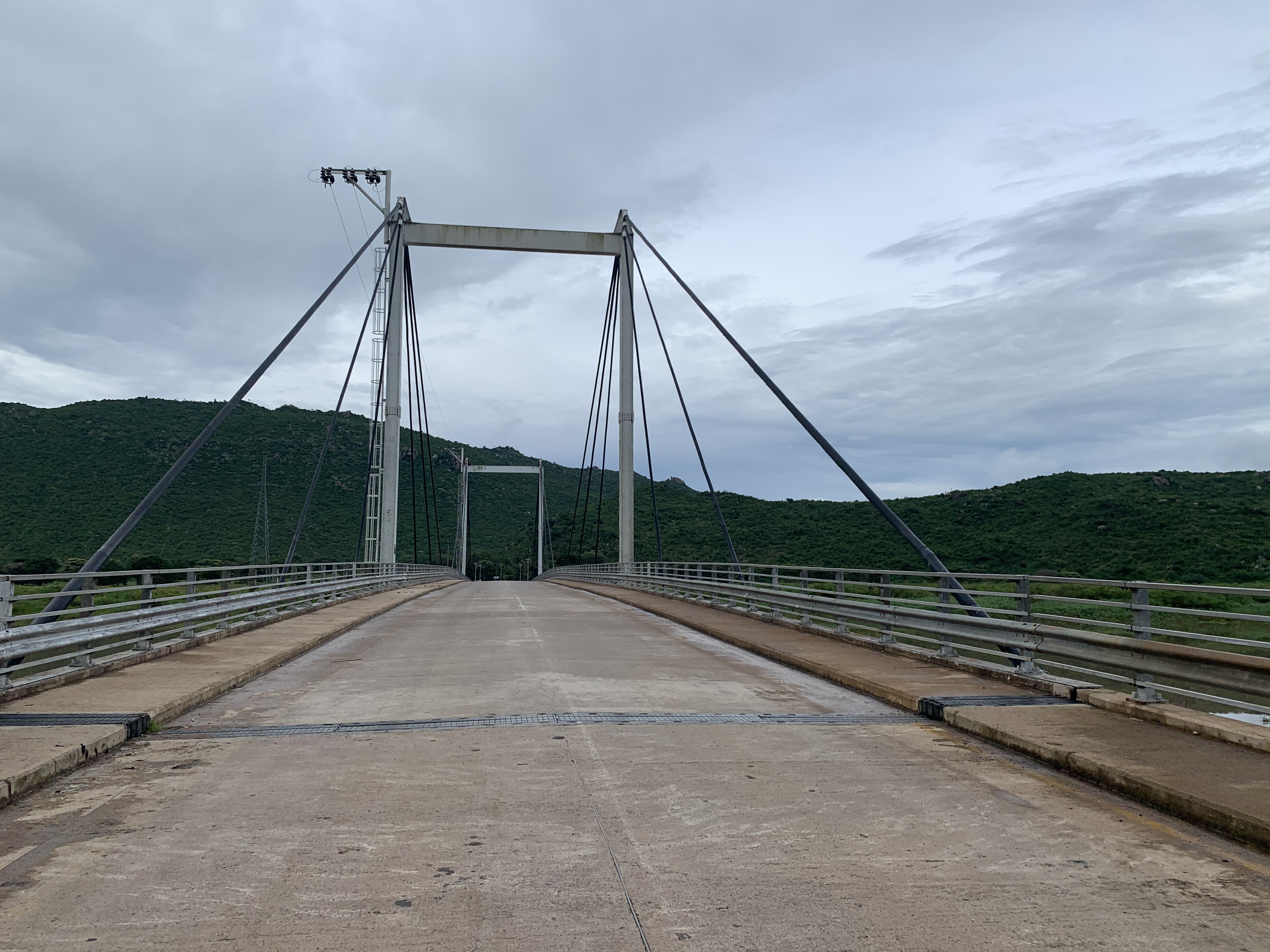
- Kirumi Bridge, Tanzania.
- Coordinates: 1°31′42.2″S 33°58′30.77″E
- Carries: T4 road (2 lanes)
- Crosses: Mara River
- Owner: Government of Tanzania

Characteristics
- Design: Cable-stayed bridge
- Total length: 223.3 metres (733 ft)
- No. of spans: 3

History
- Designer: COWIconsult
- Fabrication by: Cordioli & C Steel Construction S.p.A. (Italy)
- Construction start: 1980
- Construction cost: US$ 10 million
- Opened: November 1985
- Inaugurated: 14 October 1985

Kirumi Bridge is a cable-stayed bridge in northern Tanzania across the Mara River on the border of Butiama and Rorya Districts of Mara Region. Its construction was financed via a loan from the African Development Fund. It was inaugurated in October 1985 by Julius Nyerere, the country's first president.
