= Katherine Anne Taepke =

American nurse and Catholic missionary

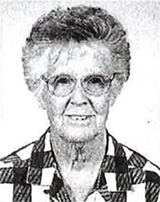

Katherine Anne Taepke (17 September 1921 – 28 February 2012) was an American nurse and Catholic missionary with the MaryKnoll Sisters, whose work contributed to the expansion of rural healthcare services in Tanzania. She was assigned to Tanganyika, where she directed hospitals, dispensaries, and clinics across the regions of Musoma, Shinyanga, Singida, and Mwanza, including facilities she helped establish in Massa, Sayusayu, and Mwamapalala.

Taepke's work in Tanzania included obstetrical care, maternal and child health coordination, clinic administration, and later AIDS ministry and community pastoral visitation. She remained in Tanzania until 2006 before returning to the Maryknoll Center in New York.

== Early life and education ==
Katherine Anne Taepke was born on 17 September 1921 in Detroit, Michigan, to Grace (Price) and Walter G. Taepke. She grew up in Annunciation Parish and attended Annunciation Parish Grammar and High School.

In 1939, Taepke enrolled in the nursing program at St. Joseph's Hospital in London, Ontario, receiving her Registered Nurse Certificate in 1942. She subsequently worked as an obstetric nurse in a small hospital and later as a medical assistant in a large private practice on Detroit's East Side.

Seeking additional clinical training, she completed a four-month postgraduate obstetrics course at the University of Chicago Lying-In Hospital in 1946 and later undertook part-time studies at the University of Detroit.

Taepke entered the MaryKnoll Sisters on 6 September 1950 after meeting a MaryKnoll sister who encouraged her to consider a missionary vocation. She stated that her life “changed when she was accepted as a Maryknoll postulant.” At her reception she received the name Sister Elizabeth Grace, which she used until after Vatican II. She professed First vows in 1953 and was assigned to the MaryKnoll tuberculosis sanatorium in Monrovia, California. A year after that, she did service at Queen of the World Hospital in Kansas City where she set up and managed the obstetrical clinic and supervised the hospital ward.

== Career ==
In 1957, Taepke was assigned to Tanganyika. She professed her Final vows in Africa in 1959. Her early work included service as a dispensary nurse at the Maryknoll dispensary in Rosana, where she contracted cerebral malaria. She later served in Nyegina beginning in 1962, and in 1963 she moved to Kowak, where she worked as hospital supervisor.

Beginning in 1964, Taepke served in Nassa and carried out clinic work. She was later placed in charge of the outpatient department and 20-bed maternity clinic in Sayusayu. From 1970 to 1986, she worked in Mwamapalala, where she founded and managed a rural clinic that became part of expanding diocesan health services in Shinyanga region.

Taepke returned to the United States in 1977 for renewal and later participated in mission promotion work. She later pursued further medical training in Ireland, earning a Midwifery Certificate from Lourdes Hospital in Drogheda to meet Tanzanian professional requirements.

Taepke returned to Tanzania and worked with the Medical Missionaries of Mary at the hospital in Makiungu (Singida) as Maternal and Child Health Coordinator. From 1984 to 1992, she moved to Bariadi, where she establish clinics, conducted dispensary work, taught Natural Family Planning, and took mobile clinics to rural communities.

From 1992 to 2001, she served in Mwanza, where her ministry focused on AIDS care and pastoral outreach. She then moved to Musoma (2002–2006) and engaged in pastoral visitation with small Christian communities, conducted AIDS-related home visits, and volunteering weekly at an orphanage caring for young children affected by HIV/AIDS. She described her work her service during this period as an effort to be "God's instrument" in both medical and spiritual care within local communities.

== Later life and legacy ==
Taepke returned to the Maryknolll Center in New York in 2006. Although retired, she continued participating in ministry within Residential Care IV until shortly before her death. She died on February 28, 2012, at Phelps Memorial Hospital in Sleepy Hollow, New York.

Her legacy in Tanzania includes the establishment and development of rural clinics in Shinyanga, Nassa, Sayusayu, and Mwamapalala, as well as the training of Tanzanian medical staff who later became self-reliant health workers. She is also remembered for her early involvement in AIDS ministry, her contributions to maternal and child health, and her longstanding commitment tot community-based pastoral care.
