= Rift Valley Resources =

Tanzanian mineral exploration company

Rift Valley Resources Limited is a mineral exploration company with tenements in highly prospective areas of Tanzania.

== About ==
Rift Valley Resources, through its wholly owned subsidiary, Rift Valley Resources (Tanzania) Limited, focuses on acquiring, exploring, and developing mineral deposits. It holds interests in 9 granted licenses and 7 licenses under application covering a total of approximately 1,183 square kilometers within geological provinces of Tanzania containing known deposits of gold, nickel, copper, and platinum group elements. The company was incorporated in 2010 and is based in Perth, Australia.

== Projects ==
Rift Valley Resources Ltd (RVR) holds interests within geological provinces of known gold, and nickel, copper, and platinum group element (PGE) endowment in Tanzania. These properties have potential for the discovery of commercial minerals; principally gold and nickel, in a number of geologic settings.

=== Gold Overview ===
The Nyanzian Supergroup rocks host the majority of known gold deposits in Tanzania and contain most of the greenstone belts found in the Tanzanian Craton. Granite rocks surrounding these greenstone belts are also known to host gold mineralisation and previous exploration and mining has been centred on these rocks. The Tanzanian Craton has many similarities to other globally-significant gold-producing cratons such as the Yilgarn craton in Western Australia, the Kaapvaal and Zimbabwe Cratons in Southern Africa, and the Superior Craton of the Canadian Shield.

RVR's gold projects are located within three geological regions which contain both greenstone and granite rocks. The first region is termed the “Lake Victoria domain”. It comprises the granite-greenstone belts immediately to the south of Lake Victoria.

The second is termed the “northern domain”. It comprises the granite-greenstone belts to the east of Lake Victoria and north of the town of Mwanza.

The third gold region is termed the “Southern domain” and is located over granite terrane south of the Kahama District.

=== Lake Victoria Domain ===
==== Kasubuya Project ====
The Kasubuya tenement is located within the central Lake Victorian goldfields region of Tanzania some 45 km EW of the Geita town site. It extends 3.7 km to the east and 7 km to the south for a total area of about 26 km².

The Kasubuya Project is hosted dominantly within granite directly south of the regionally and historically significant gold producing greenstone belt of the Geita goldfield south of Lake Victoria. The property is located at the eastern end of the Geita greenstone where it starts to trend to the south and then southeast due to doming of the greenstone sequence over the granitic intrusive. The most northeastern tip of the Kasubuya license encompasses some Upper Nyanzian Formation comprising well-exposed banded iron formation and felsic tuffs and poorly-exposed pillowed tholeiitic basalt lava and mafic tuffs typical of the Geita greenstone belt.

==== Chibango Project ====
The Chibango tenement is located within the central Lake Victorian goldfields region of Tanzania 10 km SW of the Geita town site and 6 km south of the Ridge 8 or Nyamulilima Hill gold deposit owned by AngloGold Ashanti. Access is via a sealed road that runs WSW from the town of Geita and crosses the extreme NW corner of the property at a distance of about 25 km. Topography is very hilly with thick native forests covering much of the property.

The Chibango Project is hosted wholly within granite directly south of the regionally- and historically-significant gold-producing greenstone belt of the Geita goldfield south of Lake Victoria. Despite strong topography, actual outcropping granite is rare and largely obscured by the dense vegetation. Significant fracturing consistent with regional structures known to control the mineralisation at Geita and other prospects of the greenstone belt can be identified from the interpretation of regional aerial magnetic images.

=== Northern Domain ===
==== Nyasiri Project ====
The Nyasiri tenement is located in northeast Tanzania within the historically productive Mara-Musoma Goldfield some 20 km SE of North Mara (Nyabirama) mine owned by Barrick Gold. The area is accessible by Tarime airstrip then a rough road going towards the Serengeti District; the tenement straddles the western border of the Serengeti National Park.

The Nyasiri Project is hosted dominantly within granite that contains two small inliers of greenstone rocks (1 to 2 km and 2 to 3 km in area) presumably of Nyanzian origin. The western quarter of the property is covered with Bukoban Proterozoic-age sediments which unconformably overlie the Archean granite/greenstone beneath. Intrusive Proterozoic-age ultrabasic rocks occur along the southern margin of the property. Their sub-surface distribution is likely to be extensive as a gravity anomaly associated with the ultrabasic lopolith intrusion covers a large portion of the Nyasiri property. The Keserya Hills Cr-Ni-PGE prospect occurs immediately south of the Nyasiri property and the ultramafic rocks which host this prospect trend into the Nyasiri tenement. These ultramafic rocks are considered prospective for massive or disseminated Ni-Cu-PGE sulphide mineralisation or strataform Ni-Cr-PGE mineralisation.

==== Buhemba South East Project ====
The Buhemba South tenement is located in north east Tanzania within the historically productive Mara-Musoma Goldfield some 9 km due southeast of its namesake township, Buhemba. Access is to the Sarama property along a local inter-village vehicular track. There is a track leading more directly to the town of Buhemba but it is in poor repair and difficult to follow. Local access on the property is generally poor and via village tracks and trails.

The tenement straddles the contact between granites and greenstone belt of the Mara-Musoma goldfield. Approximately two-thirds of the tenement is underlain by granitic rock types while the north western third comprises sub-cropping volcanics of mainly mafic to intermediate composition of the Nyanzian System. Twof granite occur in the southern third of the property but most of the granite is covered by extensive mbugu plains. The volcanic rocks outcrop as a NE-SW trending range of hills and about half of the 4 km of strike length is exposed within the property boundary. Structural interpretation of the magnetic and gravity geophysical data also confirms the location and strike of the Nyanzian System rocks. -

==== Sarama Project ====
The Sarama tenement is located in north east Tanzania within the Mara-Musoma Goldfield, 10 km due south of the township of Buhemba and 20 km east of the Suguti Project. Access is via the sealed Mwanza to Musoma highway up to the small township of Butiama, then via graded roads to the township of Buhemba and on to Sarama village located close to the northern boundary of the property. Internal access is good as the land is relatively flat with drainage typically towards the south. Sarama extends approximately 4.5 km to the east and 4 km to the south for a total area of about 18 km².

The tenement straddles the southern boundary of the Mara-Musoma greenstone belt with granites but the geology is largely covered by thin soils overlying sub-cropping residual laterites. The greenstones are most likely part of the Nyanzian System and the southern portion of the tenement is covered extensively by mbugu soils which are interpreted to overlie granite.

At least 4 km of ESE striking granite-greenstone contact has been identified from reconnaissance mapping. Structural interpretation of the magnetic and gravity geophysical data indicates a series of easterly trending structures parallel the main contact into the greenstone sequences. Mapping of artisanal workings within the northwest quadrant of the tenement identified a quartz vein up to 1m wide within an easterly striking shear zone dipping to the north at 40°. The vein is hosted by sheared mafic volcanics and had been excavated over an estimated distance of 100m.

==== Suguti Project ====
The Suguti tenement application is located in northeast Tanzania within the historically productive Mara-Musoma Goldfield 40 km south of the township of Musoma and 25 km west southwest from the township of Buhemba. Access is gained from the sealed Mwanza to Musoma highway which passes through the western edge of the property. Internal access to the project is good with a graded access road traversing the property from east to west. The southern portion of the property is mostly soil-covered cultivated-ground that drains to the southwest into the Suguti River and then into Lake Victoria. The northern half of the property comprises steep hills and ranges with moderate to strong rock outcrop and has very little human habitation or cultivation. General land use is seasonal crop farming and no landholder access issues have been identified that will prevent exploration activities. The prospecting license extends approximately 9.3 km to the east and 8.3 km to the south for a total area of about 77 km².

The Suguti property is located within the prospective greenstone belt of the Mara–Musoma goldfield. The outcropping geology comprises an area of mafic to intermediate volcanics that form a large easterly trending range of hills in the northern portion of the property. This range is dominated by a prominent and strongly magnetic BIF extending for at least 8 km across the property. Smaller BIF units occur elsewhere within the volcanic succession and these are typically 5 to 10m wide representing thin interflow sediments to the volcanics. The greenstones are most likely part of the Upper Nyanzian System. The south west corner of the project is covered by mbugu clays which have filled a topographic depression formed by the regionally significant northwest-trending Suguti shear. The primary shear extends in excess of 50 km and has displacements of several kilometres interpreted from the geology either side of the fault contact. The shear is also readily identified from the aerial magnetic data as zones of demagnetisation. A secondary cross cutting northeast trending fault terminates the eastern end of the prominent BIF horizon. This 0600 orientation is an important control on mineralisation which is known to host gold resources elsewhere in the Mara-Musoma goldfield.

== Nickel Overview ==
Rocks of the Karagwe–Ankolean Supergroup host most of the known nickel, copper, PGE, and tin mineralisation in Tanzania. This Supergroup forms part of the north trending Kibaran Fold Belt that extends from Zambia, through the Democratic Republic of Congo, Burundi and NW Tanzania, into Uganda and to the west of Lake Victoria. Rift Valley has secured properties along the fold belt. The properties have received very little known modern exploration but have the key components needed to host accumulations of magmatic nickel sulfides such as for the Kabanga-style mineralisation. The targets are typically greenfields and highly conceptual in nature but are well-founded on the concepts and nickel mineralisation models which have evolved over the past 40 years of exploration in Tanzania. These mobile belts are increasingly recognized for their potential to host significant nickel, copper and platinum group element (Ni-Cu-PGE) deposits like the Kabanga Deposit and the Kagera prospect, which are situated near the border with Burundi.
