= Bunda =

Bunda may refer to:

- Bunda District, Tanzania
  - Bunda Town, capital of Bunda District
- Bunda Station, a cattle station in the Northern Territory, Australia
- Robert Bunda (born 1947), American politician in the Hawaii Senate
- Bunda, nickname for Indonesian musician and entertainment personality Dorce Gamalama
- Bunda, primary component of the binary star Xi Aquarii in the constellation of Aquarius
- A British slang term for the buttocks

== See also ==
- Bunde (disambiguation)
