= Utegi =

- Town
- Location within Tanzania
- Coordinates: 1°19′S 34°13′E
- Country: Tanzania
- Region: Mara Region
- Time zone: UTC+3 (EAT)

Utegi is a town in northern Tanzania.
