= Musoma Rural District =

Musoma Rural District Wilaya ya Musoma
- District
- Musoma District of Mara Region
- Coordinates: 01°52′S 033°36′E
- Country: Tanzania
- Region: Mara Region

Area
  - Total: 1,276 km^{2} (493 sq mi)

Population (2022)
  - Total: 266,665
  - Density: 209.0/km^{2} (541.3/sq mi)

Musoma Rural District is one of the 9 districts of Mara Region of Tanzania. Mara region has the following Districts councils: Musoma district council, Rorya district council, Tarime rural, Tarime town council, Butiama, Serengeti, Bunda rural council, Bunda town Council and Musomal Municipal council. Its administrative centre is the town of Musoma. The district is bordered to the east by Butiama District, to the south by Bunda District and to the west and north by Lake Victoria.

According to the 2022 Tanzania National Census, the population of the Musoma Rural District was 266,665.

== Transport ==
There are no paved roads connecting the district. Musoma town can be reached using unpaved regional road R188. Musoma Rural District is connected to Bunda Town by unpaved regional road R187.

== Administrative subdivisions ==
As of 2012, Musoma Rural District was administratively divided into 14 wards.

=== Wards ===
Bugoji Ifulifu Musanja
- Bugwema
- Bukima
- Bukumi
- Bulinga
- Busambara
- Bwasi
- Kiriba

- Makojo
- Mugango
- Murangi
- Nyambono
- Nyamrandirira
- Suguti
- Tegeruka
