= Kowak =

- Village
- Location in Tanzania
- Coordinates: 01°21′45″S 034°09′10″E
- Country: Tanzania
- Region: Mara Region
- District: Rorya District
- Time zone: UTC+3 (EAT)
- UFI: -1722362

Kowak is a village situated in the Rorya District in Mara Region of northern Tanzania, East Africa. Kowak is in Nyathorogo ward, in Luo-Imbo division of Rorya District.

== Demographics ==
The major clans in the village are Kakibira, Kachiemo, Kotho, Kamot, Kanyaguti and Kanyagak. Kibira (with wife called Ang'wa) conceived Warie and Milongo. Milongo conceived Auma (Didi and Oyugi family) and Ochola. Warie conceived Abong'o Gumo and Owuor Nyanguku. With another wife called Odera, Kibira conceived Awuor Mbero, Obambo, Odipo and Ngueru. Abong'o Gumo conceived Owiti, Gumba and Rucho. Owiti conceived Awuor and another son who came to conceive Odeck. Owuor Nyanguku conceived Waega, Wayaye, Amata Ochola and Sembe. Descendants of Gumba are Okuoga, Otieno mbeche and Joka Odingo. It is Didi family that bears Joka-Saramba, Jok-Abuodha and Jok-Awiti.

== I History ==
The history of this village dates back to several centuries if not back to the first millennium when the Luo people migrated south and east along the shores of Lake Victoria into what is now Tanzania. The name "Kowak" for this village comes from an ancestor named Owak, who first homesteaded there. In Luo, someone's homestead is identified by his name or her name. For example, Onyango's homestead is called Konyango, Achola's is Kachola, Chiemo's is Kachiemo and Raila's is Karaila. That is why Owak's homestead is now known as Kowak. Owak had five wives namely Nyagak, Nyaguti, Chipa and Mot. With Chipa he conceived Kibira and Otho. With Nyaguti, he conceived three sons; Maugo, Okecha and Chwonyo. With Nyagak he conceived Ondiek, Achuth and Otenga. With Mot he conceived Ade and Ogunda. Chiemo was adapted son who lived in Owak homestead and Owak gave him the status of younger brother. Now, the Kowak village is generally considered to be occupied by the descendants of Kibira, who was the firstborn, and thus inherited his father's homestead. The village of Nyasoko was made by Otho's descendants, and Omuga was made by Chiemo's descendants. Also, Det village was made by Mot and her sons; Somba Nyasoko was made by Nyaguti and Nyagak and their sons. Kowak people are only pure Luo blooded in Tanzania compared to others who had married to other tribes like Kurya and others.
