= Sizaki people =

Ethnic group from Mara Region of Tanzania

The Sizaki are a Bantu ethnolinguistic group based in north-western Butiama District of Mara Region of Tanzania, near Lake Victoria. In 1987 the Sizaki population was estimated to number 82,000 .
