= Shirati =

Town in Mara Region, Tanzania

Shirati Mji wa Shirati
- Town
- Location of Shirati
- Coordinates: 1°09′13″S 34°01′49″E
- Country: Tanzania
- Region: Mara Region
- District: Rorya
- Time zone: UTC+3 (East Africa Time)
- Website: Regional website

Shirati is a town in Rorya District in North Mara, Tanzania on the shore above Lake Victoria, near the border with Kenya. It has a population of c. 100,000 It is the northernmost town at the border with Kenya at is located in Royra District. Most of the residents of Shirati are DhoLuo speaking people Nilotes. Suba people, a subbranch of Bantu communities who adopted Luo customs, language, and practices also live in Shirati. Similarly, Shirati has a substantial number of Westerners who work at the mission at Kabwana – translated into "the white people's home" from Luo.

== History ==
When Shirati was part of German East Africa, the Germans built a fort there, built a sturdy gravel road down to the shore of Lake Victoria where they put in a stone pier, as well as constructing a number of other official buildings.
