= RLL =

RLL may refer to:

- Run Length Limited, an encoding scheme for disk drives
- Relay Ladder Logic, a programming language for industrial control
- Radio Local Loop, same as Wireless Local Loop (WLL)
- Rahal Letterman Lanigan Racing, an auto racing team in the WeatherTech SportsCar Championship
- right lower lobe, see List of medical abbreviations: R
