= Girango people =

Ethnic group

Girango/Suba
Total population
- 300,000 Kenya and Tanzania

Regions with significant populations
- Migori in Western Kenya, Rorya in northern Tanzania

Languages
- Dholuo, Swahili, and English

Religion
- Christianity, African Traditional Religion, Islam

Related ethnic groups
- Other Luo peoples, other Nilotic peoples

Luo
- Person: Jaluo (m)/Nyaluo (f)
- People: Joluo
- Language: Dholuo
- Country: Pinj Luo/Lolwe

The Girango people (also known as JoSuba or Joka-Kombe) is a group of Luo people who fall in the group known as Joka Jok. They include the Suna/Suba, Wategi/Kamagambo-Kanying'ombe, Wagire, JoKasgunga, JoSidho, JoKabar, JoMur, JoKiseru etc. They migrated to Kenya from northern Uganda, and are believed to be the brothers of the Simbiti. However, the Simbiti were absorbed into Kuria community, and that is why the people of Kuria have diverse origins. Some historians tend to use the Bunchari dialect of the Kuria spoken by the Simbiti, as well as the Kuria culture followed by the Simbiti to discuss the Girango people.
