= Muz =

Muz may refer to:

- muz, the ISO 639-3 code for the Mursi language in Ethiopia
- MuZ, a former acronym for MZ Motorrad- und Zweiradwerk
- MUZ, the IATA code for Musoma Airport in northern Tanzania
- Muz-TV, a Russian TV channel
- Julie Atlas Muz (born 1973), American performance artist
