= Mwalimu Nyerere Museum Centre =

Museum in Tanzania

Coordinates: 1.762874°S 33.960191°E

Mwalimu Julius Kambarage Nyerere Museum
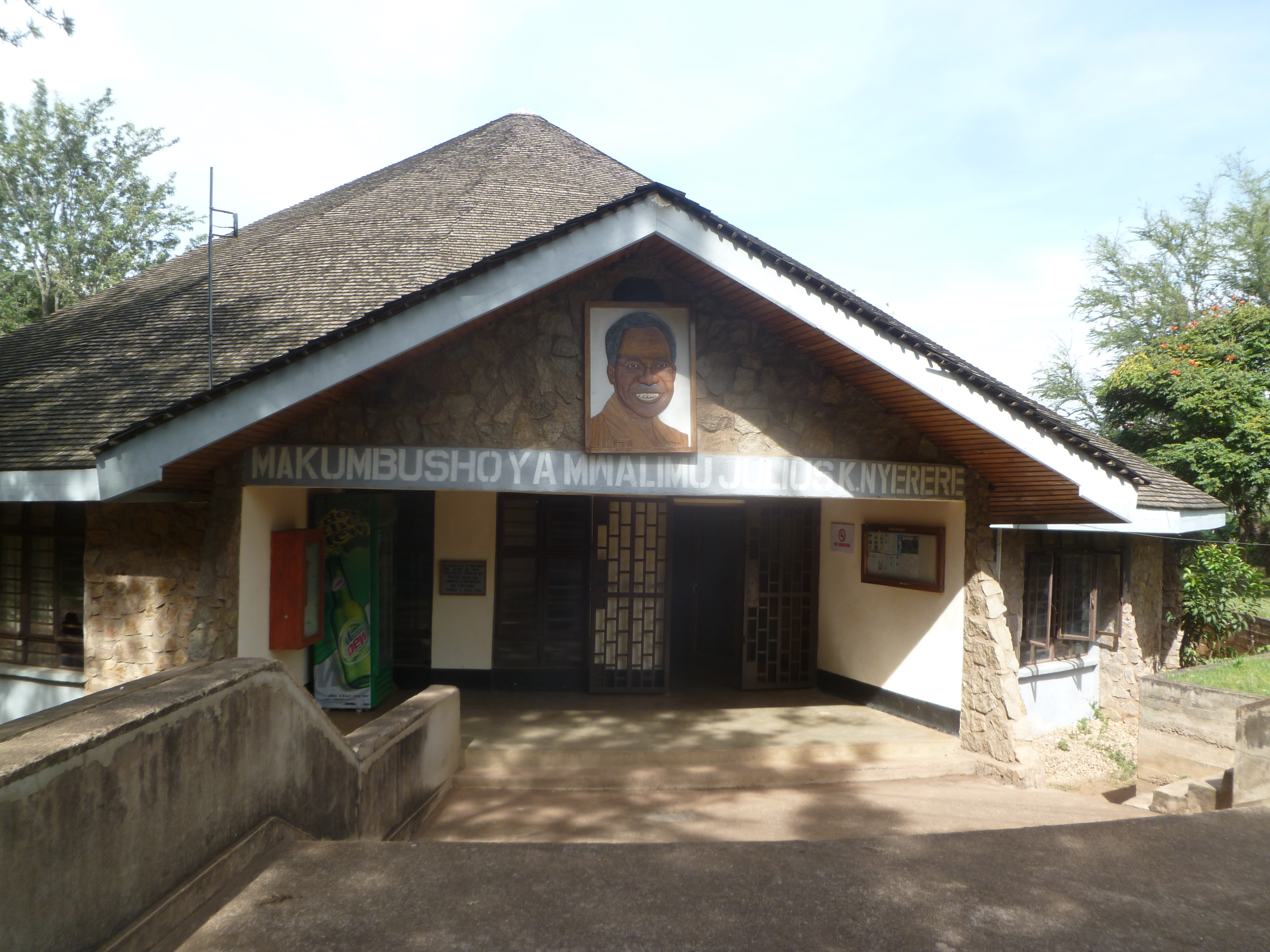
- Established: 2 July 1999
- Location: Butiama District, Mara Region in Tanzania.

Mwalimu Julius Kambarage Nyerere Museum is located at Butiama village - the birth and burial place of the Father of The nation in, Butiama District, Mara Region in Tanzania. The museum was officially opened by the Prime minister of the United Republic of Tanzania, Hon. Frederick Tluway Sumaye on 2 July 1999. Julius Nyerere also attended the opening ceremony.

It hosts various items for public display by Mwalimu Julius Kambarage Nyerere. The items include those which:

1. Received during the technical challenges for country's independence.
2. Given as gifts during his presidency.
3. Personally used in his farm in his home village of Butiama, Tanzania.
4. Received as he was stepping down from the presidency in the year 1985.

== See also ==
- List of museums in Tanzania
