= Ikizu people =

Ethnic group from Mara Region of Tanzania

The Ikizu (or Ikiizo; Swahili: Waikizu) are an ethnic and linguistic group based in Bunda District of Mara Region in northern Tanzania. In 1987, the Ikizu population was estimated to number 28,000. They speak the Ikizu language.
