= Kwaya people =

Ethnic group from Mara Region of Tanzania

The Kwaya are a Bantu ethnolinguistic group based in the Mara Region of northern Tanzania, on the southeastern shore of Lake Victoria. In 1987 the Kwaya population was estimated to number 102,000. They are found at Musoma district.as it's their original area of residence as the word musoma itself came from the word "Omusoma" which is the kwaya word meaning a portion of land projecting into the lake .and the name of their tribe came from a bird known as eagle
