= Bunde =

Bunde may refer to:

== People ==
- Con Bunde (born 1938), American educator and politician

== Places ==
- Bunde, Germany, a town in the Leer District in Lower Saxony, Germany
- Bunde, Netherlands, a town in the municipality of Meerssen in Limburg, the Netherlands
- Bünde, a town in North Rhine-Westphalia, Germany
- Bunde, Minnesota, an unincorporated community, United States

== See also ==
- Bunda (disambiguation)
