= Musoma Urban District =

Musoma Urban District Wilaya ya Musoma Jijini
- District
- Musoma Municipal District of Mara Region
- Coordinates: 01°30′S 033°48′EGNS-enwiki
- Country: Tanzania
- Region: Mara Region

Area
  - Total: 66.13 km^{2} (25.53 sq mi)

Population (2022)
  - Total: 164,172
  - Density: 2,483/km^{2} (6,430/sq mi)

Musoma Urban District is one of the seven districts of Mara Region of Tanzania. Its capital is the town of Musoma. The district is bordered to the north by Lake Victoria and to the south by Butiama District.

According to the 2022 Tanzania National Census, the population of the Musoma Urban District was 164,172.

== Transport ==
Paved trunk road T17 connects Musoma Urban District with Butiama District.

== Administrative subdivisions ==
As of 2012, Musoma Urban District was administratively divided into 13 wards.

=== Wards ===
- Buhare
- Bweri
- Iringo
- Kamunyonge
- Kigera
- Kitaji
- Makoko
- Mukendo
- Mwigobero
- Mwisenge
- Nyakato
- Nyamatare
- Nyasho
