= Ikizu language =

Bantu language spoken in Tanzania

Ikizu
- Ikikizu
- Native to: Tanzania
- Native speakers: 53,000 (2009)
- Language family: Niger–Congo?: Atlantic–Congo; Volta-Congo; Benue–Congo; Bantoid; Southern Bantoid; Bantu; Northeast Bantu; Great Lakes Bantu; East Nyanza; Nyanza Mara; Ikizu
- Dialects: Sizaki; Ikizu

Language codes
- ISO 639-3: ikz
- Glottolog: ikiz1238
- Guthrie code: JE.402,404
- ELP: Ikizu

Ikizu (Ikikizu, Kiikiizo) is a Bantu language spoken by the Ikizu peoples of Tanzania. Its dialects are Ikizu proper and Sizaki. Maho (2009) treats Sizaki (Shashi) as a separate language. However, Ethnologue 16th edition retired the ISO code for Sizaki, merging it into Ikizu.

== Orthography ==
Ikizu uses the Latin alphabet. It does not include the letters Q, V, or X. The letters B and C are only used in the forms Bh and Ch.

== Sources ==
- Sewangi, Seleman S. (2008). Kiikiizo: Msamiati wa Kiikiizo–Kiingereza–Kiswahili na Kiingereza–Kiikiizo–Kiswahili / Ikiizo–English–Swahili and English–Ikiizo–Swahili Lexicon. ISBN 9987691110.
