= Paul Bomani =

Tanzanian politician and diplomat

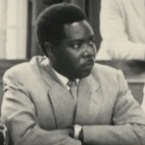

1st Minister of Finance
- In office 1962–1965
- President: Julius Nyerere
- Succeeded by: Amir H. Jamal

Personal details
- Born: 1 January 1925 Musoma, Tanganyika
- Died: 1 April 2005 (aged 80) Dar es Salaam, Tanzania
- Resting place: Mwanza
- Party: CCM
- Other political affiliations: Tanganyika African National Union
- Spouse: Kessi Hildegard
- Children: 9
- Education: Johns Hopkins University (MA)

Paul Lazaro Bomani (January 1, 1925 – April 1, 2005) was a Tanzanian politician and ambassador to the United States and Mexico.

== Biography ==
Paul Bomani was born in 1925 in Ikizu, Mara Region. He served as the Minister of Finance, Agriculture, Economic Affairs and Planning, and Commerce and Industry. He also served as a member of Parliament. Paul Bomani was a very successful business man and was reported to be one of the richest African in Tanzania by 1970. Paul Bomani is among a handful of Tanganyikans/Tanzanians who made significant contributions to the country. He was active in the independence struggle and after Tanganyika/Tanzania won independence, he was one of the main people responsible for finance and development for the country in the 1960s to early 70s.

Paul Bomani attended Nassa Primary School in Mwanza from 1936 to 39. He joined the Teacher Training College in Ikizu, Mara from 1939 to 1944. He worked as the Assistant Secretary of Cash Stores of the Williamson Diamonds Limited in Shinyanga between 1945 and 1947. He became the Managing Secretary of Mwanza African Traders Co-operative Society Limited 1947 to 1952. Mwanza African Traders Co-operative Society was a wholesale cooperative started to assist African traders. Bomani founded the Lake Province Cotton Growers Association in 1950.

Bomani left Tanganyika to study in England in 1953. He studied Agricultural Economics and Co-operative Laws at Loughborough Co-operative College in England from 1953 to 1954. Bomani returned to Tanganyika and continued with work as an organizer and one of the leaders of the nascent independence movement. He worked as the General Manager of Victoria Federation of Co-operative Unions Limited from 1955 to 1960.

Bomani became very active in Tanganyika politics early on; he was elected as the provincial Chairman of the Tanganyika African Association (TAA) from 1950 to 1953. The colonial government appointed him as the member of the Legislative Council in 1954. The appointment came after Chief Kidaha Makwaia left the territory. Makwaia would later resign under pressure. Paul Bomani became a powerful force in the Lake Province with the establishment of TANU as the main political party fighting for independence starting in 1954. Bomani helped to make TANU a powerful force in the Lake Province.

Paul Bomani was appointed as a member of the Post Election Committee in 1959 by the Tanganyika Governor, Sir Richard Turnbull. Bomani was among a handful of Africans appointed to the committee; others included Chief John Maruma, Rashidi Kawawa, and L.N. Sijaona. The committee was given the responsibility of making recommendations for the next step for Tanganyika.

Tanganyika won Responsible Government in 1960 and Self Government in 1961. Bomani was appointed as the Minister for Agriculture and Co-operatives between 1960 and 1962. Paul Bomani’s brother, Mark Bomani, was appointed as the Deputy Solicitor General for Tanganyika in August 1962. Paul Bomani became the Minister for Finance between 1962 and 1965 and the Minister for Economic Affairs and Development Planning from 1965 to 1970. Bomani served as the Minister for Commerce and Industry between 1970 and 1972 and then served as the Tanzania Ambassador to the US.

Paul Bomani took on the challenge of finding ways to finance the government after independence; it was a daunting task. The UK was not willing to provide funding necessary for developing a newly independent Tanganyika. The country did not have enough trained men and women to do the necessary work needed to move the country forward. Bomani travelled to East and Western countries asking for funds at the height of the Cold War. It was a difficult assignment that he managed with ease. He had to collect funds needed to educate Tanganyikans who did not have opportunities during the colonial period. This assignment he performed with distinction.

Bomani was one of the few leaders who remained active during the army mutiny of 1964. Bomani, Lusinde, and Kambona were among the few leaders who negotiated with the soldiers during the most tense moments of the mutiny between January 20 and 25th, 1964. One day before the British troops landed in Dar es Salaam, Bomani spent all day negotiating with the ringleaders of the mutiny regarding their pay. He knew that a request was made to the British for intervention while he was negotiating. In fact Bomani together with Kambona were the ones who took a letter from Kawawa and delivered it to the UK High Commissioner in Tanganyika; the letter made an official request for British intervention. During those tense hours of negotiations, Bomani is reported to have said he only had a “glass of milk in the morning and a large whisky in the evening.” He worked tirelessly to calm down the soldiers and reassure the public that all was under control. His brother, Mark Bomani, would later lead the government case against the mutineers.

Tanzania broke off diplomatic relations with UK in 1965 over the question of Southern Rhodesia. UK reacted by cancelling all aid promised to Tanzania. Tanganyika became Tanzania in October 1964. In 1964, Bomani had been instrumental in securing a 7.5 million Pound loan to Tanganyika from UK in 1964. UK refused to fulfill any financial commitment it made to in Tanzania in 1965 after Tanzania broke off diplomatic relations with the UK over the question of independence for Southern Rhodesia. Bomani once again found himself in a difficult situation. He had to find other ways to provide funds for the Tanzania government. Bomani was among those who negotiated successful agreements with China to provide needed funds for Tanzania in 1966.

Bomani became close to many African American leaders in the 1970s and helped attract interest on Tanzania. Bomani was among the organizers of the 5th Pan African Congress held in Tanzania in 1974.

== Career ==
In 1960, Bomani became the Minister of Natural Resources and Cooperative Development in the Tanganyika government. He held several other ministerial positions. Between 1972 and 1983 he was the ambassador to the United States and Mexico. From 1992 until his death he was the chairman of Tanzania Breweries Limited and Tanzania Distilleries Limited and from 1993 he was chancellor of the University of Dar es Salaam.

Bomani described himself in his own words

A College professor once described me as a resourceful, moderate revolutionary, with a talent to organize and mobilize people. I was Julius Nyerere's right hand man during the fight for independence. The Sukuma people were the largest tribe in Tanganyika and more than a quarter of the country's population lived in the Lake zone. I was able to galvanized the support of the 50 traditional chiefs of Sukumaland and commanded their great respect and trust . Because of the success o our grassroots social and business organizations that existed prior to the formation of TANU I was also able to draw unequaled goodwill from the confidence and faith of the ordinary people of Sukuma, who had given me the affectionate nickname " Kishamapanda" - meaning. " The trailblazer". The full support that the movement for political independence received from the less populous areas of the country enabled Tanganyika to become the first country among the four East African States to attain political independence.

1961 Minister of Natural Resources and Cooperative Development.

1962 Minister of Finance of the Republic of Tanganyika

1964 Minister of Finance and economic Affairs of the United Republic of Tanzania

1965 Minister of economic Affairs and development Planning

1970 Minister of Commerce, Industry and Mining

1972 -1983 Ambassador to the United States of America and the Republic of Mexico

1983 Minister for Mineral Resources and Mining

1984 Minister for Lands, Natural Resources, Tourism and Housing

1986 Minister for Agriculture and Marketing

1988 Minister for Labour and Social Welfare

1989 Minister for Local Government, Marketing, Cooperative and Community Development

1990 Minister President's Office, responsible for the Implementation and Coordination of Cabinet Policy

OTHER ASSIGNMENTS AND POSITION

1955 General Manager, Victoria Federation of Cooperative Unions Ltd. Mwanza ( Cotton ginning and Marketing)

1950 President, Lake Province Cotton Growers Association, the cotton farmers mobilization conference, and precursor to the Cooperative Movement

1952 President, Sukuma Union 1954 Member of the Legislative Council (LEGCO) appointed by the British governor-general.

1958 Member of the Rammage Constitutional Reform Committee ( established Universal Franchise.

1961 Member of the Ian Macleod Constitutional Committee ( which ushered in the independence of Tanganyika).

1960 -1985 Member of Parliament

1968 Member of the Philip Commission for the Treaty and establishment of the East African Community

1962 - 1970 Governor of IRBD (World Bank); attended Annual General Meetings of the IMF and IRBD

1965 Member of Makerere University Council and Nairobi University Advisory Council. 1975 - 1982

Councilor, American University Advisory Board 1980 - 1986 President International Cotton Institute; Washington D.C. U.S.A. and Brussels; Belgium.

Last held positions

1992 to 2005 Chairman, Tanzania Breweries Limited and Tanzania Distilleries Limited

1993 to 2005 Chancellor, University of Dar es Salaam
