= Roland Brown =

English barrister

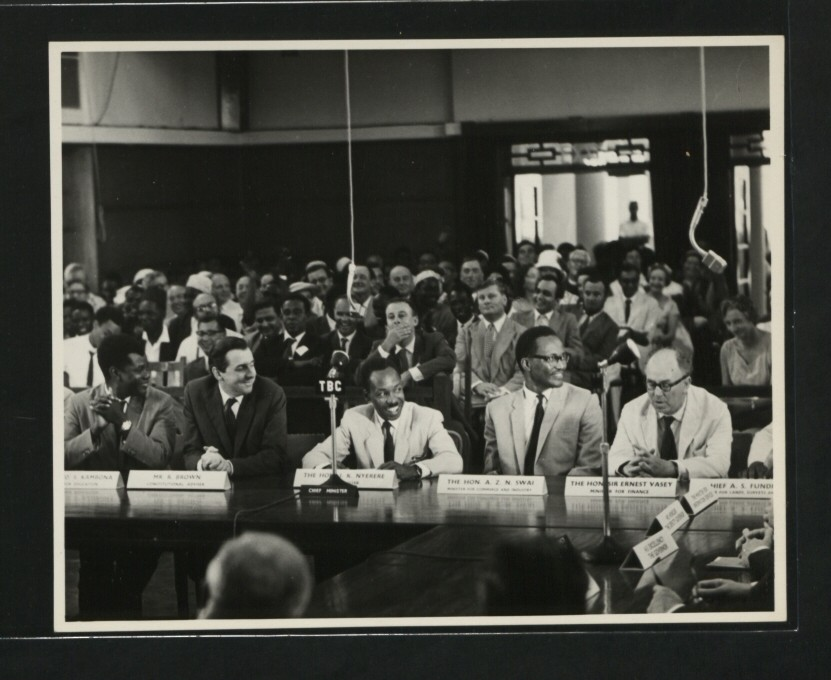
- Brown (second left)

1st Attorney General of Tanzania
- In office 1964–1965
- Appointed by: Julius Nyerere
- Succeeded by: Mark Bomani

Personal details
- Profession: Barrister

Roland Brown is an English barrister who served as the first Attorney General of Tanzania.

== Early life and career ==
Brown was a part time lecturer at Trinity College at the University of Cambridge. He was appointed as a constitutional adviser to Julius Nyerere, the leader of the Tanganyika Territory's independence movement.

=== Tanzania ===
Brown was appointed as the first Attorney General of independent Tanganyika, succeeding J. S. R. Cole, in 1961. However, he was not a member of the cabinet. After the revolution that overthrew the neighbouring Sultanate of Zanzibar in 1964, Nyerere is said to have asked him to draft a union agreement in the strictest confidence between Tanganyika and the new state of the People's Republic of Zanzibar and Pemba. In 1965, he was succeeded by Mark Bomani.

Following the 1967 Arusha Declaration, Brown was given three days to prepare a bill for the nationalization of private owned banks in the country.
