= RVR (restaurant) =

- Interactive map of RVR

Restaurant information
- Food type: Japanese
- Location: 1305 Abbot Kinney Blvd., Los Angeles, California, United States
- Coordinates: 33°59′29″N 118°28′05″W
- Website: rvr.la

RVR is a Japanese restaurant in Los Angeles, California, United States. The menu includes gyoza, ramen, and yakitori. It was included in The New York Times's 2025 list of the nation's fifty best restaurants.

== See also ==
- List of Japanese restaurants
