= Mugumu =

- Town
- Location in Tanzania
- Coordinates: 01°50′S 34°40′E
- Country: Tanzania
- Region: Mara Region
- District: Serengeti District

Population (2022 census)
  - Total: 36,000
- Time zone: GMT + 3

Mugumu is a town in Mara Region, Tanzania. It is the administrative seat of Serengeti District.

According to the 2012 census, the population of Mugumu town (Mugumu and Stendi Kuu Wards) was 16,851.

There are plans to build a new international airport in Mugumu town, to boost the number of visitors to Serengeti National Park.
