= Butiama =

Town in Mara Region, Tanzania

- Location of Butiama Butiama (Africa)
- Coordinates: 1°46′S 33°58′E
- Country: Tanzania
- Region: Mara Region
- District: Musoma Rural

Area
  - Urban: 10 sq mi (26 km^{2})

Population (2002)
  - City: 15,383
- Time zone: UTC+3 (East Africa Time)
- Website: Regional website

Butiama is a town and capital of Butiama District, located in Mara Region in northern Tanzania. The town of Butiama is the birthplace of Julius Nyerere, the founding father and the first president of Tanzania. Butiama is also the homeland of the Zanaki people, of which the founding father was a member. The Mwalimu Nyerere Museum Centre is located in the town and is the town's biggest attraction.

Several things have been named Butiama because of its significance to Tanzanian history, including the ferry MV Butiama that operates between Mwanza and Ukerewe.

According to the 2002 Tanzania National Census, the population of Butiama was 15,383.
