= Musoma Airport =

Airport in Mara Region, Tanzania

Musoma Airport Uwanja wa Ndege wa Musoma (Swahili)
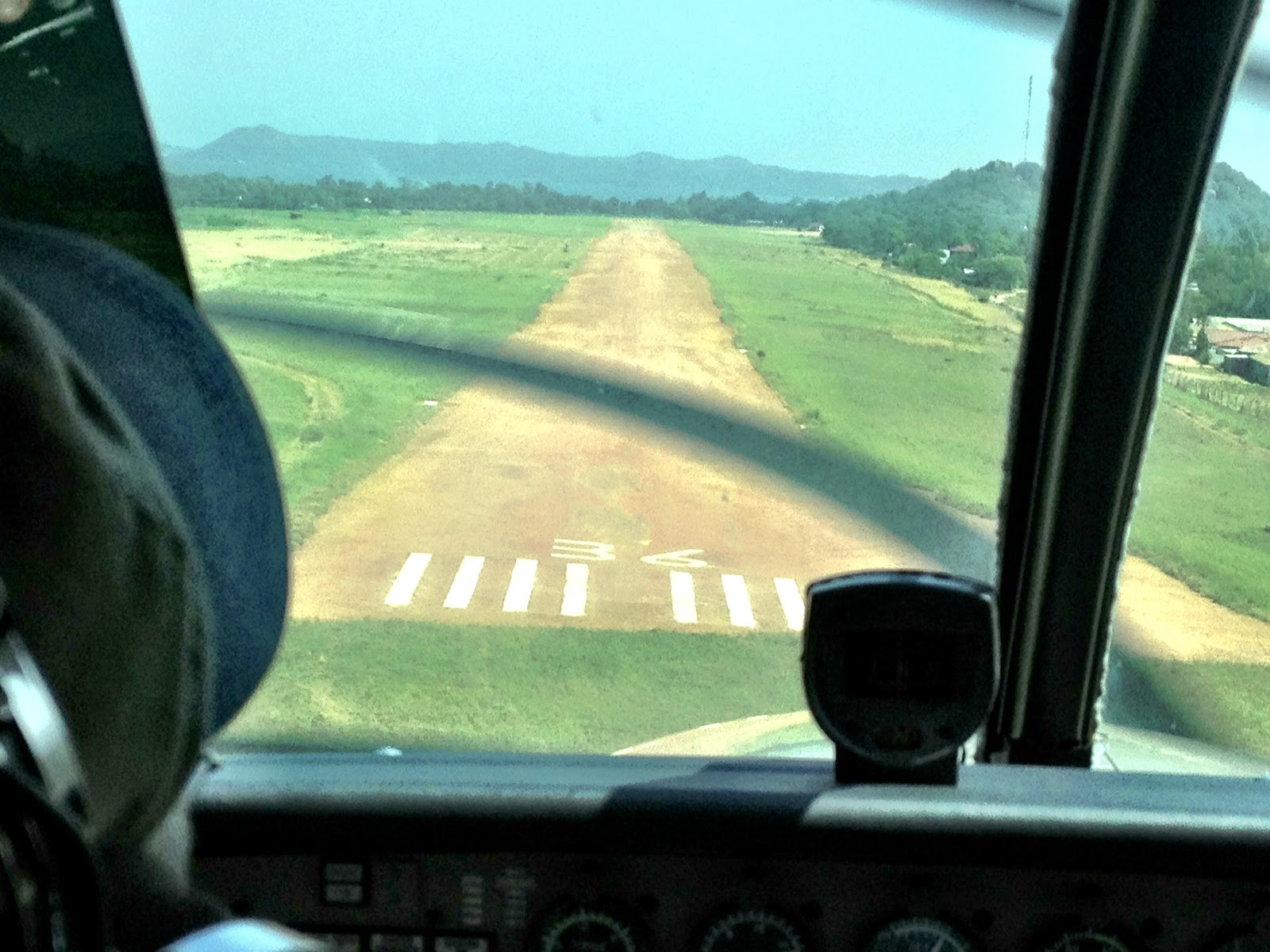
- IATA: MUZ; ICAO: HTMU; WMO: 63733

Summary
- Airport type: Public
- Owner: Government of Tanzania
- Operator: Tanzania Airports Authority
- Location: Musoma, Tanzania
- Elevation AMSL: 3,783 ft (1,153 m)
- Coordinates: 1°30′10″S 33°48′08″E
- Website: www.taa.go.tz

Map
- Location of airport in Tanzania

Runways
Direction	Length		Surface
Direction	m	ft	Surface
18/36	1,600	5,249	Gravel

Statistics
- Passengers: 7,867
- Sources: TCAA Google Maps GCM

Musoma Airport (IATA: MUZ, ICAO: HTMU) is an airport in northern Tanzania serving Musoma and the surrounding Mara Region.

The Musoma non-directional beacon (Ident: MU) is on the field.

== Airlines and destinations ==
Airlines	Destinations
Auric Air	Mwanza
Precision Air	Dar es Salaam

== See also ==
- List of airports in Tanzania
- Transport in Tanzania
