= List of medical abbreviations: R =

Abbreviation	Meaning
R	respiration, (right)
RA	refractory anemia rheumatoid arthritis right atrium room air
RAD	reflex anal dilatation right axis deviation reactive airway disease radiation absorbed dose reactive attachment disorder
Rad hys	radical hysterectomy
RAE	right atrial enlargement
RAI	radioactive iodine
RAIU	thyroid reactive iodine uptake
RAPD	relative afferent pupillary defect
RAS	renal artery stenosis
RATLH	Robotic assisted total laparoscopic hysterectomy
RATVH	Radical Total Vaginal Hysterectomy
RBBB	right bundle branch block
RBC	red blood cells, red blood count
RBE	relative biologic equivalent
RBLM	recurrent benign lymphocytic meningitis
RCA	right coronary artery
RCC	renal cell carcinoma
RCM	restrictive cardiomyopathy right costal margin
RCR	rotator cuff repair
RCT	randomized controlled trial
RD	retinal detachment
RDS	respiratory distress syndrome (see also infant respiratory distress syndrome)
RDW	red cell distribution width
REI	Reproductive Endocrinology and Infertility
REM	rapid eye movement roentgen equivalent man
RF	rheumatoid factor rheumatic fever Renal Failure
RFA	Radiofrequency ablation
RFLP	restriction fragment length polymorphism
RFT	renal function test
r/g/m	rubs/gallops/murmurs (see heart sounds)
Rh	rhesus factor
Rhabdo	Rhabdomyolysis
RHC	right heart catheterization
RHD	Rheumatic heart disease
RhF	rheumatoid factor
RIA	radioimmunoassay
RIBA	radioimmunoblotting assay
RICE	rest, ice, compression, and elevation (treatment for a soft tissue injury)
RIF	rifampin
RIMA	reversible inhibitor of monoamine oxidase A
RIND	reversible ischemic neurologic deficit
RL	Ringer's lactate (that is, lactated Ringer's solution)
RLE	right lower extremity
RLL	right lower lobe (of lung)
RLN	recurrent laryngeal nerve; regional lymph node
RLQ	right lower quadrant (of abdomen)
R&M	Routine + microscopic (General analysis of urine)
RML	right middle lobe (of lung)
RMS	rhabdomyosarcoma
RMSF	rocky mountain spotted fever
RNA	ribonucleic acid
RNP	ribonucleoprotein
RNV	radionuclide ventriculography
RNY	Roux-en-Y anastomosis
R/O	rule out
ROA	right occipital anterior (see childbirth)
ROH	removal of hardware
ROM	range of motion rupture of membranes
ROP	right occipital posterior (see childbirth) retinopathy of prematurity
ROS	review of systems
ROSC	return of spontaneous circulation
ROW	Rest of the Week; as in, "Take 2 mg on Monday and 1 mg ROW"
RPGN	rapidly progressing glomerulonephritis
RPLND	retroperitoneal lymph node dissection
RPR	rapid plasma reagin test
RR	respiratory rate blood pressure measured with a specific sphygmomanometer relative risk
RRMS	relapsing-remitting multiple sclerosis
RRP	Recurrent Respiratory Papillomatosis
RRR	regular rate and rhythm (see pulse)
RRT	Renal replacement therapy
r/r/w	rales, rhonchi, wheezes (lung sounds)
RS cell	Reed–Sternberg cell
RSB	Right sternal border
RSI	rapid sequence induction
RSV	respiratory syncytial virus
R/t	related to
RT	radiotherapy respiratory therapy reverse transcriptase
RT-PCR	reverse transcriptase polymerase chain reaction
RTA	renal tubular acidosis
RTC	return to clinic (appointment for outpatient for next medical examination)
RTS	Revised Trauma Score
RTV	ritonavir
RUE	right upper extremity
RUL	right upper lobe (of lung)
RUQ	right upper quadrant (see also regions of the abdomen)
RUTI	recurrent urinary tract infection
RV	residual volume right ventricle review
RVAD	right ventricular assist device
RVF	right ventricular failure, or rectovaginal fistula
RVH	right ventricular hypertrophy
RVR	rapid ventricular rate (tachycardia)
RVSP	right ventricular systolic pressure
RVT	renal vein thrombosis
RW	rolling walker
Rx or ℞ or R_{x}	(R with crossed tail) medical prescription, prescription drug, or remedy
RXN	reaction
