= Bunda District =

Bunda
- District
- Bunda District of Mara Region
- Coordinates: 02°00′S 33°50′E
- Country: Tanzania
- Region: Mara Region

Area
  - Total: 2,078 km^{2} (802 sq mi)

Population (2022 census)
  - Total: 243,822
  - Density: 117.3/km^{2} (303.9/sq mi)
- Website: Regional website

Bunda is one of the seven districts of Mara Region in the United Republic of Tanzania, East Africa. It is bordered to the north by the Musoma Rural District and Butiama District, to the east by Serengeti District, to the south by Bariadi District and Busega District, and to the west by Lake Victoria. The district administration town is also called Bunda, located on the north-south trans-national all tarmac highway from Kenya to Zambia via Tarime and the lakeside municipalities of Musoma, Mwanza, and thereon to Mbeya in southern Tanzania. The district has four divisions: Kenkombyo, Nansimo, Serengeti and Chamuriho.

Bunda Town, a city 70 km south of Musoma and west of the Serengeti National Park, serves as the district's capital. According to the 2022 Tanzania National Census, the population of Bunda District was 243,822.

== Transport ==
Paved Trunk road T4 from Mwanza to the Kenyan border passes through Bunda District from south to north.

== Administrative subdivisions ==
As of 2022, Bunda District was administratively divided into 19 wards.

=== Wards ===
- Butimba
- Chitengule
- Hunyari
- Igundu
- Iramba
- Kasuguti
- Ketare
- Kibara
- Kisorya
- Mihingo
- Mugeta
- Namhula
- Nampindi
- Nansimo
- Neruma
- Nyamang'uta
- Nyamihyoro
- Nyamuswa
- Salama

== Notable persons from Bunda District ==
- Joseph Warioba, 5th Tanzanian Prime Minister
