= Rorya District =

Rorya District Wilaya ya Rorya
- District
- Rorya District of Mara Region
- Coordinates: 01°15′S 034°09′E
- Country: Tanzania
- Region: Mara Region

Area
  - Total: 2,002 km^{2} (773 sq mi)

Population (2012)
  - Total: 354,490
  - Density: 177.1/km^{2} (458.6/sq mi)
- Website: Regional website

Rorya District is a district in Mara Region, United Republic of Tanzania. The district capital is the small town of Ingri Juu, while the largest town is Shirati. The district was created in 2007 from a part of Tarime District. It is bordered by Tarime District to the east, Butiama District to the south, Lake Victoria to the west, and the Republic of Kenya to the north. The majority of inhabitants are from the Luo tribe. Other ethnic group is Kurya. Kine, Simbiti, Sweta and Hacha are sub-groups within Kurya ethnic group.

According to the 2022 Tanzania National Census, the population of Rorya District was 354,490.

== Transport ==
Paved Trunk Road T4 from Mwanza to the Kenyan border passes through Rorya District from south to east.

== Issues ==
The biggest problems in Rorya District are hunger, water scarcity and AIDS.

== Geography ==
Rorya District is among the newly established councils, which commenced official on 1 July 2007. It emerged from division of Tarime District Council. The district is in the north of Tanzania and lies between latitudes 1°00" – 1°45" south of the Equator and longitudes 33° 30" – 35° 0" east of the Meridian.

Rorya district has two agro-economical zones — the midlands and low lands. The zones are between approximately attitudes 800mm and 1200mm with temperature varying from 14 °C to 30 °C. The annual rainfall ranges between 700mm and 1200mm. The district is bordered by the Republic of Kenya to the North, Tarime District to the east, Musoma District to the south and Lake Victoria to the Western side. Rorya District has a total area of 9,345 square kilometers.

According to the housing census of 2002, the district had 217,176 people of which 101,907 are males and 115,269 are females. The average growth rate was 2.8% as from 1998 to 2002.

== Constituencies ==
For parliamentary elections, Tanzania is divided into constituencies. Since 1995 elections Rorya District had one constituency: Rorya Constituency.

=== Divisions ===
There are four divisions

1. Girango
2. Nyancha
3. Suba
4. Luo Imbo
5. Nyarombo

=== Wards ===
There are 21 wards (with total population - 2012):

- Kigunga - 13,824
- Kirogo - 7,250
- Nyamtinga - 11,203
- Nyamagaro - 17,006
- Nyahongo - 18,454
- Mkoma - 17,132
- Tai - 12,506
- Bukura - 15,228
- Roche - 8,728
- Kitembe - 9,845
- Mirare - 12,416
- Goribe - 9,915
- Ikoma - 10,397
- Koryo - 7,652
- Bukwe - 9,920
- Nyathorogo - 14,809
- Rabour - 11,259
- Kisumwa - 12,447
- Komuge - 13,651
- Nyamunga - 13,161
- Kyang'ombe - 18,438
- kyangasaga _ 16843

== Economy ==
The economy of Rorya residents and the district council depend on agricultural, livestock keeping, fishing, small industries and other resources:

=== Agricultural ===
More than 89% of the people living in the district depend on agriculture for their living. The district has 291,375 hectares, which are arable lands whereby 130,481 hectares are under cultivation. Area suitable for the irrigation is 17,350 square kilometers where irrigation takes place only at 1,039 square kilometers.

=== Livestock keeping ===
More than 70% Rorya citizens participate in livestock keeping. At least 27,718 household are livestock keepers. The challenges they face are livestock diseases and theft. The suba people are good in livestock keeping in the district; livestock are used for providing milk, meat, capital for most economic transactions, cultural object for rites, and ploughing.

The environmental impacts caused by livestock keeping include burning of forestry – preparation of pastures, soil erosion and compartment. The mitigation measures being advocated are destocking, zero grazing, and controlled burning.

=== Industries ===
The district has five small-scale industries including soap making, leather processing, bakery, milk processing, and spice processing.

=== Forestry ===
The district is endowed with natural resources that are virgin and natural. Forestry resources cover up to 1534 half of district land which is about 30% of the whole land of Rorya District. Other forests are owned by the community (18%) and individuals (12%) known as Ngitiri for domestic uses like fuel, construction and medicine. The type of forest includes Miombo woodlands.

=== Mineral resources ===
Mining activities in the district is of small-scale artisan mining. The data for mineral production is not readily available although it produces income to the community, while the district does not earn any income from this sector directly. There are also minerals used for construction like stones, aggregates, and sand. There is an unused natural gas source at Nyamusi area though no significant steps have been taken to extract and use it.

=== Fisheries ===
Rorya District council has 7252 km2 area that is covered by Lake Victoria; 23 villages are along the lake shore. Most of these villagers depends on fishing activities and other fishermen from the lake region. Rorya district depends on it as a source of income that is generated from the fisheries activities. Some economic fish species found in the lake are Nile-peach, tilapia and silver cyprinid (Omena in Luo) among others.

=== Beekeeping ===
Beekeeping is the newly established project in Rorya as the way of generating income. Ten groups were formed in villages with almost 400 beehives. The activity does not yet yield much income as the beekeepers use traditional hives.
