= Bunda Town =

Capital of Bunda District, Mara Region

Coordinates: 2.0500°S 33.8667°E

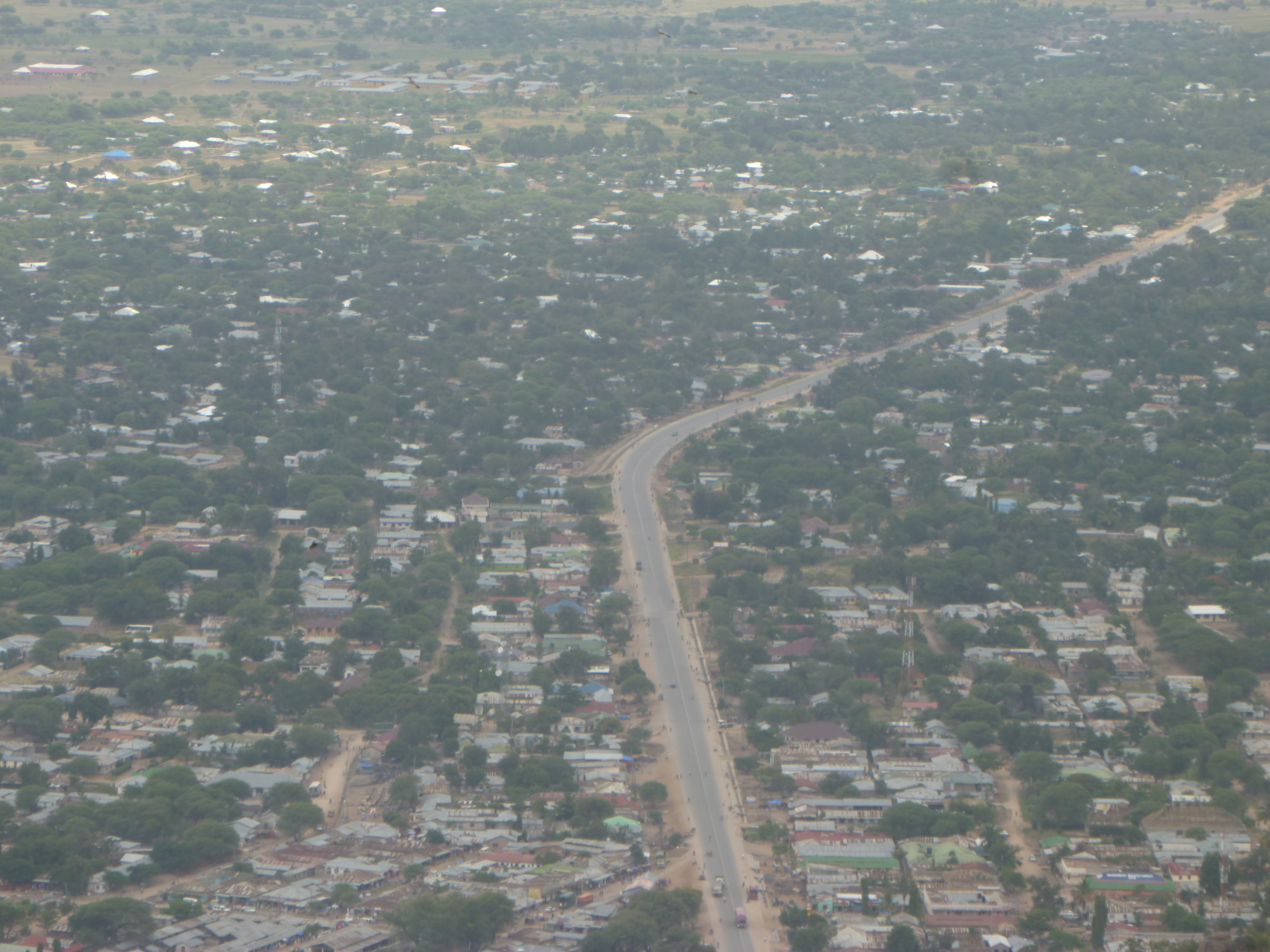
Bunda Town, as seen from Balili Mountain Resort. Looking in northern direction with the road going to Musoma in the middle.

Bunda Town is a city and capital of Bunda District. It is located in Mara Region in the United Republic of Tanzania.

The city was previously an administrative part of the Bunda District, but in 2007 it was parted from the District. The city had a population of 182,970 according to the 2022 census.

Bunda has had a friendly relationship with Tingvoll Municipality in Norway since 1990. In 2007, the partnership was expanded through a program called "Municipal International Co-Operation". The overall strategic goal for the programme is to improve municipal governance and services, and the method is to stimulate the collaboration between local authorities in Tingvoll and Bunda. There are 15 other pairs of municipalities included in the programme.
