= Serengeti District =

Serengeti District Wilaya ya Serengeti
- District
- Serengeti District of Mara Region
- Coordinates: 01°50′S 034°40′E
- Country: Tanzania
- Region: Mara Region

Area
  - Total: 11,156 km^{2} (4,307 sq mi)

Population (2022)
  - Total: 340,349
  - Density: 30.508/km^{2} (79.016/sq mi)
- Website: http://serengetidc.go.tz/

Serengeti District is one of the seven districts of Mara Region of Tanzania. Its administrative centre is the town of Mugumu. It is home to part of the Serengeti National Park a UNESCO World Heritage Site and contains one of the western gates to the park.

According to the 2022 Tanzania National Census, the population of Serengeti District was 340,349.

== Transport ==
There are no paved roads connecting Serengeti District with the rest of the country. The unpaved trunk road T17 from Musoma to Arusha passes through the district from west to east.

== Administrative subdivisions ==
As of 2012, Serengeti District was administratively divided into 28 wards.

=== Wards ===
- Busawe
- Geitasamo
- Ikoma
- Issenye
- Kebanchabancha
- Kenyamonta
- Kisaka
- Kisangura
- Kyambahi
- Machochwe
- Magange
- Majimoto
- Manchira
- Mbalibali
- Morotonga
- Mosongo
- Mugumu
- Natta
- Nyamatare
- Nyambureti
- Nyamoko
- Nyansurura
- Rigicha
- Ring'wani
- Rung'abure
- Sedeco
- Stendi Kuu
- Uwanja wa Ndege
