= Musoma =

Capital of Mara Region, Tanzania

Musoma Mji wa Musoma
- Town of Mara Region
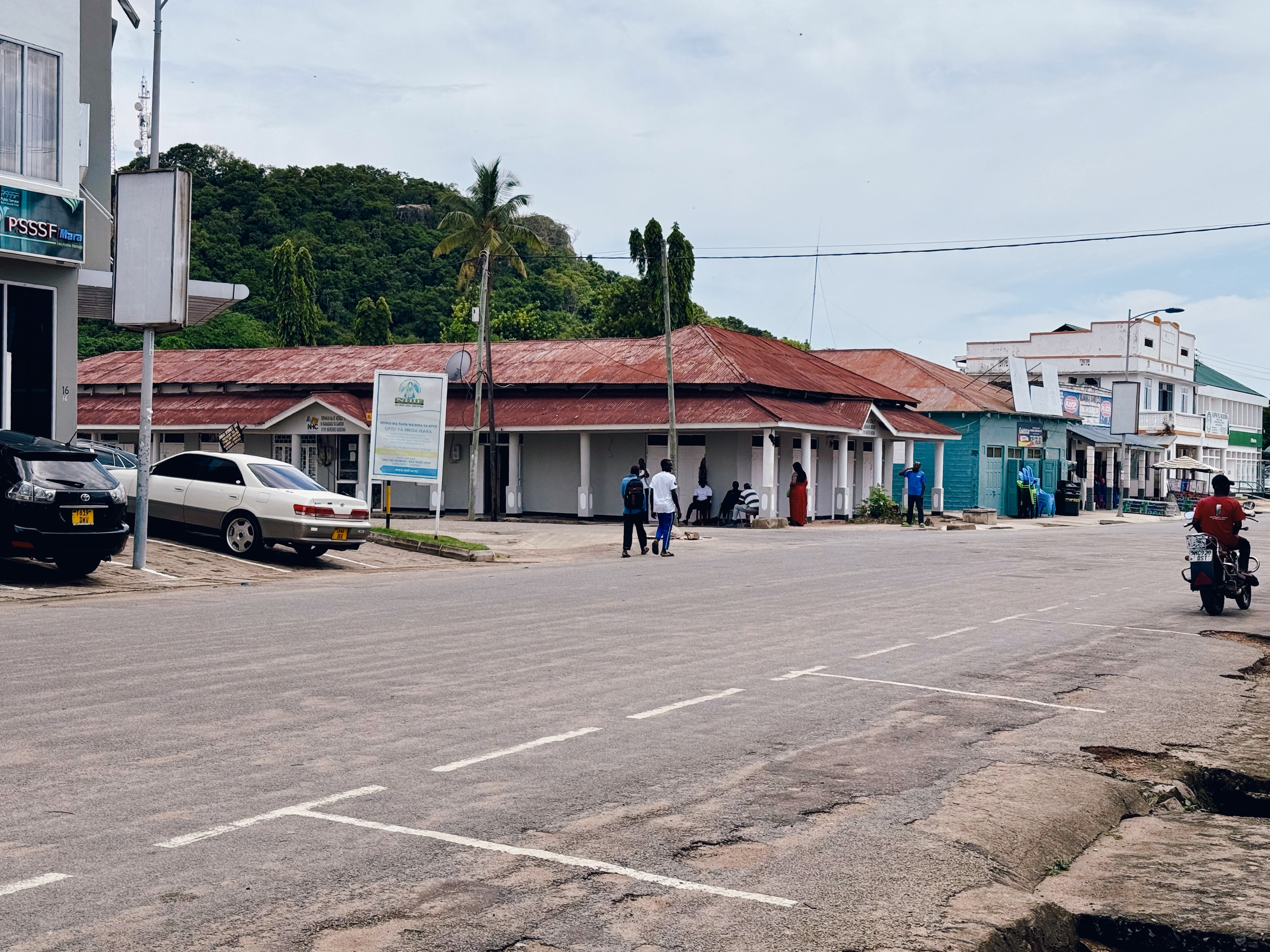

- Location in Tanzania
- Coordinates: 01°30′00″S 33°48′00″E
- Country: Tanzania
- Region: Mara Region
- District: Musoma Urban District

Government
  - Type: Mayor

Area
  - Total: 25.53 sq mi (66.13 km^{2})
- Elevation: 3,720 ft (1,134 m)

Population (2022 Census)
  - Total: 164,172
- Time zone: UTC+3 (East Africa Time)
- Climate: Aw
- Website: www.mara.go.tz

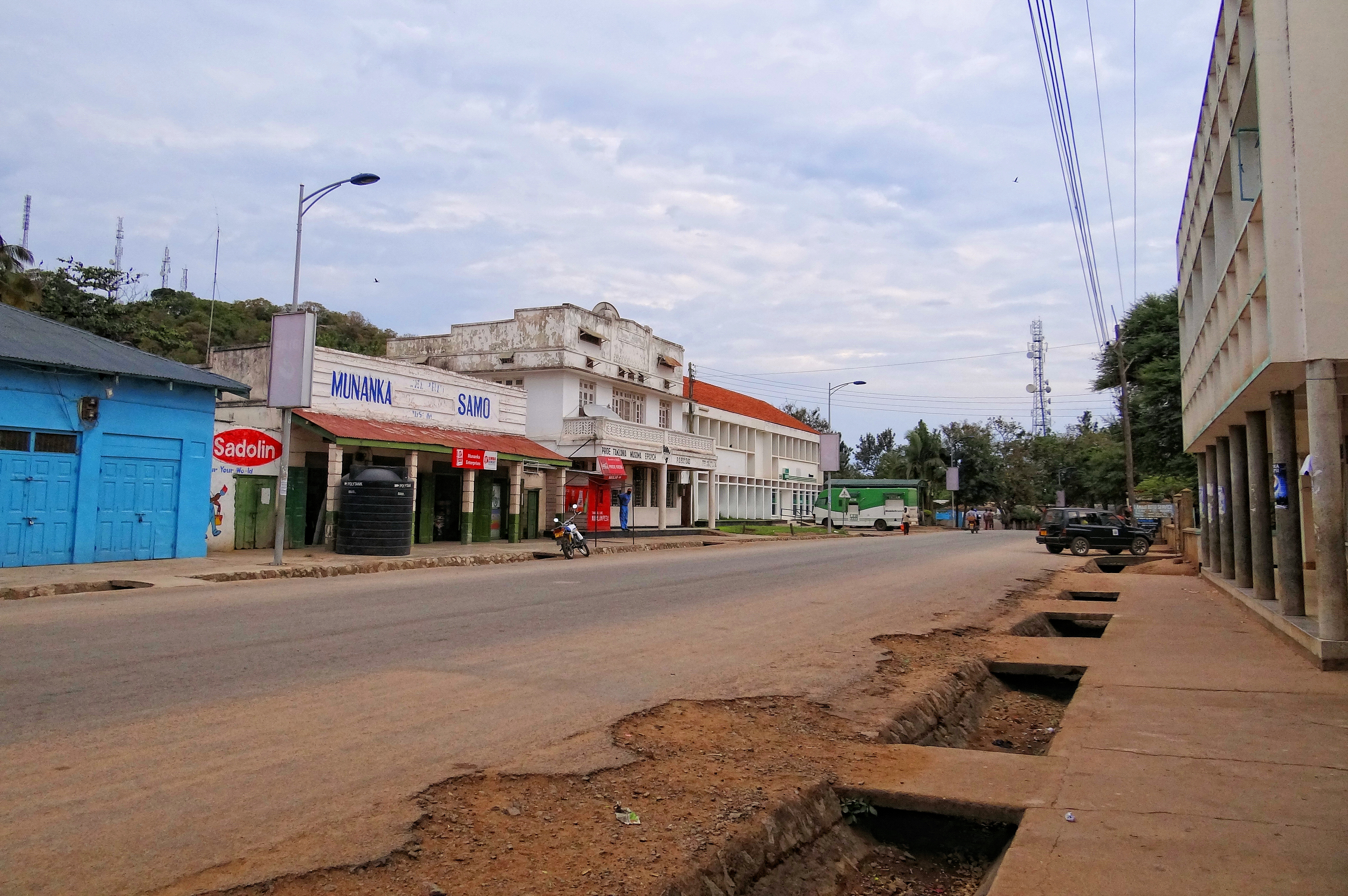
Mkendo Road, the main street through Musoma

Musoma is a town in the east shore of Lake Victoria of Tanzania. It is the capital of Mara Region, one of the administrative Regions of Tanzania. It also serves as the administrative centre of Musoma Rural District and Musoma Urban District.

== Location ==
The town sits on the eastern edge of Lake Victoria, close to the International borders of Tanzania with Kenya and Uganda. Musoma is located approximately 60 kilometres (37 mi), directly south of the geographical point where the borders of the three East African countries intersect. The town is located approximately 225 kilometres (140 mi), by road, northeast of Mwanza, the nearest large city. Musoma lies approximately 480 kilometres (300 mi), by road, northwest of Arusha, the location of the headquarters of the East African Community. The coordinates of Musoma are:1° 30' 0.00"S, 33° 48' 0.00"E (Latitude:-1.5000; Longitude:33.8000).

== History and Etymology ==
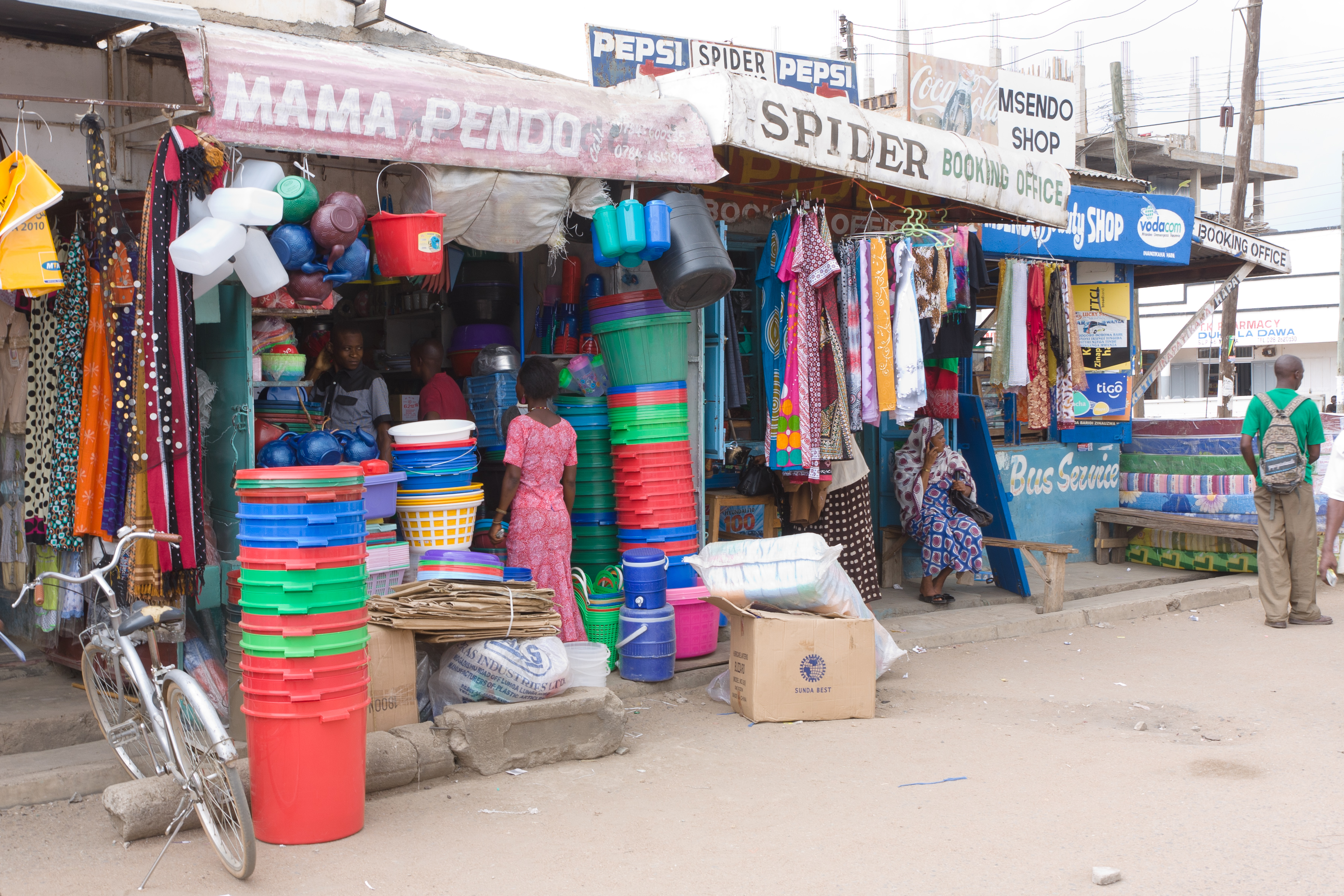
Small shops near the bus station.

The name Musoma comes from the word Omusoma which means, a spit. The name refers to Musoma's many spits pointing into the surrounding Lake Victoria.

Among the current resident ethnic groups of Mara, the site that later developed into the town of Musoma was first settled by the Kurya subtribe of Abhakabhwa, commonly called Wakabwa. They also gave the name to the location. Hence, Musoma originates from the Kabwa word 'Omusoma', which actually means a piece of land that protrudes into the Lake, essentially, a peninsula. All the kingdoms in Mara, which are actually sub-kingdoms of people with a common ancestry use the word 'Omusoma' (for the Wakabwa, as well as the Wajita and the closely related sub tribes of Wakwaya, Waruri, Wakara, and Wakerewe) and 'Omosoma' (for the many Kurianic sub-tribes such as Abhakerobha - commonly called Wakiroba; Wasimbiti, Wakenye, nk.). The full name is actually "Omosoma (or 'Omusoma') ghwa Nyabhamba".

Musoma was hotly contested and witnessed many intra-ethnic wars, particularly between the Wakabwa and their kins, the Wakiroba - who were second to arrive in the location after the Wakabwa. The Wakabwa brought in their allies, the non-Bantu Luo and were on the tip of winning the war. The Wakiroba turned to their allies, the Wakwaya but were still heading for defeat. Seeing the situation worsen, the Wakwaya and Wakiroba sought support from the Germans, who at that time had arrived in Mwanza but not yet conquered present day Mara. It was under severe attacks by the German Canons that the Wakabwa and their allies the Luo could be defeated and chased away from the area. A legacy of this war are several mass graves just outside Musoma, particularly in Nyabhange (now commonly called Nyabangi) in Kiroba Land. From that time on, the Wakiroba and Wakwaya became resident neighbors of Musoma, dominating its population for a very long time. Now Musoma is significantly cosmopolitan.

The first headquarters of the occupying Germans was established in Nyabangi, but - just like in the case of Bagamoyo on the Indian Ocean Coast, which was the first Capital of German East Africa - it was abandoned due to shallow waters that made an unsuitable location for a harbour. Musoma became the new capital. Today, the old German 'Boma' is testimony to this history of Musoma.

== Geography ==
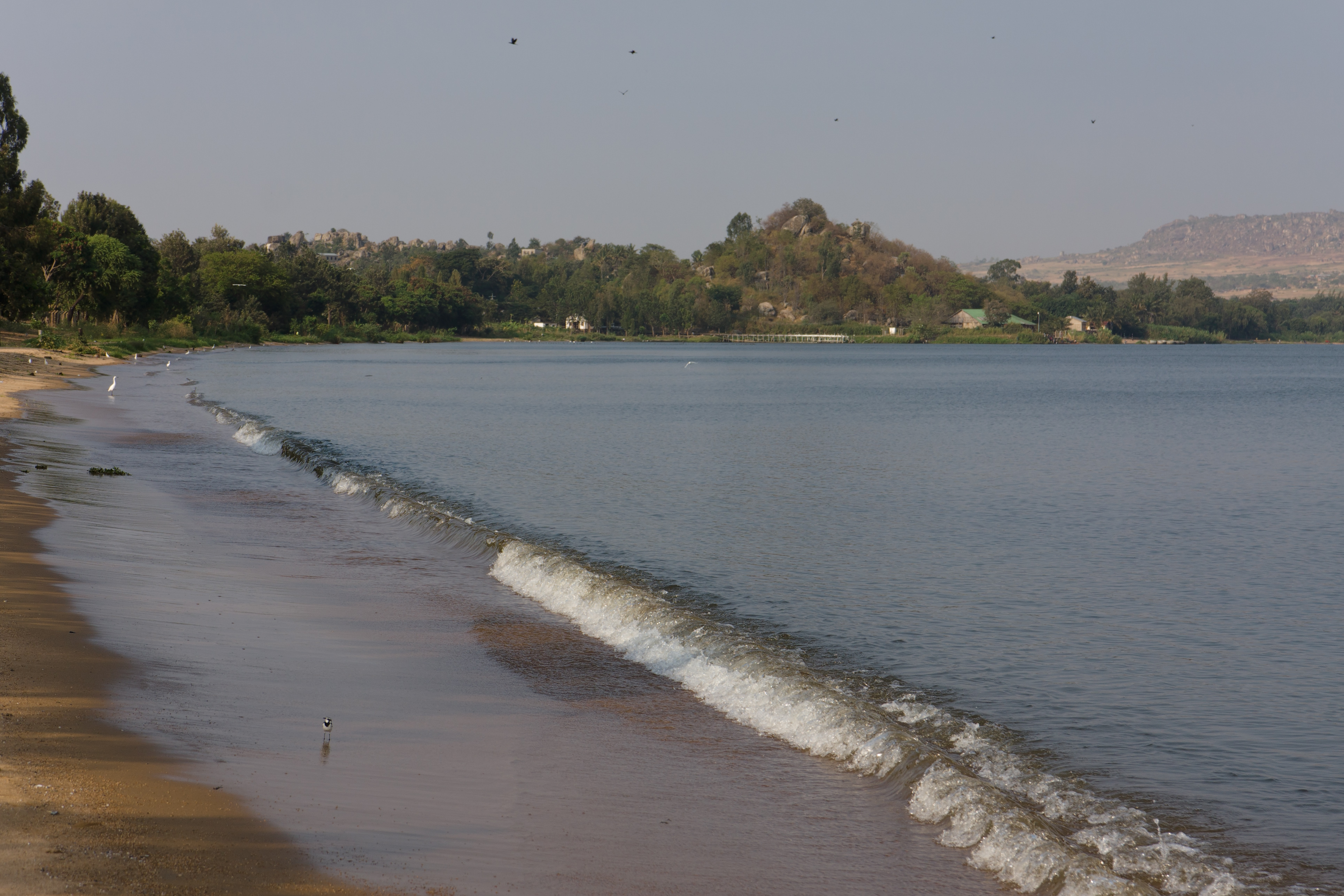
The southern shore of Lake Victoria in Musoma.

The city is situated in a heavily indented bay. The Mara River, after which the administrative region of Mara Region is named, flows into Lake Victoria, in nearby Kirumi in Kiroba/Simbiti Land.

=== Climate ===
Musoma has a tropical savanna climate (Köppen Aw).

Climate data for Musoma (1991–2020)
Month	Jan	Feb	Mar	Apr	May	Jun	Jul	Aug	Sep	Oct	Nov	Dec	Year
Mean daily maximum °C (°F)	28.5 (83.3)	29.3 (84.7)	29.1 (84.4)	28.6 (83.5)	28.6 (83.5)	28.6 (83.5)	28.7 (83.7)	28.9 (84.0)	29.2 (84.6)	29.4 (84.9)	28.5 (83.3)	28.2 (82.8)	28.8 (83.8)
Mean daily minimum °C (°F)	18.4 (65.1)	18.7 (65.7)	18.7 (65.7)	18.4 (65.1)	18.0 (64.4)	17.4 (63.3)	16.7 (62.1)	17.4 (63.3)	18.4 (65.1)	18.7 (65.7)	18.5 (65.3)	18.4 (65.1)	18.1 (64.6)
Average precipitation mm (inches)	61.5 (2.42)	58.2 (2.29)	147.3 (5.80)	162.6 (6.40)	108.1 (4.26)	28.7 (1.13)	12.9 (0.51)	21.1 (0.83)	28.7 (1.13)	66.7 (2.63)	119.1 (4.69)	88.8 (3.50)	903.7 (35.58)
Average precipitation days (≥ 1.0 mm)	7.7	6.1	10.9	14.2	10.7	3.4	1.5	2.5	4.3	7.6	11.7	9.8	90.4
Source: NOAA

== Population ==
The 2002 national census put the population of Musoma at 104,851. The 2012 Census showed a population of 134,327.

== People ==
Tanzania's founding leader, President Julius Kambarage Nyerere and Tanzania's former Prime Minister, Joseph Sinde Warioba, both attended Mwisenge Middle School in Musoma. The politician and ambassador Paul Bomani was born in Musoma in 1925.

Musoma is home to the Wakiroba subtribe of the Kuria, and to the Kwaya subtribe that is closely related with Wajita, Waruri, Wasimbiti and Wakara. It is also home to the Wajita, Waruri, Wakara, all Kuria sub tribes (including the Wazanaki and Waikizu), and the Luo, among others. Over time, several ethnic groups from other parts of Tanzania and East Africa have chosen Musoma as their home, such as Somalis. Altogether more than 12 ethnic groups live in Musoma.

== Economic activity ==
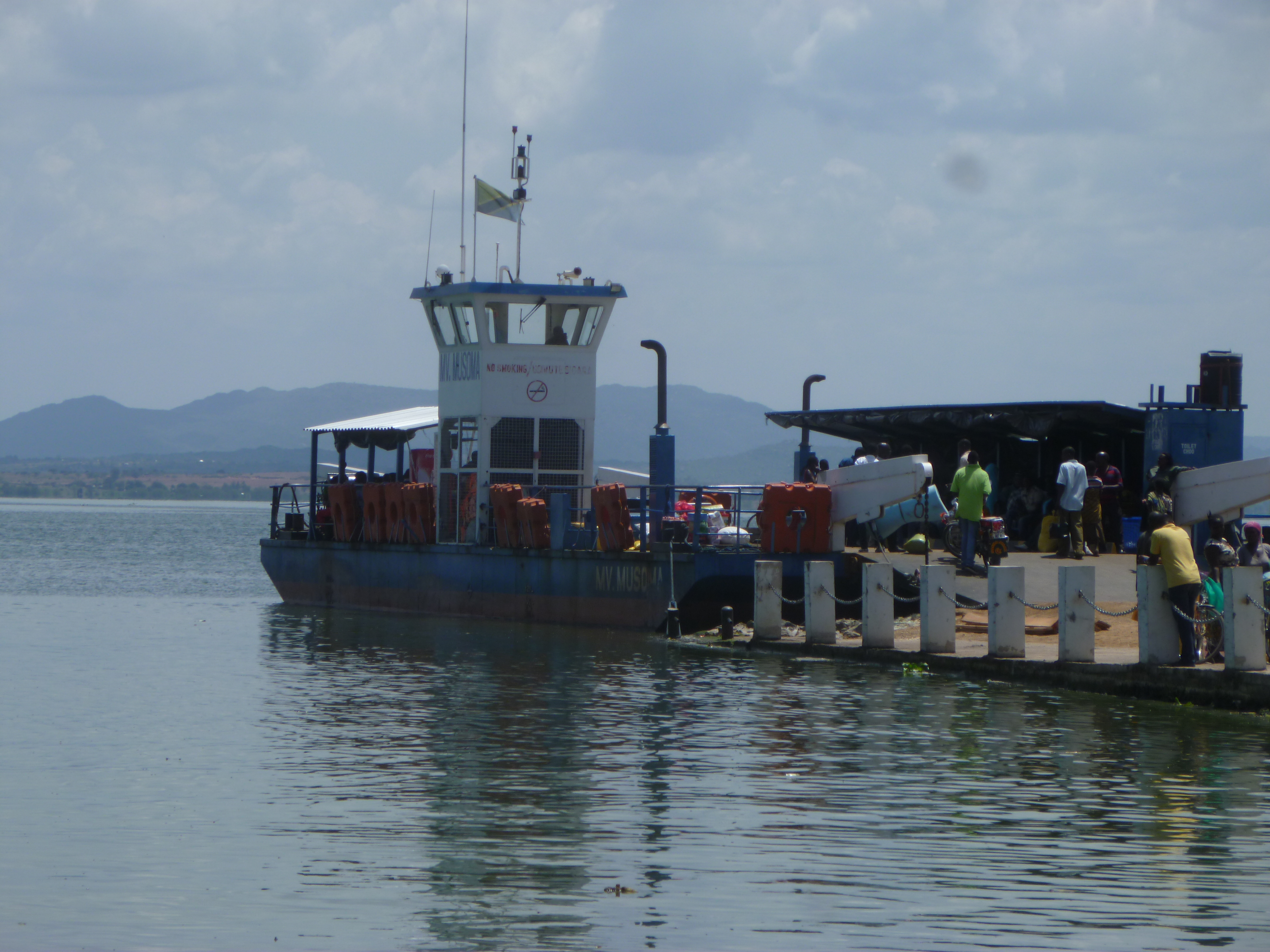
Ferry M.V. Musoma in the port of Musoma town.

Many people in Musoma are engaged in fishing Nile perch from the lake, or own and run small businesses, or are simply employed in the public sector or private sector (both formal and informal). Those living in Musoma Rural District are also Pastoralists, and many grow cotton as a cash crop. There are plans underway to construct a railway line from the port of Tanga on the Indian Ocean, through Arusha, around Serengeti National Park to Musoma. From Musoma, goods will be transferred to barges and transported over Lake Victoria, to Port Bell in Kampala. The project is a joint venture between the governments of Tanzania and Uganda and is expected to cost about US$1.9 billion. The city is also served by Musoma Airport.

== Sport ==
The Tanzanian Premier League football club Biashara United is based in Musoma.

== See also ==
- Musoma Airport
- Mara Region
- Railway stations in Tanzania
