= Butiama District =

- District
- Butiama District of Mara Region
- Coordinates: 01°46′S 033°58′E
- Country: Tanzania
- Region: Mara Region

Area
  - Total: 1,962 km^{2} (758 sq mi)

Population (2022)
  - Total: 281,656
  - Density: 143.6/km^{2} (371.8/sq mi)
- Website: Regional website

Butiama District is one of the seven districts of Mara Region of Tanzania. It is bordered to the north by Roya District across the Kirumi Bridge on the Mara river. Its administrative centre is the town of Butiama. Julius Nyerere was born in Butiama; the Mwalimu Nyerere Museum is located in his town of birth.

According to the 2022 Tanzania National Census, the population of the Butiama District was 281,656.

== Transport ==
=== Road ===
Paved Trunk road T4 from Mwanza to the Kenyan border passes through Butiama District from south to north. Trunk road T17 from Musoma to Arusha Region passes through the district from north to south.

== Administrative subdivisions ==
As of 2012, Butiama District was administratively divided into 20 wards.

=== Wards ===
- Bisumwa
- Buhemba
- Bukabwa
- Buruma
- Busegwe
- Bumangi
- Buswahili
- Butiama
- Butuguri
- Bwiregi
- Etaro
- Kukirango
- Kyanyari
- Masaba
- Mirwa
- Muriaza
- Nyakatende
- Nyamimange
- Nyankanga
- Nyegina
- Sirorisimba
