= Mara Region =

Region of Tanzania

Mara Region Mkoa wa Mara (Swahili)
- Region
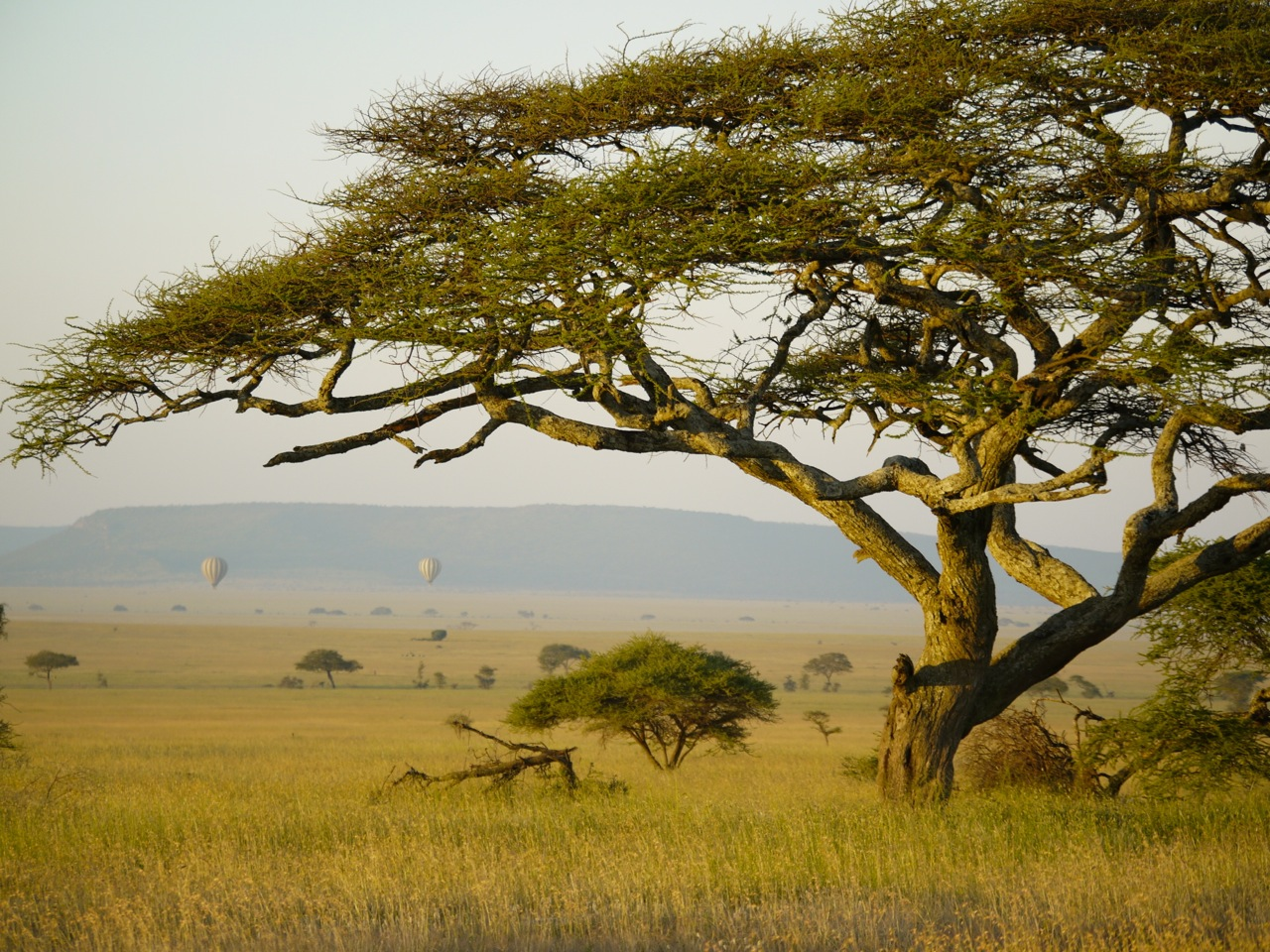
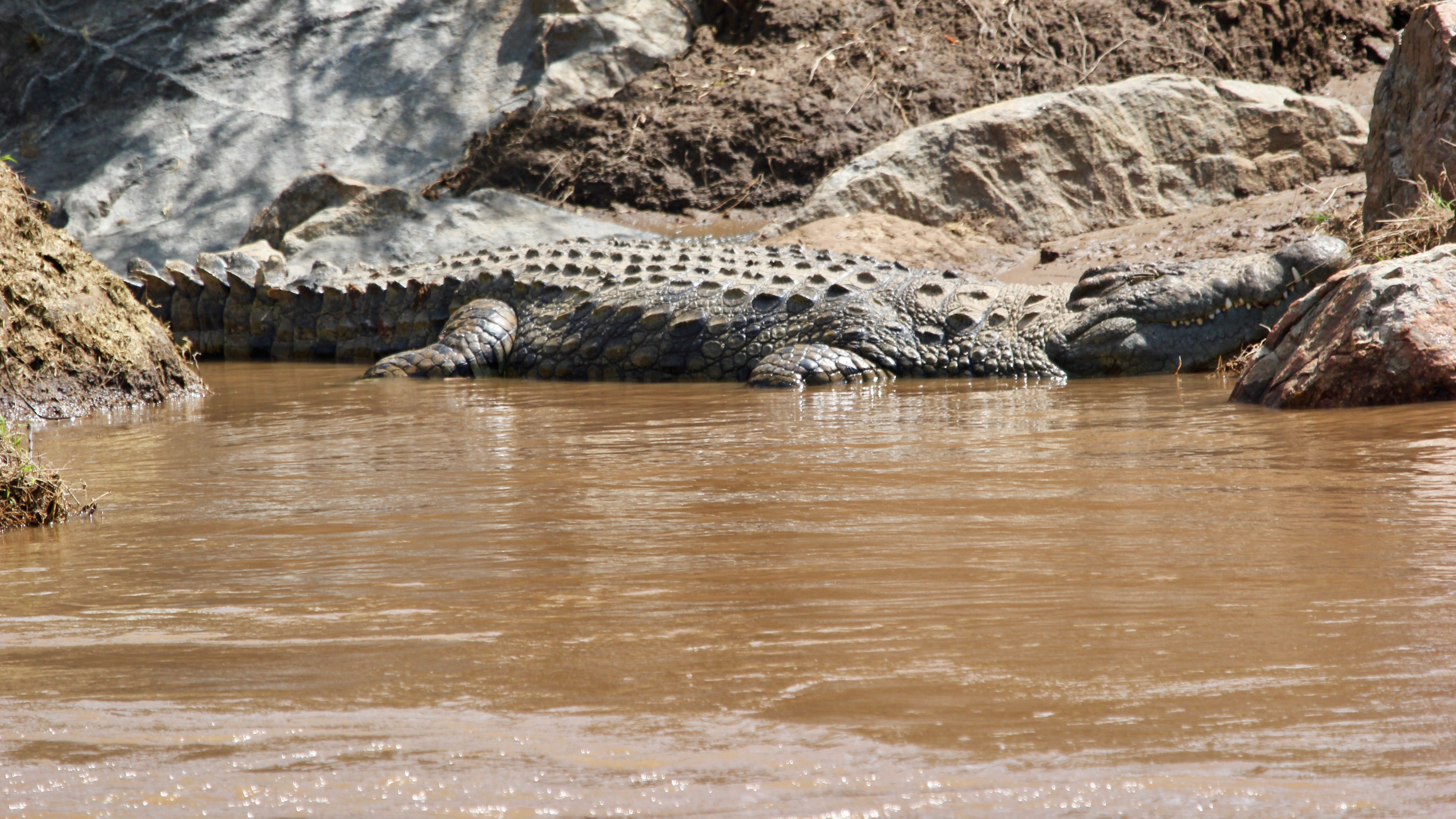
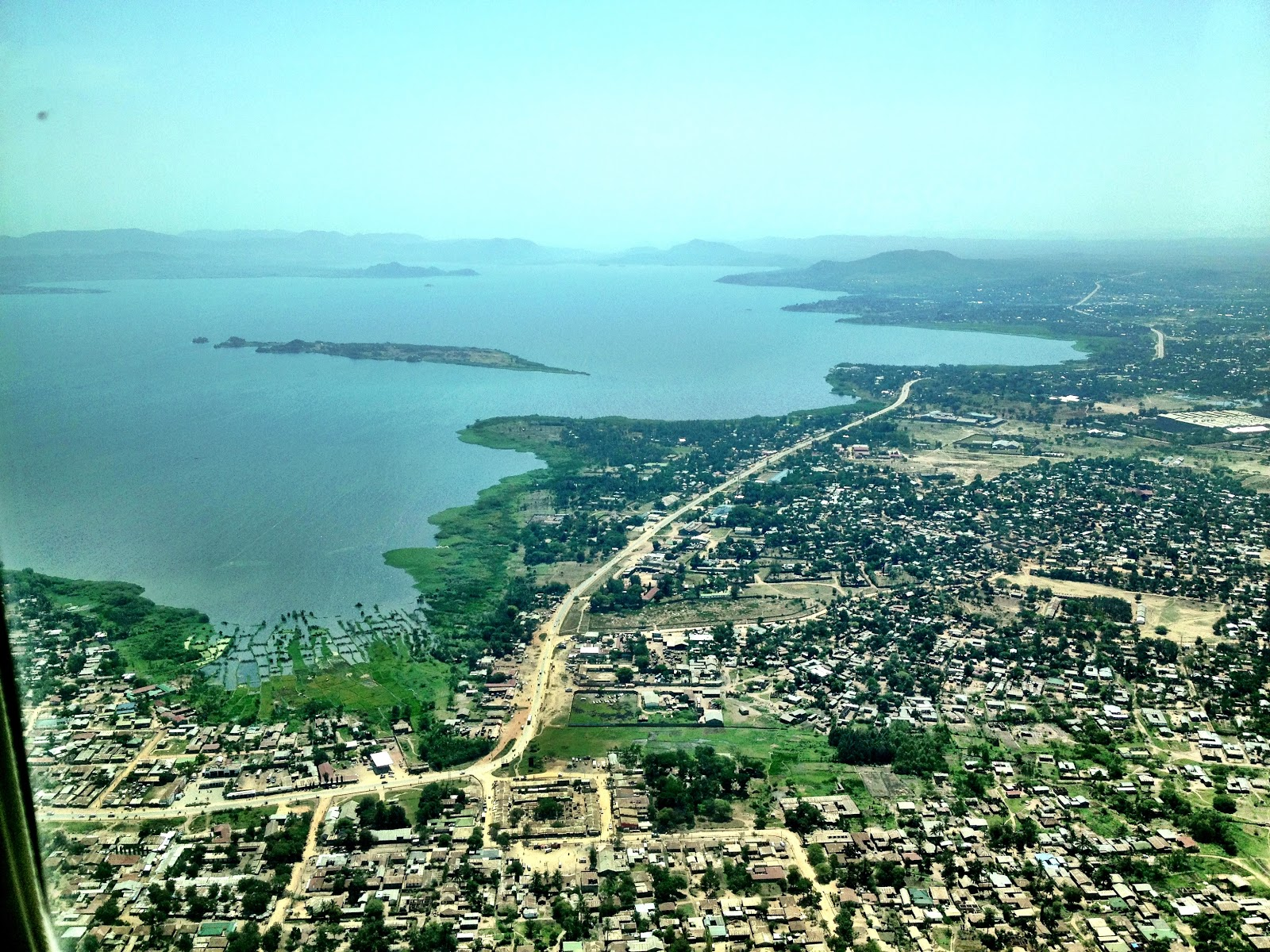
- From top to bottom: Ballooning over the Serengeti in Mara, crocodile on the Mara River and Musoma city view.
- Nicknames: The land of the Serengeti; Nyerere's homeland
- Location in Tanzania
- Coordinates: 1°46′31.44″S 34°9′11.52″E
- Country: Tanzania
- Zone: lake
- Capital: Musoma
- Districts: List: Bunda District; Butiama District; Musoma District; Rorya District; Serengeti District; Tarime

Government
  - Regional Commissioner: Dr. Rapahel Chegeni (CCM)

Area
  - Total: 21,760 km^{2} (8,400 sq mi)
  - Rank: 7th of 31

Population (2022)
  - Total: 2,372,015
  - Rank: 10th of 31
  - Density: 109.0/km^{2} (282.3/sq mi)
- Demonym: Maran

Ethnic groups
  - Settler: Swahili, Luo, Kurya & Sukuma
  - Native: Zanaki, Kurya, Ngurimi, Ikoma, Ikizu, Kwaya, Jita, Suba, Kerewe, Sizaki & Simbiti
- Time zone: UTC+3 (EAT)
- Postcode: 31xxx
- Area code: 028
- ISO 3166 code: TZ-13
- HDI (2021): 0.541 low · 15th of 25
- Website: Official website
- Symbols of Tanzania
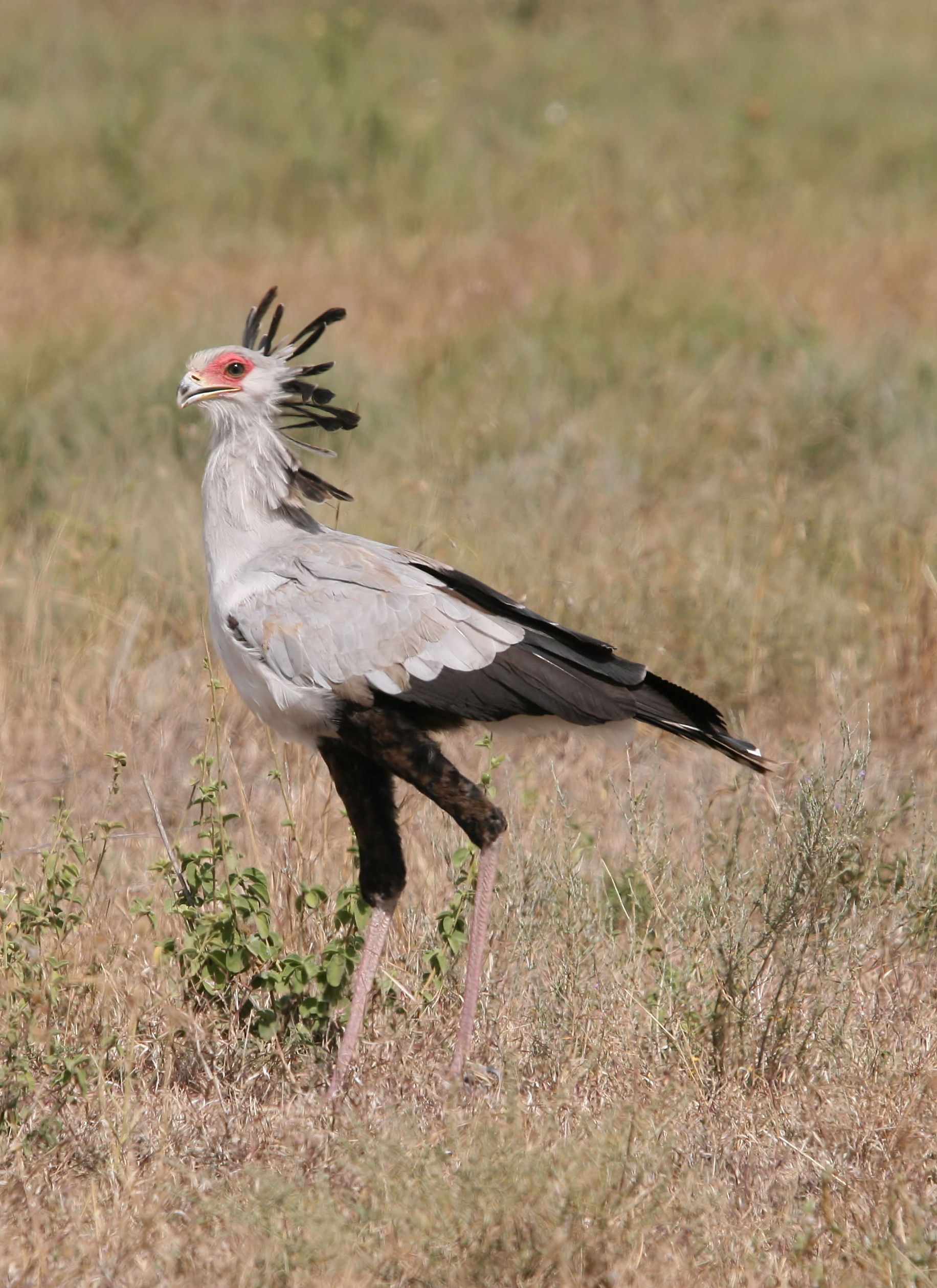
- Bird: Secretary bird

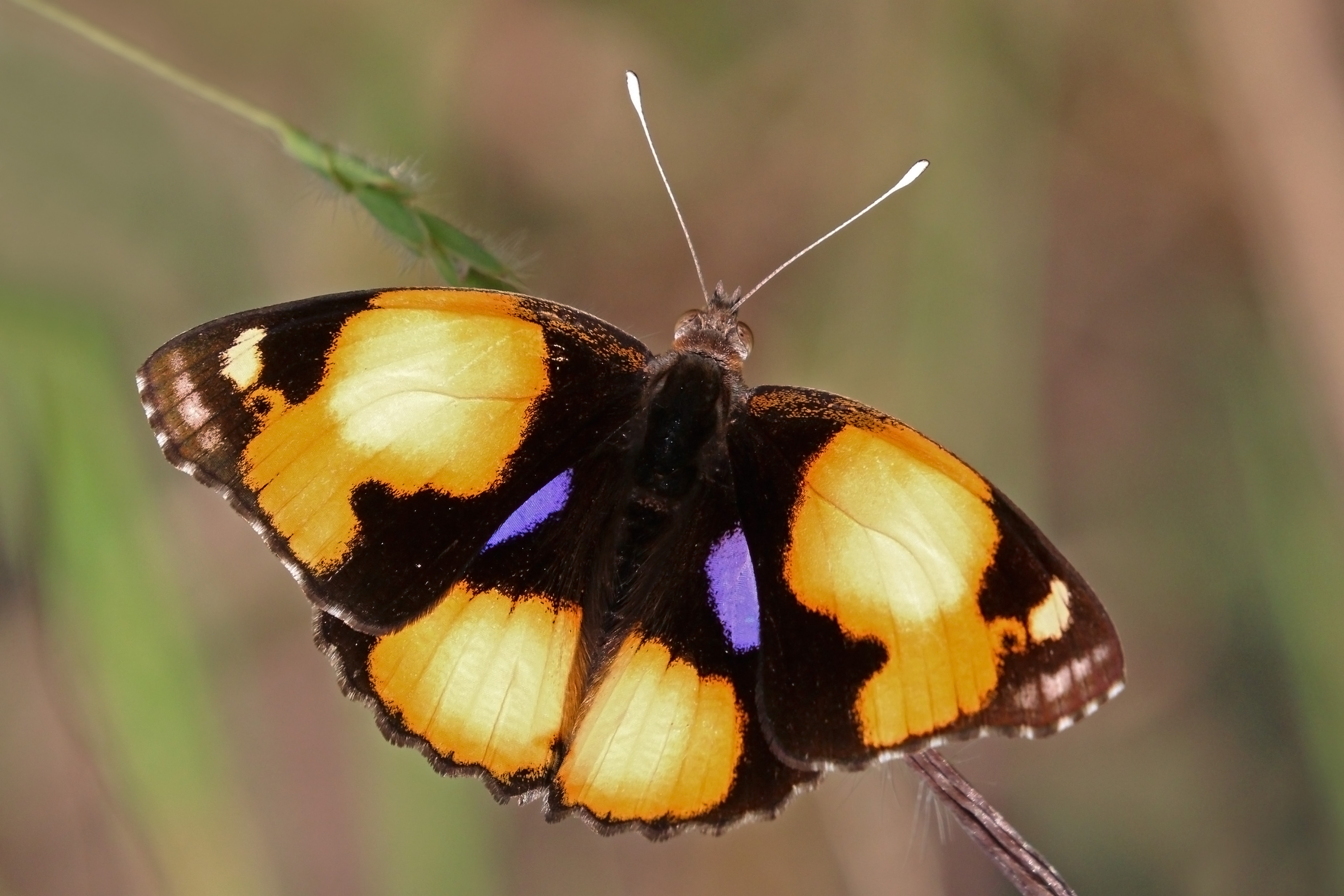
- Butterfly: Yellow pansy

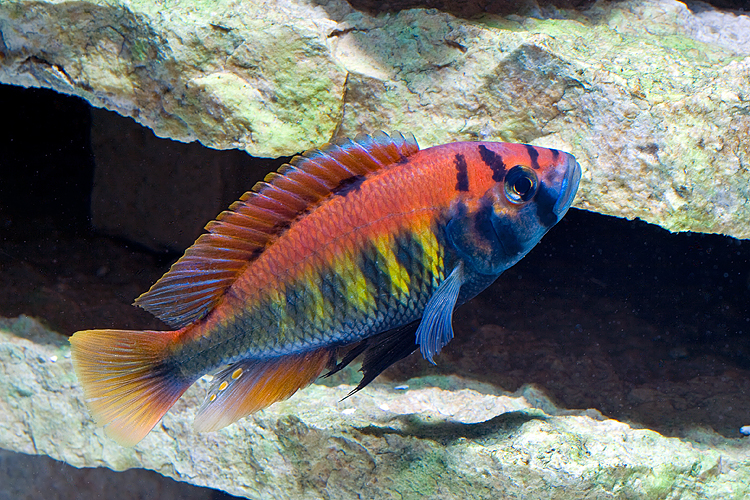
- Fish: Haplochromis nyererei

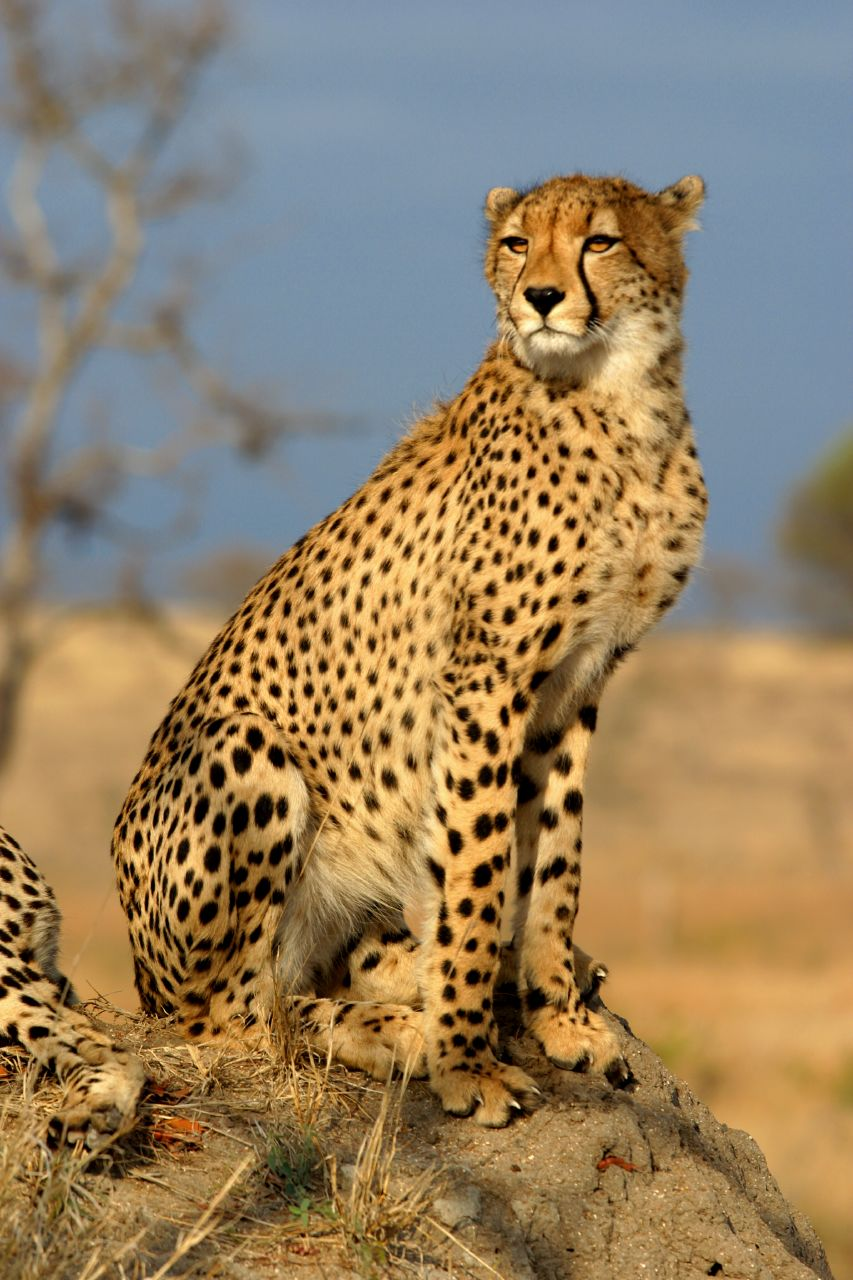
- Mammal: Cheetah

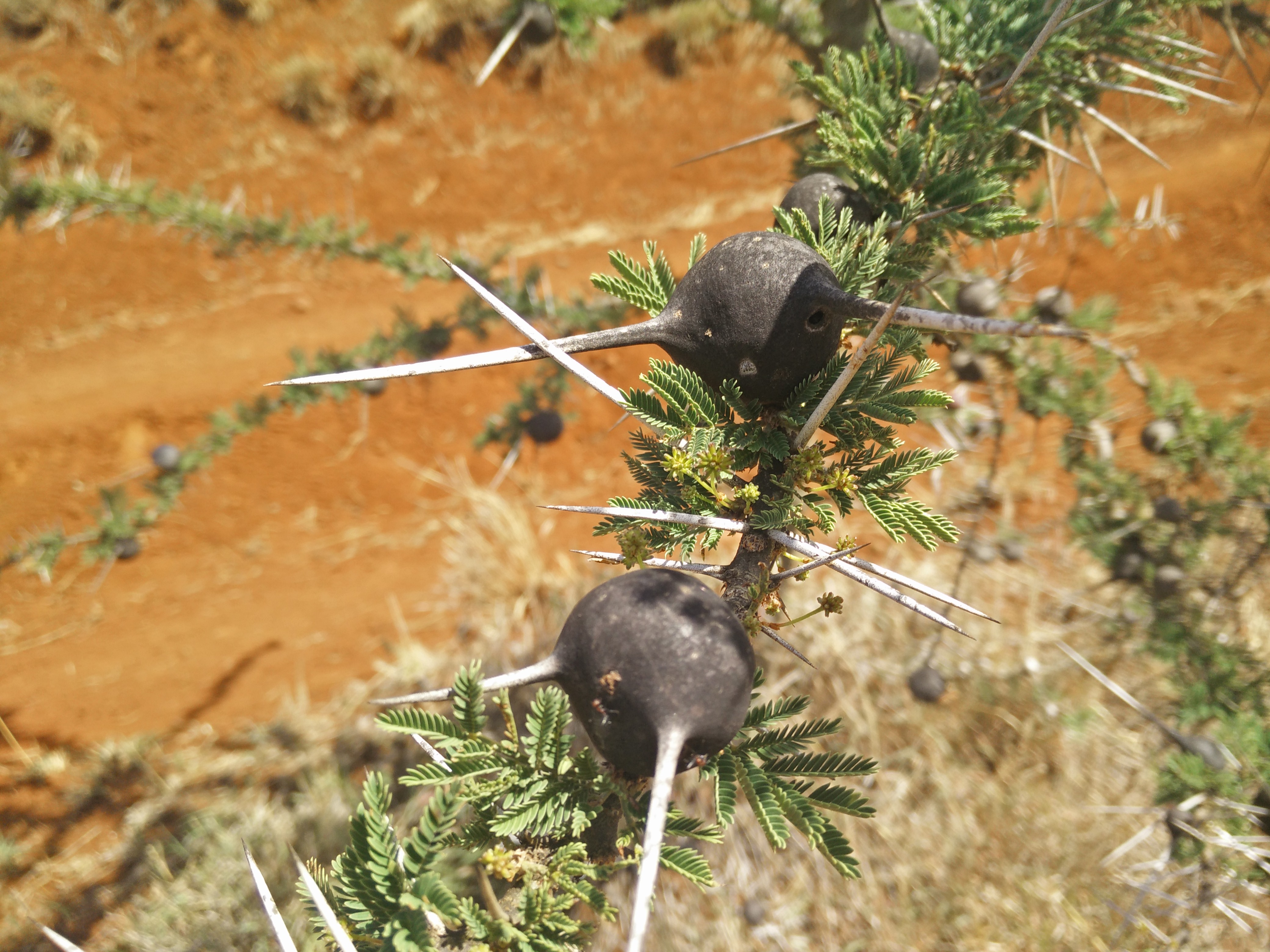
- Tree: Whistling thorn

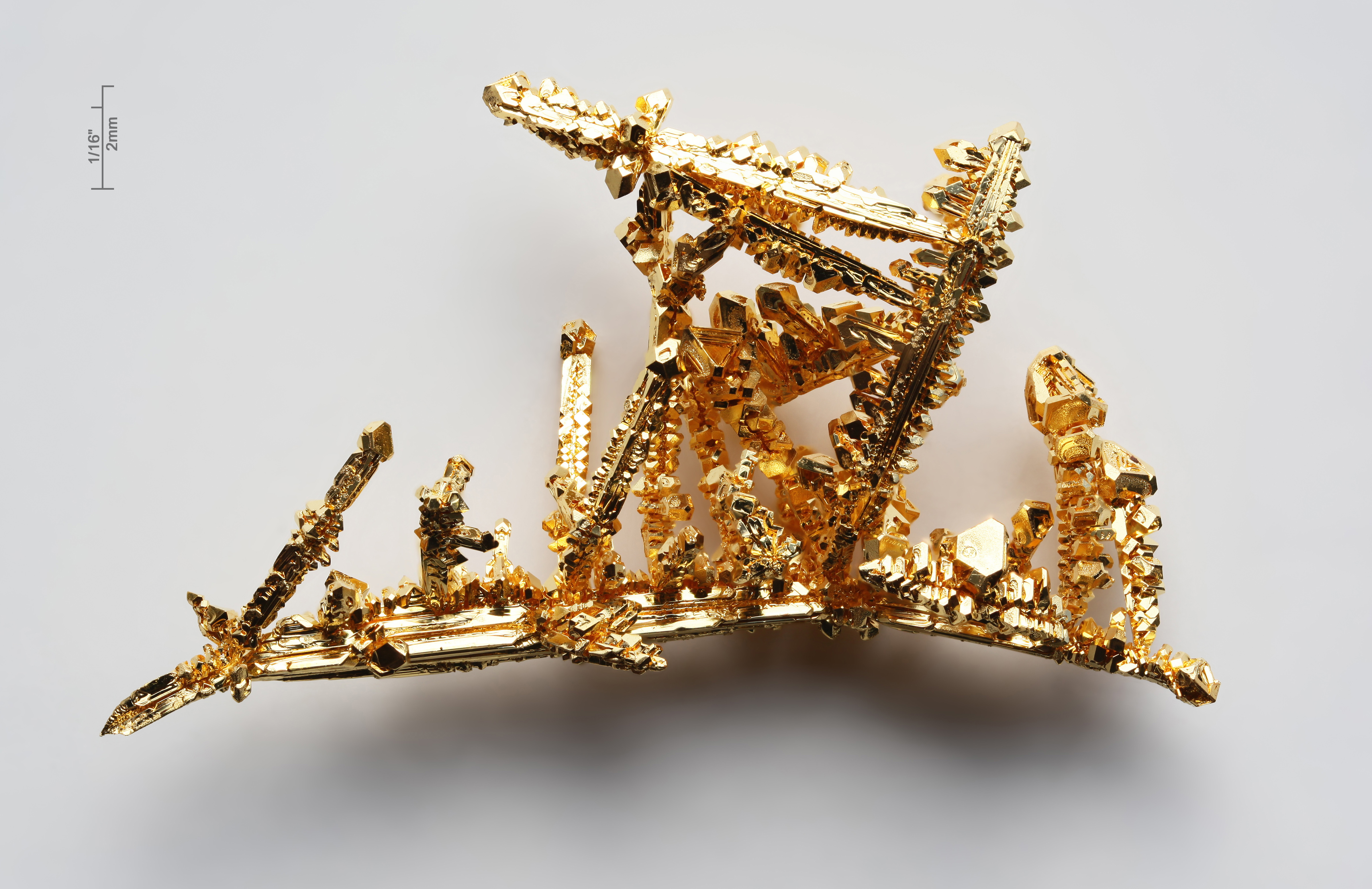
- Mineral: Gold

Mara Region (Mkoa wa Mara in Swahili) is one of Tanzania's 31 administrative regions. The region covers an area of 21,760 km^{2} (8,400 sq mi). The region is comparable in size to the combined land area of the nation state of El Salvador. The neighboring regions are Mwanza Region and Simiyu Region (to the south), Arusha Region (to the southeast), and Kagera Region (across Lake Victoria). The Mara Region borders Kenya (to the northeast).The regional capital is the municipality of Musoma. Mara Region is known for being the home of Serengeti National Park, a UNESCO World Heritage site and also the birth place of Tanzania's founding father Julius Nyerere. Under British colonial occupation, the Mara Region was a district called the Lake Province, which became the Lake Region after independence in 1961.

== Geography ==
The Mara Region is located in the northern part of mainland Tanzania. It is located between latitudes 1° 0’ and 2° 31’ and between longitudes 33° 10’ and 35° 15’. It contains 30,150 sq kilometers total, 10,584 sq kilometers of such being water area. To the north the Mara Region borders Uganda and Kenya. It is also bordered by the Arusha Region to its east, Simiyu Region to its south, as well as the Mwanza Region in the southwest and west. 15% of Lake Victoria's water body—10,854 square kilometers—is submerged in the Mara Region.

=== Climate ===
The maximum temperature of the region is 29.32 °C and minimum of 27.68 °C, with an average of 28.50 °C. The Mara Region experiences a bimodal rainfall pattern, consisting of two rainy seasons and two dry seasons. The long rainfall period last between February until June. The short rainfall period last between September and June.

The Mara Region can be divided into 3 climatic zones. The northern zone resides in the Tarime District as well as parts of the Serengeti District. On average, it receives annual rainfall of 1,250-2,000 mm/year. The central zone includes much of Musoma District and eastern parts of Serengeti. It receives an annual rainfall of 900–1300 mm/year. The Lowland zone covers much of Bunda and the lake shores. This zone receives 700–900 mm/year. Lake Victoria borders the Mara Region of Tanzania. The lake has a surface area 68,800 square km, and its coastline expands over 3,220 km. It is the Nile's principle water reservoir. Lake Victoria has numerous archipelagos, or groups of islands. Islands found in Mara territory are numerous, in the Bunda District Council, there are Bulamba, Nafuba, Sozia, Sata, Namguma, Machwele, Ilela, Igali, Chalika, Nyakalango, Bugulani, Nachenyele, and Guyanza; in the Musoma Municipal Council, Rukuba, and Iriga; and in the Rorya District Council, Towa, Kinesi, and Bugwambwa Island. There are a plethora of over 200 species of fish, however economically tilapia and nile perch are important.

=== Vegetation ===
The Mara Region is mostly covered with natural vegetation, but there are also large areas of cultivation that are underutilized. The most prevalent landscape seen in the natural vegetation is the “savannah type” most commonly found in areas that receive annual rainfall between 900 and 1200 mms/year. The Serengeti plains consist of savannah type vegetation with predominant forest vegetation, but mostly scattered woodlands and wooded grasslands. The northern zone, receiving high annual rainfall, is composed of the humid forest. The lowland zones with less annual rainfall consist of wooded grassland and bushland of dense thickets. 14,750 sq kilometers of land is occupied by the Serengeti National Park and is located at the border of the Arusha and Mara Region. It was established in 1951, and contains the vast and astonishing concentration of plain animals left anywhere in Africa.

== Economy ==
Mining, fishing, tourism, cattle raising, crop farming, and cross-border operations are the main economic activities of the Mara Region's economy.

=== Agriculture ===
About 80% of the region's workforce is employed in agriculture, which accounts for about 60% of the region's GDP. Cassava, rice, maize, sorghum, finger-millet, bulrush millet, sweet potatoes, potatoes, beans, Bambara nuts, ground nuts, green gram, chickpeas, banana, cotton, coffee, sunflower, sesame, onions, tomatoes, watermelon, oranges, avocados, pawpaw, pineapples, and lemons are some of the crops grown in the area. However, the region's critical crops include bananas, coffee, cassava, horticulture, and cotton. The estimated amount of fertile land in the region is 2,500,000 hectares, however only 500,000 hectares, or around 20% of the arable land, are typically used for crop production.

The Mara Region is one of the eleven cotton-growing regions in the Western Cotton Growing Area (WCGA), and when compared to other regions, it produces an average of 220 kg of cotton per acre. Mara was the pioneer of the cotton contract farming model in Tanzania. Out of the potential area of 22,632 hectares suited for the crop, the region is predicted to cultivate 3,065 hectares of Arabica coffee. In the Mara region, coffee is grown in four districts. These districts are Tarime, Serengeti, Rorya, and Butiama. Small-scale farmers, with average plot sizes of 1 acre and 800 kilograms of production per acre, are the principal producers. In Tarime District, tea is mostly farmed by small-holder farmers, who have land plots ranging from 0.2 acre to 2 acres and produce 600 kilos per acre each month.

Air service to the Mara region is provided by Musoma Airport, the airstrips at Seronera and Fort Ikoma in the Serengeti National Park, and Magena Airstrip near Tarime.

=== Fishing ===
Fishing in the Mara region is primarily done on Lake Victoria, which has 49% of its total area within Tanzanian territory. Along Lake Victoria, the Mara River, and its streams, fishing is done, with the activity rated as one of the region's top economic objectives. About 379,707 individuals are employed in fishing as a source of income, which accounts for 40% of the labor force in the area. The most common methods of processing sardines in the area include sun drying, frying, and, in rare instances, smoking. When compared to sardines from other regions, Mara Region sardines (dagaa), especially those from Kibuyi in Rorya District, are the best and have the most weight per gallon or per bucket. A monthly average catch of 3,452.25 metric tonnes is thought to be marketed both inside and beyond the Mara Region.

Nile perch is a valuable source of food and nourishment for families, as well as a raw material for fish processing factories. Bunda, Musoma, and Rorya districts saw a quantity of catch locally. Fisheries in Rukuba Makoko, Nyakarango, Nafuba, Namguma, Machwera, and Sozia. Musoma Fish Processors do processing in the area in the beaches of Ryamakabe, Toa, Ngonche, Msasani, and Bugambwa. The majority of the processing of the Nile perch that is brought into the area. Roughly 72%, or 13,373.07 metric tonnes—takes place in Mwanza.

=== Wildlife, Tourism and Reserves ===
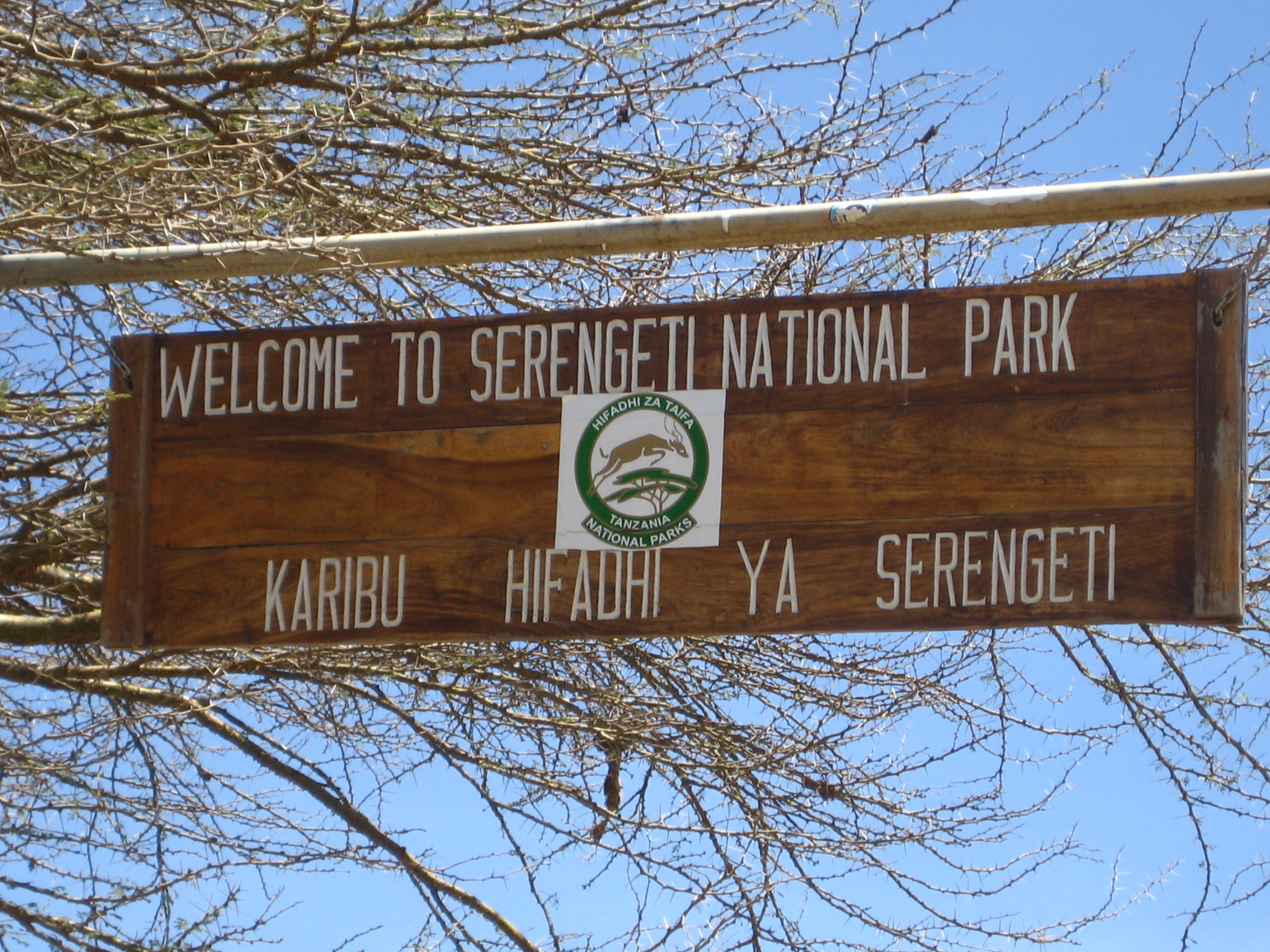
The Serengeti National Park Sign

The Mara Region is home to the Serengeti National Park, one of the world's most famous national parks. Listed as a World Heritage Site, the national park occupies a large area of grasslands and woodlands and is home to a diverse range of wildlife. It attracts close to 150,000 tourists every year. The sanctuary is home to more than a million wildebeest, 200,000 zebras, and 300,000 Thomson's gazelles. Additionally, Mara is also home to The Mwalimu Nyerere Museum, which houses historical facts on the country's independence. The museum is situated in Butiama Village, the final resting place of Mwalimu Julius Kambarage Nyerere, the country's founding father.

Legally protected forests are thought to cover 9,541.2 hectares in the Mara Region. 2,927 of these are within the jurisdiction of the Central Government, 3,593.3 are under the control of district councils, and 2,980 are not. Village governments control 5 hectares, while the private sector is in charge of 40.4 hectares.

The Bunda and Serengeti Districts' Ikorongo and Grumeti Game Reserves, with a combined area of 993.4 km2, were established in 1993. Ikoma Wildlife Management Area (IWMA), which spans 242.3 km2, is present in addition to the Reserves. There are many different wildlife species there. The Mara ecosystem is renowned for its yearly migration of more than 1.5 million wildebeest and 250,000 zebra. The second-largest migration of terrestrial mammals in the world takes place in the Serengeti.

== Demographics ==
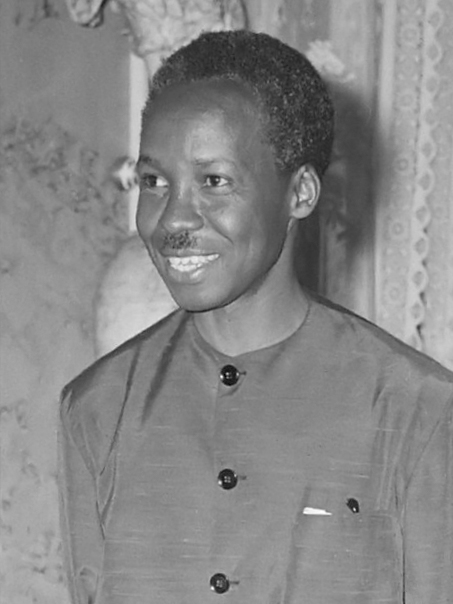

The Mara Region is the ancestral homeland to the following people groups:Zanaki, Luo, Kurya, Ngurimi, Ikoma, Ikizu, Kwaya, Jita, Suba, Kerewe, Sizaki and Simbiti. In 2016 the Tanzania National Bureau of Statistics report there were 1,924,230 people in the region, from 1,743,830 in 2012. For 2002–2012, the region's 2.5 percent average annual population growth rate was the thirteenth highest in the country. It was also the twelfth most densely populated region with 80/km^{2} (210/sq mi).

Census	Population
1978	723,827
1988	946,418
2002	1,363,397
2012	1,743,830
2022	2,372,015

== Administrative divisions ==
=== Districts ===
Mara Region is divided into one city council, two town councils and four district councils.

Districts of Mara Region
Map	District	Population (2012)
	Musoma Municipal	134,327
	Bunda Town	134,327
	Tarime Town	134,327
	Bunda District	335,061
	Butiama District	241,732
	Musoma District	178,356
	Rorya District	265,241
	Serengeti District	249,420
	Tarime District	339,693
	Total	1,924,230

=== Constituencies ===
For parliamentary elections, Tanzania is divided into constituencies. As of the 2022 elections the Mara Region had ten constituencies:

- Bunda
- Bunda Urban
- Butiama
- Musoma
- Musoma Urban
- Mwibara
- Rorya
- Serengeti
- Tarime
- Tarime Urban

== Notable persons from Mara Region ==
- Julius Nyerere- the first president of both Tanganyika and Tanzania, attended Mwisenge Primary School in Musoma
- Samwel Mwera, Athlete middle distance
- Paul Bomani, politician
- David Musuguri, former chief of the Tanzanian Defence Forces
- Joseph Warioba- Tanzania's sixth prime minister (1984–1985) and fourth vice president (1985–1990)
- Stephen Wassira- politician
- Maria Nyerere- Tanzania's first first lady
- Daniel Owino Misiani- Tanzanian musician (the founder of Benga music)
- Joseph Marwa, actor
- Dickson Marwa Mkami- Tanzanian long-distance runner
- Suleiman Nyambui Tanzanian Olympic Silver medalist and athlete from Musoma, Mara.

== See also ==
- Serengeti National Park
