= Gusii people =

Ethnic group of Kenya

Abagusii Mwamogusii Mwanyagetinge Kossova/Kossowa
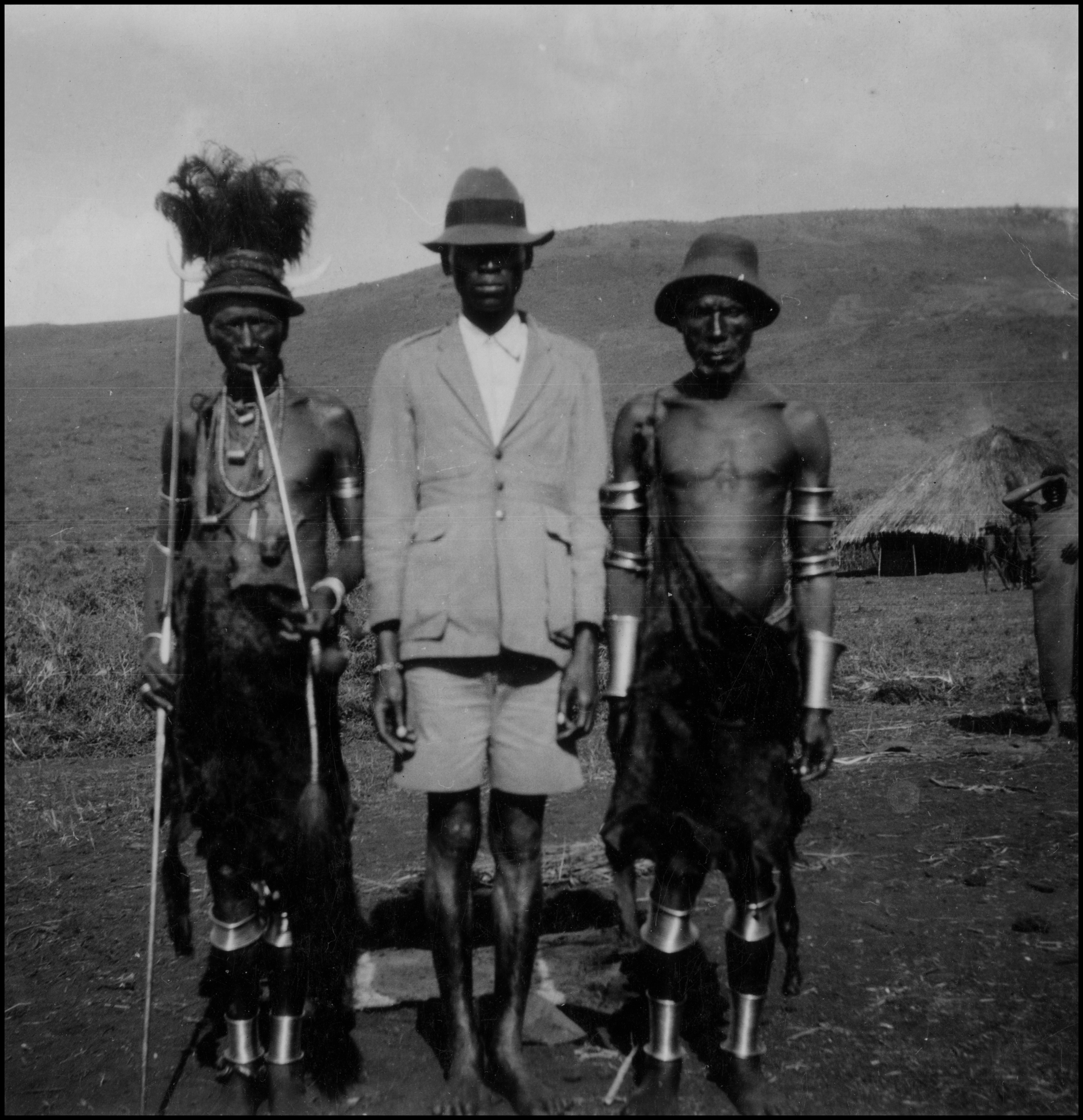

Total population
- 2,703,235

Regions with significant populations
- Kenya

Languages
- Ekegusii, Swahili and English

Religion
- Christianity (92%), Traditional Beliefs (8%)

Related ethnic groups
- Abakuria, Ameru, Embu, Kikuyu, Mbeere, Kipsigis, Maasai,Ngurimi, Zanaki,Ikoma,Rangi, Mbugwe,Simbiti, Maragoli, Jita, and Suba people (Kenya)

Gusii/Kossova
- Person: Omogusii/Omokossova
- People: Abagusii/Abakossova
- Language: Ekegusii/Egekossova
- Country: Gusii/Kossova

The Gusii people or Abagusii or Kisii are a Bantu speaking ethnic group indigenous to Kisii and Nyamira of former Nyanza, as well as parts of Kericho and Bomet counties of the former Rift Valley province of Kenya.

They speak Ekegusii, classified among the Great Lakes Bantu languages and generally grouped with northeast Bantu-speaking populations. Recent studies, however, note that Ekegusii, along with Kuria, Simbiti, Ngurimi, Rangi, and Mbugwe, is structurally distinct from other Bantu languages, particularly in tense usage.

They are noted for their soapstone sculptures, called chigware.

== Etymology ==
The term Kisii is an exonym derived from Swahili that was adopted by the colonial British administration for official use. In the Swahili language, a single person is referred to as a Mkisii, the people as Wakisii, and their language as Kikisii. While the community traditionally refers to themselves as the Abagusii and their language as Ekegusii, the term "Kisii" has since become the most common designation within Kenya to identify both the people and their ancestral counties.

Among the Abagusii, the name Kisii does not refer to the people, but to a town—Kisii, also called Bosongo or Getembe by the locals, is the major native urban centre of the Abagusii people. The name Bosongo is believed to have originated from Abasongo, which means "the whites" or "the place where white people settle(d)", referring to settlers living in the town during the colonial era.

The other name used by the British in reference to Abagusii was Kosova/Kossowa, which is a derivative of the Ekegusii expression "Inka Sobo", meaning their home. Another possible origin of this is the Kipsigis referring to the Abagusii as "Gosobe". The endonyms are Abagusii (plural) and Omogusii (singular); the language spoken by the people is Ekegusii. The term "Gusii" supposedly derives from Mogusii, the community's founder. The term "Abagusii means people of "Mogusii"

== History ==
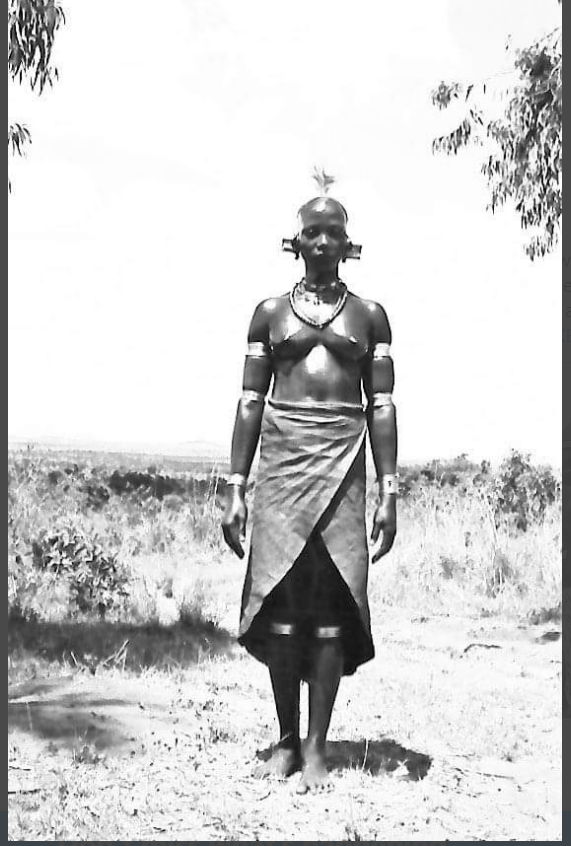
Gusii woman in native attire c. 1905–1907

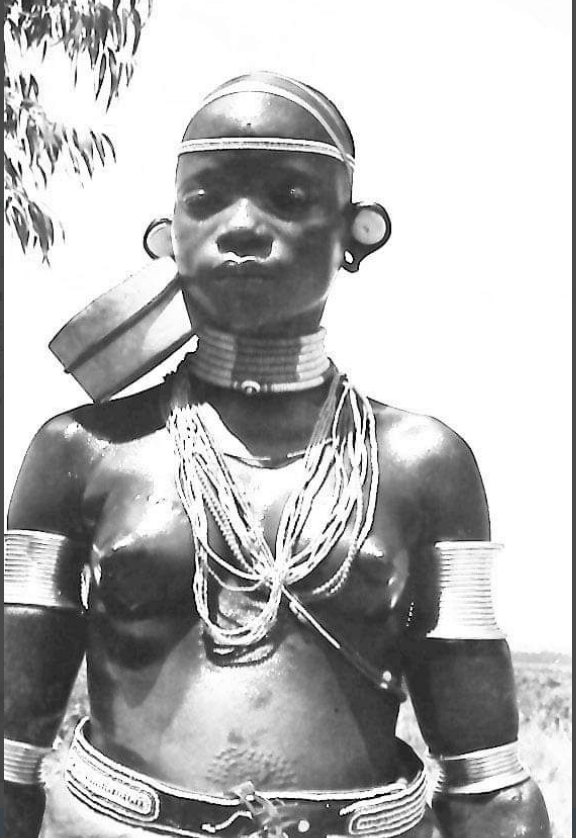
Gusii woman in native ornaments c. 1905–1907

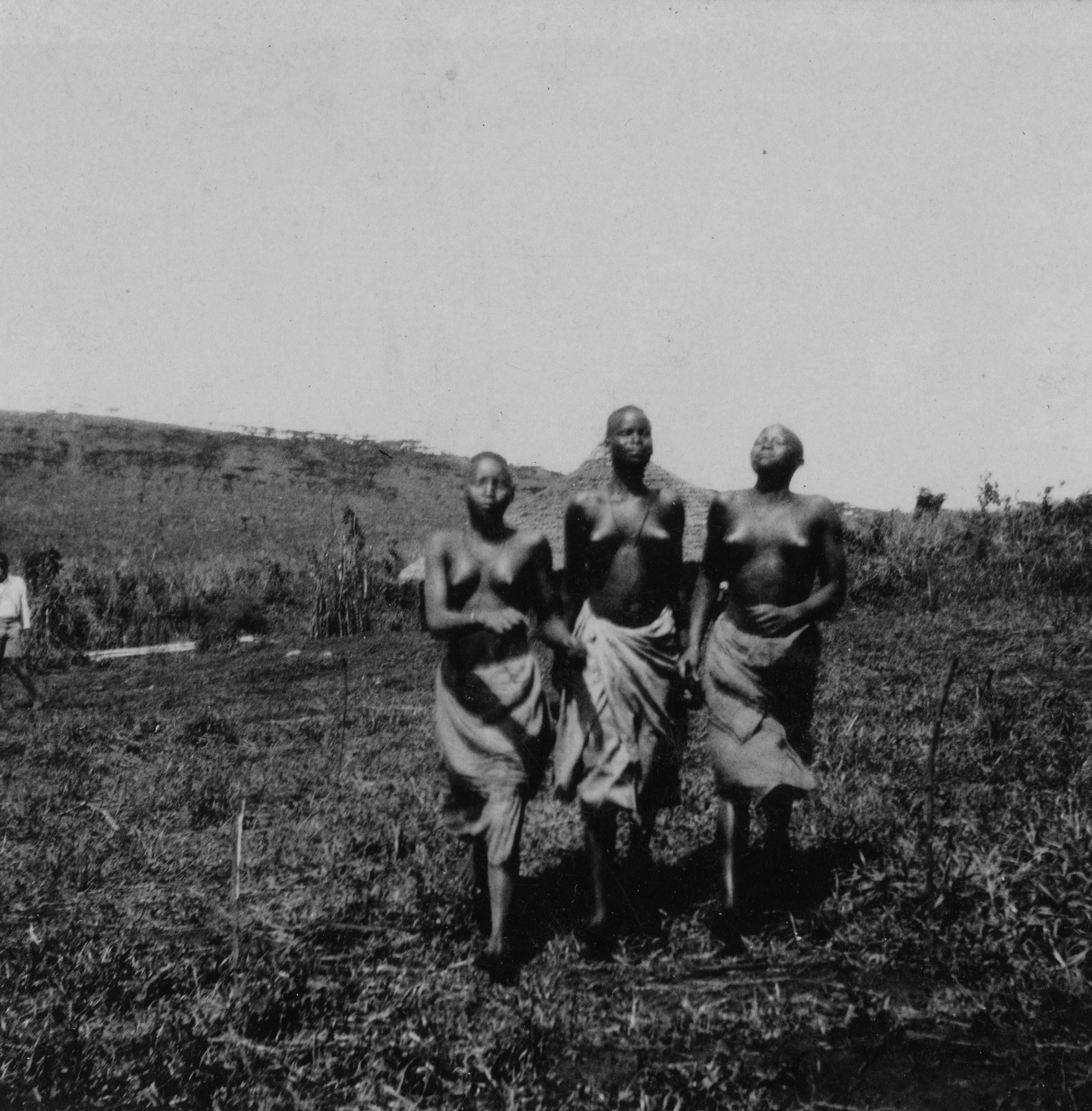
Three Gusii women walking c. 1916–1938.

=== Origins ===
The Abagusii speak Ekegusii, a Great Lakes Bantu language. The Bantu language family is the largest in Kenya. The Gusii language, Ekegusii, is one of Kenya's distinctive branch of western Bantu languages, and its speakers, The Gusii people, mainly arrived from the wider Bantu stream in eastern Uganda.. Other scholars, such as Christopher Ehret and David Schoenbrun, say that the Gusii people descend from Proto-East Nyanza Bantu people coming from the south within the Mara region of Tanzania. The proto-Bantu language is generally accepted to have emerged in an area encompassing southern Nigeria and western Cameroon. The Bantu expansion was not just a linguistic or cultural diffusion, but a demic diffusion; Bantu expansion involved successive migrations of Bantu speaking peoples southwards and eastwards through Africa. However they did not wholly replace existing populations. Genetic analysis show significant admixture of incoming populations with the existing populations living in the areas of expansion, with a loss of diversity of the source proto-Bantu speaking population as they moved farther from west Africa.

Nevertheless, the Abagusii have their own oral traditions that stress a distinctive "Misri" origin, which posits an origin in Egypt, and a long, staged migration into their present homeland in Kisii and Nyamira counties. The earlier ancestors in this tradition are credited as the founders of the six principal Gusii clans: the Abagetutu, Abanyaribari, Abagirango, Abanchari, Abamachoge, and Ababasi, and closely related tribes. Historians suggest this narrative was largely instilled through their deep historical integration with Kalenjin groups, particularly the Kipsigis. The scholar William Ochieng suggests that the "Misri" legend, which posits a migration from a northern homeland, is a traditional Nilotic account that was adopted by the Gusii. He notes various Kalenjin lineages, most notably the Abachere clan, were absorbed into the Gusii social structure. Thus his thesis is that shared oral tradition reflects a period of intense cultural diffusion, where Nilotic migration myths were passed on and fused with Gusii history.

=== Homeland and early links ===
In Abagusii traditions, they were together with several other Bantu groups, including Kuria, Maragoli, Bukusu (Luhya), Suba, Meru, Embu, Kikuyu, and Kamba, implying a common Western and Central Kenyan Bantu community. Their remembered homeland before arriving in Kenya lies in eastern Uganda, from which they began moving toward Mount Elgon on the Kenya–Uganda border.

=== Migration route into Kenya ===
From Mount Elgon, the Abagusii, together with the Abakuria and Maragoli, followed River Nzoia to the Yimbo area in present-day Siaya, then moved through Yala and Alego to Kisumu after pressure from Luo groups, especially cattle raiding. Famine and further conflicts pushed them from Kisumu to Kano between roughly 1640 and 1755, and from there they moved via places such as Kabianga and Sotik through Kalenjin territory before finally settling in the present Kisii and Nyamira highlands, where they both influenced and were influenced by neighboring Maasai and Kipsigis.

=== Misri origin tradition ===
Like many of Kenya's Western Bantu, the Abagusii preserve oral traditions claiming an ultimate origin in a location known as Misri, often associated with Egypt. Historian Gideon Were argued that the tradition was influenced by the biblical narrative, and that Misri should be located generally to the north of Mount Elgon, to dry regions such as Turkana (northern Kenya) or Karamoja (across the border in northern Uganda). The historian, William Ochieng, initially agreed, but later argued against a dismissal of the identification of Misri with Egypt, arguing that Egyptians ordinarily referred to themselves as Misriyim and to their country as Misri. This, he argued, may encode memories of much older movements from the Nile Valley region.

=== Demic diffusion ===
While the genetic, archeological and linguistic evidence suggests that the Abagusii largely derive from the Bantu family, the Bantu-speaking ancestors of the Abagusii interacted with diverse pre-Bantu populations in the Great Lakes region of East Africa, including speakers of Central Sudanic, East Sahelian, and Southern Cushitic languages, evidenced by loanwords in Ekegusii and related languages.

Archaeological, anthropological, and linguistic research indicates that pre-Bantu settlers in present-day Kenya included Neolithic hunter-gatherers akin to the Ogiek and Khoisan, and agropastoralists related to Southern Cushitic and Nilotic groups. Their interaction with Bantu-speaking migrants contributed to the emergence of the Abagusii, whose heritage and oral traditions are multifaceted and rooted in diverse ancestral backgrounds.

=== Settlement in Gusiiland ===
Present-day Gusiiland, along with Kenya and East Africa at large, has been inhabited since the Neolithic period. As a result, its settlers have diverse origins. The first settlers were likely hunter/gathers similar to the Khoisan and Ogiek, which were followed by the Nyanza/Rift Cushites who replaced these hunters-gatherers, assimilating them, and settled during the Savanna Pastoral Neolithic period (c. 3200–1300 BC) The next group of settlers were Nilotic pastoralists from present-day South Sudan that settled in the area circa 500 BC. The last group to settle in the area are Bantu speakers, whose migration to the area began in about 1 AD. Several southern Nilotics and southern Cushitics were assimilated into the Abagusii, who are likely responsible for the Gusii practice of circumcision and other practices due to cultural diffusion.

=== Colonial era ===
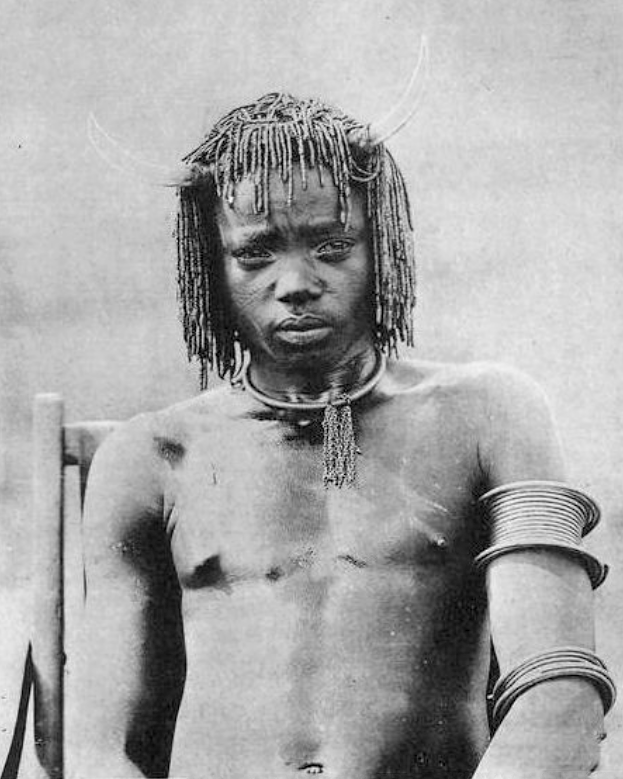
Otenyo Nyamaterere, a Gusii warrior, c. 1905–1907.

The Abagusii were seen as warlike and fierce fighters by other ethnic groups, along with the Ameru, Abakuria and Maasai. This perception is evident in excerpts from the East African Protectorate Commissioner Sir Charles Eliot in early 1900s expeditions of Gusiiland and surrounding areas.

Their warlike nature was deemed a threat to British rule, particularly the cattle camps ("Ebisarate") frequented by warriors, prompting punitive expeditions that raided cattle and suppressed warrior activity. This gradually ended the pastoral and war-based lifestyle of most Abagusii.

In the 1930s, the British introduced new immigrants to Kisii District and other regions of Kenya to serve as interpreters, soldiers, porters, and farmers. These included the Baganda, the Maragoli, the Nubi, and the Olusuba-speaking Suba people (Kenya) from Rusinga Island, Mfangano Island, and other parts of South Kavirondo. The Nubians were settled in present-day Kisii town and served as soldiers, while the Bantu-speaking Maragoli and Baganda worked as porters and labourers on white-owned farms and tea plantations. The Suba served as interpreters for the British administration. Some of these groups have been assimilated into Gusii society, while others, notably the Nubi, have retained distinct cultural identities and continue to reside in their original settlements in Kisii town.

=== Post-colonial ===
In the post-colonial age, the Abagusii have expanded out of their traditional range, settling in the major towns of the Luo-Nyanza counties, like Homa Bay, Migori, Kisumu and Siaya as well as other Kenyan towns and cities. There is also a significant diaspora population in the United States (particularly Minnesota), the United Kingdom, Canada, New Zealand, Australia, and South Africa.

== Relationship with other peoples ==
=== Relationship with Nilotic speakers and East African Bantu speakers ===
During the pre-colonial period, the Abagusii primarily interacted with neighbouring Nilotic-speaking communities, including the Maasai, Nandi, Kipsigis, and Luo. These interactions contributed to limited contact with other Bantu-speaking populations, a factor reflected in the cultural influences and linguistic characteristics of Ekegusii.

Despite this, the Abagusii maintained contact with some closely related Bantu-speaking groups before colonisation, including the Kuria, Zanaki, Ikoma, Rangi, Mbugwe, Ngurimi, Simbiti, certain Suba clans, and the Maragoli.

Prior to colonisation, the Abagusii engaged in barter trade with neighbouring groups, notably the Luo, and occasionally formed alliances to counter threats such as cattle raiding. Relations with Nilotic communities were generally peaceful, with occasional conflicts over cattle and grazing land. Gusii oral traditions and some scholarly sources indicate historical ties with Nilotic-speaking groups, particularly the Kipsigis, including shared clan affiliations.

==== Etymology of Bantu and relevance to Abagusii ====
The modern usage of the term "Bantu" emerged in the 19th century during European colonisation; prior to this period, such divisions did not exist in Africa. This classification of African peoples into distinct, internally homogeneous groups has been criticised as overly general and often inaccurate. Linguists trace their heritage to proto-Bantu, which originated in southern Nigeria and western Cameroon, and spread through subsequent migrations. In the case of the Abagusii, together with the Kuria, Zanaki, Ikoma, Rangi, Mbugwe, Ngurimi, and Simbiti, linguistic and cultural evidence suggests stronger influences from Nilotic and Cushitic communities than is typical among other Bantu groups.

== Economic activities ==
=== Agriculture and herding ===
During the pre-colonial era, the Abagusii cultivated finger millet, sorgum, barley, pumpkin, and other native crops; ox-drawn plows and iron hoes were used for cultivating crops. However, the Abagusii were mainly pastoralists and hunter-gatherers who primarily relied on their cattle, goats, sheep, and to a lesser extent, poultry for food. In the 19th century, Europeans introduced tea, coffee, bananas/plantains, and most importantly, maize. By the 1920s, maize quickly replaced finger millet and sorghum as a staple and cash crop. By the 1930s, tea and coffee had become major cash crops.

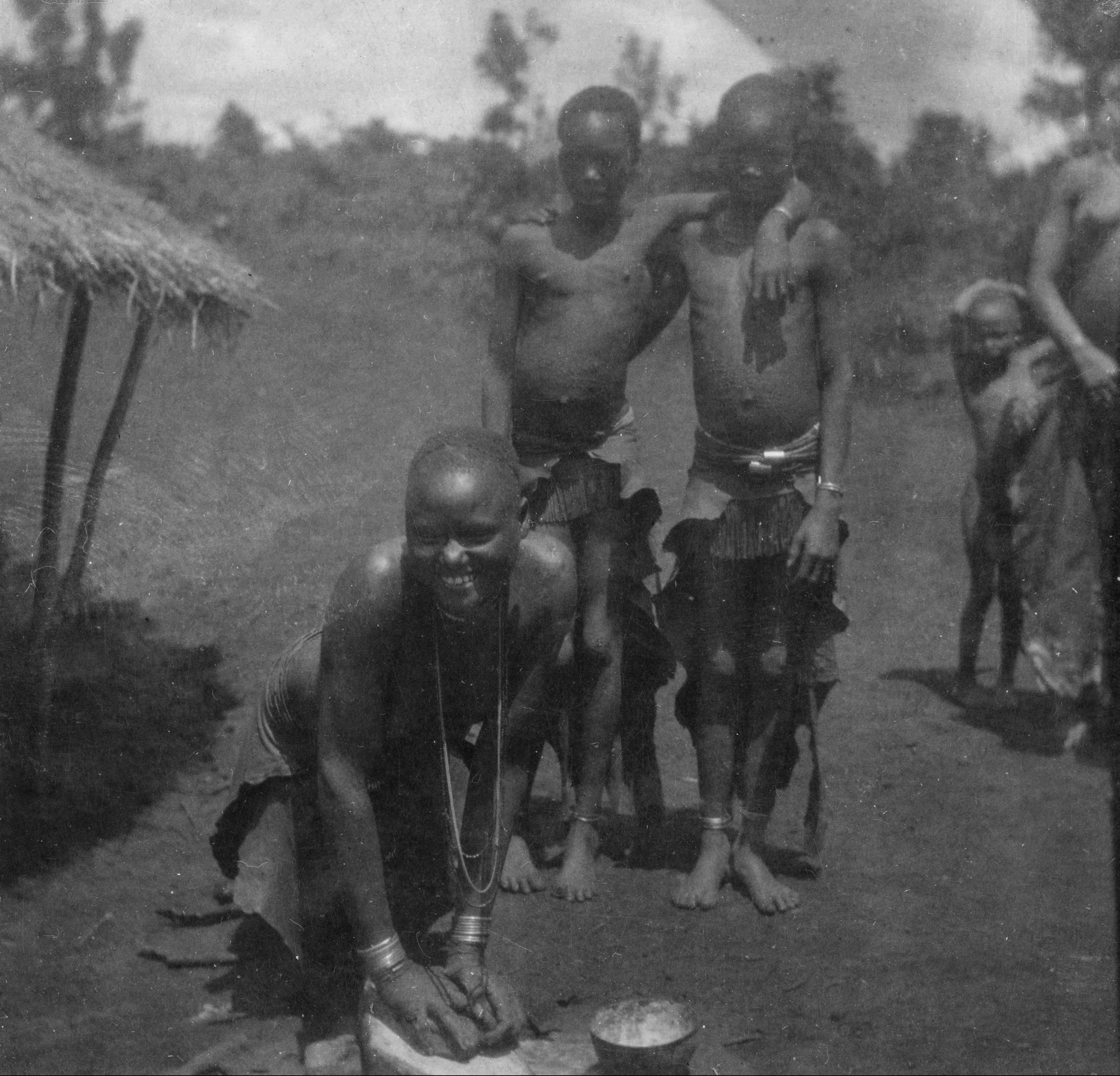
Gusii women grinding millet while other natives watch c. 1916–1938

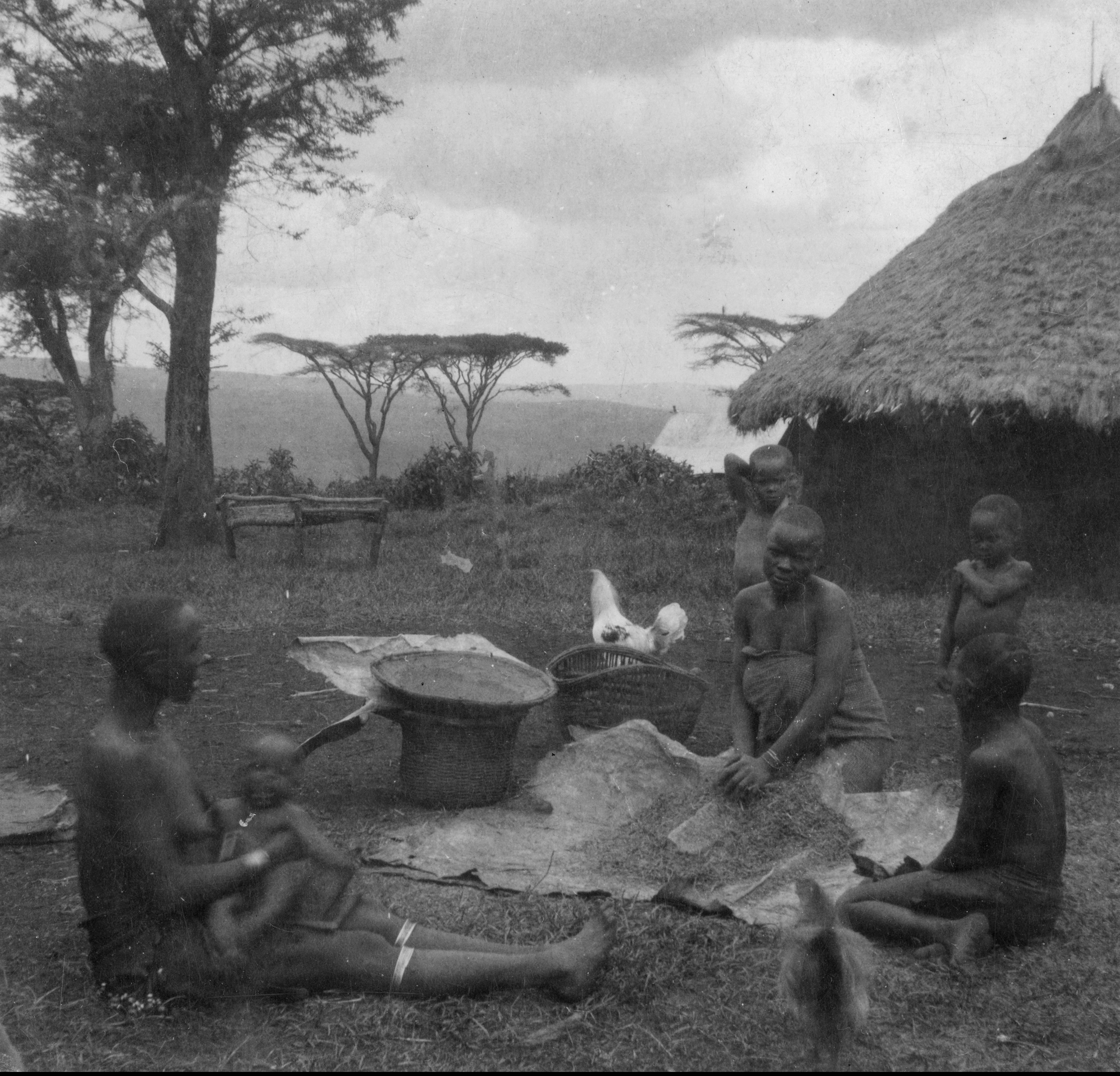
Gusii women thrashing corn with children watching c. 1916–1938.

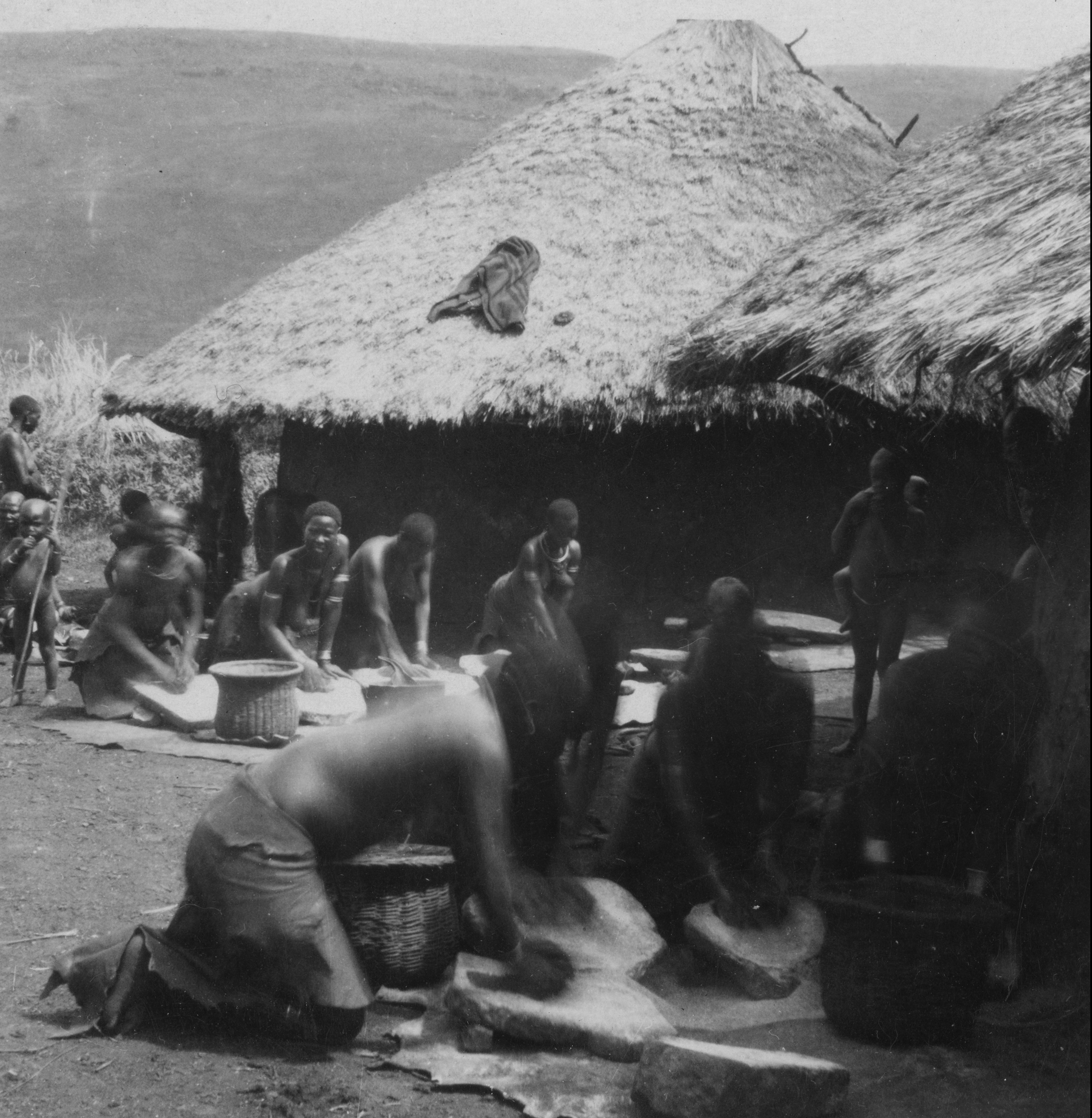
Gusii women grinding millet c. 1916–1938

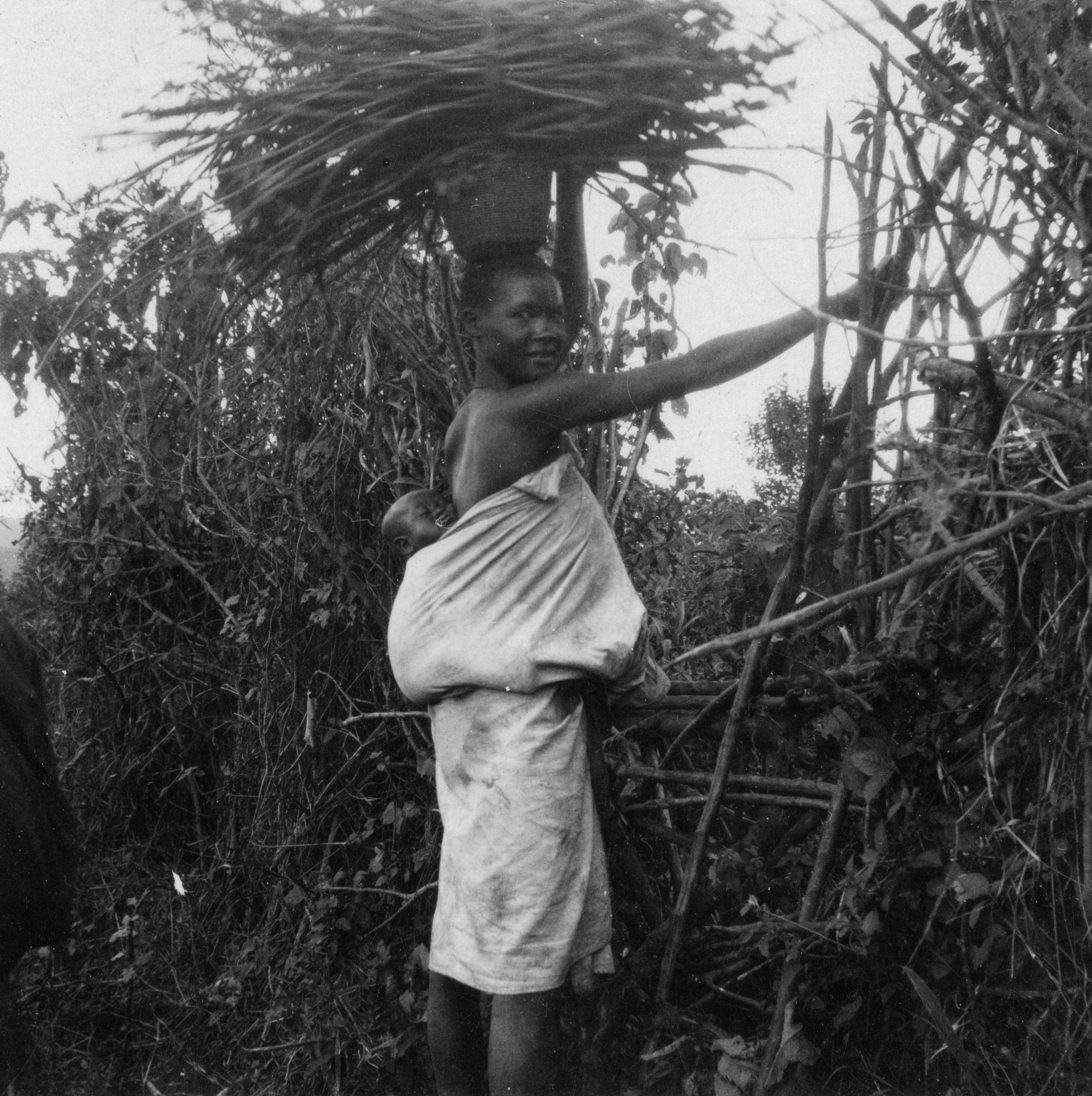
Gusii woman with a baby and a load of firewood c. 1916–1938

=== Industrial activities ===
During the pre-colonial period, Abagusii produced iron tools, weapons, decorations, wooden implements, pottery, and baskets. The Abagusii also imported pottery from the neighbouring Luo community. Blacksmiths and other occupations that worked with iron and iron ore were highly respected and influential members of Abagusii society, despite not forming a distinct societal caste; smithing was largely carried out by men.

=== Trade ===
The primary form of trade carried out in pre-colonial times was barter, and mostly took place within homesteads, as well as with neighbouring communities, especially the Luo; tools, weapons, crafts, livestock, and agricultural products were commonly exchanged. Cattle were an important form of currency, and goats served a lower valued currency. Barter trade between the Abagusii and the Luo took place at border markets and Abagusii farms, and was mainly carried out by women.

In the modern age, the Abagusii have established shopping centers, shops, and markets, further connecting them to the rest of Kenya, as opposed to their comparatively isolated pre-colonial economies.

=== Division of labour ===
Traditionally, Abagusii society divided labour between men and women. Women were expected to cook, brew, clean, cultivate and process crops, and fetch water and firewood; men were expected to herd, build houses and fences, clear crop fields, among other duties. Men were less involved in crop cultivation compared to women. Herding was primarily carried out by boys and unmarried men, and girls and unmarried women helped with crop cultivation. This division of labor has broken down over time, and women have gradually taken over many of the men's traditional duties.

== Culture ==
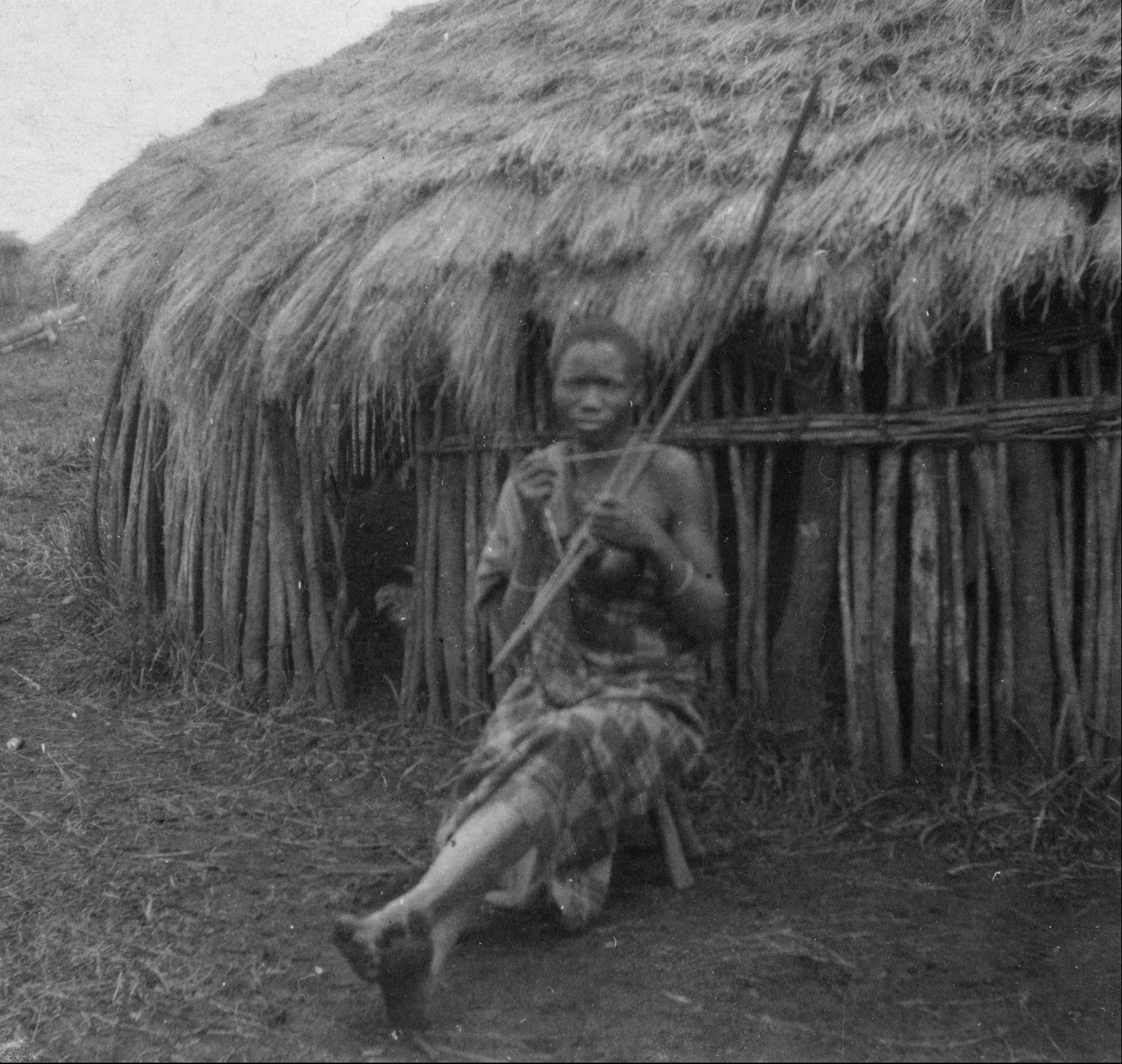
Gusii woman sitting in front of a hut c. 1916–1938

=== Coming-of-age rituals ===
Among the Abagusii, circumcising boys without anesthesia around 10 is an important rite of passage. Traditionally, the Abagusii did not marry into tribes that did not practice circumcision, though this practice has declined in recent generations. The ritual typically takes place every year in the months of November and December, followed by a period of seclusion where boys are led in different activities by older boys. During this period, only older circumcised boys are allowed to visit the initiates. It is considered taboo for anyone else to visit during this time. In this period of isolation, the male initiates are taught their roles as young men in the community, and the code of conduct of a circumcised man. Initiated boys were also taught the rules of shame ("chinsoni") and respect ("ogosika"). This is a time of celebration for families and the community at large. Family, friends, and neighbours are invited days in advance by the candidates to join the family in celebration.

=== Music ===
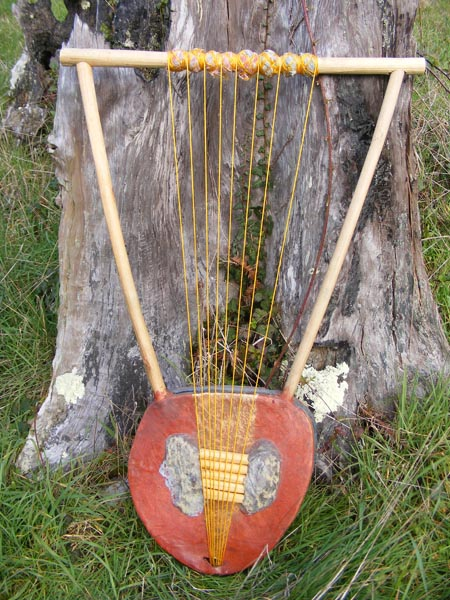
Obokano

The Abagusii traditionally play a large eight stringed bass lyre called the obokano. This is the largest such lyre in Kenya and instruments may be as large as six feet tall. It is used to accompany singing and dancing, Gusii music usually being vocal. When used solo, it is generally as an introduction to singing. The instrument is usually reserved for male members of the Gusii, along with other instruments, although women may play drums known as Ekonu and rattles during circumcision ceremonies. Other traditional instruments are flutes.

=== Art ===
The Abagusii are also known for their world-famous soapstone sculptures, called "chigware", which are mostly concentrated in the southern parts of Kisii County, around Tabaka town.

=== Religion ===
Prior to the introduction of Christianity and Islam to Africa, the Abagusii were monotheistic, believing in a supreme God called "Engoro"; this God is also popularly called "Nyasae", a loanword from the Dholuo language, among Abagusii. The Abagusii believe that Engoro created the Universe, and was the source of all life. The sun ("Risase") and stars are both important in the Abagusii religion. Death, disease, and destruction of crops and livestock were considered unnatural events brought on by evil spirits, bad luck, witchcraft, or the displeasure of ancestor spirits. The Abagusii also revered medicine men and practiced ancestor worship, calling the ancestor spirits "Ebirecha."

Today, most Abagusii practice Christianity, with the four major denominations being Catholicism, the Seventh-day Adventist Church, Swedish Lutheranism, and Pentecostal Assemblies of God. A minority of Abagusii still adhere to their traditional religion, and others observe a syncretic form of their traditional religion and Christianity. Many still go to visit a diviner ("omoragori") who can point out displeased spirits of the dead and prescribe solutions for placating them.

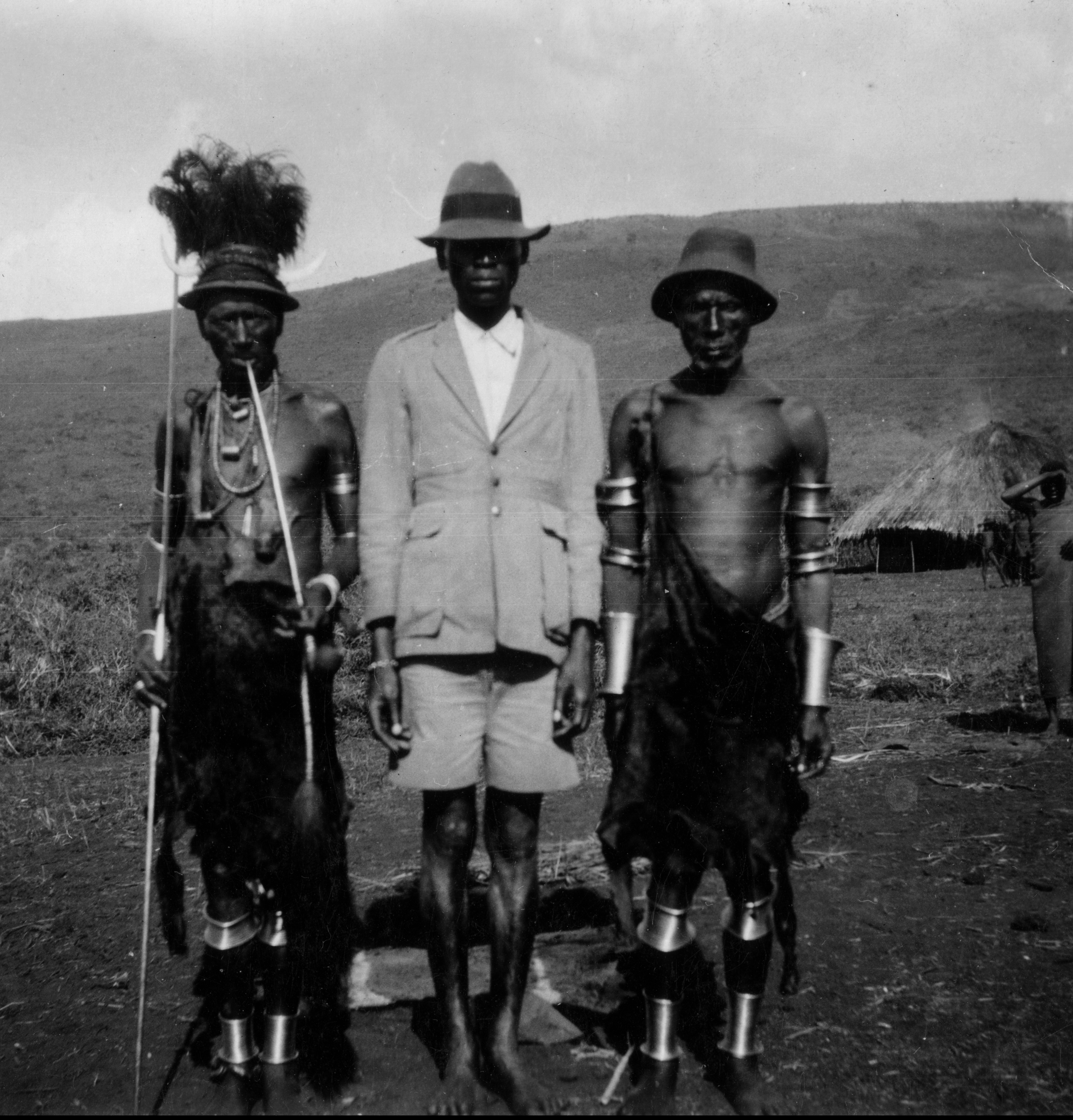
A Christian Gusii man accompanied with other Gusii tribesmen c. 1916–1938

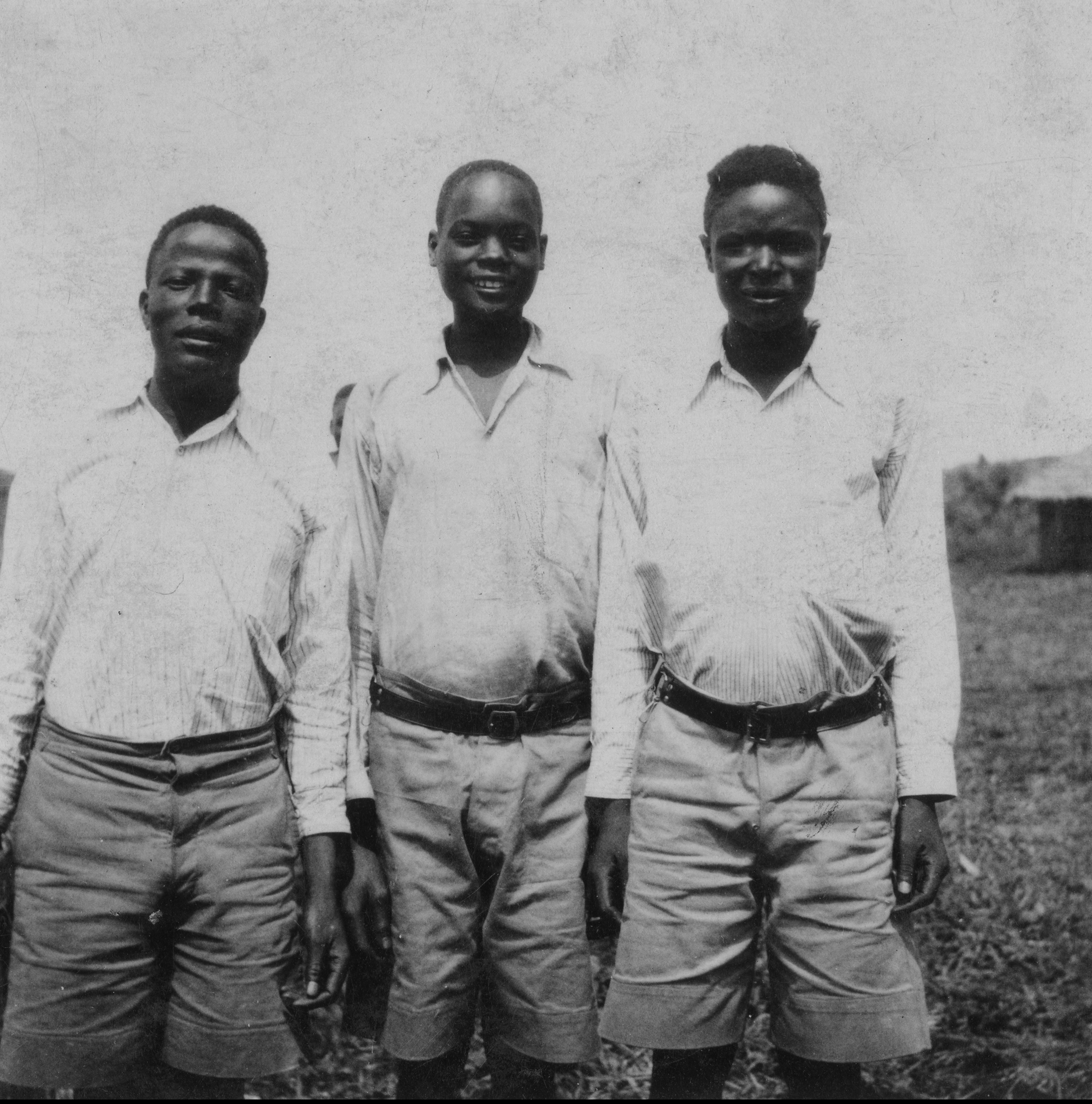
Gusii native students at the Adventist school c. 1916–1938

=== Marriage ===
Traditionally, marriage was arranged by the parents, who used intermediaries called "chisigani"; these intermediaries acted as referees for the future bride and groom. After the parents negotiated the dowry, the wedding would be organised. The wedding ceremony involved a mentor, called an "omoimari", who could provide continuing support to the newly married couple. Marriage between members of the same clan was traditionally forbidden. Marriage was officially established through the payment of dowry in the form of cattle to the wife's family. Afterwards, the man and woman are officially considered husband and wife. Divorce is customarily not allowed among Abagusii, as marriage is considered a permanent union that is only disrupted by death. Currently, civil and Christian marriages are recognised among the Abagusii.

=== Household ===
The typical Gusii family unit is composed of a man, his wives, and their children, living on the same land. This was divided into two components: the homestead ("Omochie") and the cattle camps ("Ebisarate"). The married man, his wives, and their unmarried daughters and uncircumcised boys lived in the omochie. The ebisarate, situated in the grazing fields, was protected by the male warriors to defend against theft by cattle rustlers and raiders.

=== Architecture ===
A typical Gusii house has conical grass thatched roofs, and is typically round, though sometimes rectangular, in shape. Today, Gusii houses are still similar, though corrugated iron sheets and stone is sometimes used for the roofs and walls.

The traditional Gusii compound had elevated granaries for storing crops, such as millet and other crops. The Abagusii customarily built fortified walls and dug trenches around their homesteads and villages to protect against cattle rustling and raids by neighbouring communities. However, in 1913, the cattle camps were abolished by the British, forcing Abagusii to live in dispersed homesteads.

=== Cuisine ===
The original diet of the Gusii people prior to colonisation consisted of meat, milk, and blood from livestock, cereals from millet and sorghum, as well as fruits, vegetables, birds, edible insects ("chintuga"), and wild meat obtained through hunting and gathering. The post-colonial diet of Abagusii and other African tribes has been transformed and influenced by interactions with the European colonist that introduced new crops and farming methods to Gusiiland and Africa.

The staple meal is obokima, which is a dish of millet flour or sorghum flour cooked with water to a hardened dough-like consistency. It is often served with rinagu, chinsaga, rikuneni, enderema, emboga, omotere, risosa, egesare, among other local green leaves consumed as vegetables. It's served with milk, particularly sour milk from livestock; it can also be served with any other stew. The Ekegusii word for "having a meal" ('ragera') usually connotes a meal involving obokima at the centre. By the 1920s, maize was introduced to Gusiiland and had overtaken finger millet and sorghum as staple crops and cash crops. As a result, maize is now largely used to prepare obokima. Ritoke (plural: "amatoke"), a dish of cooked and flavoured bananas, is a popular snack, but is considered a supplemental food, and not a proper meal.

=== Social organisation ===
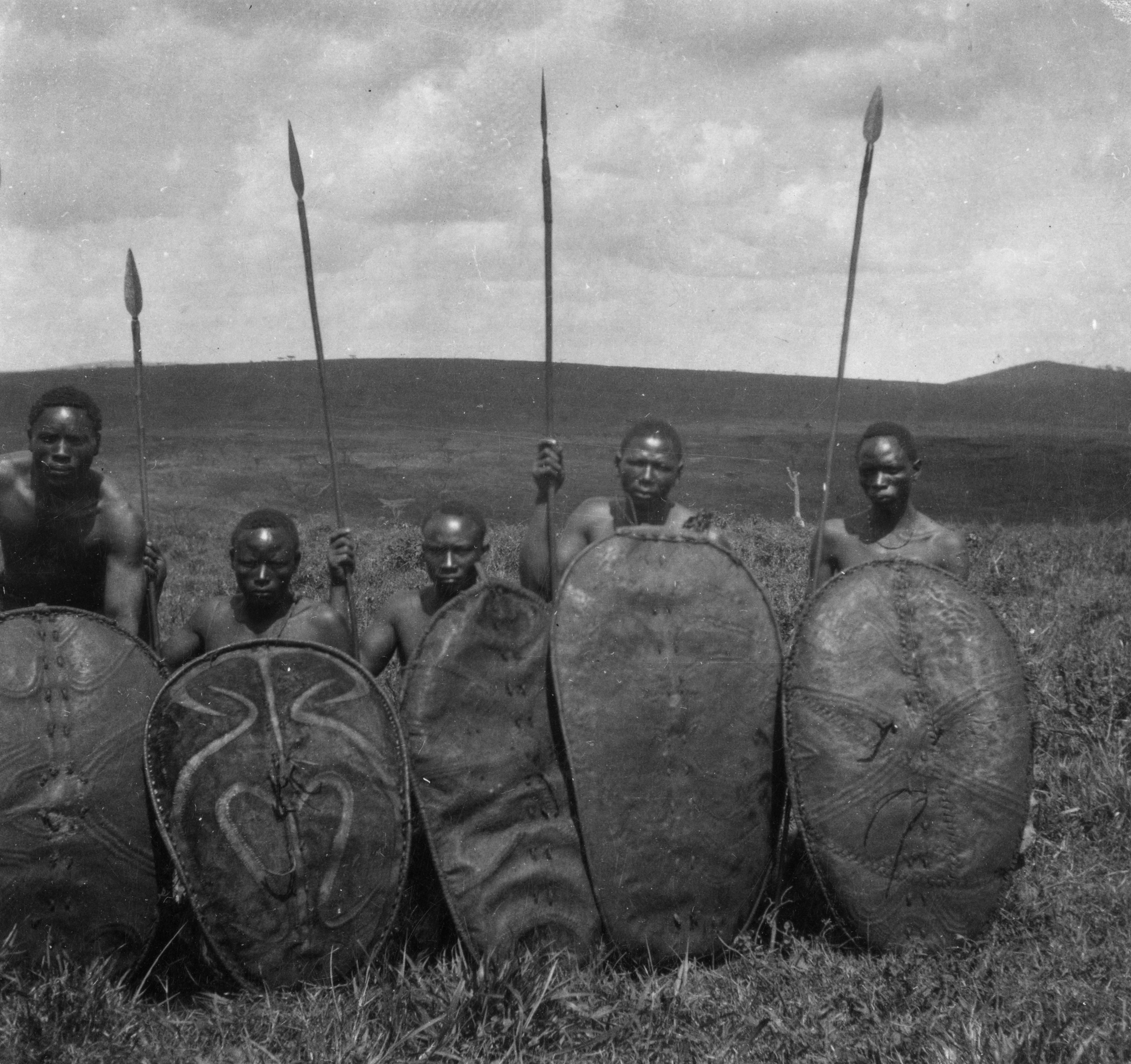
Gusii spearmen with shields and spears, c. 1916–1938

The social organisation of Abagusii is clan-based and decentralised in nature. The Abagusii society is less based on social/caste stratifications than other societies, and there was little hierarchical strata based on caste or social status. For instance, certain professions like iron smiths ("oboturi") and warriors ("oborwani"/"chinkororo") were generally respected, but did not form a distinct caste.

== Political organisation ==
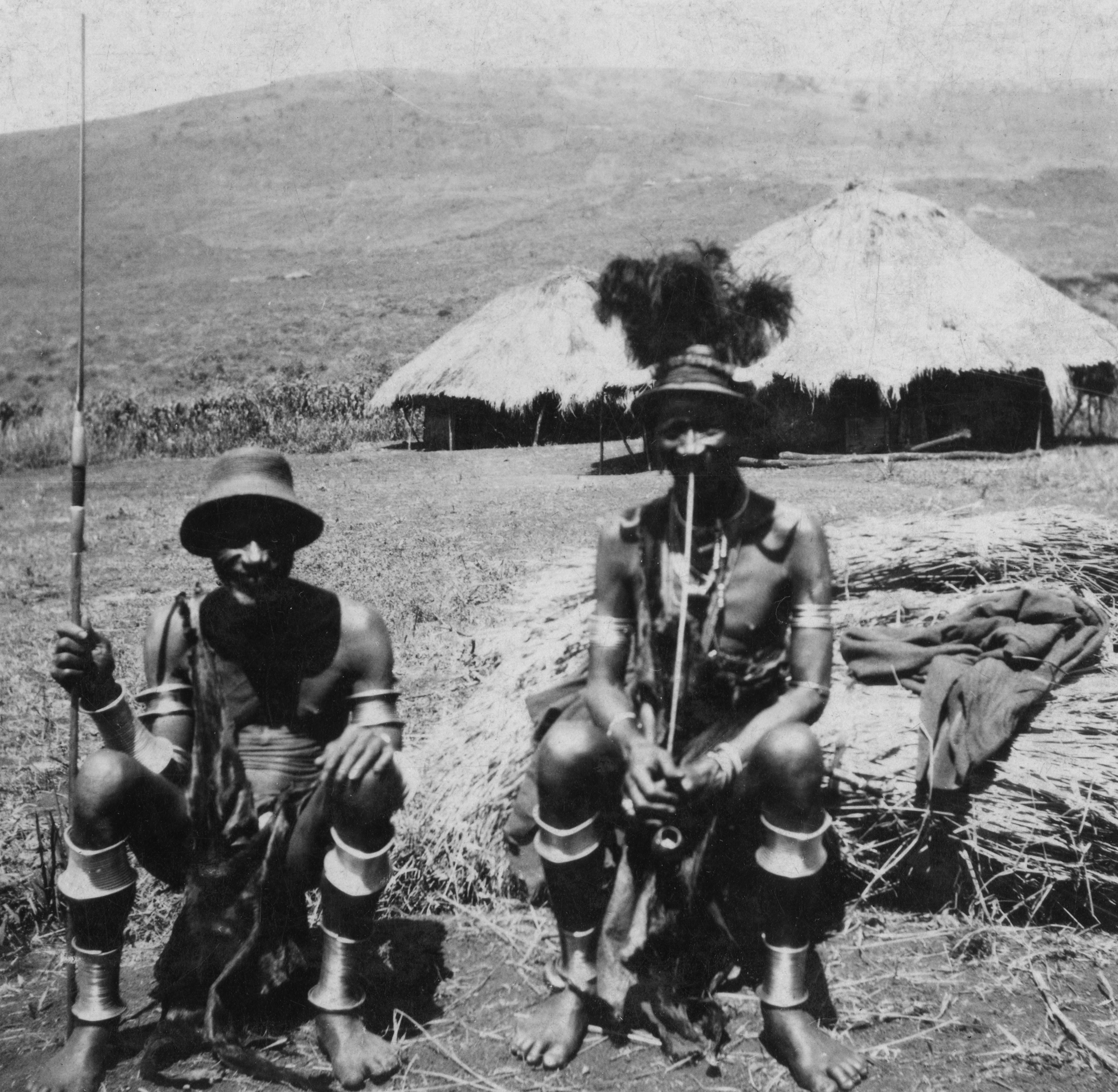
Traditional Gusii leaders c. 1916–1938.

The Abagusii had a decentralised and clan-based form of government. Each clan had their own independent government and leader; the clan leader ("omorwoti/omogambi") was the highest leadership rank for all clans and was equivalent to a king/chief role. It is common for Gusii men to refer to their peers within the community as "erwoti" or "omogambi" when talking. There were also lower leadership ranks unique to individual clans. Warriors held an important role as the defenders of the community and their shared wealth in the form of cows.

== Bibliography ==
- Akama, John S (17 February 2017). The Gusii of Kenya: Social, Economic, Cultural, Political & Judicial Perspectives (Kindle ed. (2020 ed.) ed.). Nsemia Inc. pp. 294–370. ISBN 978-1926906553.
- Akama, John S (6 August 2019). The Untold Story of the Gusii of Kenya: Survival Techniques and Resistance to the Establishment of British Colonial Rule. Nsemia Inc. ISBN 978-9966109576.
- Akama, John S.; Araka, Joshua N.; Kiriama, Herman O. (24 September 2024). The Vanishing Indigenous Heritage of the Abagusii of Kenya. Nsemia Incorporated. ISBN 978-9914-760-13-2.
- Ambrose, S.H (1982). "Archaeological and linguistic reconstructions of history in East Africa". In Ehert, C.; Posnansky, M. (eds.). The archaeological and linguistic reconstruction of African history. University of California Press. ISBN 9780520045934.
- Ambrose, S.H. (1986). Sprache und Geschichte in Afrika. Vol. 7. H. Buske. ISBN 9783871187605.
- Babaev, Kirill (2013). "Joseph Greenberg and the Current State of Niger-Congo". Journal of the Association for the Study of Language in Prehistory (18): 19.
- Bleek, Wilhelm (1855). "On the Languages of Western and Southern Africa". Transactions of the Philological Society. 2 (4): 40–50. doi:10.1111/j.1467-968X.1855.tb00791.x.
- Bosire, Kennedy (2013). Authoritative Ekegusii-English Dictionary. Nairobi: Ekegusii Encyclopedia Project.
- Coutros, Peter R.; Doman, Jessamy H.; Sakala, Igor Matonda; Bostoen, Koen (22 July 2025). An Archaeology of the Bantu Expansion: Early Settlers South of the Congo Rainforest. Taylor & Francis. ISBN 978-1-040-36922-7.
- "How the Baganda came to Kisiiland". The East African. 6 July 2020.
- Ehret, C. (1980). The historical reconstruction of Southern Cushitic phonology and vocabulary. Kölner Beiträge zur Afrikanistik. Vol. 5. Berlin: Reimer. ISBN 9783496001041.
- Ehret, C. (1983). Mack, J.; Robertshaw, P. (eds.). Culture History in the Southern Sudan. Nairobi: British Institute in Eastern Africa. pp. 19–48. ISBN 1-872566-04-9.
- Ehret, C. (1998). An African Classical Age : Eastern and Southern Africa in World History, 1000 B.C. to A.D. 400. Charlottesville: University Press of Virginia. pp. xvii, 354. ISBN 0-8139-2057-4.
- Ehret, C. (2002). The Civilisations of Africa: a History to 1800. University Press of Virginia. ISBN 0-8139-2085-X.
- Eliot, Charles (1966). The East Africa Protectorate. Psychology Press. ISBN 978-0-7146-1661-2.
- Greenberg, J. (October 1963). "[Review] Contributions to the History of Bantu Linguistics: Papers Contributed 1935–1960". C. M. Doke, D. T. Cole. American Anthropologist (New Series), 65(5):1193–1194. JSTOR 668635.
- Gibson, Hannah (2019). "The grammaticalisation of verb-auxiliary order in East African Bantu From information structure to tense-aspect" (PDF). Studies in Language. 43 (4): 757–799. doi:10.1075/sl.17033.gib. S2CID 204479937.
- Greenberg, Joseph (1949). "Studies in African Linguistic Classification: I. The Niger-Congo Family". Southwestern Journal of Anthropology. 5 (2): 79–100. doi:10.1086/soutjanth.5.2.3628626. S2CID 149333938.
- Hakansson, N. Thomas (1998). "Gusii". The Encyclopedia of World Cultures CD-ROM. Archived from the original on 19 October 2002 – via sscnet.ucla.edu.
- Hakansson, Thomas (1988). Bridewealth, women, and land: social change among the Gusii of Kenya. Stockholm: Uppsala University. ISBN 978-91-554-2190-8.
- Hakansson, Thomas (1994). "Detachable Women: Gender and Kinship in Process of Socioeconomic Change among the Gusii of Kenya". American Ethnologist (21): 516–538. doi:10.1525/ae.1994.21.3.02a00040.
- Hakansson, N. Thomas (1994). "Grain, Cattle, and Power: Social Processes of Intensive Cultivation and Exchange in Precolonial Western Kenya". Journal of Anthropological Research. 50 (3): 249–276. ISSN 0091-7710.
- Hakansson, N. Thomas (1994). "the detachability of women: gender and kinship in processes of socioeconomic change among the Gusii of Kenya". American Ethnologist. 21 (3): 516–538. doi:10.1525/AE.1994.21.3.02A00040.
- Hakansson, N. Thomas; LeVine, Robert (1995). "Contradiction and Change: Gender and Divergent Life-Course Strategies among the Gusii". In Weisner, Thomas; Bradley, Candice; Kilbride, Philip (eds.). In African Families and the Crisis of Social Change. New York: Greenwood Press.
- Håkansson, Thomas; LeVine, Robert Alan (1997). "Gender and life-course strategies among the Gusii". In Weisner, Thomas; Bradley, Candice; Kilbride., Philip (eds.). African Families and the Crisis of Social Change. Bergin & Garvey. ISBN 978-0-89789-473-9.
- "2019 Kenya Population and Housing Census Volume IV: Distribution of Population by Socio-Economic Characteristics". Kenya National Bureau of Statistics.
- LeVine, Robert A. (1982). "Gusii Funerals: Meanings of Life and Death in an African Community". Ethos. 10 (10): 26–65. doi:10.1525/eth.1982.10.1.02a00030.
- Levine, Robert A.; Levine, Sarah; Dixon, Suzanne; Richman, Amy; Leiderman, P. Herbert; Keefer, Constance H.; Brazelton, T. Berry (13 September 1996). Child Care and Culture: Lessons from Africa. Cambridge University Press. ISBN 978-0-521-57546-1.
- LeVine, Robert A. (December 1959). "Gusii Sex Offenses: A Study in Social Control". American Anthropologist 61(6):965–990. JSTOR 666776.
- LeVine, Robert A., and Barbara B. LeVine (1966). Nyansongo: A Gusii Community in Kenya. Six Cultures Series vol. 2. New York: John Wiley & Sons. OCLC 1441981865.
- LeVine, Sarah (1979). Mothers and Wives: Gusii Women of East Africa. Chicago: University of Chicago Press.
- LeVine, Sarah, and Robert A. LeVine (forthcoming). Stability and Stress: The Psychosocial History of an African Community.
- Lieber, Rochelle; Štekauer, Pavol (2014). The Oxford Handbook of Derivational Morphology. Oxford University Press. ISBN 978-0-19-964164-2.
- Mayer, Philip (1950). "Gusii Bridewealth Law and Custom". The Rhodes-Livingstone Papers, no. 18. London: Oxford University Press.
- Mayer, Philip (1949). "The Lineage Principle in Gusii Society". International African Institute Memorandum no. 24. London: Oxford University Press.
- Maxon, Robert M. (1989). Conflict and Accommodation in Western Kenya: The Gusii and the British, 1907–63. Rutherford, NJ; London: Fairleigh Dickinson University Press; Associated University Presses. p. 7.
- "The Kenyan Diaspora in the United States" (PDF). June 2015.
- Mitchell, Peter; Lane, Paul (4 July 2013). The Oxford Handbook of African Archaeology. OUP Oxford. ISBN 978-0-19-162615-9.
- Mose, Peter N. (2018). "Multilingualism and First Language Maintenance: Nubian Language Speakers in Western Kenya". Journal of Pan African Studies. 12 (4): 248+.
- Niane, Djibril Tamsir; Joseph, Ki-Zerbo (1998). Africa from the Twelfth to the Sixteenth Century. UNESCO General History of Africa. Vol. IV. Berkeley, United States: University of California Press. p. 193. ISBN 9780520066991.
- Nyamwaka, Evans Omosa (March 2011). Creative arts and cultural dynamism: a study of music and dance among the Abagusii of Kenya, 1904-2002 (Thesis). Nairobi: Kenyatta University.
- Nyarigoti, Naom; Ntabo, Victor Ondara (2020). Introduction to the grammar of Ekegusii. Eldoret, Kenya: Utafiti Foundation. ISBN 9789966262295.
- Ochieng, W.R. (1972). "'Misri' Legends in East and Central Africa". East Africa Journal. 1 (4): 10–16.
- Ochieng, William Robert (1974). A Pre-colonial History of the Gusii of Western Kenya from C. A.D. 1500 to 1914. East African Literature Bureau.
- Ochieng, William Robert (1986). People of the South-western Highlands: Gusii. Evans Bros. (Kenya). ISBN 978-0-237-49898-6.
- Omwoyo, Samson Moenga (2000). The Agricultural Changes in the Kipsigis Land, c. 1894–1963: An Historical Inquiry (Thesis).
- Varnum, John P. (1971). "The Obokano of the Gusii: A Bowl Lyre of East Africa". Ethnomusicology. 15 (2): 242–248. doi:10.2307/850469. ISSN 0014-1836.
- Wanyonyi, Pius Kakai (2023). "The Bantu Origins, Migration, and Settlement in Kenya". The Palgrave Handbook of Kenyan History. Springer International Publishing. pp. 13–21. ISBN 978-3-031-09487-3.
