= James Beauttah =

Kenyan leader

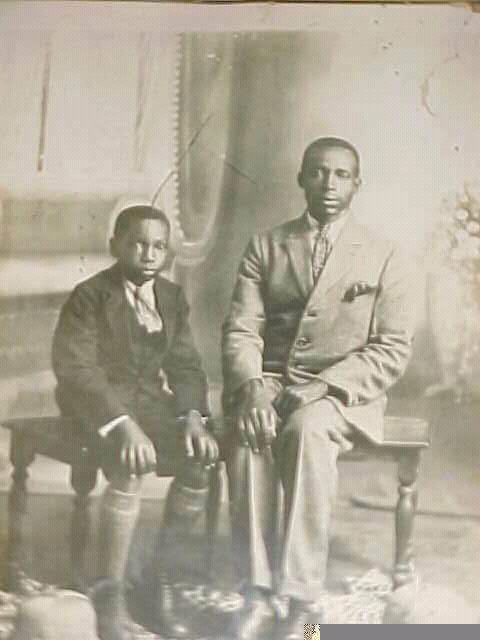
James Beauttah (right) with son Henry Rohara Beauttah in the early 1920s

James Beauttah (1889–1985) was a Kenyan anti-colonial activist and political leader.

== Early life ==
James Beauttah was born Mbutu wa Ruhara at Lower Muhito in Mukurwe-ini in present day Nyeri county. Orphaned at an early age, he fled Nyeri for Maragua in Fort Hall, present day Murang'a county, when he was 12 years old to engage in some form of labour. It is here that he would get to move with his then employer to Nairobi (in 1903). Later on (in 1904), he would move to Mombasa and, from there, he attended the CMS school at Freretown and then undertook a telegraphist course at the CMS school in Rabai.

At baptism in Freretown by the Reverend Canon Harry Kerr Binns, he was christened James Mbuto. He, later on in 1918, while working in Mombasa, anglicized his name Mbutu to Beauttah, allegedly so as to be able to circumvent then racist colonial restrictions that would've prevented him from buying shares of Brooke Bond, a white tea company operating in Kenya at the time.

Whilst training as a telegraphist at Rabai, he lived in nearby Mazeras. It is at Mazeras that he would later raise his young family comprising his wife who came from the local Mijikenda community and his children including Henry Rohara. After the training he was posted to the post office in Mombasa and then to Buganda, in 1911. His tour of duty would also take him to Kikuyu, Nairobi, Naivasha, Eldoret, Kisumu, Maseno, among other Kenyan towns as he was being transferred at least once every 2 years. He served in Mombasa, Nairobi and Uganda again severally.

His tours of duty across Kenya (meeting the leaders and founder members of the East African Association while working in Nairobi, those of the Young Nyika Association while posted in Mombasa and those from the Young Kavirondo Association while working in Kisumu and Maseno) and Uganda exposed him to the ongoing political mobilization and inspired his next moves. He would eventually retire from the postal service in 1932.

== Political life ==
In one of his postings to Nairobi, in 1924, Beauttah, alongside other men from Murang'a (Joseph Kang'ethe, George Kirongozi Ndegwa, James Njoroge, Jesse Kariuki, Kumo Kahacho), formed the Kikuyu Central Association (KCA), to fill the void left by the East African Association (previously the Young Kikuyu Association) which had been banned by the colonial government in 1922 after the deadly riots by members led by Muthoni Nyanjiru demanding the release of their leader, Harry Thuku, who had been arrested and detained by the colonial government.

In 1926, when the KCA wrote to Beauttah (who had been posted to Uganda by the colonial government at that time) and asked him to travel to London as their representative to present their grievances directly to the British government, he declined as his children were still young. He recommended that Kenyatta go in his place. Kenyatta would, on Beauttah's recommendation, subsequently become the Association's Secretary General.

In 1929, the Kikuyu Central Association decided to send Jomo Kenyatta to Britain to present African grievances before the colonial office. Indian leader and Legco member, Isher Dass, collected the funds for his trip.

When, on 24 September 1930, Kenyatta returned to Kenya, Beauttah welcomed him and his wife, Grace Wahu, who had travelled to Mombasa to receive her husband, to his Mombasa home. Beauttah would be the leader of a big delegation from Central Kenya assembled by the Association to welcome Kenya back home once again in 1946 when he returned from a subsequent visit to Britain.

Beauttah was a founder member of the Kenya African Study Union and its successor, the Kenya African Union serving as an Executive Committee member of the former and a Vice Chairman (representing Central Kenya) of the latter.

James Beauttah was sentenced to prison for 2 years in February 1952 after being arrested with regards to his political activities in Murang'a where he had settled in 1936, a few years after leaving colonial service. While still serving this sentence, he was sentenced to serve another 6-year sentence for his alleged links to the Mau Mau movement and its operations in Central Kenya.

In the 1963 General Elections, he vied against Kariuki Njiiri, whom the KANU party headquarters favoured (he had, in 1962, stepped down in favour of Kenyatta taking over his LegCo seat so that he could lead the Lancaster House talks) for the Kigumo parliamentary seat and lost. Njiiri was the son of Senior Chief Njiiri wa Karanja, a known collaborator of the colonial government. Beauttah's loss in the elections would create a permanent barrier between him and Kenyatta that would never be reconciled.

== Later life and descendants ==
After his loss in the 1963 elections, Beauttah retired to his Maragua home and would spend the rest of his life there until he died in 1985. His burial was attended by then Vice-President Mwai Kibaki, John Michuki, Kenneth Matiba.

Beauttah's descendants are spread across Kenya. One of his descendants, Henry Beauttah, is the chairman of the Maragua Residents and Business Community Association, addressing the Maragua area resident's concerns and keeping the Beauttah legacy alive. His grandson, Oscar Kiragu Beauttah, had, until his death chaired the Board of Management at Lang'ata High School and led the school's efforts to thwart grabbers of its land in Nairobi's upmarket Lang'ata neighbourhood where some members of the family, including his son Henry Rohara, have resided for decades.
