= Zanaki =

Zanaki may refer to:

- Zanaki people of Tanzania
- Zanaki language
- Bruno César Zanaki, a Brazilian footballer
