= Kikuyu Central Association =

Political organisation in Kenya

KCA
- Predecessor: East African Association
- Successor: Kenya African Union
- Formation: 1924
- Dissolved: Proscribed in 1940
- Type: Political association
- Location: Central Kenya
- Key people: James Beauttah, Joseph Kang'ethe, Jomo Kenyatta, Henry Muoria
- Publication: Muigwithania

The Kikuyu Central Association (KCA) was a political organisation in colonial Kenya, formed in 1924 to act on behalf of the Kikuyu community by presenting their concerns to the British government. The KCA was led by James Beauttah and Joseph Kang'ethe. One of its greatest grievances was the expropriation of the most productive land by British settlers from African farmers. Most of the members of the organisation were from the Kikuyu tribe.

The KCA was formed after the colonial government had banned the Young Kikuyu Association founded by Harry Thuku and the East African Association. In either 1925 or early 1926, Beauttah moved to Uganda but remained in contact with Jomo Kenyatta (who much later, upon Kenya's independence, became the country's first president). When the KCA wrote to Beauttah and asked him to travel to London as its representative, he declined but recommended that Kenyatta, who had a good command of the English language, go in his place. Kenyatta accepted, probably on condition that the KCA match his existing wage. He thus became the group's General Secretary in 1927.

The KCA was banned in 1940, when the Second World War reached East Africa. Some fighters of the later Mau-Mau still understood their struggle as a continuation of the KCA and even called themselves KCA.

The end of the war, however, saw a new type of African organisation that went beyond tribal boundaries with the rise of the Kenya African Union, which later became the Kenya African National Union.

The KCA wanted the return of African land, the abolition of the kipande system, the release of Harry Thuku, the provision of quality education and the end of forced labour.

The KCA published the Muiguithania ("the reconciler"), a Kikuyu-language newspaper that likewise was banned in 1940.

== See also ==
- Campaign against female genital mutilation in Kenya, 1929-32
- Taita Hills Association
