= Too Early for Birds =

Storytelling series based on Kenyan history

Too Early for Birds (TEFB) is a series of Kenyan theatre shows that stages diverse stories from Kenyan history. Founded in early 2017 by Kenyan performers Abu Sense and Ngartia, the show and its title were inspired by the work of historian and blogger Owaahh.

The production is experimental, mainly employing theatrical storytelling and borrowing from other elements like reenactments and music. Too Early for Birds is directed by Wanjiku Mwawuganga and features a number of upcoming and established Kenyan actors in the cast. The series has received wide acclaim among critics and audiences.

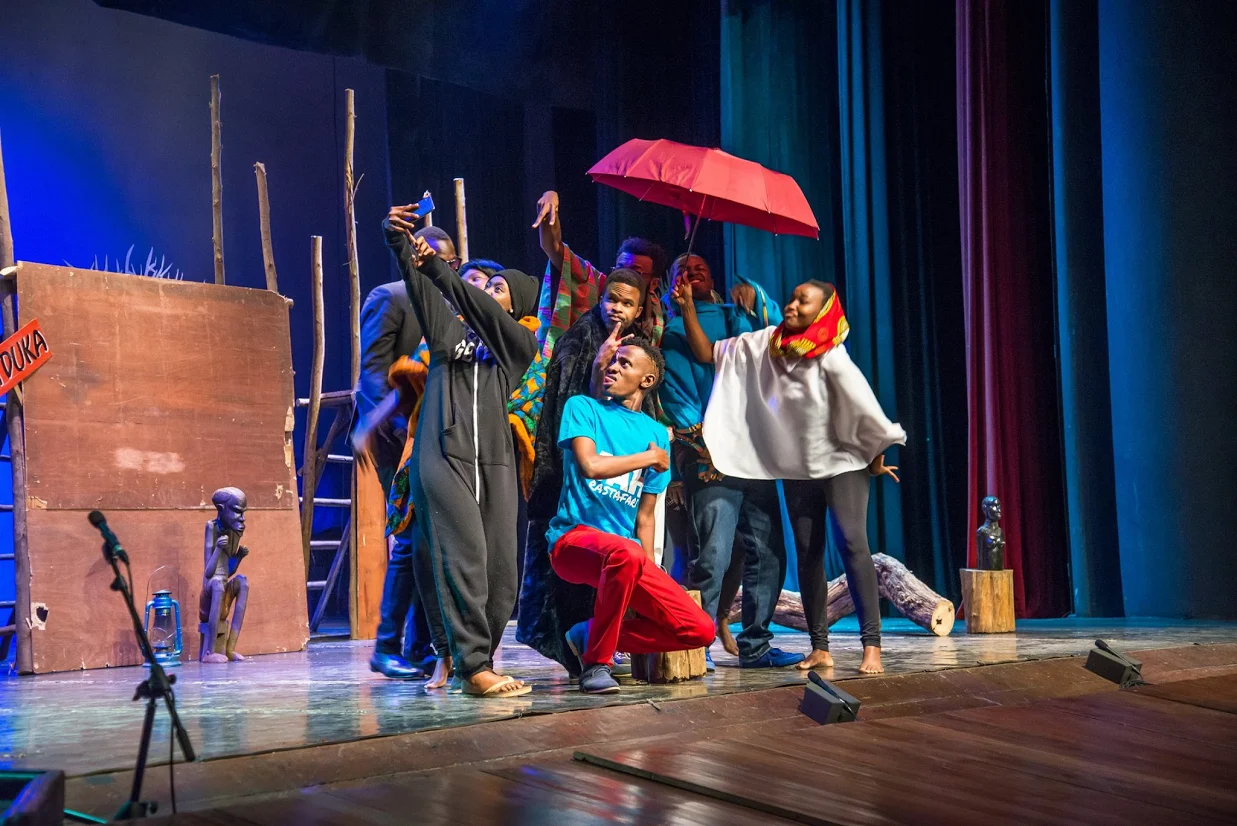
Too Early for Birds cast take a selfie on the Kenya National Theatre stage

== Series and structure ==
A typical Too Early for Birds show includes an average of three to five main stories under a single theme. The ensemble involves one main story into which the others are weaved, providing a golden thread. Each story has one main narrator, with the rest of the cast fitting into different supporting roles. In the premiere show, the stories of were stitched together by a run through the tumultuous life of Paul Ngei. The premier show was staged on May 17, 2017, at the Kenya National Theatre. It featured stories of heroes and heroines from Kenyan history, such as Muthoni Nyanjiru and Otenyo Nyamaterere. Mũthoni was a lady who led a crowd of thousands of Kenyans in an attempt to rescue a jailed leader, Harry Thuku, in 1922. Otenyo led a resistance movement in 1908 against unfair British punitive expeditions that included reckless killing and scorched earth policy.

In the next show, the stories of Wangari Maathai, Mohammed Hassan Timothy Njoya, Ewart Grogan and William Northrup McMillan were stitched together by the story of the Lumboka-Chetambe War.

== Cast ==
- Ngartia
- Abu Sense
- Laura Ekumbo
- Brian Ogola
- Sarah Masese
- Elsaphan Njora
- Miriam Kadzitu
- Brian Njagi
- Anne Moraa
- Eddie Kagure
- Tony Muchui
- Aleya Kassam
- Anne Moraa
- Sitawa Namwalie
- Akinyi Oluoch
- Suki Wanza
- GQ Dancers
- William Mwangi
- Martin Kigondu

== Production ==
Too Early for Birds is primarily written and produced by Abu Sense and Ngartia. It is directed by Wanjiku Mwawuganga. The production team also includes Zosi Kadzitu, Miriam Kadzitu, Janet Haluwa, Hellen Masido, Veon Ngugi, Gathoni Queen Gathosh Gathyonce wa Verbal Intercourse Kimuyu, and Siteiya.

Apart from stage plays, the play also produces web content based on the theatre shows on its YouTube channel.

== Editions ==
=== Edition 3: TEFBADASSERY ===
The third edition of was dubbed TEFBadassery because it covered some of the most outrageous crimes in Kenyan history. The stories included the exploits of infamous criminals such as Wacucu, Wanugu, Mary Wanjiku Karirimbi, Danson Gachui, Rasta, Matheri, among others.

=== Edition 4: The Brazen Edition ===
Dubbed TEFBrazen, the fourth edition was staged in July 2018 and featured an all female cast and crew. The Brazen Edition was scripted by Laura Ekumbo, Aleya Kassam and Anne Moraa, the three together going by the name, LAM.

At the core of it was the un-invisibling of female figures from Kenyan History. It told the stories of Zarina Patel, Chelagat Mutai, Mnyazi wa Menza (more popularly known as Mekatilili wa Menza, the infamous Wangu wa Makeri and Field Marshal Muthoni. The story of Luanda Magere was also retold, this time from the point of view of the still unnamed Nandi female hero who discovered the secret to Luanda's strength, and saved her village by bringing about his downfall.

This edition was directed by Wanjiku Mwawuganga and Produced by Gathoni Kimuyu.

== Reception ==
=== Critical response ===
Too Early for Birds has received a largely positive response among audiences and critics. One reviewer commented that the series is, "...forcing an empathy rarely extended to Kenyans past. They are asking us to see these people as just that people. With their struggles and their lives and their fears, it is almost as if they’re telling us that the greatest rebellion is to live. "

Another added "...The importance of knowing your own culture, and your own stories was brought to the fore with this amazing show – both funny and reflective, moving to the point of tears and in the next instance making you scream with laughter at the puns."

Some of the shows received mixed reviews because of the choice of cast; "...I would have especially liked to hear Muthoni Nyanjiru’s story narrated by Laura. It would have been even more powerful in a woman’s voice."

== Awards ==
- Best Production, Sanaa Theatre Awards 2018
- Best Play in English, Sanaa Theatre Awards 2018
- Maya Angelou Award (Best Production on Women's Rights and Gender Based Violence), Sanaa Theatre Awards 2018
