= Ikoma =

Ikoma may refer to:

- Mount Ikoma in Nara Prefecture, Japan
- Ikoma (ethnic group) an ethnic group of Tanzania
- Ikoma, Nara, a city in Nara Prefecture, Japan
- Ikoma Station, a station in Ikoma City, Japan
- Ikoma clan, a Japanese clan
- Japanese cruiser Ikoma, an armored cruiser of the Imperial Japanese Navy
- Japanese aircraft carrier Ikoma, an aircraft carrier of the Imperial Japanese Navy

== People with the surname ==
- Jin Ikoma (生駒 仁, born 1999), Japanese footballer
