= Taita Hills Association =

Taita Hills Association (THA) was a political organization established around the issue of land alienations in Taita Taveta District. It was established in 1939 as a branch of Kikuyu Central Association (KCA) and banned in 1940 with KCA and Ukamba Members Association. The association was linked to the land politics of colonial Kenya.

The main political goals of the association were:

- The restoration of alienated lands of Taita tribe
- Keeping check on the destocking policies of the colonial government
- To get explanation on threat of removal of Wataita to Samburu
- To gain personal rights such as removal of the Kipande system

In the time of the banning, the association had 4000 supporters. After banning, these supporters continued the work to the 1950s but in the beginning of Mau Mau uprising the activity of the association diminished.
