= Kipande House =

Historical building in Nairobi

Coordinates: 1.2850518°S 36.8186186°E

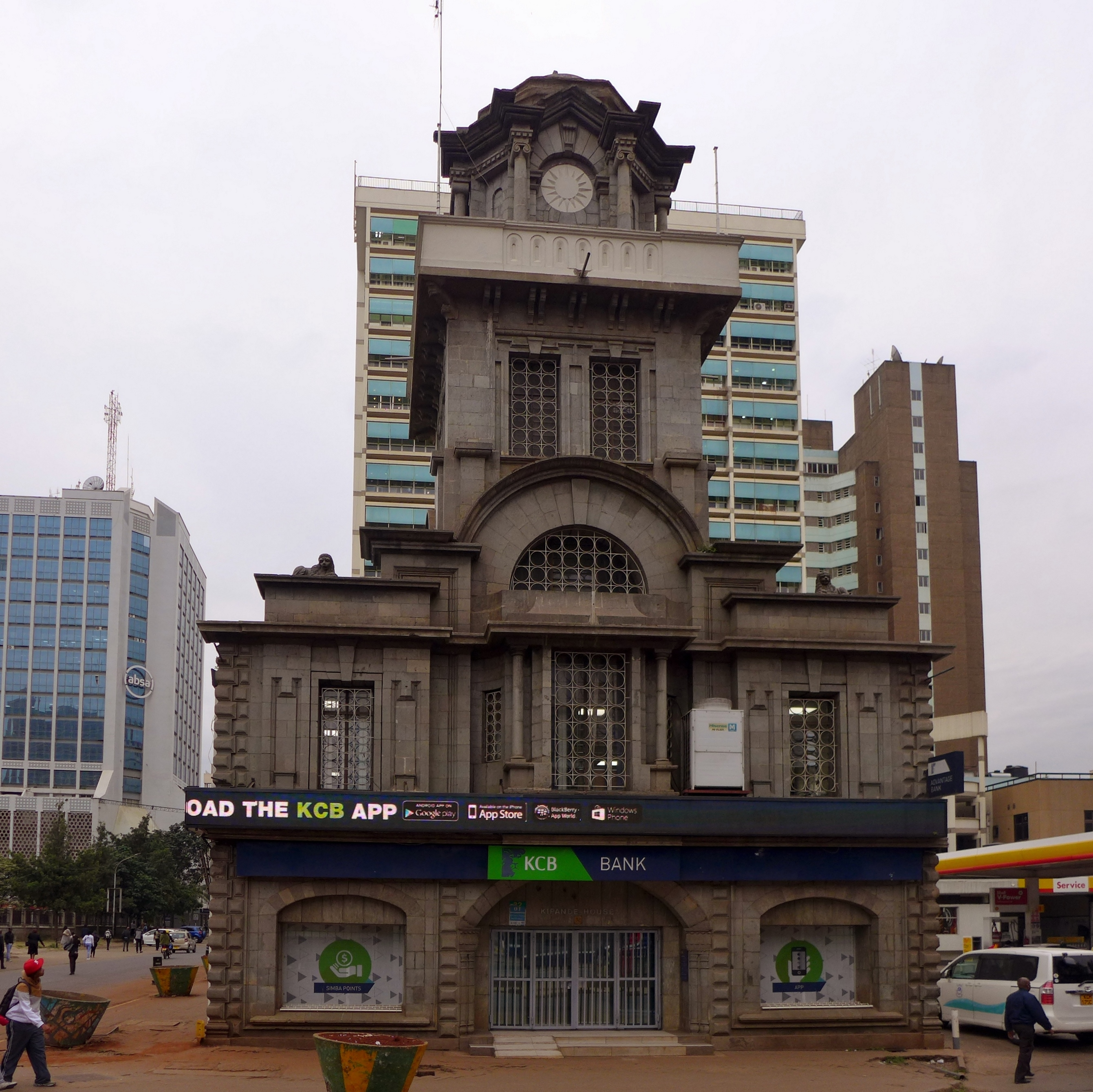
- Kipande House
- Interactive map of the Kipande House area
- Former names: Nayer building

General information
- Location: Nairobi, Kenya, Kenyatta Avenue
- Completed: 1913

Design and construction
- Architect: Gurdit Singh Naye

Kipande house is a historical building located at the central business district of Nairobi at the intersection of Kenyatta avenue and Loita street. The structure was designed in 1889 by Sardar Gurdit Singh Nayer, an Indian-born entrepreneur who later became one of the early settlers in colonial Kenya, and was completed in 1913. It was initially called the Nayer building, which later became known as Kipande house.

== History ==
During the colonial period, Kipande house was where all the Kenyans were expected to go for registration and issuance of identification card also known as Kipande in Swahili which influenced the name its known by today. It was once considered one of the tallest buildings in Nairobi.

Kipande house was leased to the British colonial government during the World War I and temporary used a warehouse due to its proximity to the Uganda Railway.

The building was acquired by Kenya Commercial Bank in 1976 and is currently a banking hall.
