= Zanaki people =

Ethnic group from Mara Region of Tanzania

Zanaki(Aba-Zanaki)
Total population
- 200,000

Regions with significant populations
- Tanzania

Languages
- IkiZanaki, Kiswahili

Religion
- African Traditional Religion, Christianity

Related ethnic groups
- Abakuria, Abagusii, Ngurimi, Ikoma

The Zanaki are a Bantu ethnolinguistic group from the heart of Mara Region, Tanzania, to the east of Lake Victoria. The group is subdivided into the Birus and the Buturis.

== Notable people ==
- Julius Nyerere (1922–1999), the founder and first president of Tanzania was a Zanaki and was the son of the King Burito Nyerere (1860–1942), who was chief of the Zanaki, and of Christina Mgaya wa Nyang'ombe (1891-1997).
- David Musuguri (1920-2024), Chief of the Tanzania People's Defence Force 1980–1988
- Joseph Sinde Warioba served as Prime Minister of Tanzania from 1985 to 1990. Furthermore, he served concurrently as the country's Vice President. He has also served as a judge on the East African Court of Justice, and as chairman of the Tanzanian Constitutional Review Commission since 2012
