= Obokano =

Kenyan bowl lyre

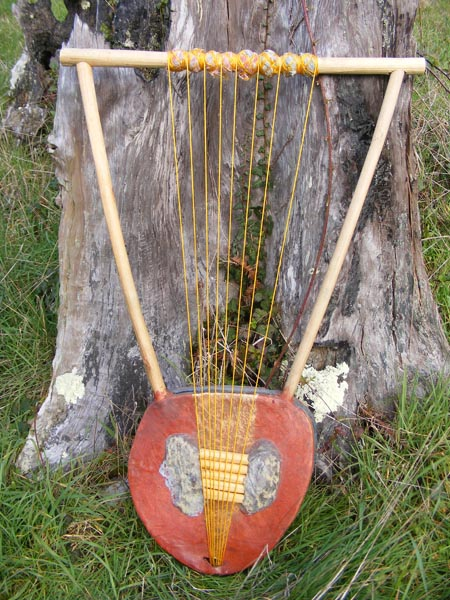
Obokano

The obokano (also spelled obukano) is a large bass bowl lyre from Kenya. It is used by the Gusii ethnic group.

The instrument is made from a skin of a cow or goat and a bowl like structure curved out of a wood stump. It consists of eight strings whose tensions on the crossbar can be adjusted to produce different tones. It has been described as "the double-bass of East Africa."

This is the largest such lyre in Kenya and instruments may be as large as six feet tall. It is used to accompany singing and dancing, Gusii music usually being vocal. When used solo, it is generally as an introduction to singing. The instrument is usually reserved for male members of the Gusii.
