= Jita people =

Ethnic group from Mara Region of Tanzania

The Jita are a Cushitic group predominantly based in the Musoma District of the Mara Region in northern Tanzania, situated along the southeastern shore of Lake Victoria. As of 2005, the population of the Jita was estimated to be over 200,000 people. The Jita people are divided into various clans, including the Rusori, Batimba, Bajandwa, and Bagamba clans.

== Etymology ==
The name "Jita" or "Wajita" is believed to have originated from a historical mispronunciation by German colonial authorities. The Jita had initially settled in an area around a prominent mountain in Musoma called Masita. When the German colonisers encountered the region, they struggled to pronounce the name "Masita" and referred to the local inhabitants as "Majita" or "Wajita."

== Clans and Cultural Identity ==
The Rusori clan is considered by some as the original Jita group, as they were reportedly the first to settle in the region. The Rusori clan is distinguished by certain physical characteristics such as being light-skinned, tall, and having long noses compared to other clans in the region. The Rusori clan maintains pastoral and fishing traditions, while other Jita clans, such as Batimba, Bajandwa and Bagamba, share common cultural practices through intermarriage.

The Rusori also trace their ancestry back to Ethiopia, Egypt, and Sudan, identifying themselves as descendants of the Nubians. In some historical accounts, they are regarded as Bachwezi in Bunyoro, Kitara, and Bahuma in Batoro, Uganda. According to oral tradition, the Bachwezi mysteriously disappeared, with some believed to have migrated to Rwanda, Karagwe in Bukoba, and Uganda where they assimilated into the Nyankole group.

== Language ==
The Jita people speak Suguti, a Bantu language. While they are not all of Bantu origin, they adopted the Bantu language when they settled in the Mara Region. Some neighbouring tribes, like the Baruuli from Uganda, as well as the Haya, Nyambo, Kerebe, Bakwaya, Zanaki and Zinza, share linguistic similarities with the Jita. The Zinza are believed to have roots in Uganda, particularly in Jinja, and are part of the Nyankole ethnic group.

== Cultural Practices ==
Historically, certain Jita clans like the Rusori did not eat fish or chicken, viewing it as an abomination. However, environmental changes and shifts in cultural norms have led to a relaxation of these taboos, and many Jita now consume fish and chicken. Similar dietary taboos and changes can be seen among the Banyoro, Batoro, and Nyambo people from Karagwe.

== Diaspora and Migration ==
The Jita can also be found in neighboring countries such as Burundi, Rwanda, and Uganda. There are villages named Buruli, Rusoro, and Bulinga, which indicate Jita settlements in these areas.

Some Jita people claim to have ancestral links to Egypt and Sudan. Additionally, certain Jita names, particularly those beginning with "Chi," have similarities to names found among the Igbo people of Nigeria, where "Chi" means "God." Examples of these names include Chikere, Chijoriga, and Chinyere. The Teso tribe in Uganda also shares linguistic connections with the Igbo, having similar names and words in their languages.
