= Warrior Otenyo =

Kenyan colonial fighter

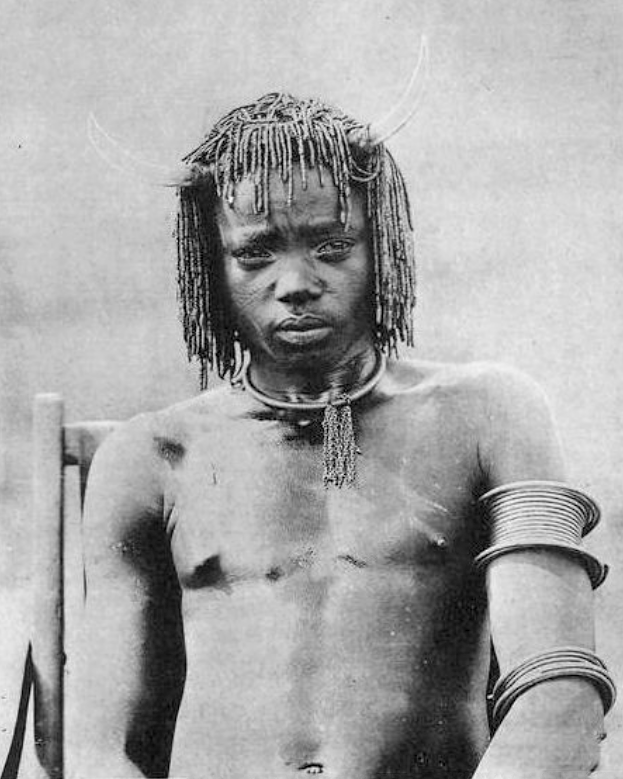
Otenyo Nyamaterere, a Gusii warrior, c. 1905–1907.

Otenyo Nyamaterere was a Kenyan warrior who led a battalion of Gusii warriors in resisting British colonialisation. He was encouraged by his aunt (by some accounts adopted mother), Moraa Ng'iti, to launch an attack against British forces. He is famously remembered for injuring GAS Northcote, a British colonial administrator, triggering a widespread rebellion. Northcote had first gone to Kisii as part of a military force in 1904 which massacred people and raised the Union Jack. He returned in 1907 as the areas first administrator, and was on his way back from a punitive expedition when he was attacked by Otenyo with a spear after shooting dead Okwengu K'Akala at Got Ong'ong'o presently Got Ka'Nyakworo around Ruga Market Centre. Although Northcote survived the attack, Otenyo's ambush inspired widespread resistance which took a month to quell. The warrior was arrested, tried in public, and then killed by a firing squad at Kisii Stadium. His body was then beheaded and transported to London as proof of his death. What remained of him was left on a public bridge as a warning to others.

== Background ==
In 1905, British officers from the King's African Rifles (K.A.R) arrived in Gusiiland where they met resistance from the Gusii warriors whom they attacked with machine guns and killed quite a number. They burned homesteads, seized livestock and destroyed crops already on the farms in what came to be known as the "massacre". Families including women and children who showed resistance of moving from their homes were mercilessly shot dead and their huts torched during this expedition.

The British and their Nubian porters forcefully settled in the present day Kisii town which was known as Getare at the time, but not without tensions from the Kitutu region which was known to be the militaristic centre of the whole Gusiiland. This constant fighting made it hard for the British to realise their expansionism dreams of occupying more land. The Gusii elders encouraged young men who had gone through the initiation ceremony to marry fearing a whole generation would be wiped out, citing prophet Sakawa's foresights of the coming of the white man before his death in 1902.

On numerous occasions the British made sudden predatory invasions on cattle camps known as ebisarate and seized livestock. One well-known British hostile attack on Omogusii was in 1908 when they raided ebisarate in the Kitutu region and confiscated over 8,000 livestock. The British with the aid of their Nubian troops used guns and overpowered the young warriors hence killing them and getting away with the livestock. One warrior who survived these initial 1908 attacks was named Otenyo. He had a young daughter named Bosibori and lived in the same homestead with his aunt Moraa, a medicine woman-cum-prophetess who was vocally rebellious to the alien authority.

Otenyo was infuriated with the serious losses of livestock and conceived a counterattack plan on the British officers who were by then marching the livestock out of Kitutu. With his aunt encouraging him, Otenyo assembled seasoned warriors with whom together they received blessings from Moraa before leaving to confront the British officers. Armed with poisonous arrows and spears, their plan was to use a different route and get ahead of the British officers who were moving slowly with the livestock. Once they would be in front of them, the warriors were to waylay the British officers by spreading themselves out and hiding inside a thicket of bushes known as ebitutu.

This attack took place in the present day Manga in Kitutu region. Though armed with inferior weapons, the Gusii warriors managed to lay an ambush on the British and recovered many livestock which they led towards the Manga escarpment. Some brave warriors sacrificed their lives and many more were wounded. One British officer was speared dead by warrior Otenyo. The British officers shot and wounded Otenyo whom they captured. His bloodied headless body was later found dumped beside a bridge with multiple gunshot wounds.

The name of the British colonial officer who beheaded warrior Otenyo was Geoffrey Alexander Northcote who was 27 years old at the time and was better known to the locals as "Mr. Nyarigoti". He was leading the British invasion at the time and there was corroborating evidence from the Nubian soldiers in Bosongo where he was stationed, of his unbounded pride in having beheaded a Gusii warrior. He stayed in Kenya until 1927 before he left for Gold Coast (Ghana).

== Death and legacy ==
During the counter-attack by British forces after Otenyo's attack on Northcote, over 160 people were killed. Otenyo was captured and tried in public. He was then executed by a firing squad, then beheaded and the rest of him left on a bridge. Under the guidance of the Gusii elders, Otenyo's headless body was buried at the top of Manga escarpment (present day Kitutu).

Moraa continued administering to the wounded Gusii warriors until she died in 1929 due to old age. Moraa is regarded a Gusii heroine for her courage and many songs have been composed in her tribute. Gusii warriors from Kitutu who died protecting Gusiiland and their livestock are remembered through songs and stories depicting their bravery in the different wars they fought.

Otenyo's family was taken care of by Moraa after his death. Through his only daughter Bosibori, his family is now widespread in the Manga and Matutu area of Kitutu region. In 2015, Gusii elders demanded the repatriation of his skull, said to still be held by a British museum.

The story of Otenyo has resurfaced in multiple pop culture and social activism efforts, such as Too Early for Birds and Project Courage.
