= Mary Muthoni Nyanjiru =

Kenyan political activist (died 1922)

Mary Mūthoni Nyanjirū
- Born: Unknown; Weithaga, Murang'a, Kenya
- Died: 16 March 1922; Nairobi, Kenya
- Citizenship: Kenyan
- Occupation: Political activist
- Known for: Leading protest following the arrest of Harry Thuku
- Notable work: Protest leadership during the 1922 Harry Thuku protests
- Movement: East African Association
- Relatives: Elizabeth Waruiru (stepdaughter)

Mary Mūthoni Nyanjirū (? – 16 March 1922) was a Kikuyu woman and a Kenyan political activist remembered for leading the protest after the arrest of Harry Thuku, that resulted in her death. Mūthoni Nyanjirū was born in Weithaga, Murang'a, Kenya, although her date or year of birth are not recorded. At the time she was shot and killed in 1922, she had been living in Nairobi with her stepdaughter, Elizabeth Waruiru.

== Background ==
Nyanjirū was an associate and supporter of Harry Thuku. Thuku, secretary and Young Kikuyu Association (later known as the East African Association) was known throughout Kikuyuland as "chief of women" mainly for his vocal support of women especially around the issues of physical and sexual abuse, as well as forced labor.

== Harry Thuku protests ==
Thuku was arrested on 14 March 1922, over concern for his increasing militancy and the growing number of his supporters. The day following Thuku's arrest a strike was called by the EAA and thousands peacefully marched to the Nairobi police station, where Thuku was being held. The strikers came to demonstrate and secure his release. After praying for Thuku's safety the crowd dispersed. That evening, women supporters engaged in a practice called oathing, a custom exclusive to men. Oath-taking by women violated Kikuyu tradition as women were considered to be mentally unfit and bodily unable to endure the ordeal of taking oath. Elizabeth Waruiru, in her account of the events on the evening of 15 March, named James Njoroge, a member of the East African Association (EAA) as the oath-giver.

Oaths were administered to over 200 women in the crowd, in essence, binding them to execute a specific plan of action. Historically, tribal oaths were not used by governmental institutions, the EAA was the first to do so. Whether oathing raised their political awareness or a sense of discipline, women acted in unity the following day when it was clear that Thuku would not be freed.

On the morning of 16 March, a delegation of six men were chosen from the crowd to meet with Sir Charles Bowring, the Colonial Secretary, who assured them that Thuku was in no danger and was only being detained while waiting for the government to grant him a full hearing. The government hearing would fairly decide Thuku's fate. The delegation was encouraged to return to the crowd to ask them to peacefully disperse. Upon their return, they announced that Thuku was to be tried instead of released, then urged the strikers to go home. As many in the crowd were incensed, this was fruitless. It was then that a large group of agitated women started pushing forcefully toward the gate, some shouting at the men that they were cowards and making accusations of bribery to the delegation. Hearing this, the men who had started to disperse changed their minds and returned.

Mary Mūthoni Nyanjirū leapt to her feet, ran to the front of the crowd, lifted her dress over her head, and cried: "You take my dress and give me your trousers. You men are cowards. What are you waiting for? Our leader is in there. Let's get him." The tactic, called guturamira ng’ania, was considered a serious insult among the Kikuyu, who view it as a curse to see a woman the age of one's mother naked; rarely used, it indicates that the authority of men is no longer recognized in the situation, and is considered a powerful symbol of women's defiance. As Nyanjirū's actions unfolded, many of the women present ululated their approval in response, and the crowd surged forward until the police or askaris opened fire. Nyanjirū was among the first people killed.

== Aftermath ==
The total number of dead is given in various sources as between twenty-eight and more than one hundred. There has been no evidence that the askaris were ordered to fire by the officers in charge, though there are accounts stating that the askaris were on duty for eighteen continuous hours in the heat while being subjected to harassment by the crowd. The official number of casualties were given as twenty-one Africans killed, four of whom were women and an additional twenty-eight injured. Thuku's own account of the day, having seen events unfold from his cell, relates that as the police fired from the front, other European settlers who had gathered at the Norfolk Hotel began shooting into the crowd from behind. Other accounts substantiated Thuku's claim; settlers were drinking on the veranda of the hotel near the scene and joined in the shooting and were responsible for many of the deaths.

Little is known about the other women that were involved, even killed, in the Harry Thuku disturbance, and Nyanjirū is the only woman for whom there is any background information. She is the sole woman named in the protest. Men connected to the protest do have their names recorded in respect to this incident, while women are largely anonymous.

== Legacy ==
Mary Mūthoni Nyanjirū's little immediate change to the colonial regime, still, she is remembered as a heroine in folklore, song and poetry. The song Kanyegenuri, memorializes the actions and bravery of Nyanjirū and was sung during the Mau Mau resistance as an anthem of opposition. This and other anthems of heroic African women were banned as they were considered to be a political threat.

Nyanjirū is memorialized again in the poem "Mother Afrika's Matriots", where the verse pertaining to Nyanjirū reads: "Mary Mūthoni Nyanjirū who reignited a retreating volcano of workers". Additionally, Nyanjirū's story was featured in an experimental theater production about Kenyan heroes and heroines titled Too Early for Birds.
