= Suba people (Tanzania) =

Ethnic group from Mara Region of Tanzania

The Suba of Tanzania are a community of people in Rorya District, Mara Region, Tanzania speaking mutually intelligible varieties of the Suba language. They are mainly located in Nyancha, Luo-Imbo and Suba Divisions of Rorya District. The groups commonly listed as being part of the Suba community are the Hacha, Kine, Rieri, Simbiti, Surwa and Sweta. There are a total of around 80,000 ethnic Suba living in Tanzania, most of whom are still speaking the Suba language although some, particularly the Rieri, have started to speak Luo .

The language spoken by the Suba of Tanzania is very close to the Kisuba language spoken by the Suna Girango(Abagirango) people of Migori County of Kenya and Kuria language spoken by the Kuria people. The language spoken by the Suba of Tanzania is distinct from the Olosuba language spoken by the Suba people of Homa Bay County of Kenya and some islands of Lake Victoria.
