= Zanaki language =

Bantu language of Tanzania

Zanaki
- Native to: Tanzania
- Region: Mara Region, Musoma Rural District, Makongoro Division
- Native speakers: 100,000 (2005)
- Language family: Niger–Congo?: Atlantic–Congo; Benue–Congo; Bantoid; Bantu; Northeast Bantu; Great Lakes Bantu; Logooli–Kuria (E.40); Zanaki

Language codes
- ISO 639-3: zak
- Glottolog: zana1238
- Guthrie code: JE.44

Zanaki (Ikizanaki) is a Bantu language of Tanzania. It is spoken by the Zanaki people of Musoma and was the first language of Tanzanian president Julius Nyerere, son of the King Burito Nyerere (1860–1942).
