= Harry Thuku =

Kenyan politician (1895–1970)

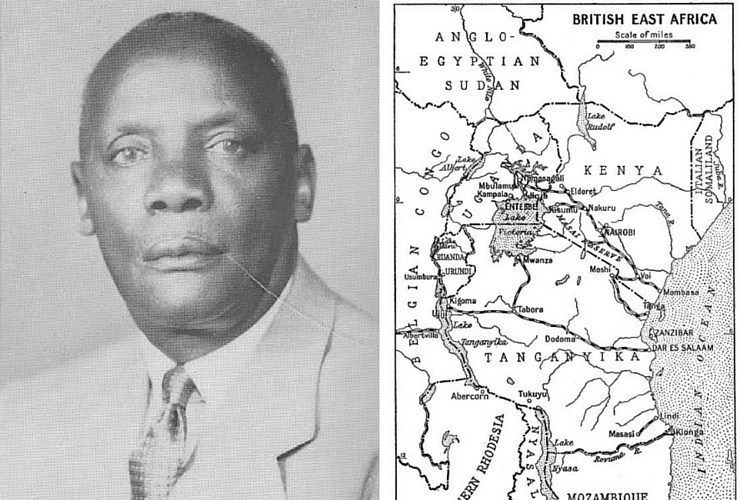
Harry Thuku

Harry Thuku (1895 – 14 June 1970) was a Kenyan born in Kiambu, Mìtahato village. As a politician, he was one of the pioneers in the development of modern African nationalism in Kenya. He helped found the Young Kikuyu Association and the East African Association before being arrested and exiled from 1922 to 1931. In 1932 he became President of the Kikuyu Central Association, in 1935 founded the Kikuyu Provincial Association, and in 1944 founded the Kenya African Study Union. Opposed to the Mau Mau movement, he later retired to coffee-farming.

== Education ==
Harry Thuku was born in Kambūi in Kiambu district of Central Kenya. His family were Kikuyu, one of the ethnic groups that lost the largest amount of land to white settlers during the British takeover of Kenya. He spent four years at the school of the KambūiGospel Mission, Harry Thuku became a typesetter for the Leader, a European settler newspaper. In 1918, he rose to the position of a clerk-telegraph operator in the government treasury office in Nairobi. He accumulated vast experience while he was working for the government. Thuku was one of the first of Kenya's Africans to be fully capable of working in the English language.

== Political activism ==
=== The Kikuyu Association ===
In association with Abdalla Tairara, Thuku helped found the Young Kikuyu Association, the first organisation to defend African interests in colonial Kenya. The Young Kikuyu Association was a non-militant group that pursued a peaceful and structured liberation struggle with the government and missions. Its main concern was for the preservation of African-owned land. Thuku argued that land was an important factor of production and that the livelihood of the Kikuyu people, who are primarily farmers, risked being lost. His message reverberated strongly not only within his immediate Kikuyu tribe but also with other farming communities in Kenya and Africa. From 1920 to 1921 Thuku served as the secretary to the Kikuyu Association. However, he was more interested in action-oriented measures to address the rising economic challenges facing Kenyan Africans, realizing that the organisation was becoming heavily political and thus ill-equipped to achieve the association's original objectives of economic emancipation. In 1921, he stepped down from his position at the Kikuyu Association. Kenyan Africans were suffering economic difficulties, and the Europeans who were now in control of vast swathes of the local economy wanted to further cut Native African wages on the pretext of reviving the colony's economic position. Thuku's political and economic vision for the native African is widely credited as an important underlying common theme that was adopted and greatly characterised the greater African struggle for economic and political independence.

Robert I. Rotberg describes Thuku as the "first Kikuyu nationalist."

=== East African Association ===
In July 1921 Thuku founded the East African Association, the first multi-ethnic political organization in East Africa. Based in Nairobi, the East African Association drew its members from many tribal groups, though most members were Kikuyu. Unusually for the time, the East African Association also involved a number of women. It campaigned against the kipande system of pass controls, and the forced labour.

==== Arrest and exile ====
The colonial Kenyan government was heavily opposed to the association's aims. The settler-dominated colony was not yet ready for any forceful representation of African economic, social and political views, and moved to ban national political movements. On 14 March 1922, Thuku was arrested in connection with his political activities. On the two following days, there were demonstrations initiated by Mary Mūthoni Nyanjiru to protest his arrest. The first demonstration, on the 15th, passed off peacefully, dispersing after a public prayer for Thuku's safety. On 16 March 1922, a crowd of 7,000 to 8,000 of his supporters gathered around the Nairobi police station to demand his release from detention. The police eventually opened fire on the demonstrators, killing at least 25 of them, and possibly as many as 56 killed according to African workers at the Nairobi mortuary. White civilians joined in the shooting, and may have shot some of the protesters in the back. Thuku was exiled, without charge or trial, to Kismayu in the Northern Frontier Province of Kenya, in present-day Somalia.

During Thuku's absence, the government of the day tried to co-opt the association leadership with monetary inducements and piece-meal reforms. Thuku remained in their thoughts as a primary leader. The East African Association declined to participate in the political process, but those co-opted individuals and a host more who were interested in classical African political rights remained actively engaged.

=== Kikuyu Central Association ===
Thuku was given permission to return to Kìambu in January 1931. By that time, the colonial government allowed formation of tribal based political parties restricted to some tribal 'homelands' only. This was done to avoid national uprising against the colonial authorities. In 1932 Thuku became president of the Kikuyu Central Association, then Kenya's foremost African political group. Although dissension arose among the loyalists and the co-opted leaders of the association, which was fomented by the colonial powers of the day. The power struggles split the organisation into factions.

=== Kikuyu Provincial Association ===
Harry Thuku went on to re-assemble the loyal remnants of the East African Association, which was renamed the Kikuyu Provincial Association in 1935, devoted to legal, non-militant protest. In 1944 he founded the Kenya African Study Union, the precursor of the Kenya African Union.

== Influence on the independence movement ==
Harry Thuku's ideals and approach were one strand in the larger African struggle for political and economic independence from the late 1940s to 1960s. However, Thuku's advocacy of moderation in political struggle caused a permanent split between Thuku and the rising generation of the future leaders of Kenya. He was strongly opposed to the Mau Mau movement. On 12 December 1952 he broadcast to the nation, saying that "To-day we, the Kikuyu, stand ashamed and looked upon as hopeless people in the eyes of other races and before the Government. Why? Because of the crimes perpetrated by Mau Mau and because the Kikuyu have made themselves Mau Mau." On 28 January 1954 he joined twenty two other Kikuyu leaders at Kabete in subscribing to an appeal to the people to renounce and denounce Mau Mau.

== Retirement from politics ==
Thuku later retired to a successful life in coffee-farming in Kabete, Central province, Kenya. One of the first Kikuyu to win a coffee licence, in 1959 he became the first African board member of the Kenya Planters Coffee Union. He died on 14 June 1970.

After independence, Harry Thuku Road in Nairobi was named after him.

== Sources ==
- David Anderson (2000), "Master and Servant in Colonial Kenya", Journal of African History, 41:459–485.
- Thuku, Harry. Harry Thuku: An Autobiography. Nairobi: Oxford University Press, 1970.
- Harry Thuku explains why he formed a political movement for all East Africans.
- John Lonsdale (2004), "Thuku, Harry", Oxford Dictionary of National Biography, Oxford University Press.
- Wunyabari Maloba (1998), Mau Mau and Kenya: An Analysis of a Peasant Revolt. Bloomington: Indiana University Press ISBN 0-253-21166-2.
- Carl Rosberg and John Nottingham (1966), The Myth of 'Mau Mau': nationalism in Kenya. New York: Praeger.
- Audrey Wipper (1989), "Kikuyu Women and the Harry Thuku Disturbances: Some Uniformities of Female Militancy", Africa: Journal of the International African Institute, 59.3: 300–337.
