= Ngurimi people =

Ethnic group from Mara Region of Tanzania

The Ngurimi are a Bantu ethnolinguistic group based in northern Tarime District and Serengeti District of Mara Region of Tanzania near the border with Kenya. In 1987 the Ngurimi population was estimated to number 32,000 .
