= Ikoma people =

Ethnic group from Mara Region of Tanzania

The Ikoma are an ethnic and linguistic group based in Mara Region in northern Tanzania.

In 1987, the Ikoma population was estimated to number 15,000. History shows that the Waikoma are closely related to the Wangoreme and Waissenye tribes with whom they are believed to have migrated to Serengeti district, leaving the Wasonjo, their other close relatives in Loliondo, Ngoronoro district of Arusha Region, behind.

The four tribes lived by hunting and gathering but later adopted agriculture, such as cultivating crops (mainly finger millet, simsim, groundnuts and sorghum) and keeping livestock (sheep, cattle and goats) for their subsistence, barter trade, and customary payments such as bride price. Even after adopting agricultural practices, the Waikoma remained dependent on wild animals for their source of protein. Meat from domestic animals was eaten only during customary ceremonies such as weddings, circumcision, or initiation into adulthood. However, with the increasing awareness on the importance of the conservation of wildlife and the government policy of sharing of the revenue from tourism with the local government and communities, hunting and depending on game meat is slowly becoming history to the Waikoma.

They speak the Ikoma language. It is a simple Bantu language, easily understood by other Bantu people living around Lake Victoria and indeed the whole of East Africa. However, intermarriages with people from other Tanzanian tribes or even non-Tanzanians is slowly but surely going to lead to the extinction of the language if deliberate efforts are not made to conserve it.

The Waikoma have strived to keep pace with the economic and technological changes in the country. Most expectant mothers attend antenatal clinics and ensure that their infants receive all the mandatory vaccinations. Most of the school-age children attend school with the majority of them continuing through secondary education in the ward or other secondary schools. There are many university graduates although most of them secure employment in major urban centres far from home. The average Mwikoma is politically active and participates in all socio-economic activities in his/her village.
