= Young Kikuyu Association =

The Young Kikuyu Association (YKA) was formed in Kenya on 10 June 1921, as a break away organisation from the Kikuyu Association (KA). In July 1921 it was renamed the East Africa Association (EAA). Harry Thuku, who had previously been secretary of the KA, felt that the KA was not demanding enough from the British Authorities in Kenya and that grievances should be sent directly to London.

Young Kikuyu Association was formed to protest against; land alienation by the colonial government The kipande system taxation on Africans Poor wages and poor working conditions Harry Thuku held public meetings where he addressed the evils of colonial rule. he advocated on total liberation of African land from the colonial government Thuku through YKA sent a document containing the grievances to the Native commissioner O.H. Watkins but never sorted them out. Harry Thuku felt that YKA was not effective as such and he formed EAA in July 1921 to give it a national outlook Harry Thuku's idea was to recruit a bigger representation and a more sound organization that would fight for change even outside Kenya's boundaries
