= Kipande =

Former identity document in Kenya

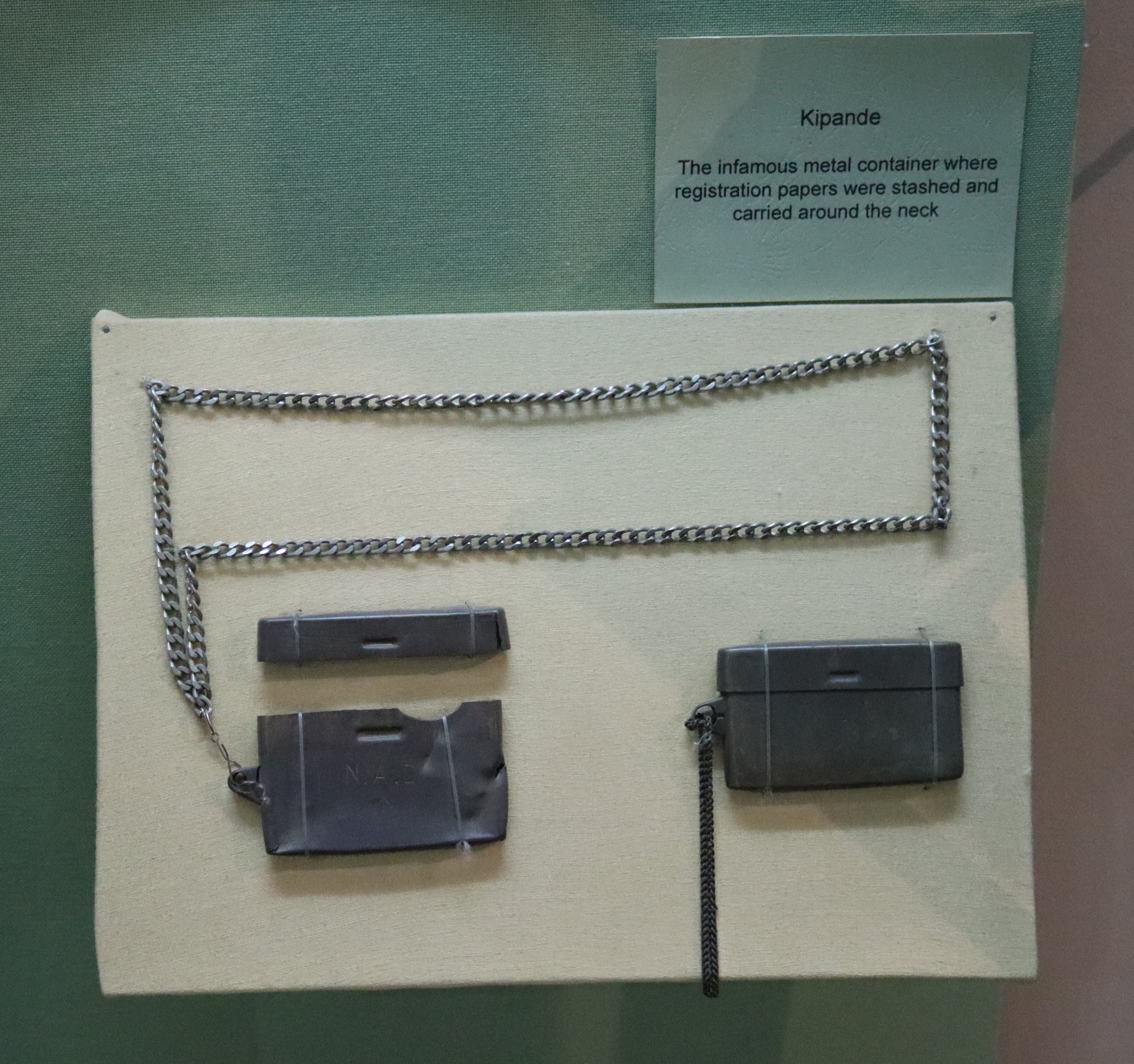
The case for a kipande with the chain by which it was hung around the neck.

The kipande was an identity document during the British-ruled Kenya Colony and featured basic personal details, fingerprints and an employment history.

The Native Registration Amendment Ordinance of 1920 made it compulsory for African males above the age of 15 to wear it at all times around their necks. The effect of its adoption was to restrict the mobility of Africans radically. The main intent of the policy was supposedly to keep track of the labour pool efficiently.

The kipande caused much resentment as all African males were required to wear it at all times around their necks.

The word "Kipande" is also part of some placenames in Kenya.

== History ==
The Kipande was implemented in Kenya in 1919 as a method of labor force control. It was required to have on one's person and if not presented when asked one could be arrested for vagrancy. Only Africans were forced to have Kipandes. White settlers were not subject to this control. The Kipande restricted movement and employment of the indigenous populations of Kenya until its abolishment in 1947. Severe African unrest and colonial tension led to the abandonment of the system.

== See also ==
- Pass laws in South Africa

== Sources ==
- David Anderson (2000), "Master and Servant in Colonial Kenya", Journal of African History, 41:459-485.
- Maxon & Ofcansky (2000), Historical Dictionary of Kenya.
