= GWX =

GWX or gwx may refer to:

- Gua language (ISO 639-3: gwx), Ghana
- Gwal railway station (Station code: GWX), Pakistan
