= South Kyoga languages =

South Kyoga
- Geographic distribution: Busoga, Pallisa District, Kibuku District, Budaka District
- Linguistic classification: Niger–Congo?: Atlantic–Congo; Volta-Congo; Benue–Congo; Bantoid; Southern Bantoid; Bantu; Northeast Bantu; Great Lakes Bantu; West Nyanza; North Nyanza; South Kyoga
- Proto-language: Proto-South Kyoga
- Subdivisions: East Kyoga; Soga

Language codes
- Glottolog: sout3420

The South Kyoga languages are a group of closely related Bantu languages spoken in eastern Uganda.

== History ==
Proto-South Kyoga was spoken in the 1400s AD. During the 1500s AD, Proto-South Kyoga split into early Lusoga and proto-East Kyoga. Early Lusoga spread across the region between the Nile and Mpologoma Rivers and Lake Victoria and Lake Kyoga. Proto-East Kyoga broke up into Gwere and Syan (Rushana) in the early 19th century.
