= Gwere =

Gwere may refer to:

- Gwere people
- Gwere language
