= North Nyanza languages =

North Nyanza
- Ganda-Soga
- Geographic distribution: Buganda, Busoga, Pallisa District, Kibuku District, Budaka District
- Linguistic classification: Niger–Congo?: Atlantic–Congo; Volta-Congo; Benue–Congo; Bantoid; Southern Bantoid; Bantu; Northeast Bantu; Great Lakes Bantu; West Nyanza; North Nyanza
- Proto-language: Proto-North Nyanza
- Subdivisions: Luganda; Singa; South Kyoga

Language codes
- Glottolog: nort3220

The North Nyanza languages are a group of closely related Bantu languages spoken in Central and eastern Uganda.

== History ==
The Proto-North Nyanza homeland was in the northwestern shores of Lake Victoria (Modern Buganda) in the year 500AD. By 1100AD, the descendants of these people were speaking two different languages that had developed out of proto-North Nyanza: early (or pre-) Luganda and proto-South Kyoga. Early Luganda was spoken by those who remained in the original North-Nyanza homeland (the coasts of Buganda) and to the south, west, and north of it. Proto-South Kyoga was developed by those who migrated east across the Nile. By 1500AD, Proto-South Kyoga split into early Lusoga and proto-East Kyoga. Early Lusoga spread across the region between the Nile and Mpologoma Rivers and Lake Victoria and Lake Kyoga. Proto-East Kyoga broke up into Gwere and Syan (Rushana) in the early 19th century.

== Classification ==
North Nyanza is divided into two branches, Luganda and South Kyoga, according to Rhiannon Stephens (Singa remains unclassified):

- North Nyanza
  - Ganda
  - Singa
  - South Kyoga
    - Soga
    - East Kyoga
      - Gwere
      - Syan/Rushana (extinct?)
