= Luganda =

Bantu language of Uganda

Luganda/Ganda
- Oluganda
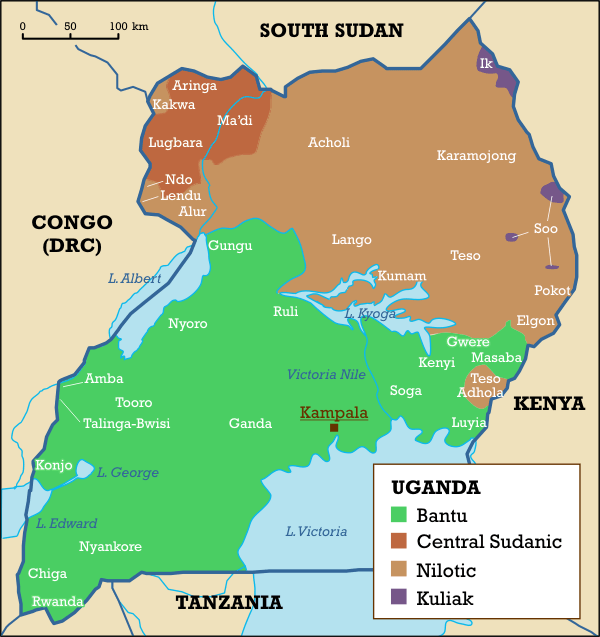
- Pronunciation: [oluɡâːndá]
- Native to: Uganda
- Region: Buganda
- Ethnicity: Baganda
- Speakers: L1: 5.6 million A group photo of Luganda Wikipedians, during a training at Luganda Wikipedia Campaign at Hive Colub.jpg (2014); L2: 5.4 million (2014)
- Language family: Niger–Congo?: Atlantic–Congo; Volta-Congo; Benue–Congo; Bantoid; Southern Bantoid; Bantu; Northeast Bantu; Great Lakes Bantu; West Nyanza; North Nyanza; Luganda/Ganda
- Early form: early Luganda
- Dialects: Ludiope; Luvuma; Sese
- Writing system: Latin script (Ganda alphabet); Ganda Braille

Language codes
- ISO 639-1: lg
- ISO 639-2: lug
- ISO 639-3: lug
- Glottolog: gand1255
- Guthrie code: JE.15

Ganda
- Person: OmuGanda
- People: AbaGanda
- Language: OluGanda
- Country: BuGanda

Ganda or Luganda (/luːˈɡændə/ loo-GAN-də; Oluganda [oluɡâːndá]) is a Bantu language spoken in the African Great Lakes region. It is one of the major languages in Uganda and is spoken by more than 5.56 million Baganda and other people principally in central Uganda, including the country's capital, Kampala. Typologically, it is an agglutinative, tonal language with subject–verb–object word order and nominative–accusative morphosyntactic alignment.

With at least 5.6 million first-language speakers in the Buganda region and 5.4 million second language speakers fluent elsewhere in different regions especially in major urban areas like Mbale, Tororo, Jinja, Gulu, Mbarara, Hoima, Kasese etc. Luganda is Uganda's de facto language of national identity as it is the most widely spoken Ugandan language used mostly in trade in urban areas. The language is also the most-spoken unofficial language in Rwanda's capital Kigali. As a second language, it follows English and precedes Swahili in Uganda.

Lusoga, the language spoken in Busoga to the east of Buganda, is very closely related to Luganda. The two languages are almost mutually intelligible, and have an estimated lexical similarity of between 82% and 86%.

== History ==
Luganda, a Bantu language, shares its roots with other Bantu languages spoken in the African Great Lakes region. Its specific origins remain a subject of scholarly debate, but it's generally accepted that it evolved from Proto-Bantu, the ancestral language of all Bantu languages. During the 18th -19th century, due to interaction with foreign communities, Luganda borrowed a number of loan words from the incoming peoples (Arab traders, missionaries and colonialists), mostly for things that were inexistent in the land, such as a number of words from Arabic like ccaayi from Arabic shay (tea), eddiini (religion), essaala (prayer), and from English, for example essaati (shirt) or emotoka (car).

== Phonology ==
A notable feature of Luganda phonology is its geminate consonants and distinctions between long and short vowels. Speakers generally consider consonantal gemination and vowel lengthening to be two manifestations of the same effect, which they call simply "doubling" or "stressing".

Luganda is also a tonal language; the change in the pitch of a syllable can change the meaning of a word. For example, the word Kabaka means 'king' if all three syllables are given the same pitch. If the first syllable is high then the meaning changes to 'the little one catches' (third person singular present tense Class VI ka- of -baka 'to catch'). This feature makes Luganda a difficult language for speakers of non-tonal languages to learn. A non-native speaker has to learn the variations of pitch by prolonged listening.

Unlike some other Bantu languages, there is no tendency in Luganda for penultimate vowels to become long; in fact they are very frequently short, as in the city name Kampala Kámpalâ, pronounced [káámpálâ], in which the second vowel is short in Luganda.

=== Vowels ===
Luganda vowels
| | Front | Back |
|---|---|---|
| Close | i | u |
| Close-mid | e | o |
| Open | a | |

All five vowels have two forms: long and short. The distinction is phonemic but can occur only in certain positions. After two consonants, the latter being a semivowel, all vowels are long. The quality of a vowel is not affected by its length.

Long vowels in Luganda are very long, more than twice the length of a short vowel. A vowel before a prenasalised consonant, as in Bugáńda 'Buganda' is also lengthened, although it is not as long as a long vowel; laboratory measurements show that the vowel + nasal takes the same length of time to say as a long vowel. Before a geminate, all vowels are short. A segment such as tugg, where a short vowel is followed by a geminate consonant, is very slightly shorter than tuuk or tung.

=== Consonants ===
The table below gives the consonant set of Luganda, grouping voiceless and voiced consonants together in a cell where appropriate, in that order.

| | Labial | Alveolar | Palatal | Velar |
|---|---|---|---|---|
| Plosive | p b | t d | c ɟ (Note: The palatal plosives /c/ and /ɟ/ may be realised with some affrication—either as [cç] and [ɟʝ] or as postalveolars [tʃ] and [dʒ]) | k ɡ |
| Fricative | f v (Note: The labiodental fricatives /f/ and /v/ are slightly labialised and so could also be transcribed [fʷ] and [vʷ] respectively.) | s z | | |
| Nasal | m | n | ɲ | ŋ |
| Approximant | | l~r (Note: The liquids [l] and [r] are allophones of a single phoneme /l~r/, although the distinction is reflected in the orthography.) | j | w |
| Trill | | l~r | | |

Apart from /l~r/, all these consonants can be geminated, even at the start of a word: bbiri /bːíri/ 'two', kitto /cítːo/ 'cold'. The approximants /w/ and /j/ are geminated as /ɡːw/ and /ɟː/: eggwanga /eɡːwáːŋɡa/ 'country'; jjenje /ɟːéːɲɟe/ 'cricket'—from the roots -wanga /wáːŋɡa/ and -yenje /jéːɲɟe/ respectively, with the singular noun prefix e- that doubles the following consonant.

Historically, geminated consonants appear to have arisen when a very close [i] between two consonants dropped out; for example -dduka from *-jiduka 'run'.

Apart from /l~r/, /w/ and /j/, all consonants can also be prenasalised (prefixed with a nasal stop). This consonant will be [m], [n], [ɲ] [ɱ] or [ŋ] according to the place of articulation of the consonant which follows, and belongs to the same syllable as that consonant.

The liquid /l~r/ becomes /d/ when geminated or prenasalised. For example, ndaba /n̩dába/ 'I see' (from the root -laba with the subject prefix n-); eddagala /edːáɡala/ 'leaf' (from the root -lagala with the singular noun prefix e-, which doubles the following consonant).

A consonant cannot be both geminated and prenasalised. When morphological processes require this, the gemination is dropped and the syllable /zi/ is inserted, which can then be prenasalised. For example, when the prefix en- is added to the adjective -ddugavu 'black' the result is enzirugavu /eːnzíruɡavu/.

The nasals /m/, /n/, /ɲ/ and /ŋ/ can be syllabic at the start of a word: nkima /ɲ̩címa/ (or [n̩tʃíma]) 'monkey', mpa /m̩pá/ 'I give', nnyinyonnyola /ɲ̩ɲiɲóɲːola/ or /ɲːiɲóɲːola/ 'I explain'. Note that this last example can be analysed in two ways, reflecting the fact that there is no distinction between prenasalisation and gemination when applied to nasal stops.

=== Tone ===
Luganda is a tonal language, with three tones: high (á), low (à) and falling (â). There are, however, no syllables in Luganda with rising tone [àá], since these automatically become [áá].

There are various types of tones: (a) lexical tones, which are always present in a word, e.g. ekibúga 'city'; (b) phrasal tones, which are automatically added to a word in certain contexts, but which are absent in other contexts (e.g. ekítábó or ekitabo 'book'); (c) plateaux tones, where the pitch remains high between two lexical tones, e.g. kírí mú Úgáńda 'it is in Uganda'; (d) grammatical tones, which are associated with certain tenses or uses of the verb; (e) boundary tones, which affect the last syllable of a word or phrase and can indicate such things as interrogation.

According to one analysis, tones are carried on morae. In Luganda, a short vowel has one mora and a long vowel has two morae. A geminate or prenasalised consonant has one mora. A consonant + semivowel (e.g. gw or ly) also has one mora. A vowel followed by a prenasalised consonant has two morae including the one belonging to the prenasalised consonant. The initial vowel of words like ekitabo 'book' is considered to have one mora, even though such vowels are often pronounced long. No syllable can have more than two morae.

Falling tones can be heard in syllables which have two morae, e.g. those with a long vowel (okukóoká 'to cry'), those with a short vowel followed by a geminate consonant (okubôbbá 'to throb'), those with a vowel followed by a prenasalised consonant (Abagândá 'Baganda people'), and those following a consonant plus semivowel (okulwâlá [okulwáalá] 'to fall sick'). They can also be heard on final vowels, e.g. ensî 'country'.

Words in Luganda commonly belong to one of three patterns (other patterns are less common): (a) without lexical tone, e.g. ekitabo 'book'; (b) with one high lexical tone, e.g. ekibúga 'city'; (c) with two high lexical tones, e.g. Kámpalá which link together to make HHH, i.e. [Kámpálá] or [Kámpálâ]. At the end of a sentence, a final lexical tone becomes a falling tone, i.e. [Kámpálâ], but in other contexts, e.g. when the word is used as the subject of a sentence, it remains high: Kámpálá kibúga 'Kampala is a city'.

Although words like ekitabo are theoretically toneless, they are generally subject to a tone-raising rule whereby all but the first mora automatically acquire a high tone. Thus ekitabo 'book' is usually pronounced [e:kítábó] and ssomero 'school' is pronounced [ssóméró] (where the long consonant /ss/ counts as the first mora). These tones automatically added to toneless words are called 'phrasal tones'. The tone-raising rule also applies to the toneless syllables at the end of words like eddwâliro [eddwáalíró] 'hospital' and túgenda [túgeendá] 'we are going', provided that there is at least one low-toned mora after the lexical tone. When this happens, the high tones which follow the low tone are slightly lower than the one which precedes it.

However, there are certain contexts, such as when a toneless word is used as the subject of a sentence or before a numeral, when this tone-raising rule does not apply: Masindi kibúga 'Masindi is a city'; ebitabo kkúmi 'ten books'.

In a sentence, the lexical tones (that is, the high tones of individual words) tend to fall gradually in a series of steps from high to low. For example, in the sentence kye kibúga ekikúlu mu Ugáńda 'it is the chief city in Uganda', the lexical high tones of the syllables bú, kú and gá stand out and gradually descend in pitch, the toneless syllables in between being lower. This phenomenon is called 'downdrift'.

However, there are certain types of phrase, notably those in the form 'noun + of + noun', or 'verb + location', where downdrift does not occur, and instead all the syllables in between the two lexical high tones link together into a 'tonal plateau', in which all the vowels have tones of equal height, for example mu maséréngétá gá Úgáńda 'in the south of Uganda' or kírí mú Úgáńda 'it is in Uganda'. Plateauing also occurs within a word, as in Kámpálâ (see above).

A plateau cannot be formed between a lexical tone and a following phrasal tone; so in the sentence kíri mu Bunyóró 'it is in Bunyoro' there is downdrift, since the tones of Bunyóró are phrasal. But a phrasal tone can and frequently does form a plateau with a following lexical tone or phrasal tone. So in abántú mú Úgáńda 'people in Uganda', there is a plateau from the phrasal tone of abántú to the lexical tone of Ugáńda, and in túgendá mú lúgúúdó 'we are going into the street', there is a plateau from the phrasal tone of túgendá to the phrasal tone of lugúúdó. Again there are certain exceptions; for example, there is no plateau before the words ono 'this' or bonnâ 'all': muntú onó 'this person', abántú bonnâ 'all the people'.

Prefixes sometimes change the tones in a word. For example, Bagáńda [baɡá:nda] 'they are Baganda' has LHHL, but adding the initial vowel a- [a] gives Abagândá [abaɡâ:ndá] 'Baganda people' with a falling tone on ga and phrasal tone on the final syllable.

Different verb tenses have different tonal patterns. The tones of verbs are made more complicated by the fact that some verbs have a high lexical tone on the first syllable of the root, while others do not, and also by the fact that the sequence HH generally becomes HL by a rule called Meeussen's rule. Thus asóma means 'he reads', but when the toneless prefix a- 'he/she' is replaced by the high-toned prefix bá- 'they', instead of básóma it becomes básomá 'they read'. The tones of verbs in relative clauses and in negative sentences differ from those in ordinary positive sentences and the addition of an object-marker such as mu 'him' adds further complications.

In addition to lexical tones, phrasal tones, and the tonal patterns of tenses, there are also intonational tones in Luganda, for example, tones of questions. One rather unexpected phenomenon for English speakers is that if a yes–no question ends in a toneless word, instead of a rise, there is a sharp drop in pitch, e.g. lúnó lúgúúdò? 'is this a road?'.

=== Phonotactics ===
Syllables can take any of the following forms:

- V (only as the first syllable of a word)
- CV
- GV
- NCV
- CSV
- GSV
- NCSV

where V = vowel, C = single consonant (including nasals and semivowels but excluding geminates), G = geminate consonant, N = nasal stop, S = semivowel

These forms are subject to certain phonotactic restrictions:

- Two vowels may not appear adjacent to one another. When morphological or grammatical rules cause two vowels to meet, the first vowel is elided or reduced to a semivowel and the second is lengthened if possible.
- A vowel following a consonant–semivowel combination (except [ɡːw]) is always long, except at the end of a word. After [ɡːw] a vowel can be either long or short. At the end of a word, all vowels are pronounced short.
- A vowel followed by a nasal–plosive combination is always long.
- A vowel followed by a geminate is always short. This rule takes precedence over all the above rules.
- The velar plosives /k/ and /ɡ/ may not appear before the vowel [i] or the semivowel [j]. In this position they become the corresponding postalveolar affricates [tʃ] and [dʒ] respectively.
- The consonants /j/, /w/ and /l~r/ cannot be geminated or prenasalised.
- A consonant cannot be both geminated and prenasalised.

The net effect of this is that all Luganda words follow the general pattern of alternating consonant clusters and vowels, beginning with either but always ending in a vowel:

- (V)XVXV...XV

where V = vowel, X = consonant cluster, (V) = optional vowel

This is reflected in the syllabification rule that in writing, words are always hyphenated after a vowel (when breaking a word over two lines). For example, Emmotoka yange ezze 'My car has arrived' would be split into syllables as E‧mmo‧to‧ka ya‧nge e‧zze.

=== Variant pronunciations ===
The palatal plosives /c/ and /ɟ/ may be realised with some affrication — either as [cç] and [ɟʝ] or as postalveolars /tʃ/ and /dʒ/ respectively.

In speech, word-final vowels are often elided in these conditioning environments:

- Word-final /u/ can be silent after /f/, /fː/, /v/ or /vː/
- Word-final /i/ can be silent after /c/, /cː/, /ɟ/ or /ɟː/

For example, ekiddugavu /ecídːuɡavu/ 'black' may be pronounced [ecídːuɡavʷu] or [ecídːuɡavʷ]. Similarly lwaki /lwáːci/ 'why' may be pronounced [lwáːci], [lwáːc] or [lwáːtʃ].

Long vowels before prenasalised fricatives (that is, before /nf/, /nv/, /ns/ or /nz/) may be nasalised, and the nasal is then often elided. Additionally, when not elided (for example phrase-initially), the /n/ usually becomes a labiodental in /nf/, /nv/. For example:

- nfa /nfa/ 'I'm dying' is pronounced [ɱfʷa]
- musanvu /musáːnvu/ 'seven' may be pronounced [musáːɱvʷu], [musãːɱvʷu], [musãːvʷu] or [musãːɱvʷ]
- tonsaba /toːnsába/ 'don't ask me' may be pronounced [toːnsába], [tõːsába] or [tõːnsába]

The liquid /l~r/ has two allophones [l] and [r], conditioned by the preceding vowel. It is usually realised as a tap or flap [ɾ] after a front unrounded vowel (i.e. after /e/, /eː/, /i/ or /iː/), and as a lateral approximant [l] elsewhere. However, there is considerable variation in this, and using one allophone instead of the other causes no ambiguity. So lwaki /lwáːci/ 'why' may also be pronounced [rwáːci], [ɾwáːci], [ɹwáːtʃi] etc.

=== Alternative analysis ===
Treating the geminate and prenasalised consonants as separate phonemes yields the expanded consonant set below:

| | Labial | Alveolar | Palatal | Velar |
|---|---|---|---|---|
| Simple plosive | p b | t d | c ɟ | k ɡ |
| Geminate plosive | pː bː | tː dː | cː ɟː | kː ɡː |
| Prenasalised plosive | ᵐp ᵐb | ⁿt ⁿd | ᶮc ᶮɟ | ᵑk ᵑɡ |
| Simple fricative | f v | s z | | |
| Geminate fricative | fː vː | sː zː | | |
| Prenasalised fricative | ᶬf ᶬv | ⁿs ⁿz | | |
| Simple nasal | m | n | ɲ | ŋ |
| Geminate nasal | mː | nː | ɲː | ŋː |
| Approximant | | | j | w |
| Liquid | | l | | |

This simplifies the phonotactic rules so that all syllables are of one of three forms:

- V (only as the first syllable of a word)
- CV
- CSV

where V = vowel, C = consonant (including geminate and prenasalised consonants), N = nasal stop, S = semivowel (i.e. either /j/ or /w/).

Vowel length is then only distinctive before simple consonants (i.e. simple plosives, simple fricatives, simple nasals, approximants and liquids)—not before geminate or nasalised consonants or at the end of a word.

== Orthography ==
Luganda spelling, which has been standardized since 1947, uses a Latin alphabet, augmented with one new letter ŋ and a digraph ny, which is treated as a single letter. It has a very high sound-to-letter correspondence: one letter usually represents one sound and vice versa.

The distinction between simple and geminate consonants is always represented explicitly: simple consonants are written single, and geminates are written double. The distinction between long and short vowels is always made clear from the spelling but not always explicitly: short vowels are always written single; long vowels are written double only if their length cannot be inferred from the context. Stress and tones are not represented in the spelling.

The following phonemes are always represented with the same letter or combination of letters:

- Short vowels (always spelt a, e, i, o, u)
- All consonants apart from /l~r/, /c/ and /ɟ/
- The palatals /c/ and /ɟ/, when followed by a short vowel (always spelt c, j), except when the short vowel is itself followed by a geminate consonant, or when the vowel is /i/

The following phonemes can be represented with two letters or combinations of letters, with the alternation predictable from the context:

- Long vowels (spelt a, e, i, o, u where short vowels are impossible; aa, ee, ii, oo, uu elsewhere)
- The liquid /l~r/ (spelt r after e or i; l elsewhere)

The following phonemes can be represented with two letters or combinations of letters, with unpredictable alternation between the two:

- The palatals /c/ and /ɟ/, when followed by a long vowel, or by a short vowel and a geminate consonant, or by an i sound (/i/ or /iː/) (spelt with c, j, with ky, gy, or, before i, with k, g).

It is therefore possible to predict the pronunciation of any word (with the exception of stress and tones) from the spelling. It is also usually possible to predict the spelling of a word from the pronunciation. The only words where this is not possible are those that include one of the affricate–vowel combinations discussed above.

Note, however, that some proper names are not spelled as they are pronounced. For example, Uganda is pronounced as though written Yuganda and Teso is pronounced Tteeso.

=== Vowels ===
The five vowels in Luganda are spelt with the same letters as in many other languages (for example Spanish):

- a /a/
- e /e/
- i /i/
- o /o/
- u /u/

As mentioned above, the distinction between long and short vowels is phonemic and is therefore represented in the alphabet. Long vowels are written as double (when length cannot be inferred from the context) and short vowels are written single. For example:

- bana /bana/ 'four (e.g. people)' vs baana /baːna/ 'children'
- sera /sela/ 'dance' vs seera /seːla/ 'overcharge'
- sira /sila/ 'mingle' vs siira /siːla/ 'walk slowly'
- kola /kola/ 'do' vs koola /koːla/ '(to) weed'
- tuma /tuma/ 'send' vs tuuma /tuːma/ '(to) name'

In certain contexts, phonotactic constraints mean that a vowel must be long, and in these cases it is not written double:

- A vowel followed by a prenasalised consonant
- A vowel that comes after a consonant–semivowel combination—apart from ggw which can be thought of as a geminated w, and ggy which can be thought of as a geminated y (although the latter is less common as this combination is more often spelt jj)

For example:

- ekyuma /ecúːma/ 'metal'
- ŋŋenda /ŋ̍ŋéːnda/ 'I go'

But

- eggwolezo /eɡːwólezo/ 'court house'
- eggwoolezo /eɡːwóːlezo/ 'customs office'

Vowels at the start or end of the word are not written double, even if they are long. The only exception to this (apart from all-vowel interjections such as eee and uu) is yee 'yes'.

=== Consonants ===
With the exception of ny [ɲ], each consonant sound in Luganda corresponds to a single letter. The ny combination is treated as a single letter and therefore does not have any effect on vowel length (see the previous subsection).

The following letters are pronounced approximately as in English:

- b /b/ (sometimes softened to /β/)
- d /d/
- f /f/ ("'f' and 'v' are pronounced with the lips slightly pouted")
- l /l/
- m /m/
- n /n/
- p /p/
- s /s/
- t /t/
- v /v/
- w /w/ ("'w' differs from the English 'w' being much softer")
- y /j/
- z /z/

A few letters have unusual values:

- c /c/
- j /ɟ/
- ny /ɲ/
- ŋ /ŋ/

The letters l and r represent the same sound in Luganda—/l/—but the orthography requires r after e or i, and l elsewhere:

- alinda /alíːnda/ 'she's waiting'
- akirinda /acilíːnda/ (or [aciríːnda]) 'she's waiting for it'

There are also two letters whose pronunciation depends on the following letter:

- k is pronounced [c] (or [tʃ]) before i or y, [k] elsewhere
- g is pronounced [ɟ] (or [dʒ]) before i or y, [ɡ] elsewhere

Compare this to the pronunciation of c and g in many Romance languages. As in the Romance languages the 'softening letter' (in Italian i, in French e, in Luganda y) is not itself pronounced, although in Luganda it does have the effect of lengthening the following vowel (see the previous subsection).

Finally the sounds /ɲ/ and /ŋ/ are spelt n before another consonant with the same place of articulation (in other words, before other palatals and velars respectively) rather than ny and ŋ:

- The combinations /ɲ̩ɲ/ and /ɲː/ are spelt nny
- The combination /ɲj/ is spelt nÿ (the diaeresis shows that the y is a separate letter rather than part of the ny digraph, and the /ɲ/ is spelt n before y as in the above rule; in practice this combination is very rare)
- /ŋ/ is spelt n before k or g (but not before another ŋ)
- /ɲ/ is spelt n before c or j, or before a soft k or g

=== Alphabet ===
The standard Luganda alphabet is composed of twenty-four letters:

- 18 consonants: b, p, v, f, m, d, t, l, r, n, z, s, j, c, g, k, ny, ŋ
- 5 vowels: a, e, i, o, u
- 2 semi-vowels: w, y

Since the last consonant ŋ does not appear on standard typewriters or computer keyboards, it is often replaced by the combination ng' (including the apostrophe). In some non-standard orthographies, the apostrophe is not used, which can lead to confusion with the letter combination ng, which is different from ŋ.

In addition, the letter combination ny is treated as a unique consonant. When the letters n and y appear next to each other, they are written as nÿ, with the diaeresis mark to distinguish this combination from ny.

Other letters (h, q, x) are not used in the alphabet, but are often used to write loanwords from other languages. Most such loanwords have standardised spellings consistent with Luganda orthography (and therefore not using these letters), but these spelling are not often used, particularly for English words.

The full alphabet, including both standard Luganda letters and those used only for loanwords, is as follows:

- Aa, a
- Bb, bba
- Cc, cca
- Dd, dda
- Ee, e
- Ff, ffa
- Gg, gga
- (Hh, ha (Note: The letters h, q and x are included when reciting the alphabet and are usually given their English names (apart from ha).))
- Ii, yi
- Jj, jja
- Kk, kka
- Ll, la
- Mm, mma
- Nn, nna
- (NY Ny ny, nnya or nna-ya) (Note: The digraph ny, although considered a separate letter for orthographic purposes, is generally treated as a combination of n and y for other purposes. It is not included when reciting the alphabet.)
- Ŋŋ, ŋŋa
- Oo, o
- Pp, ppa
- (Qq)
- Rr, eri
- Ss, ssa
- Tt, tta
- Uu, wu
- Vv, vva
- Ww, wa
- (Xx)
- Yy, ya
- Zz, zza

== Grammar ==
Like most Bantu languages, Luganda's grammar can be said to be noun-centric, as most words in a sentence agree with a noun. Agreement is by gender and number and is indicated with prefixes attached to the start of word stems. The following parts of speech agree with nouns in class and number:

- adjective
- verb (for subject and object roles)
- pronoun
- possessive

=== Noun classes ===
NB: In the study of Bantu languages the term noun class is often used to refer to what is called gender in comparative linguistics and in the study of certain other languages. Hereafter, both terms may be used.

There is some disagreement as to how to count Luganda's noun classes. Some authorities count singular and plural forms as two separate noun classes, but others treat the singular-plural pairs as genders. By the former method, there are 17 classes, and by the latter there are 10 since there are two pairs of classes with identical plurals and one class with no singular-plural distinction. The latter method is consistent with the study of non-Bantu languages. Applying the method to Luganda gives ten noun classes, nine of which have separate singular and plural forms. This is the usual way to discuss Luganda but not when discussing Bantu languages, generally. In addition, Luganda has four locative classes, e, ku, mu, and wa.

The following table shows how the ten traditional classes of Luganda map onto the Proto-Bantu noun classes:

| Luganda Class | Number | Proto-Bantu Class |
|---|---|---|
| I (MU-BA) | Singular | 1, 1a |
| I (MU-BA) | Plural | 2 |
| II (MU-MI) | Singular | 3 |
| II (MU-MI) | Plural | 4 |
| III (N) | Singular | 9 |
| III (N) | Plural | 10 |
| IV (KI-BI) | Singular | 7 |
| IV (KI-BI) | Plural | 8 |
| V (LI-MA) | Singular | 5 |
| V (LI-MA) | Plural | 6 |
| VI (KA-BU) | Singular | 12 |
| VI (KA-BU) | Plural | 14 |
| VII (LU-N) | Singular | 11 |
| VII (LU-N) | Plural | 10 |
| VIII (GU-GA) | Singular | 20 |
| VIII (GU-GA) | Plural | 22 |
| IX (KU-MA) | Singular | 15 |
| IX (KU-MA) | Plural | 6 |
| X (TU) | (no distinction) | 13 |

As the table shows, Proto-Bantu's polyplural classes (6 and 10) are treated as separate in this article.

As is the case with most Bantu languages, the distribution of nouns among the classes is essentially arbitrary, but there are some loose patterns:

- Class I contains mainly people, although some inanimate nouns can be found in this class: musajja 'man', kaawa 'coffee'
- Class II contains all sorts of nouns but most of the concrete nouns in Class II are long or cylindrical. Most trees fall into this class: muti 'tree'
- Class III also contains many different types of concepts but most animals fall into this class: embwa 'dog'
- Class IV contains inanimate objects and is the class used for the impersonal 'it': ekitabo 'book'
- Class V contains mainly (but not exclusively) large things and liquids, and can also be used to create augmentatives: ebbeere 'breast', lintu 'giant' (from muntu 'person')
- Class VI contains mainly small things and can be used to create diminutives, adjectival abstract nouns and (in the plural) negative verbal nouns and countries: kabwa 'puppy' (from embwa 'dog'), bunafu 'laziness' (from munafu 'lazy'), butakola 'inaction, not to do' (from kukola 'to do, act'), Bungereza 'Britain, England' (from Mungereza 'British, English person')
- Class VII contains many different things including the names of most languages: Oluganda 'Ganda language', Oluzungu 'English language' (from muzungu 'European, white person')
- Class VIII is rarely used but can be used to create pejorative forms: gubwa 'mutt' (from embwa 'dog')
- Class IX is mainly used for infinitives or affirmative verbal nouns: kukola 'action, to do' (from the verb kola 'do, act')
- Class X, which has no singular–plural distinction, is used for mass nouns, usually in the sense of 'a drop' or 'precious little': tuzzi 'drop of water' (from mazzi 'water'), tulo 'sleep'

The class that a noun belongs to can usually be determined by its prefix:

- Class I: singular (o)mu-, plural (a)ba-
- Class II: singular (o)mu-, plural (e)mi-
- Class III: singular (e)n-, plural (e)n-
- Class IV: singular (e)ki-, plural (e)bi-
- Class V: singular li-, eri-, plural (a)ma-
- Class VI: singular (a)ka-, plural (o)bu-
- Class VII: singular (o)lu-, plural (e)n-
- Class VIII: singular (o)gu-, plural (a)ga-
- Class IX: singular (o)ku-, plural (a)ma-
- Class X: (o)tu-

There are a few cases where prefixes overlap: the singulars of Classes I and II (both beginning with mu-); the singular of Class III and plurals of Classes III and VII (all beginning with n-); and the plurals of Classes V and IX (both ma-). Genuine ambiguity, however, is rare, since even where the noun prefixes are the same, the other prefixes are often different. For example, there can be no confusion between omuntu (Class I) 'person' and omuntu (Class II) 'seat' in the sentences Omuntu ali wano 'The person is here' and Omuntu guli wano 'The seat is here' because the verb prefixes a- (Class I) and gu- (Class II) are different, even if the noun prefixes are the same. The same is true with the singular and plural of Class III: Embwa erya 'The dog is eating' vs Embwa zirya 'The dogs are eating' (compare English The sheep is eating vs The sheep are eating where the noun is invariant but the verb distinguishes singular from plural).

In fact, the plurals of Classes III and VII, and those of Classes V and IX, are identical in all their prefixes (noun, verb, adjective etc.).

Class V uses its noun prefixes somewhat differently from the other classes. The singular noun prefix, eri-, is often reduced to e- with an accompanying doubling of the stem's initial consonant. This happens when the stem begins with a single plosive, or a single nasal stop followed by a long vowel, a nasal stop and then a plosive (called a nasalised stem). For example:

- eggi 'egg'; plural amagi (from stem gi)
- eggwanga 'country'; plural amawanga (from nasalised stem wanga—the w becomes ggw when doubled)
- ejjinja 'cricket'; plural amayinja (from nasalised stem yinja—the y becomes jj when doubled)

Other stems use the full prefix:

- erinnya 'name'; plural amannya (from stem nnya)
- eriiso 'eye'; plural amaaso (from stem yiso)
- eryanda 'battery'; plural amanda (from stem anda)

There are also some nouns that have no prefix. Their genders must simply be learnt by rote:

- Class I: ssebo 'gentleman, sir', nnyabo 'madam', Katonda 'god', kabaka 'king', kyayi (or 'caayi) 'tea', kaawa 'coffee'
- Class III: kkapa 'cat', gomesi 'gomesi (traditional East African women's formal dress)'

Adjectives, verbs, certain adverbs, the possessive and a few special forms of conjunctions are inflected to agree with nouns in Luganda.

=== Nouns ===
Nouns are inflected for number and state.

Number is indicated by replacing the singular prefix with the plural prefix. For example, omusajja 'man', abasajja 'men'; ekisanirizo 'comb', ebisanirizo 'combs'. All word classes agree with nouns in number and class.

State is similar to case but applies to verbs and other parts of speech as well as nouns, pronouns and adjectives. There are two states in Luganda, which may be called the base state and the topic state. The base state is unmarked and the topic state is indicated by the presence of the initial vowel.

The topic state is used for nouns in the following conditions:

- Subject of a sentence
- Object of an affirmative verb (other than the verb 'to be')

The base state is used for the following conditions:

- Object of a negative verb
- Object of a preposition
- Noun predicate (whether or not there is an explicit copula or verb 'to be')

=== Pronouns ===
Luganda has a closed set of pronouns.

==== Personal Pronouns ====
Luganda can have self-standing/independent personal pronouns and pronouns that are prefixed to the verb stem.

===== Self-Standing Pronouns =====
These include nze, ggwe, ye, ffe, mmwe, bo, gwo, gyo, yo, zo, kyo, byo, lyo, go, ko, bwo, lwo, kwo, two, wo and mwo.

- nze 'I, me'
- ggwe 'you'
- ye 'he/she, him/her'
- ffe 'we, us'
- mmwe 'you'
- bo 'they, them'

Note that the sex/gender of referents is not distinguished so one has to be very careful how one translates Luganda pronouns into languages like English. For instance Ye musawo can be translated as "She is a doctor" or as "He is a doctor".

=== Adjectives ===
As in other Niger–Congo languages (as well as most Indo-European and Afro-Asiatic languages), adjectives must agree in gender and number with the noun they qualify. For example:

- omuwala omulungi 'beautiful girl' (Class I, singular)
- abawala abalungi 'beautiful girls' (Class I, plural)
- omuti omulungi 'beautiful tree' (Class II, singular)
- emiti emirungi 'beautiful trees' (Class II, plural)
- emmotoka ennungi 'beautiful/good car(s)' (Class V, singular/plural)

In these examples the adjective -lungi changes its prefix according to the gender (Class I or II) and number (singular or plural) of the noun it is qualifying (compare Italian bella ragazza, belle ragazze, bel ragazzo, bei ragazzi). In some cases the prefix causes the initial l of the stem to change to n or r.

Attributive adjectives agree in state with the noun they qualify, but predicative adjectives never take the initial vowel. Similarly, the subject relative is formed by adding the initial vowel to the verb (because a main verb is a predicate).

=== Adverbs ===
True adverbs in the grammatical sense are far rarer in Luganda than in, say, English, being mostly translated by other parts of speech—for example adjectives or particles. When the adverb is qualifying a verb, it is usually translated by an adjective, which then agrees with the subject of the verb. For example:

- Ankonjera bubi 'She slanders me badly'
- Bankonjera bubi 'They slander me badly'

Here, 'badly' is translated with the adjective -bi 'bad, ugly', which is declined to agree with the subject.

Other concepts can be translated by invariant particles. for example the intensifying particle nnyo is attached to an adjective or verb to mean 'very', 'a lot'. For example: Lukwago anywa nnyo 'Lukwago drinks a lot'.

There are also two groups of true adverb in Luganda, both of which agree with the verbal subject or qualified noun (not just in gender and number but also in person), but which are inflected differently. The first group is conjugated in the same way as verbs and contains only a few words: tya 'how', ti 'like this', tyo 'like that':

- Njogera bwe nti 'I speak like this'
- Abasiraamu basaba bwebati 'Muslims pray like this'
- Enkima erya bweti 'The monkey eats like this'
- Enkima zirya bweziti 'Monkeys eat like this'

The adverb ti 'like this' (the last word in each of the above sentences) is conjugated as a verb to agree with the subject of the sentence in gender, number and person.

The second group takes a different set of prefixes, based on the pronouns. Adverbs in this group include -nna 'all' (or, with the singular, 'any'), -kka 'only', -mbi, -mbiriri 'both' and -nsatule 'all three':

- Nkola nzekka 'I work alone'
- Nzekka nze nkola 'Only I work'
- Ggwe wekka ggwe okola 'Only you work'
- Nze nzekka nze ndigula emmotoka 'Only I will buy the car'
- Ndigula mmotoka yokka 'I will only buy the car'

Note how, in the last two examples, the adverb -kka agrees with whichever antecedent it is qualifying — either the implicit nze 'I' or the explicit emmotoka 'the car'.

Note also, in the first two examples, how the placement of nzekka before or after the verb makes the difference between 'only' (when the adverb qualifies and agrees with the subject—the implicit nze 'I') and 'alone' (when it qualifies the verb nkola 'I work' but agrees with the subject).

=== Possessive ===
The possessive in Luganda is indicated with a different particle for each singular and plural noun class (according to the possessed noun). An alternative way of thinking about the Luganda possessive is as a single word whose initial consonant cluster is altered to agree with the possessed noun in class and number.

Depending on the possessed noun, the possessive takes one of the following forms:

- Singular wa, plural ba (Class I)
- Singular gwa, plural gya (Class II)
- Singular ya, plural za (Class III)
- Singular kya, plural bya (Class IV)
- Singular lya, plural ga (Class V)
- Singular ka, plural bwa (Class VI)
- Singular lwa, plural za (Class VII)
- Singular gwa, plural ga (Class VIII)
- Singular kwa, plural ga (Class IX)
- Twa (Class X)

If the possessor is a personal pronoun, the separate possessive form is not used. Instead, the following personal possessives are used:

- Wange 'my', wo 'your (singular possessor)', we 'his, her'; waffe 'our', wammwe 'your (plural possessor)', waabwe 'their' (Class I, singular possessed noun)
- Bange 'my', bo 'your (singular possessor)', be 'his, her'; baffe 'our', bammwe 'your (plural possessor)', baabwe 'their' (Class I, plural possessed noun)
- Gwange 'my', gwo 'your (singular possessor)', gwe 'his, her'; gwaffe 'our', gwammwe 'your (plural possessor)', gwabwe 'their' (Class II, singular possessed noun)
- Gyange 'my', gyo 'your (singular possessor)', gye 'his, her'; gyaffe 'our', gyammwe 'your (plural possessor)' gyabwe 'their' (Class II, plural possessed noun)
- Yange 'my', yo 'your', etc. (Class III, singular possessed noun)
- Etc.

There are also a few nouns that take special forms when used with a possessive:

- Kitange 'my father', kitaawo 'your (singular) father', kitaawe 'his/her father'

=== Verbs ===
==== Subjects ====
As in other Bantu languages, every verb must also agree with its subject in gender and number (as opposed to number only as in Indo-European languages). For example:

- omusajja anywa 'the man is drinking' (Class I, singular)
- abasajja banywa 'the men are drinking' (Class I, plural)
- embuzi enywa 'the goat is drinking' (Class III, singular)
- embuzi zinywa 'the goats are drinking' (Class III, plural)
- akaana kanywa 'the baby/infant is drinking' (Class VI, singular)
- obwana bunywa 'the babies/infants are drinking' (Class VI, plural)

Here, the verb nywa changes its prefix according to the gender and number of its subject.

Note, in the third and fourth examples, how the verb agrees with the number of the noun even when the noun does not explicitly reflect the number distinction.

The subject prefixes for the personal pronouns are:

- First person: singular n- 'I', plural tu- 'we'
- Second person: singular o- 'you (singular)', mu- 'you (plural)'
- Third person: singular a- 'he, she', ba- 'they (Class I)'

For impersonal pronouns the subject prefixes are:

- Class I: singular a-, plural ba- (i.e. the third person prefixes shown directly above)
- Class II: singular gu-, plural gi-
- Class III: singular e-, plural zi-
- Class IV: singular ki-, plural bi-
- Class V: singular li-, plural ga-
- Class VI: singular ka-, plural bu-
- Class VII: singular lu-, plural zi-
- Class VIII: singular gu-, plural ga-
- Class IX: singular ku-, plural ga-
- Class X: tu-

==== Objects ====
When the verb governs one or more objects, there is also an agreement between the object prefixes and the gender and number of their antecedents:

- mmunywa 'I drink it (e.g. coffee)' (kaawa 'coffee', Class I singular)
- nganywa 'I drink it (e.g. water)' (amazzi 'water', Class IX plural)

As with the subject prefix, the third person prefixes also agree with their antecedents in person. The personal object prefixes are:

- First person: singular n- 'me', plural tu- 'us'
- Second person: singular ku- 'you (singular)', ba- 'you (plural)'
- Third person: singular mu- 'him, her', ba- 'them (Class I)'

For the impersonal third person the object prefixes are:

- Class I: singular mu-, plural ba- (i.e. the third person prefixes shown directly above)
- Class II: singular gu-, plural gi-
- Class III: singular gi-, plural zi-
- Class IV: singular ki-, plural bi-
- Class V: singular li-, plural ga-
- Class VI: singular ka-, plural bu-
- Class VII: singular lu-, plural zi-
- Class VIII: singular gu-, plural ga-
- Class IX: singular ku-, plural ga-
- Class X: tu-

Note the similarity between each subject prefix and the corresponding object prefix: they are the same in all cases except Class I and the singular of Class III. Note also the correspondence between the object prefixes and the noun prefixes (see Nouns above): when every m- in the noun prefix is replaced by a g- in the object prefix, the only differences are in Classes I and III.

The direct object prefix is usually inserted directly after the subject prefix:

- nkiridde 'I have eaten it' (n- subject 'I' + ki- object 'it' + -ridde verb 'ate')

The indirect object prefix comes after the direct object:

- nkimuwadde 'I have given it to him' (n- subject 'I' + ki- object 'it' + mu- object '(to) him' + -wadde verb 'gave')

==== Negative ====
The negative is usually formed by prefixing te- or t- to the subject prefix, or, in the case of the first person singular, replacing the prefix with si-. This results in the following set of personal subject prefixes:

- First person: singular si- 'I', plural tetu- 'we'
- Second person: singular to- 'you (singular)', temu- 'you (plural)'
- Third person: singular ta- 'he, she', teba- 'they (Class I)'

The negative impersonal subject prefixes are:

- Class I: singular ta-, plural teba- (i.e. the third person prefixes shown directly above)
- Class II: singular tegu-, plural tegi-
- Class III: singular te-, plural tezi-
- Class IV: singular teki-, plural tebi-
- Class V: singular teri-, plural tega-
- Class VI: singular teka-, plural tebu-
- Class VII: singular telu-, plural tezi-
- Class VIII: singular tegu-, plural tega-
- Class IX: singular teku-, plural tega-
- Class X: tetu-

When used with object relatives or the narrative tense (see below), the negative is formed with the prefix ta-, which is inserted after the subject and object affixes:

- Omuntu gwe nnalabye 'The person whom I saw'
- Omuntu gwe ssalabye 'The person whom I didn't see'

==== Modified stems ====
To form some tenses, a special form of the verb stem, called the 'modified form', is used. This is formed by making various changes to the final syllable of the stem, usually involving either changing the final syllable to one of the following suffixes:

- -se
- -sse
- -ze
- -zze
- -izze
- -ezze
- -nye
- -nyi
- -ye
- -de
- -dde

The modified form of verb stems is the only real source of irregularity in Luganda's verbal system. Monosyllabic verbs, in particular, have unpredictable modified forms:

- okuba 'to be' -badde
- okufa 'to die' -fudde
- okugaana 'to deny, forbid' -gaanyi
- okuggwa 'to end' (intransitive) -wedde
- okuggya 'to remove' -ggye or -ggyidde
- okuggya 'to cook' (intransitive) -yidde
- okugwa 'to fall' -gudde
- okujja 'to come' -zze
- okukka 'to go down, come down' -sse
- okukwata 'to catch' -kutte
- okulwa 'to delay' -ludde
- okulya 'to eat' -lidde
- okumanyi 'to find out, realise' -manyi
- okunywa 'to drink' -nywedde
- okuta 'to release' -tadde
- okuteeka 'to put' -tadde
- okutta 'to kill' -sse
- okutwaka 'to take' -tutte
- okutya 'to be afraid' -tidde
- okuva 'to come from' -vudde
- okuwa 'to give' -wadde
- okuyita 'to call' -yise
- okuyita 'to pass' -yise

==== Tense and mood ====
Tense–aspect–mood in Luganda is explicitly marked on the verb, as it is in most other Bantu languages.

===== Present tense =====
The present tense is formed by simply adding the subject prefixes to the stem. The negative is formed in the same way but with the negative subject prefixes (this is the usual way of forming the negative in Luganda).

Examples of present tense inflection
| Inflection | Gloss | Negative | Gloss |
|---|---|---|---|
| nkola | 'I do' | sikola | 'I don't do' |
| okola | 'you do' | tokola | 'you don't do' |
| akola | 'he, she does' | takola | 'he, she doesn't do' |
| tukola | 'we do' | tetukola | 'we don't do' |
| mukola | 'you (plural) do' | temukola | 'you (plural) don't do' |
| bakola | 'they (class I) do' | tebakola | 'they (class I) don't do' |
| gukola | 'it (class II) does' | tegukola | 'it (class II) doesn't do' |
| bikola | 'they (class IV) do' | tebikola | 'they (class IV) don't do' |
| zikola | 'they (class VII) do' | tezikola | 'they (class VII) don't do' |

The present perfect is just the subject prefix plus the modified stem:

- nkoze 'I have done'
- okoze 'you have done'
- akoze 'he, she has done'
- tukoze 'we have done'
- mukoze 'you (plural) have done'
- bakoze 'they (class I) have done'

The present perfect in Luganda is sometimes slightly weaker in its past meaning than in English. It is often used with intransitive verbs with the sense of being in the state of having done something. For example, baze azze means 'my husband has arrived' (using the present perfect form -zze of the verb jja 'to come'); ŋŋenze usually means 'I'm off' rather than 'I have gone'. But to say I have done in Muganda would usually use one of the past tenses nnakoze or nnakola 'I did' because kola is a transitive verb.

The present perfect is also used to show physical attitude. For example, using the verb okutuula 'to sit down': ntuula (present tense) means 'I am in the process of sitting myself down'; to say 'I'm sitting down' in the usual sense of 'I'm seated' in standard English, a Muganda would use the present perfect: ntudde (as in certain non-standard varieties of British English).

===== Past tenses =====
The near past is formed by inserting the prefix -a- before the modified form of the stem. This prefix, being a vowel, has the effect of changing the form of the subject prefixes:

- nnakoze 'I did'
- wakoze 'you did'
- yakoze 'he, she did'
- twakoze 'we did'
- mwakoze 'you (plural) did'
- baakoze 'they (class I) did'
- ...

The near past tense is used for events that have happened in the past 18 hours. The negative is formed in the usual way.

The far past is formed with the same prefix a- as the near past, but using the simple form of the stem:

- nnakola 'I did'
- wakola 'you did'
- yakola 'he, she did'
- twakola 'we did'
- mwakola 'you (plural) did'
- baakola 'they (class I) did'
- ...

The far past tense is used for events that happened more than 18 hours ago, and can also be used as a weak pluperfect. This is the tense that is used in novels and storytelling.

===== Future tenses =====
The near future is used when describing things that are going to happen within the next 18 hours. It is formed with the prefix naa- on the simple form of the stem:

- nnaakola 'I shall do'
- onookola 'you will do'
- anaakola 'he, she will do'
- tunaakola 'we shall do'
- munaakola 'you (plural) will do'
- banaakola 'they (class I) will do'
- eneekola 'they (class III) will do'
- zinaakola 'they (class III) will do'
- ...

In the second person singular and the singular of Class III, the prefix becomes noo- and nee- in harmony with the subject prefix.

The negative form of this tense is formed by changing the final -a of the stem to an -e and using vowel-lengthened negative subject prefixes; no tense prefix is used:

- siikole 'I shan't do'
- tookole 'you won't do'
- taakole 'he, she won't do'
- tetuukole 'we shan't do'
- temuukole 'you (plural) won't do'
- tebaakole 'they (class I) won't do'
- teguukole 'it (class II) won't do'
- tegiikole 'they (class II) won't do'
- teekole 'he, she, it (class III) won't do'
- teziikole 'they (class III) won't do'
- ...

The far future is used for events that will take place more than 18 hours in the future. It is formed with the prefix li- on the simple form of the stem:

- ndikola 'I shall do'
- olikola 'you will do'
- alikola 'he, she will do'
- tulikola 'we shall do'
- mulikola 'you (plural) will do'
- balikola 'they (class I) will do'
- ...

Note how the l of the tense prefix becomes a d after the n- of the first person singular subject prefix.

===== Other =====
The conditional mood is formed with the prefix andi- and the modified form of the stem:

- nnandikoze 'I would do'
- wandikoze 'you would do'
- yandikoze 'he, she would do'
- twandikoze 'we would do'
- mwandikoze 'you (plural) would do'
- bandikoze 'they (class I) would do'

The subjunctive is formed by changing the final -a of the stem to an -e:

- nkole 'I may do'
- okole 'you may do'
- akole 'he, she may do'
- tukole 'we may do'
- mukole 'you may do'
- bakole 'they may do'

The negative is formed either with the auxiliary verb lema ('to fail') plus the infinitive:

- nneme kukola 'I may not do'
- oleme kukola 'you may not do'
- aleme kukola 'he, she may not do'
- tuleme kukola 'we may not do'
- muleme kukola 'you may not do'
- baleme kukola 'they may not do'

or using the same forms as the negative of the near future:

- siikole 'I may not do'
- tookole 'you may not do'
- taakole 'he, she may not do'
- tetuukole 'we may not do'
- temuukole 'you may not do'
- tebaakole 'they may not do'

Luganda has some special tenses not found in many other languages. The 'still' tense is used to say that something is still happening. It is formed with the prefix kya-:

- nkyakola 'I'm still doing'
- okyakola 'you're still doing'
- akyakola 'he, she is still doing'
- tukyakola 'we're still doing'
- mukyakola 'you're still doing'
- bakyakola 'they're still doing'

In the negative it means 'no longer':

- sikyakola 'I'm no longer doing'
- tokyakola 'you're no longer doing'
- takyakola 'he, she is no longer doing'
- tetukyakola 'we're no longer doing'
- temukyakola 'you're no longer doing'
- tebakyakola 'they're no longer doing'

With intransitive verbs, especially verbs of physical attitude (see Present Perfect above), the kya- prefix can also be used with the modified verb stem to give a sense of 'still being in a state'. For example, nkyatudde means 'I'm still seated'.

The 'so far' tense is used when talking about what has happened so far, with the implication that more is to come. It is formed with the prefix aaka-:

- nnaakakola 'I have so far done'
- waakakola 'you have so far done'
- yaakakola 'he, she has so far done'
- twaakakola 'we have so far done'
- mwaakakola 'you have so far done'
- baakakola 'they have so far done'

This tense is found only in the affirmative.

The 'not yet' tense, on the other hand, is found only in the negative. It is used to talk about things that have not happened yet (but which may well happen in the future), and is formed with the prefix nna-:

- sinnakola 'I haven't yet done'
- tonnakola 'you haven't yet done'
- tannakola 'he, she hasn't yet done'
- tetunnakola 'we haven't yet done'
- temunnakola 'you haven't yet done'
- bannakola 'they haven't yet done'

When describing a series of events that happen (or will or did happen) sequentially, the narrative form is used for all but the first verb in the sentence. It is formed by the particle ne (or n’ before a vowel) followed by the present tense:

- Nnagenda ne nkuba essimu 'I went and made a phone call'
- Ndigenda ne nkuba essimu 'I'll go and make a phone call'

The narrative can be used with any tense, as long as the events it describes are in immediate sequence. The negative is formed with the prefix si- placed immediately after the object prefixes (or after the subject prefix if no object prefixes are used):

- Saagenda era ssaakuba ssimu 'I didn't go and did not make a phone call'
- Sirigenda era ssirikuba ssimu 'I won't go and will not make a phone call'
- Ssigenze era ssikubye 'I haven't gone to make it yet'

Compare this with the negative construction used with the object relatives.

==== Auxiliary verbs ====
Other tenses can be formed periphrastically, with the use of auxiliary verbs. Some of Luganda's auxiliary verbs can also be used as main verbs; some are always auxiliaries:

- okuba 'to be': used with an optional nga with another finite verb to form compound tenses
- okujja 'to come': forms a future tense when used with the infinitive of the main verb
- okulyoka or okulyokka (only used as an auxiliary): appears with another finite verb, usually translated 'and then' or (in the subjunctive) 'so that'
- okumala 'to finish': used with the infinitive to denote completed action, or with the stem of the main verb prefixed with ga- to mean 'whether one wants to or not'
- okutera (only used as an auxiliary): used with the infinitive of the main verb to mean (in the present tense) 'to tend to' or (in the near future) 'about to'
- okuva 'to come from': followed by the main verb in the infinitive, means 'just been'
- okulema 'to fail': used with the infinitive to form negatives

==== Derivational affixes ====
The meaning of a verb can be altered in an almost unlimited number of ways by means of modifications to the verb stem. There are only a handful of core derivational modifications, but these can be added to the verb stem in virtually any combination, resulting in hundreds of possible compound modifications.

The passive is produced by replacing the final -a with -wa or -ibwa/-ebwa:

- okulaba 'to see' → okulabwa 'to be seen'

The reflexive is created by adding the prefix e- to the verb stem (equivalent to replacing the oku- prefix of the infinitive with okwe-):

- okutta 'to kill' → okwetta 'to kill oneself'

Many verbs are used only in their reflexive form:

- okwebaka 'to sleep' (simple form *okubaka is not used)
- okwetaga 'to need' (simple form *okutaga is not used)

Reduplication is formed by doubling the stem, and generally adds the sense of repetition or intensity:

- okukuba 'to strike' → okukubaakuba 'to batter'

The applied, or prepositional, modification, allows the verb to take an extra object and gives it the meaning 'to do for or with (someone or something)'. It is formed with the suffix ir- inserted before the final -a of the verb:

- okukola 'to work' → okukolera 'to work for (an employer)'
- okwebaka 'to sleep' → okwebakira 'to sleep on (e.g. a piece of furniture)'

Adding the applied suffix twice gives the 'augmentative applied' modification, which has an alternative applied sense, usually further removed from the original sense than the simple applied modification:

- okukola 'to work' → okukozesa 'to utilise, employ'

The causative is formed with various changes applied to the end of the verb, usually involving the final -a changing to -ya, -sa or -za. It gives a verb the sense of 'to cause to do', and can also make an intransitive verb transitive:

- okulaba 'to see' → okulabya 'to show' (more commonly "okulaga", a different verb, is used).
- okufuuka 'to become' → okufuusa 'to turn (something or someone) into (something else)'

Applying two causative modifications results in the 'second causative':

- okulaba 'to see' → okulabya 'to show' → okulabisa 'to cause to show'

The neuter modification, also known as the stative, is similar to the '-able' suffix in English, except that the result is a verb meaning 'to be x-able' rather than an adjective meaning 'x-able'. It is formed by inserting the suffix -ik/-ek before the verb's final -a:

- okukola 'to do' → okukoleka 'to be possible'
- okulya 'to eat' → okuliika 'to be edible'

The intransitive conversive modification reverses the meaning of an intransitive verb and leaves it intransitive, or reverses the meaning of a transitive verb and makes it intransitive, similar to English's 'un-' prefix. It is formed with the prefix uk- inserted before the verb's final -a:

- okukyala 'to pay a visit' → okukyaluka 'to end one's visit, to depart'

The transitive conversive is similar to the intransitive conversive except that it results in a transitive verb. In other words, it reverses the meaning of an intransitive verb and makes it transitive, or reverses the meaning of a transitive verb and leaves it transitive. It is formed with the suffix ul-:

- okukola 'to do' → okukolula 'to undo'
- okusimba 'to plant' → okusimbula 'to uproot'
- okukyala 'to pay a visit' → okukyalula 'to send off'

Two conversive suffixes create the augmentative conversive modification:

- okulimba 'to deceive' → okulimbulula 'to disabuse, set straight'

The reciprocal modification is formed with the suffix -na or -gana (or less commonly -ŋŋa):

- okulaba 'to see' → okulabagana 'to see one another'
- okutta 'to kill' → okuttaŋŋana 'to kill each other'

The progressive is formed with the suffix -nga. It is used with finite verbs to give the sense of continuousness:

- ndimukuuma 'I'll look after him' → ndimukuumanga 'I'll always look after him'
- tosinda 'don't whinge' → tosindanga 'never whinge'
- tobba 'don't steal' → tobbanga 'thou shalt not steal'

This is not really a modification but a clitic, so it is always applied 'after' any grammatical inflexions.

==== Combinations of modifications ====
More than one modification can be made to a single stem:

- okukolulika 'to be undo-able (i.e. reversible)' — conversive neuter: kola → kolula → kolulika
- okusimbuliza 'to transplant' — conversive applied causative: simba → simbula → simbulira → simbuliza
- okulabaalabana 'to look around oneself, be distracted' — reduplicative reciprocal: laba → labaalaba → labaalabana
- okulabaalabanya 'to distract' — reduplicative reciprocal causative: laba → labaalaba → labaalabana → labaalabanya
- okwebakiriza 'to pretend to sleep' — reflexive augmentative applied causative baka → ebaka → ebakira (applied) → ebakirira (augmentative applied) → ebakiriza

There are some restrictions that apply to the combinations in which these modifications can be made. For example, the 'applied' modification cannot be made to a causative stem; any causative modifications must first be removed, the applied modification made and the causative modifications then reapplied. And since the reflexive is formed with a prefix rather than a suffix, it is impossible to distinguish between, for example, reflexive causative and causative reflexive.

== Numbers ==
The Luganda system of cardinal numbers is quite complicated. The numbers 'one' to 'five' are specialised numerical adjectives that agree with the noun they qualify. The words for 'six' to 'ten' are numerical nouns that do not agree with the qualified noun.

'Twenty' to 'fifty' are expressed as multiples of ten using the cardinal numbers for 'two' to 'five' with the plural of 'ten'. 'Sixty' to 'one hundred' are numerical nouns in their own right, derived from the same roots as the nouns for 'six' to 'ten' but with different class prefixes.

In a similar pattern, 'two hundred' to 'five hundred' are expressed as multiples of a hundred using the cardinal numbers with the plural of 'hundred'. Then 'six hundred' to 'one thousand' are nouns, again derived from the same roots as 'six' to 'ten'. The pattern repeats up to 'ten thousand', then standard nouns are used for 'ten thousand', 'one hundred thousand' and 'one million'.

The words used for this system are:

Numerical adjectives (declined to agree with the qualified noun):

- emu (omu, limu, kamu, kimu, ...) 'one'
- bbiri (babiri, abiri, ...) 'two'
- ssatu (basatu, asatu, ...) 'three'
- nnya (bana, ana, ...) 'four'
- ttaano (bataano, ataano, ...) 'five'

Numerical nouns:

- 'Six' to 'ten' (Classes II and V)
  - mukaaga 'six' (Class II)
  - musanvu 'seven'
  - munaana 'eight'
  - mwenda 'nine'
  - kkumi 'ten'; plural amakumi (Class V)
- 'Sixty' to 'one hundred' (Classes III and IV)
  - nkaaga 'sixty' (Class III)
  - nsanvu 'seventy'
  - kinaana 'eighty' (Class IV)
  - kyenda 'ninety'
  - kikumi 'one hundred'; plural bikumi
- 'Six hundred' to 'one thousand' (Class VII)
  - lukaaga 'six hundred'
  - lusanvu 'seven hundred'
  - lunaana 'eight hundred'
  - lwenda 'nine hundred'
  - lukumi 'one thousand'; plural nkumi
- 'Six thousand' to 'ten thousand' (Class VI)
  - kakaaga 'six thousand'
  - kasanvu 'seven thousand'
  - kanaana 'eight thousand'
  - kenda 'nine thousand'
  - (archaic) kakumi 'ten thousand'; plural bukumi

Standard nouns:

- omutwalo 'ten thousand'; plural emitwalo (Class II)
- akasiriivu 'one hundred thousand'; plural obusiriivu (Class VI)
- akakadde 'one million'; plural obukadde (Class VI)
- akawumbi 'one billion' (1,000,000,000); plural obuwumbi (Class VI)
- akase 'one trillion' (1,000,000,000,000); plural obuse
- akafukunya 'one quintillion' (1,000,000,000,000,000,000); plural obufukunya (Class VI)
- akasedde 'one septillion' (1,000,000,000,000,000,000,000,000); plural obusedde (Class VI)

Digits are specified from left to right, combined with na (following kkumi) and mu (following any other word). For example:

- 12 kkumi na bbiri (10 + 2)
- 22 amakumi abiri mu bbiri (10 × 2 + 2)
- 65 nkaaga mu ttaano (60 + 5)
- 122 kikumi mu amakumi abiri mu bbiri (100 + 10 × 2 + 2)
- 222 bikumi bibiri mu amakumi abiri mu bbiri (100 × 2 + 10 × 2 + 2)
- 1,222 lukumi mu bikumi bibiri mu amakumi abiri mu bbiri (1,000 + 100 × 2 + 10 × 2 + 2)
- 1,024 lukumi mu amakumi abiri mu nnya (1,000 + 10 × 2 + 4)
- 2,222 nkumi bbiri mu bikumi bibiri mu amakumi abiri mu bbiri (1,000 × 2 + 100 × 2 + 10 × 2 + 2)
- 2,500 nkumi bbiri mu bikumi bitaano (1,000 × 2 + 100 × 5)
- 7,500 kasanvu mu bikumi bitaano (7,000 + 100 × 5)
- 7,600 kasanvu mu lukaaga (7,000 + 600)
- 9,999 kenda mu lwenda mu kyenda mu mwenda (9,000 + 900 + 90 + 9)
- 999,000 obusiriivu mwenda mu omutwalo mwenda mu kenda
- 1,000,000 akakadde (1,000,000)
- 3,000,000 obukadde busatu (1,000,000 × 3)
- 10,000,000 obukadde kkumi (1,000,000 × 10)
- 122,000,122 obukadde kikumi mu amakumi abiri mu bubiri mu kikumi mu amakumi abiri mu bbiri (1,000,000 * (100 + 10 × 2 + 2) + 100 + 10 × 2 + 2)

The numerical adjectives agree with the qualified noun:

- emmotoka emu 'one car' (Class III)
- omukazi omu 'one woman' (Class I)
- emmotoka taano 'five cars'
- abakazi bataano 'five women'

but

- emmotoka kikumi 'a hundred cars'
- abakazi kikumi 'a hundred women'

and

- abasajja kkumi n'omu 'eleven men' (Class I)
- ente kkumi n'emu 'eleven cattle' (Class III)

The forms emu, bbiri, ssatu, nnya and ttaano are used when counting (as well as when qualifying nouns of classes III and VII).

However, a complication arises from the agreement of numerical adjectives with the powers of ten. Since the words for 'ten', 'hundred', 'thousand' and so on belong to different classes, each power of ten can be inferred from the form of the adjective qualifying it, so the plural forms of the powers of ten (amakumi 'tens', bikumi 'hundreds', bukumi 'tens of thousands' — but not nkumi 'thousands') are usually omitted, as long as this does not result in ambiguity.

For example:

- 40 amakumi ana → ana
- 22 amakumi abiri mu bbiri → abiri mu bbiri
- 222 bikumi bibiri mu amakumi abiri mu bbiri → bibiri mu abiri mu bbiri
- 1,024 lukumi mu amakumi abiri mu nnya → lukumi mu abiri mu nnya
- 2,222 nkumi bbiri mu bikumi bibiri mu amakumi abiri mu bbiri → nkumi bbiri mu bibiri mu abiri mu bbiri
- 2,500 nkumi bbiri mu bikumi bitaano → nkumi bbiri mu bitaano
- 7,500 kasanvu mu bikumi bitaano → kasanvu mu bitaano
- 122,000,122 obukadde kikumi mu amakumi abiri mu bubiri mu kikumi mu amakumi abiri mu bbiri → obukadde kikumi mu abiri mu bubiri mu kikumi mu abiri mu bbiri

Note that:

- amanda amakumi ana '40 batteries' cannot be shortened to amanda ana because this means "four batteries", and embwa amakumi ana '40 dogs' cannot be shortened to embwa ana because ana is the form of nnya used with embwa, so this actually means 'four dogs'.
- Nkumi 'thousands' is also not usually omitted because the form the numerical adjectives take when qualifying it is the same as the counting form, so 3,000 will always be rendered nkumi ssatu.

== Sample text ==
Abantu bazaalibwa nga balina eddembe n'obuyinza ebyenkanankana, batondebwa nga balina amagezi era nga basobola okwawula ekirungi n'ekibi bwebatyo, buli omu agwana okuyisa munne nga muganda we.

=== Translation ===
All human beings are born free and equal in dignity and rights. They are endowed with reason and conscience and should act towards one another in a spirit of brotherhood.

(Article 1 of the Universal Declaration of Human Rights)

== Bibliography ==
- Ashton, Ethel O., and others (1954) A Luganda Grammar, London: Longmans, Green.
- Barlon, W. Kimuli (2009) Luganda Language: A connection with Nyanja of Zambia. pp. 04
- Chesswas, J. D. (1963) Essentials of Luganda. Oxford University Press
- Crabtree, W. A. (1902, 1923) Elements of Luganda Grammar. The Uganda Bookshop/Society for Promoting Christian Knowledge
- Dutcher, Katharine & Mary Paster (2008), "Contour Tone Distribution in Luganda" Proceedings of the 27th West Coast Conference on Formal Linguistics, ed. Natasha Abner and Jason Bishop, 123–131. Somerville, MA: Cascadilla Proceedings Project.
- Hubbard, Kathleen (1995) "Toward a theory of phonological and phonetic timing: evidence from Bantu". In Connell, Bruce & Amalia Arvanti (eds), Phonology and Phonetic Evidence: Papers in Laboratory Phonology IV pp. 168–187.
- Hyman, Larry & Francis Katamba (1993) "A new approach to tone in Luganda", in Language. 69. 1. pp. 33–67
- Hyman, Larry & Francis Katamba (2001) "The Word in Luganda"
- Kamoga, F.K. & Stevick, E.W. (1968). Luganda Basic Course. Foreign Service Institute, Washington. Sound files of this course are available free on the Internet.
- Kamoga, F.K & Stevick, E.W. (1968). Luganda Pretraining Program. Foreign Service Institute, Washington.
- Murphy, John D. (1972) Luganda-English Dictionary. Catholic University of America Press.
- Pilkington, G.L. (1911) The Hand-Book Of Luganda. SPCK.
- Snoxall, R.A. (1967) Luganda-English Dictionary. Clarendon Press, Oxford
- Stevick, Earl W.; Kamoga, Frederick Katabazi (1970). Luganda Pretraining Program. Washington, D.C.: Foreign Service Institute.
