= Singa language =

Extinct Bantu language of Uganda

Singa
- Chula
- Native to: Uganda
- Region: Rusinga Island
- Extinct: (date missing)
- Language family: Niger–Congo?: Atlantic–Congo; Benue–Congo; Bantoid; Bantu; Northeast Bantu; Great Lakes Bantu; West Nyanza; North Nyanza; Singa

Language codes
- ISO 639-3: sgm
- Glottolog: sing1266
- Guthrie code: JE.406

Singa is an extinct Bantu language of Uganda.

== Vocabulary ==
Lusinga vocabulary
| gloss | Lusinga |
|---|---|
| arrow | lisuñgu |
| back | nyuma |
| banana | litoki |
