= Lusoga Language Authority =

Promotional Group for Lusoga Language

The Lusoga Language Authority (LULA) is responsible for promoting a standard form of the Lusoga language. The group's activities include research on Lusoga and producing publications in the language. Additionally, the group worked on standardizing Lusoga and published number of books about it including grammar books, dictionaries and stories.

== See also ==
- Language policy
