= Soga language =

Bantu language spoken in Uganda

Soga
- Lusoga
- Native to: Uganda
- Region: Mainly in Busoga region
- Ethnicity: Basoga
- Native speakers: 3.1 million (2014 census)
- Language family: Niger–Congo?: Atlantic–Congo; Volta-Congo; Benue–Congo; Bantoid; Southern Bantoid; Bantu; Northeast Bantu; Great Lakes Bantu; West Nyanza; North Nyanza; Soga
- Dialects: Gabula; Lamogi; Tenga; Kenyi
- Writing system: Latin

Official status
- Official language in: Major language of Uganda, official status unclear/pending...
- Regulated by: Lusoga Language Authority (LULA) (Uganda)

Language codes
- ISO 639-3: Either: xog – Soga lke – Kenyi
- Glottolog: soga1244
- Guthrie code: JE.16

- Person: OmuSoga
- People: AbaSoga
- Language: OluSoga
- Country: BuSoga

Soga, or Lusoga, is a Bantu language spoken by the Soga people of the Busoga region in Eastern Uganda. With over three million speakers, it is one of the major languages of Uganda, after English, Swahili, and Luganda. Lusoga is predominantly spoken within the Busoga region which is mainly within the natural boundaries of Lake Victoria to the south, Lake Kyoga to the north, the Nile river to the west and the Mpologoma ('Lion') river to the east of Namutumba district. It is tonal.

== History and development ==
The Soga language is very similar to the neighbouring languages Luganda and Gwere as all 3 descend from a common ancestor language (Proto-North Nyanza).

The written form of Soga is only as recent as the arrival of the Arab and European traders and missionaries. It first appeared in print in the second half of the nineteenth century.

Soga is used in some primary schools in Busoga as pupils begin to learn English, an official language of Uganda. It is also taught in secondary schools and is offered as a course subject in tertiary institutions such as Busoga University, Kyambogo University and Makerere University.

== Dialects ==
Soga has several dialects dating to the intermingling of people during the early migration period of the 17th and 18th centuries. There were so many dialects that it was difficult to reach agreement on the correct way to spell or pronounce certain words. For instance, in the north of Busoga, there is an 'H' in many words which does not appear in dialects of southern Busoga. Thus Busoga was divided into two dialect zones. Across the northern zone, the dialects Lulamogi and Lupakoyo were spoken. Lupakoyo closely resembled Nyoro. It had a close belt of Runyoro associated dialects running east from Bunyoro, across the northern region of Buganda, across northern Busoga and through Bugwere, which is east of Busoga. In the southern part of Busoga a dialect known as Lutenga was traditionally spoken which resembled Luganda. Related dialects were also spoken in the Ssese Islands, Buvuma Island and eastern Buganda.

But with the establishment of the Lusoga Language Authority (LULA), Busoga Kingdom has promoted a standardised Lusoga language. It has done research on the Lusoga language and published literature in Lusoga. Its publications can be found at the Busoga Cultural Centre Offices library located in the Nile garden in Jinja, Uganda. Others are available in bookshops throughout Busoga and in major bookstores in Kampala and other parts of the country. Some of the more accomplished Lusoga publications include a Lusoga Bible, grammar books, riddles, proverbs, several story books and dictionaries e.g. Eibwanio English/Lusoga – Lusoga/English dictionary. A limited online version is available.

== Phonology ==
=== Vowels ===
| | Front | Central | Back |
|---|---|---|---|
| Close | i | | u |
| Mid | ɛ | | ɔ |
| Open | | a | |

=== Consonants ===
| | | Bilabial | | | Labio- dental | | Dental | | | Alveolar | | | Palatal | Velar | | Glottal |
| | | plain | lab. | pal. | plain | lab. | plain | lab. | pal. | plain | lab. | pal. | Palatal | plain | lab. | Glottal |
|---|---|---|---|---|---|---|---|---|---|---|---|---|---|---|---|---|
| Plosive | voiceless | p | pʷ | pʲ | | | t̪ | (t̪ʷ) | | t | tʷ | tʲ | c | k | kʷ | |
| Plosive | voiced | b | | (bʲ) | | | d̪ | d̪ʷ | d̪ʲ | d | dʷ | dʲ | ɟ | ɡ | ɡʷ | |
| Plosive | prenasal vl. | ᵐp | ᵐpʷ | ᵐpʲ | | | ⁿt̪ | | | ⁿt | ⁿtʷ | ⁿtʲ | ᶮc | ᵑk | ᵑkʷ | |
| Plosive | prenasal vd. | ᵐb | (ᵐbʷ) | (ᵐbʲ) | | | ⁿd̪ | ⁿd̪ʷ | ⁿd̪ʲ | ⁿd | ⁿdʷ | ⁿdʲ | ᶮɟ | ᵑɡ | ᵑɡʷ | |
| Nasal | | m | mʷ | mʲ | | | n̪ | n̪ʷ | n̪ʲ | n | nʷ | nʲ | | ŋ | (ŋʷ) | |
| Fricative | voiceless | | | | f | fʷ | | | | s | sʷ | | (ʃ) | | | h |
| Fricative | voiced | β | βʷ | βʲ | v | vʷ | | | | z | zʷ | | | ɣ | | |
| Fricative | prenasal vl. | | | | ᶬf | | | | | ⁿs | ⁿsʷ | | | | | |
| Fricative | prenasal vd. | | | | ᶬv | (ᶬvʷ) | | | | ⁿz | (ⁿzʷ) | | | | | |
| Flap | | | | | | | | | | ɺ | ɺʷ | ɺʲ | | | | |
| Semivowel | | | | | | | | | | | | | j | w | | |

Sounds in parentheses are attested, but rare.

== Writing system ==
Soga alphabet (Wambi Gulere 2012)
| a | b | bw | by | c | d | dh | e | f | g | gh | ŋ | gw | h | i | j | gy |
| k | kw | ky | l | m | mb | mp | mw | n | nd | ndw | nf | nh | nhw | nw | nk | nkw |
| o | p | th | r | s | shy | sy | t | tw | ty | u | v | w | y | z | zw | zy |

Soga alphabet (Ministry of Education 2016)
| a | aa | b | bb | c | d | dh | e | ee | f | g | gh | i | ii | j | k | l |
| m | n | nh | ŋ | o | oo | p | r | s | t | th | u | uu | v | w | y | z |

== Basic grammar and vocabulary ==
In common with other tonal Bantu languages, Lusoga has a noun class system in which prefixes on nouns mark membership of one of the noun genders. Pronouns, adjectives, and verbs reflect the noun gender of the nominal they refer to. Some examples of noun classes:

=== Possessive prefixes ===
In the Bantu languages around the Lake Victoria region in Uganda, nouns are reflected mainly by changing prefixes: human beings are indicated by the prefix Ba- (plural), and Mu- (singular), and the name of the country Bu-.

- mu- person (singular), e.g. musoga 'native of Busoga land'
- bu- land, e.g. Busoga 'land of the Soga'
- lu- language, e.g. Lusoga 'language of the Soga'
- ba- people, e.g. Basoga 'the Soga people'
- ki- customs or traditions, e.g. kisoga describes religious tradition or culture common to the Soga people.

=== Self-standing pronouns ===
- Nze – 'me'
- Iwe/Imwe – 'you'

=== Always attached to a verb ===
- N – 'I'
- O – 'you' (singular)
- A – 'he/she'
- Tu – 'we/us'
- Mu – 'you' (plural)
- Ba – 'they'

=== Demonstratives ===
- Wano – 'here'
- Kino – 'this (thing)'
- Ono – 'this (person)'
- Oyo – 'that (person)'
- Bino – 'these (things)'
- Bire – 'those (things)'

=== Interrogatives ===
- Ani – 'who'
- Ki – 'what'
- Lwaki – 'why'
- Tya – 'how'

=== Greetings ===
Greeting in Soga is accomplished just as it is in western countries. However, it assumes a more personal nature and just as in the West, its form depends on the time of the day and the elapsed time since the last contact with the greeter.

The following dialogue illustrates the basic form to greet a peer or an elder in a respectful manner:

Person A:
Wasuzotya (osiibyotya) ssebo (nnyabo)? – 'How did you sleep/(How was your day), sir (madam)?'
Person B:
Bulungi, wasuzotya (osiibyotya) ssebo (nnyabo)? – 'Well, how did you sleep (how was your day), sir (madam)?'
Person A:
Bulungi ssebo (nnyabo) – 'Well, sir (madam)'

The personal nature of the greetings ensues when the individual being greeted chooses to answer the question instead of merely responding with good or fine. It is somewhat like being asked, "how do you do?" and responding, "how do you do?" However, in Soga, the individual being greeted is free to actually delve into the fine details.

Additionally, simply drop sir/madam to achieve the same effect as in English. The above dialog only addresses greeting one person because some words change into multiple others e.g. wasuzotya is the combination of a singular prefix (wa – 'you'), word (sula – 'sleep'), and singular postfix (otya – 'how did') spoken as one with a plural form that subsequently becomes mwasuze mutya, which is composed of two distinct words emerging from two different plural prefixes, a word, and the plural form of the postfix. It is sometimes impossible to not separate the plural form.

=== Introductions ===
- Ninze Kateme – 'I am Kateme'

=== Some common verbs ===
When conjugating the verb, remove oku and replace it with the required pronoun i.e. n, o, a, tu, mu, ba.

- Example:
  - okukola – 'to work/to do'
    - nkola – 'I work/do'
    - okola – 'you work/do'
    - akola – 'he/she works/does'
    - tukola – 'we work/do'
    - mukola – 'you work/do' (plural)
    - bakola – 'they work/do'
- okukola – 'to work/to do'
- okusoma – 'to read/to study'
- okunhwa – 'to drink'
- okulya – 'to eat' (the above example does not work with all forms of all words, as some verbs are irregular e.g. the singular form here is Ndya)
- okutambula – 'to walk'
- okuvuga – 'to drive/to ride'
- okusobola – 'to be able to'
- okutwala – 'to carry/to take'
- okuseka – 'to laugh'

=== Numbers ===
| 1–10 | 11–19 | 20–29 | 30–39 | 40–49 |
|---|---|---|---|---|
| 1 – ndala | 11 – ikumi na ndhala | 20 – abiri | 30 – asatu | 40 – anha |
| 2 – ibiri | 12 – ikumi na ibiri | 21 – abiri na ndhala | 31 – asatu na ndhala | 41 – ana na ndhala |
| 3 – isatu | 13 – ikumi na isatu | 22 – abiri na ibiri | | |
| 4 – inha | 14 – ikumi na inha | | | |
| 5 – itaanu | 15 – ikumi na itaanu | | | |
| 6 – mukaaga | 16 – ikumi na mukaaga | | | |
| 7 – musanvu | | | | |
| 8 – munaana | | | | |
| 9 – mwenda | | | | |
| 10 – ikumi | | | | |

After 1 to 10 and 20, 30, 40, the other numbers build off the same pattern.

| 50–99 | 100–500 | 500–900 | 1,000–5,000 | 5,000–10,000 |
|---|---|---|---|---|
| 50 – ataanho | 100 – kikumi | 600 – lukaaga | 1,000 – lukumi | 6,000 – kakaaga |
| 60 – nkaaga | 200 – bibiri | 700 – lusanvu | 2,000 – nkumi ibiri | 7,000 – kasanvu |
| 70 – nsanvu | 300 – bisatu | 800 – lunaana | 3,000 – nkuni isatu | 8,000 – kanaanha |
| 80 – kinaanha | 400 – bina | 900 – lwenda | 4,000 – nkumi ina | 9,000 – kenda |
| 90 – kyenda | 500 – bitaanu | | 5,000 – nkumi itaanu | 10,000 – mutwaalo |

=== Telling the time ===
Hours of darkness in Soga correspond to p.m. to include early morning hours. Essentially, the number representing the current hour simply subtracts six from the number in English. A Musoga waking up at what English speakers would call 10:15 a.m. would instead say essawa erii ikumi na ibiri munkyo ('the time is 4:15 in the morning'). Time is said using the word essaawa, e.g., essaawa ndala – 7 o'clock.

=== Food ===
- emmere – 'food'
- sukaali – 'sugar'
- kaawa – 'coffee'
- amata – 'milk'
- enkoko – 'chicken'
- kajiiko – 'teaspoon'
- sowaani – 'plate'
- sefuliya – 'saucepan'
- kyikopo – 'cup'

=== General phrases and vocabulary ===
- ssente imeka – 'how much' (price)
- ekisenge – '(bed)room'
- meza – 'table'
- enhumba – 'house'
- eifumbiro – 'kitchen'
- olwiigi – 'door'
- entebe – 'chair'
- linda! – 'wait!'
- olugendo – 'journey, trip'
- fuluma – 'get out'
- idho – 'tomorrow'
- idho – 'yesterday'
- mpola – 'slow'
- mangu – 'quick'
- mwami – 'mister'
- mukyala – 'miss'
- mukwano gwange! – 'my friend!'
- banange!/mikwano jange! – 'my friends!' (commonly used as an exclamation)
- wansi/ghansi – 'under'
- songa – 'paternal aunt'
- omuntu – 'person'
- omusaadha – 'man'
- omukazi – 'woman'
- omwaana – 'child'
- omuzungu – 'white man/person'
- mukoirime – 'in-law'
- eitaala – 'lamp'
- omwezi – 'moon, month'

== Kodheyo ==
Kodheyo
- Busoga etebenkere
- Type: Weekly newspaper
- Publisher: Kodheyo Publications
- Editor-in-chief: Cornelius Wambi Gulere
- Founded: 1997
- Ceased publication: 1998
- Language: Lusoga

Kodheyo was a Soga news publication in Uganda that was in print between 1997 and 1998. Kodheyo was founded by Cornelius Wambi Gulere who was also its editor-in-chief and mainly reported on happenings in the Busoga sub-region. Published under Kodheyo Publications Limited, the paper folded in 1997.

== See also ==
- Ugandan monarchies – Uganda's other kingdoms
- Lusoga Language Authority – organization promoting the use of the Lusoga language
