= Gwal railway station =

Railway station in Pakistan

General information
- Owner: Ministry of Railways

Other information
- Station code: GWX

Gwal railway station (Urdu: گول ریلوے اسٹیشن) is located on Bostan-Zhob line between Khanai and Zarghun, in Pakistan.

== See also ==
- List of railway stations in Pakistan
- Pakistan Railways
