= Labialization =

Secondary articulatory feature of sounds in some languages

Labial(-velar)ized with protrusion

◌ʷ

Encoding
- Entity (decimal): &#695;
- Unicode (hex): U+02B7
Image

Labialized with compression

◌ᵝ

Encoding
- Entity (decimal): &#7517;
- Unicode (hex): U+1D5D
Image

Labialization is a secondary articulatory feature of sounds in some languages. Consonants pronounced this way are said to be labialized and are usually transcribed in the International Phonetic Alphabet by affixing a superscript w, ⟨ʷ⟩, to the base letter. Labialized sounds involve the lips while the remainder of the oral cavity produces another sound. The term is normally restricted to consonants. When vowels involve the lips, they are called rounded.

In phonology, "labialization" may also refer to a type of assimilation process.

== Labialized consonants ==
The most common labialized consonants are labialized velars. Most other labialized sounds also have simultaneous velarization, and the process may then be more precisely called labio-velarization. The labialization of bilabial consonants, though generally transcribed with ⟨◌ʷ⟩ as if it were labiovelar, is often a protrusion of the lips without velarization of the tongue.

Labialization has been attested with pulmonic, implosive, ejective and click consonants. All places and manners of pulmonic consonants are attested with labialized variants, with the possible exception of the epiglottals.

== Occurrence ==
Labialization is the most widespread secondary articulation in the world's languages. It is phonemically contrastive in Northwest Caucasian (e.g. Adyghe), Athabaskan, and Salishan language families, among others. This contrast is reconstructed also for Proto-Indo-European, the common ancestor of the Indo-European languages, and it survives in Latin and some Romance languages. It is also found in the Cushitic and Ethio-Semitic languages.

Many dialects of English labializes /r, ʃ, ʒ, tʃ, dʒ/ to various degrees.

A few languages, including Arrernte, have contrastive labialized forms for nearly all of their consonants.

In many Salishan languages, such as Klallam, velar consonants only occur in their labialized forms (except /k/, which occurs in some loanwords); however, uvular consonants occur abundantly labialized and unrounded.

== Types ==
Open-labialized

◌ꟹ

Labiodentalized

◌ᶹ

Labiopalatalized

◌ᶣ

Out of 706 language inventories surveyed by Ruhlen (1976), labialization occurred most often with velar (42%) and uvular (15%) segments and least often with dental and alveolar segments. With non-dorsal consonants, labialization may include velarization as well. Labialization is not restricted to lip-rounding. The following articulations have either been described as labialization or been found as allophonic realizations of prototypical labialization:

- Labiodental frication, found in Abkhaz
- Labiodentalization, including a common idiosyncrasy of English /s/ and /z/, and especially of /r/
- Complete bilabial closure, [d͡b, t͡p, t͡pʼ], found in Abkhaz and Ubykh
- "Labialization" (/w/, /ɡʷ/, and /kʷ/) without noticeable rounding (protrusion) of the lips, found in the Iroquoian languages. It may be that they are compressed.
- Rounding without velarization, found in Shona and in the Bzyb dialect of Abkhaz.

Eastern Arrernte has labialization at all places and manners of articulation; this derives historically from adjacent rounded vowels, as is also the case of the Northwest Caucasian languages. Marshallese also has phonemic labialization as a secondary articulation at all places of articulation except for labial consonants and coronal obstruents.

In North America, languages from a number of families have consonants that are perceptually (auditorily) labialized (and vowels that are perceptually rounded) but which lack any participation of the lips, such as the now-extinct Tillamook.

Similarly to the distinction between the labiopalatal [ɥ] and labiovelar [w] semivowels, some languages exhibit labiopalatalization [ᶣ], contrasting with labiovelarization [ʷ].

=== Prelabialization ===
In Slovene, sounds can be prelabialized. Furthermore, the change is phonemic and all phonemes have prelabialized pairs (though not all of their allophones can have pairs). Compare stati 'stand' [ˈs̪t̪àːt̪í] and vstati 'stand up' [ˈʷs̪t̪àːt̪í]. The prelabialization part, however, is usually not considered as being part of the same phoneme as prelabialized sound, but rather as an allophone of /ʋ/ as it changes depending on the environment, e. g. vzeti 'take' [ˈʷz̪èːt̪í] and povzeti 'summarize' [pou̯ˈz̪èːt̪í]. See Slovene phonology for more details.

== Transcription ==
In the International Phonetic Alphabet, protruded labialization is indicated with a raised ⟨w⟩ modifier [ʷ], as in /kʷ/. There are also diacritics, respectively [ɔ̹], [ɔ̜], to indicate greater or lesser degrees of rounding. These are normally used with vowels but may occur with consonants. For example, in Hupa, an Athabaskan language, voiceless velar fricatives distinguish three degrees of labialization, transcribed either /x/, /x̹/, /xʷ/ or /x/, /x̜ʷ/, /xʷ/.

The VoQS system has two additional symbols for degrees of rounding, originally introduced as part of the extensions to the IPA: Spread [i͍] and open-rounded [ʃꟹ] (as in English and French). It also has a symbol for labiodentalized sounds, [tᶹ], which the IPA Handbook (1999) states may also be used for protruded labialization if ⟨ʷ⟩ is additionally specifying simultaneous velarization.

If precision is desired, the Abkhaz and Ubykh articulations may be transcribed with the appropriate fricative or trill raised as a diacritic: [tᵛ], [tᵝ], [t𐞄], [tᵖ].

For simple labialization, Ladefoged & Maddieson (1996) resurrected an old IPA symbol, [ ̫], which would be placed above a letter with a descender such as ɡ. However, their chief example is Shona sv and zv, which they transcribe /s̫/ and /z̫/ but which actually seem to be whistled sibilants, without necessarily being labialized. Another possibility is to use the IPA diacritic for rounding, distinguishing for example the labialization in English soon [s̹] and [sʷ] swoon. The open rounding of English /ʃ/ is also unvelarized.

== Assimilation ==
Labialization also refers to a specific type of assimilatory process where a given sound become labialized due to the influence of neighboring labial sounds. For example, /k/ may become /kʷ/ in the environment of /o/, or /a/ may become /o/ in the environment of /p/ or /kʷ/.

In the Northwest Caucasian languages as well as some Australian languages rounding has shifted from the vowels to the consonants, producing a wide range of labialized consonants and leaving in some cases only two phonemic vowels. This appears to have been the case in Ubykh and Eastern Arrernte, for example. The labial vowel sounds usually still remain, but only as allophones next to the now-labial consonant sounds.

== List of labialized consonants ==
Type		Phone	IPA	Languages
Stop	plain	protruded voiceless bilabial stop	[pʷ]	Chaha, Ibaloi, Paha, Eastern Arrernte, Soga
Stop	plain	protruded voiced bilabial stop	[bʷ]	Chaha, Ibaloi, Paha, Mayo, Yaqui
Stop	plain	lab^{zd} voiceless dental stop	[t̪ʷ]	Soga (marginal)
Stop	plain	lab^{zd} voiced dental stop	[d̪ʷ]	Eastern Arrernte, Soga
Stop	plain	lab^{zd} voiceless alveolar stop	[tʷ]	Archi, Abkhaz, Lao, Paha, Ubykh, Eastern Arrernte, Soga
Stop	plain	lab^{zd} voiced alveolar stop	[dʷ]	Archi, Abkhaz, Gua, Ubykh, Soga
Stop	plain	lab^{zd} voiceless retroflex stop	[ʈʷ]	Eastern Arrernte
Stop	plain	lab^{zd} voiceless alveolo-palatal stop	[c̟ʷ]	Eastern Arrernte
Stop	plain	lab^{zd} voiceless palatal stop	[cʷ]	Medumba
Stop	plain	lab^{zd} voiced palatal stop	[ɟʷ]	Medumba
Stop	plain	lab^{zd} voiceless velar stop	[kʷ]	Abaza, Abkhaz, Adyghe, Halkomelem, Kabardian, Taos, Chipewyan, Hadza, Gwichʼin, Tlingit, Akan, Nez Perce, Archi, Cantonese, Wariʼ, Chaha, Dahalo, Hausa, Igala, Igbo, Lao, Latin, Nahuatl, Nawat, Nuxalk, Okinawan, Ossetic, Paha, Portuguese, Thai, Tigrinya, Hiw, Ubykh, Bearlake Slavey, Breton, Gothic, Eastern Arrernte, Guarani
Stop	plain	lab^{zd} voiced velar stop	[ɡʷ]	Abaza, Abkhaz, Adyghe, Akan, Archi, Chaha, Dahalo, Hausa, Okinawan, Oowekyala, Ossetic, Hadza, Ibaloi, Igala, Igbo, Gwichʼin, Kabardian, Paha, Portuguese, Tigrinya, Ubykh, Breton, Yoruba, Gothic
Stop	plain	lab^{zd} voiceless uvular stop	[qʷ]	Abaza, Abkhaz, Adyghe, Kabardian, Ossetic, Paha, Tlingit, Nez Perce, Nuxalk, Ubykh
Stop	plain	lab^{zd} pharyngealized voiceless uvular stop	[qˤʷ]	Archi, Ubykh
Stop	plain	lab^{zd} voiced uvular stop	[ɢʷ]	Oowekyala, Kwak'wala, Tsakhur
Stop	plain	lab^{zd} glottal stop	[ʔʷ]	Adyghe, Kabardian, Lao, Tlingit
Stop	prenasalized	protruded voiceless bilabial stop	[ᵐpʷ]	Soga
Stop	prenasalized	protruded voiced bilabial stop	[ᵐbʷ]	Tamambo, Eastern Arrernte, North Teke, Soga (marginal)
Stop	prenasalized	lab^{zd} voiced dental stop	[ⁿd̪ʷ]	Eastern Arrernte, Soga
Stop	prenasalized	lab^{zd} voiceless alveolar stop	[ⁿtʷ]	Soga
Stop	prenasalized	lab^{zd} voiced alveolar stop	[ⁿdʷ]	Eastern Arrernte, Soga
Stop	prenasalized	lab^{zd} voiced alveolo-palatal stop	[ᶮɟ᫈ʷ]	Eastern Arrernte
Stop	prenasalized	lab^{zd} voiced retroflex stop	[ᶯɖʷ]	Eastern Arrernte
Stop	prenasalized	lab^{zd} voiceless palatal stop	[ᶮcʷ]	Medumba
Stop	prenasalized	lab^{zd} voiced palatal stop	[ᶮɟʷ]	Medumba
Stop	prenasalized	lab^{zd} voiceless velar stop	[ᵑkʷ]	North Teke, Soga
Stop	prenasalized	lab^{zd} voiced velar stop	[ᵑɡʷ]	Eastern Arrernte, North Teke, Soga
Stop	labial–velar	protruded voiceless labio-velar stop	[k͡pʷ]	Dorig, Mwotlap
Stop	labial–velar	protruded voiced labial–velar stop	[ᵑᵐɡ͡bʷ]	Nizaa, Volow
Affricate	sibilant	lab^{zd} voiceless alveolar affricate	[t͡sʷ]	Adyghe, Archi, Lezgian, Tsakhur
Affricate	sibilant	lab^{zd} voiced alveolar affricate	[d͡zʷ]	Adyghe, Dahalo, North Teke
Affricate	sibilant	lab^{zd} voiceless postalveolar affricate	[t͡ʃʷ]	Archi, Abaza, Adyghe, Paha, Aghul, German
Affricate	sibilant	lab^{zd} voiced postalveolar affricate	[d͡ʒʷ]	Abaza, Aghul, Tsakhur, German
Affricate	sibilant	lab^{zd} voiceless alveolo-palatal affricate	[t͡ɕʷ]	Abkhaz, Akan, Gua, Ubykh
Affricate	sibilant	lab^{zd} voiced alveolo-palatal affricate	[d͡ʑʷ]	Abkhaz, Akan, Ubykh
Affricate	non-sibilant	lab^{zd} voiceless velar affricate	[k͡xʷ]	Navajo
Affricate	non-sibilant	lab^{zd} voiceless uvular affricate	[q͡χʷ]	Kabardian, Lillooet
Affricate	lateral	lab^{zd} voiceless velar lateral affricate	[k͡𝼄ʷ]	Archi
Affricate	prenasalized	lab^{zd} voiceless postalveolar affricate	[ⁿtʃʷ]	North Teke
Affricate	prenasalized	lab^{zd} voiced postalveolar affricate	[ⁿdʒʷ]	North Teke
Fricative	sibilant	lab^{zd} voiceless alveolar sibilant	[sʷ]	Archi, Lao, Lezgian, Soga
Fricative	sibilant	lab^{zd} voiced alveolar sibilant	[zʷ]	Archi, Tsakhur, Lezgian, Soga
Fricative	sibilant	lab^{zd} voiceless postalveolar sibilant	[ʃʷ]	Archi, Abaza, Abkhaz, Adyghe, Paha, Aghul, Ubykh
Fricative	sibilant	lab^{zd} voiced postalveolar sibilant	[ʒʷ]	Archi, Abaza, Abkhaz, Adyghe, Aghul, Ubykh
Fricative	sibilant	lab^{zd} voiceless retroflex sibilant	[ʂʷ]	Bzhedug
Fricative	sibilant	lab^{zd} voiced retroflex sibilant	[ʐʷ]	Bzhedug
Fricative	sibilant	lab^{zd} voiceless alveolo-palatal sibilant	[ɕʷ]	Abkhaz, Ubykh
Fricative	sibilant	lab^{zd} voiced alveolo-palatal sibilant	[ʑʷ]	Abkhaz, Ubykh
Fricative	non-sibilant	protruded voiceless bilabial fricative	[ɸʷ]	Okinawan, Taruma
Fricative	non-sibilant	protruded voiced bilabial fricative	[βʷ]	Tamambo, Soga (contrasts with the labiodental)
Fricative	non-sibilant	lab^{zd} voiceless labiodental fricative	[fʷ]	Hadza, Chaha, Gua, Soga
Fricative	non-sibilant	lab^{zd} voiced labiodental fricative	[vʷ]	Soga (contrasts with the bilabial), Chichewa
Fricative	non-sibilant	lab^{zd} voiceless dental fricative	[θʷ]	Paha
Fricative	non-sibilant	lab^{zd} voiced dental fricative	[ðʷ]	Paha
Fricative	non-sibilant	lab^{zd} voiceless palatal fricative	[çʷ]	Akan
Fricative	non-sibilant	lab^{zd} voiceless velar fricative	[xʷ]	Abaza, Adyghe, Avestan, Chaha, Halkomelem, Kabardian, Oowekyala, Taos, Navajo, Nuxalk, Tigrinya, Lillooet, Tlingit
Fricative	non-sibilant	lab^{zd} voiced velar fricative	[ɣʷ]	Abaza, Navajo, Lillooet, Gwichʼin, possibly Proto-Indo-European
Fricative	non-sibilant	lab^{zd} voiceless uvular fricative	[χʷ]	Abkhaz, Adyghe, Archi, Halkomelem, Kabardian, Lillooet, Tlingit, Wariʼ, Chipewyan, Nuxalk, Oowekyala, Ossetic, Ubykh
Fricative	non-sibilant	lab^{zd} pharyngealized voiceless uvular fricative	[χˤʷ]	Abkhaz, Archi, Ubykh
Fricative	non-sibilant	lab^{zd} voiced uvular fricative	[ʁʷ]	Abkhaz, Adyghe, Chipewyan, Kabardian, Ubykh
Fricative	non-sibilant	lab^{zd} pharyngealized voiced uvular fricative	[ʁˤʷ]	Archi, Ubykh
Fricative	non-sibilant	lab^{zd} voiceless pharyngeal fricative	[ħʷ]	Abaza, Abkhaz
Fricative	non-sibilant	lab^{zd} voiced pharyngeal fricative	[ʕʷ]	Abaza, Lillooet
Fricative	pseudo-fricative	lab^{zd} voiceless glottal fricative	[hʷ]	Akan, Tlingit, Tsakhur, Gothic, Gua
Fricative	lateral	lab^{zd} voiceless alveolar lateral fricative	[ɬʷ]	Dahalo
Fricative	lateral	lab^{zd} voiceless velar lateral fricative	[𝼄ʷ]	Archi
Fricative	prenasalized	lab^{zd} voiced labiodental fricative	[ᶬvʷ]	Soga (marginal)
Fricative	prenasalized	lab^{zd} voiceless alveolar fricative	[ⁿsʷ]	Soga
Fricative	prenasalized	lab^{zd} voiced alveolar fricative	[ⁿzʷ]	Soga (marginal)
Nasal	plain	protruded bilabial nasal	[mʷ]	Adyghe, Chaha, Paha, Tamambo, Eastern Arrernte, Soga
Nasal	plain	lab^{zd} dental nasal	[n̪ʷ]	Eastern Arrernte, Soga
Nasal	plain	lab^{zd} alveolar nasal	[nʷ]	Eastern Arrernte, Soga
Nasal	plain	lab^{zd} retroflex nasal	[ɳʷ]	Eastern Arrernte
Nasal	plain	lab^{zd} alveolo-palatal nasal	[ɲ᫈ʷ]	Eastern Arrernte
Nasal	plain	lab^{zd} palatal nasal	[ɲʷ]	Akan, North Teke
Nasal	plain	lab^{zd} velar nasal	[ŋʷ]	Akan, Avestan, Lao, Hiw, Igala, Eastern Arrernte
Nasal	plain	protruded labial-velar nasal	[ŋ͡mʷ]	Dorig, Gua, Mwotlap
Nasal	pre-stopped	protruded bilabial nasal	[ᵖmʷ]	Eastern Arrernte
Nasal	pre-stopped	lab^{zd} dental nasal	[ᵗn̪ʷ]	Eastern Arrernte
Nasal	pre-stopped	lab^{zd} alveolar nasal	[ᵗnʷ]	Eastern Arrernte
Nasal	pre-stopped	lab^{zd} retroflex nasal	[𐞯ɳʷ]	Eastern Arrernte
Nasal	pre-stopped	lab^{zd} alveolo-palatal nasal	[ᶜɲ᫈ʷ]	Eastern Arrernte
Nasal	pre-stopped	lab^{zd} velar nasal	[ᵏŋʷ]	Eastern Arrernte
Vibrant	flap/tap	lab^{zd} alveolar tap	[ɾʷ]	Mishmi, Eastern Arrernte
Vibrant	flap/tap	lab^{zd} alveolar lateral flap	[ɺʷ]	Soga
Vibrant	trill	lab^{zd} alveolar trill	[rʷ]	Marshallese
Approximant	lateral	lab^{zd} dental lateral approximant	[l̪ʷ]	Eastern Arrernte
Approximant	lateral	lab^{zd} alveolar lateral approximant	[lʷ]	Lao, Eastern Arrernte, Gua
Approximant	lateral	lab^{zd} retroflex lateral approximant	[ɭʷ]	Eastern Arrernte
Approximant	lateral	lab^{zd} alveolo-palatal lateral approximant	[ʎ̟ʷ]	Eastern Arrernte
Approximant	median	lab^{zd} labiodental approximant	[ʋʷ]	Russian
Approximant	median	labialized palatal approximant	[ɥ], [jʷ]	Abkhaz, Akan, French, Mandarin, Paha, Eastern Arrernte
Approximant	median	compressed labio-velar approximant (voiced)	[ɰᵝ]	Japanese
Approximant	median	protruded labio-velar approximant (voiced)	[w], [ɰʷ]	widespread; in nearly every above-mentioned language, as well as e.g. Arabic, English, Korean, Vietnamese
Approximant	median	voiceless labio-velar approximant	[w̥]	certain dialects of English
Approximant	median	nasalized labio-velar approximant	[w̃]	Polish, Portuguese
Approximant	median	nasalized voiceless labio-velar approximant	[w̥̃]	Nemi
Approximant	median	lab^{zd} postalveolar approximant	[ɹ̠ʷ]	many dialects of English Eastern Arrernte
Approximant	median	lab^{zd} retroflex approximant	[ɻʷ]	many dialects of English Eastern Arrernte
Ejective		protruded bilabial ejective	[pʷʼ]	Adyghe
Ejective		lab^{zd} alveolar ejective	[tʷʼ]	Abkhaz, Adyghe, Ubykh
Ejective		lab^{zd} velar ejective	[kʷʼ]	Abaza, Abkhaz, Adyghe, Archi, Bearlake Slavey, Chipewyan, Halkomelem, Kabardian, Ossetic, Tlingit, Ubykh, Nuxalk
Ejective		lab^{zd} postalveolar ejective fricative	[ʃʷʼ]	Adyghe
Ejective		lab^{zd} uvular ejective	[qʷʼ]	Abaza, Abkhaz, Archi, Halkomelem, Hakuchi, Tlingit, Ubykh, Nuxalk
Ejective		lab^{zd} pharyngealized uvular ejective	[qˤʷʼ]	Archi, Ubykh
Ejective		lab^{zd} alveolar ejective affricate	[t͡sʷʼ]	Archi, Khwarshi
Ejective		lab^{zd} alveolar lateral ejective affricate	[t͡ɬʷʼ]	Khwarshi
Ejective		lab^{zd} postalveolar ejective affricate	[t͡ʃʷʼ]	Abaza, Archi, Khwarshi
Ejective		lab^{zd} retroflex ejective affricate	[ʈ͡ʂʷʼ]	allophonic in Adyghe
Ejective		lab^{zd} alveolo-palatal ejective affricate	[t͡ɕʷʼ]	Abkhaz, Ubykh
Ejective		lab^{zd} velar lateral ejective affricate	[k͡𝼄ʷʼ]	Archi
Ejective		lab^{zd} velar ejective fricative	[xʷʼ]	Tlingit
Ejective		lab^{zd} uvular ejective fricative	[χʷʼ]	Tlingit
Click		lab^{zd} tenuis dental click	[kǀʷ]	Xhosa (tenuis or ejective), Yeyi
Click		lab^{zd} tenuis alveolar click	[kǃʷ]	Xhosa (tenuis or ejective), Yeyi
Click		lab^{zd} tenuis alveolar click	[kǁʷ]	Xhosa (tenuis or ejective)
Click		lab^{zd} aspirated dental click	[kǀʰʷ]	Xhosa, Yeyi
Click		lab^{zd} aspirated alveolar click	[kǃʰʷ]	Xhosa, Yeyi
Click		lab^{zd} aspirated lateral click	[kǁʰʷ]	Xhosa, Yeyi
Click		lab^{zd} nasal dental click	[ŋǀʷ]	Xhosa, Yeyi
Click		lab^{zd} nasal alveolar click	[ŋǃʷ]	Xhosa, Yeyi
Click		lab^{zd} nasal lateral click	[ŋǁʷ]	Xhosa, Yeyi
Click		lab^{zd} voiced dental click	[ɡǀʷ]	Xhosa (voiced aspirated)
Click		lab^{zd} voiced alveolar click	[ɡǃʷ]	Xhosa (voiced aspirated), Yeyi
Click		lab^{zd} voiced lateral click	[ɡǁʷ]	Xhosa (voiced aspirated), Yeyi
Click		lab^{zd} glottalized nasal alveolar click	[ŋǃˀʷ]	Yeyi
Click		lab^{zd} breathy nasal dental click	[ŋǀʱʷ]	Xhosa
Click		lab^{zd} breathy nasal alveolar click	[ŋǃʱʷ]	Xhosa
Click		lab^{zd} breathy nasal lateral click	[ŋǁʱʷ]	Xhosa

Note that labialized palatal clicks are not attested in Yeyi and are not reconstructed for Proto-Kxʼa. Xhosa also has prenasalized tenuis/ejective and aspirated clicks, which also occur labialized (nkqw, nkxw, nchw, nqhw, nxhw).

== See also ==
- Labio-palatalization (◌ᶣ)

== Bibliography ==
- Crowley, Terry (1997). An Introduction to Historical Linguistics (3rd ed.). Oxford University Press.
- Ladefoged, Peter; Maddieson, Ian (1996). The Sounds of the World's Languages. Oxford: Blackwell. ISBN 0-631-19815-6.
- Ruhlen, Merritt (1976). A Guide to the Languages of the World. Stanford University Press.
- Yanushevskaya, Irena; Bunčić, Daniel (2015). "Russian". Journal of the International Phonetic Association. 45 (2): 221–228. doi:10.1017/S0025100314000395.

Place →	Labial					Coronal										Dorsal					Laryngeal			
Manner ↓	Bilabial		Labiodental		Linguolabial		Dental		Alveolar		Postalveolar		Retroflex		(Alveolo-)palatal		Velar		Uvular		Pharyngeal/epiglottal		Glottal	
Nasal	m̥	m	ɱ̊	ɱ		n̼	n̪̊	n̪	n̥	n	n̠̊	n̠	ɳ̊	ɳ	ɲ̊	ɲ	ŋ̊	ŋ	ɴ̥	ɴ				
Plosive	p	b	p̪	b̪	t̼	d̼	t̪	d̪	t	d			ʈ	ɖ	c	ɟ	k	ɡ	q	ɢ	ʡ		ʔ	
Sibilant affricate							t̪s̪	d̪z̪	ts	dz	t̠ʃ	d̠ʒ	tʂ	dʐ	tɕ	dʑ								
Non-sibilant affricate	pɸ	bβ	p̪f	b̪v			t̪θ	d̪ð	tɹ̝̊	dɹ̝	t̠ɹ̠̊˔	d̠ɹ̠˔			cç	ɟʝ	kx	ɡɣ	qχ	ɢʁ	ʡʜ	ʡʢ	ʔh	
Sibilant fricative							s̪	z̪	s	z	ʃ	ʒ	ʂ	ʐ	ɕ	ʑ								
Non-sibilant fricative	ɸ	β	f	v	θ̼	ð̼	θ	ð	θ̠	ð̠	ɹ̠̊˔	ɹ̠˔	ɻ̊˔	ɻ˔	ç	ʝ	x	ɣ	χ	ʁ	ħ	ʕ	h	ɦ
Approximant		β̞		ʋ				ð̞		ɹ		ɹ̠		ɻ		j		ɰ						˷
Tap/flap		ⱱ̟		ⱱ					ɾ̥	ɾ			ɽ̊	ɽ						ɢ̆		ʡ̆		
Trill	ʙ̥	ʙ							r̥	r		r̠	ɽ̊r̥	ɽr					ʀ̥	ʀ	ʜ	ʢ		
Lateral affricate									tɬ	dɮ			tꞎ	d𝼅	c𝼆	ɟʎ̝	k𝼄	ɡʟ̝						
Lateral fricative							ɬ̪		ɬ	ɮ			ꞎ	𝼅	𝼆	ʎ̝	𝼄	ʟ̝						
Lateral approximant								l̪	l̥	l		l̠	ɭ̊	ɭ	ʎ̥	ʎ	ʟ̥	ʟ		ʟ̠				
Lateral tap/flap									ɺ̥	ɺ			𝼈̊	𝼈		ʎ̆		ʟ̆						

		BL	LD	D	A	PA	RF	P	V	U
Implosive	Voiced	ɓ			ɗ		ᶑ	ʄ	ɠ	ʛ
Implosive	Voiceless	ɓ̥			ɗ̥		ᶑ̊	ʄ̊	ɠ̊	ʛ̥
Ejective	Stop	pʼ			tʼ		ʈʼ	cʼ	kʼ	qʼ
Ejective	Affricate		p̪fʼ	tθʼ	tsʼ	tʃʼ	tʂʼ	tɕʼ	kxʼ	qχʼ
Ejective	Fricative	ɸʼ	fʼ	θʼ	sʼ	ʃʼ	ʂʼ	ɕʼ	xʼ	χʼ
Ejective	Lateral affricate				tɬʼ			c𝼆ʼ	k𝼄ʼ	q𝼄ʼ
Ejective	Lateral fricative				ɬʼ					
Click (top: velar; bottom: uvular)	Tenuis	kʘ qʘ		kǀ qǀ	kǃ qǃ		k𝼊 q𝼊	kǂ qǂ		
Click (top: velar; bottom: uvular)	Voiced	ɡʘ ɢʘ		ɡǀ ɢǀ	ɡǃ ɢǃ		ɡ𝼊 ɢ𝼊	ɡǂ ɢǂ		
Click (top: velar; bottom: uvular)	Nasal	ŋʘ ɴʘ		ŋǀ ɴǀ	ŋǃ ɴǃ		ŋ𝼊 ɴ𝼊	ŋǂ ɴǂ	ʞ	
Click (top: velar; bottom: uvular)	Tenuis lateral				kǁ qǁ					
Click (top: velar; bottom: uvular)	Voiced lateral				ɡǁ ɢǁ					
Click (top: velar; bottom: uvular)	Nasal lateral				ŋǁ ɴǁ					
