= Gwere language =

Language

Gwere
- (O)lugwere
- Native to: Uganda
- Region: Eastern Region
- Ethnicity: Bagwere
- Native speakers: 410,000 (2002 census)
- Language family: Niger–Congo?: Atlantic–Congo; Volta-Congo; Benue–Congo; Bantoid; Southern Bantoid; Bantu; Northeast Bantu; Great Lakes Bantu; West Nyanza; North Nyanza; Gwere

Language codes
- ISO 639-3: gwr
- Glottolog: gwer1238
- Guthrie code: JE.17

Gwere, or Lugwere, is the language spoken by the Gwere people (Bagwere), a Bantu people found in the eastern part of Uganda. It has a close dialectical resemblance to Soga and Ganda, which neighbour the Gwere.

== Phonology ==
=== Consonants ===
Gwere has 20 consonant phonemes.

	Bilabial	Labio-dental	Alveolar	Palatal	Velar
Plosive/ Affricate	p b		t d	t͡ʃ d͡ʒ	k g
Fricative	β	f v	s z		
Nasal	m		n	ɲ	ŋ
Approximant	w		l	j	

=== Vowels ===
Gwere has ten vowel phonemes, 5 short and 5 long.

	Front	Back
Close	i iː	u uː
Mid	e eː	o oː
Open		ɑ ɑː

== Orthography and alphabet ==
The Gwere alphabet has 31 letters.

- a - a - [ɑ]
- aa - aa - [ɑː]
- b - ba - [β]
- bb - bba - [b]
- c - ca - [c]
- d - da - [d]
- e - e - [e]
- ee - ee - [eː]
- f - fa - [f]
- g - ga - [g]
- i - i - [i]
- ii - ii - [iː]
- j - ja - [ɟ]
- k - ka - [k]
- l - la - [l]
- m - ma - [m]
- n - na - [n]
- ny - nya - [ɲ]
- ŋ - ŋa - [ŋ]
- o - o - [o]
- oo - oo - [oː]
- p - pa - [p]
- r - ra - [r]
- s - sa - [s]
- t - ta - [t]
- u - u - [u]
- uu - uu - [uː]
- v - va - [v]
- w - wa - [w]
- y - ya - [j]
- z - za - [z]

== Bibliography ==
- Akinlabi, Akinbiyi (1995). Theoretical approaches to African linguistics. Africa World Press. ISBN 0-86543-463-8.
- Nzogi, Richard Kijjali (2006-06-15). Lugwere Phonology Statement (PDF). Dallas, TX: SIL International. Archived (PDF) from the original on 2024-01-16.
- Nzogi, Richard; Diprose, Martin (2012a). "The Lugwere Alphabet". Lugwere Dictionary. Entebbe, Uganda: Lunyole Language Association.
