= Gua language =

Guang language spoken in Ghana

Gua
- Native to: Ghana
- Native speakers: 60,000 (2003)
- Language family: Niger–Congo?: Atlantic–Congo; Kwa; Potou–Tano; Tano; Guang; South Guang; Gua
- Dialects: Anu (Anum); Boso

Language codes
- ISO 639-3: gwx
- Glottolog: guaa1238

Gua is a Guang language spoken in many parts of Ghana including the Gonja, in the northern Savannah Region, the Nchumurus in the Northern, Oti and Bono East Regions, the people of Larteh, Okere, Anum and Boso, the people of Winneba, Senya Beraku, Buem, Achode, Nkonya, Krachi, Santrokofi, Adele and Wuripong all in the Oti Region. The name of the language comes from the word 'to run' in Gua.

== Phonology ==
=== Vowels ===
Gua has nine phonemic oral vowels and seven phonemic nasal vowels. There are four allophonic vowels produced by regressive ATR harmony.

Gua vowels
	Front				Central				Back			
	oral		nasal		oral		nasal		oral		nasal	
	-ATR	+ATR	-ATR	+ATR	-ATR	+ATR	-ATR	+ATR	-ATR	+ATR	-ATR	+ATR
Close	/ɪ/	/i/	/ɪ̃/	/ĩ/					/ʊ/	/u/	/ʊ̃/	/ũ/
Mid	/ɛ/	/e/	/ɛ̃/	/ẽ/ (Note: /ẽ/, /õ/, /ɜ/, and /ɜ̃/ are +ATR allophonic variants of /ɛ̃/, /ɔ̃/, /a/, and /ã/ respectfully.)					/ɔ/	/o/	/ɔ̃/	/õ/
Open					/a/	/ɜ/	/ã/	/ɜ̃/				

=== Consonants ===
Gua consonants
		Labial		Alveolar		Palatal		Velar		Labial-velar		Glottal	
		plain	labial	plain	labial	plain	labial	plain	labial	plain	labial	plain	labial
Nasal		m		n		ɲ		ŋ	ŋʷ	ŋm	ŋmʷ		
Plosive/Affricate	Voiceless	p		t		tɕ	tɕʷ	k	kʷ	kp			
Plosive/Affricate	Voiced	b	bʷ	d	dʷ	dʑ		g	gʷ	gb			
Fricative		f	fʷ	s								h	hʷ
Approximant				l	lʷ	j					w		
Trill				r									

=== Tone ===
Gua has two basic tones, high and low.

Downstep occurs in High-Low-High tone sequences.

== Grammar ==
=== Pronouns ===
The personal pronouns in Gua are as follows:

	singular				plural		
	1st	2nd	3rd animate	3rd inanimate	1st	2nd	3rd
subject	mí, mɪ́	wú, wʊ́	ǽ, á	í, ɪ́	ɛ̀ní, ɛ̀nɪ́	ɛ́ní, ɛ́nɪ́ (Note: Pronounced with downstep)	ɛ̀mú, ɛ̀mʊ́
direct and indirect object	mɪ́	wʊ́	mʊ̀ or nɛ́	mʊ̀	ɛ̀nɪ́	ɛ́nɪ́	ɛ̀mʊ̀
emphatic	mɪ́	wʊ́	mʊ̀	mʊ̀	ɛ̀nɪ́	ɛ́nɪ́	ɛ̀mʊ̀
possessive	mí, mɪ́	wú, wʊ́	mò, mʊ̀	mò, mʊ̀	ɛ̀ní, ɛ̀nɪ́	ɛ́ní, ɛ́nɪ́	ɛ̀mù, ɛ̀mʊ̀

Subject and possessive forms are subject to vowel harmony rules. There is no gender distinction or formal/informal 2nd person distinction.

=== Word order ===
Basici word word in Gua is as follows:

sentence	→	adverb	+	noun phrase	+	verb phrase	+	sentence
