= Charles Kamurasi =

Ugandan cultural leader

Musuuga Charles Kayondo Kamurasi
- Predecessor: Keith Kagoro
- Born: Charles Keith Kayondo Kamurasi Akiiki; 1946 (age 79–80); Uganda
- Issue: Omubiito Patrick Mpuuga; Omubiito Solomon Nyaika
- Father: Rukidi III
- Mother: Leah Ngaju Gaju
- Occupation: Cultural leader

Omujwera Musuuga (Omusuuga or Musuuga) Charles Keith Kayondo Kamurasi Akiiki (born 1946) is a Ugandan cultural leader and the traditional head of the Babiito royal clan, the ruling dynasty of the Tooro Kingdom in western Uganda.

== Early life and royal background ==
Kamurasi was born to Rukirabasaija Sir George David Matthew Kamurasi Rukidi III, who served as the 11th Omukama of Tooro from 1928 to 1965, and Omugo Leah Ngaju Gaju, who was a royal descendant belonging to the Babiito lineage of the neighboring Bunyoro-Kitara Kingdom and a niece of Omukama Sir Tito Winyi IV.

== Cultural role ==
Kamurasi became a Musuuga, the head of the Babiito royal clan, a traditional appointment by the Omukama. He inherited the office from his uncle, Keith Kagoro, and was appointed by the late Omukama Patrick Kaboyo in 1993.

He was involved in Omukama Oyo's life from childhood, and he was among the people entrusted with responsibilities concerning the young king after Oyo became Omukama at the age of three. He participated in the ceremonies surrounding Oyo's enthronement in 1995. Kamurasi also represents the Babiito royal clan in matters concerning the monarchy. For instance, in 2013 he was summoned by the Tooro Kingdom Parliament as a head of the Royal Clan, regarding matters surrounding Princess Ruth Komuntale's marriage.

== Role following King Oyo's death ==
King Oyo in conversation with Omusuuga Charles Kamurasi during the 29th empango celebration

After King Oyo's death on 27 August 2026, Kamurasi as the Omusuuga led the funeral and succession process through chairing meetings concerning the traditional protocols surrounding the King's funeral and succession. He formed a 21-member committee composed of Babiito clan elders to oversee the identifying a successor.

On 4 September 2026, Kamurasi presided over a closed‑door session of the Royal Succession Committee at Fort Motel in Fort Portal. During the meeting, the committee elected Prince Edward Rukidi Kijjanangoma, a cousin of King Oyo and a member of the traditional line of succession, as the new monarch of the Tooro Kingdom. The decision was taken in the context of the presentation of what was described as the last will of the late King Oyo.

== Royal clan and institutional divisions ==
Kamurasi's determination to override King Oyo's purported will sparked disputes. On 10 September 2026, his sons Prince Patrick Mpuuga and Prince Solomon Nyaika broke ranks, alleging external manipulation and affirming loyalty to the late king's reported choice of a younger heir. Elders of the Tooro Babiito clan simultaneously rejected advice from the Ugandan Attorney General Sam Mayanja, ruling out Kamurasi's sons on grounds that Tooro custom bars a monarch with a living father. Despite opposition from Queen Mother Best Kemigisa, Princess Ruth Komuntale, and Princess Elizabeth Bagaaya, Kamurasi pledged on 14 September that the clan would continue supporting the Queen Mother while maintaining its institutional stance.

On 12 September, Kamurasi oversaw King Oyo's burial at the Karambi Royal Tombs. On 15 September, he convened the Tooro Supreme Council (Orukurato) at Muchwa Headquarters in Fort Portal. Amid reports of missing palace keys, he declared Crown Prince Edward Rukidi Nyabongo (also known as Prince Edward Kijanangoma or George Desmond Kamurasi) the 13th Omukama of Tooro, authorizing the Babiito clan to begin coronation preparations.

== See also ==
- Rukidi III of Tooro
- Olimi III of Tooro
- Nyabongo I of Tooro
- Biito clan
