= Margaret Annet Muhanga Mugisa =

Ugandan politician

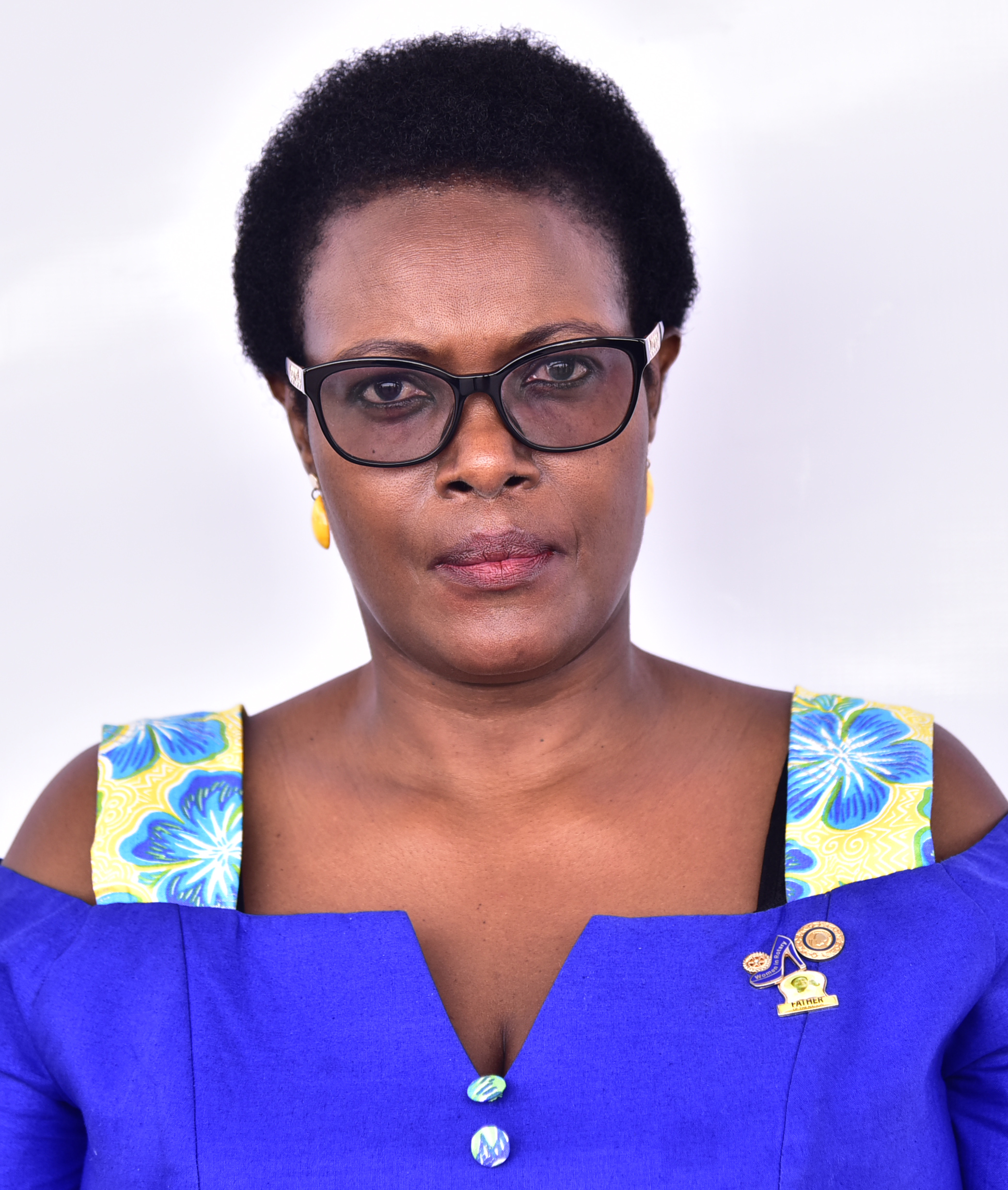
- Mugisa in 2021
- Born: 4 June 1967 (age 59)
- Occupations: politician and legislator
- Known for: politics
- Political party: National Resistance Movement
- Spouse: Michael Mugisha

Mugisa Muhanga Margaret (born 4 June 1967), also known as Margaret Muhanga, is a Ugandan politician. She is also the State Minister for Primary Healthcare appointed by Yoweri Kaguta Museveni in 2021, Rotarian, journalist, development consultant and a businesswoman. Margaret was the Woman Member of Parliament of Kabarole District in the eighth and the Burahya County MP Kabarole District in the tenth parliament of Uganda. She later joined as the Woman Member of Parliament of Kabarole District of North Division Fort Portal City in the eleventh Parliament of Uganda under the National Resistance Movement political party. She is a Ugandan politician and member of parliament for North Division in Fort Portal City in the eleventh parliament of Uganda. She is affiliated to the National Resistance Movement. She also served as the Woman representative for Kabarole District in the tenth parliament of Uganda

== Personal life and education ==
She was born to Constance Muhangazima Adyeri. She is married to Michael Mugisa, the former District Chairman Kabarole and the executive director of National Forestry Authority with many children from whom she is a guardian to and many of them are orphans. Muhanga's husband replaced Damiano Akankwasa at the National Forestry Authority, after Akankwasa was convicted for abuse of office by causing financial loss of 2.8 billion Uganda shillings.

Margaret is married to Michael Mugisha and they have children together. She supported schools dropouts and also supported church construction She is the elder sister to Andrew Mwenda, a Ugandan journalist. She is also a sister to UPDF’s Maj. Gen Kayanja Muhanga and Maj. Henry Baguma, a historical Director under the Internal Security Organisation (ISO). Muhanga's hobbies are cooking and cleaning her house.

Margaret has a Master's degree and she went to Nyakasura School.

== Career ==
Margaret worked for New Vision in the 1990s covering parliamentary news. She was the Member of parliament for Burahya in Kabarole District in the tenth parliament of Uganda. She won the 2021 national elections to become the member of parliament for North Division in Fort Portal City. Margaret supported the lifting of the term limit bill in the tenth parliament. Margaret sat on the parliamentary Committee on Commissions, State Authorities & State Enterprises.

She was employed at the New Vision in the early 1990s, covering parliament. Margaret started the Uganda Parliamentary Journalists Association with Henry Ochieng who was the chairman and she was his vice chair. She is the CEO of Diamond Empowerment Limited and Fort Fun City Fort Portal. She served as an administrator at the office of the president.

She was the former woman member of Parliament for Kabarole District 2006-2011 and later became the Burahya County MP Kabarole District in the 10th parliament. She joined politics because of her love for helping people, however she has no interest in politics.

She was later succeeded by Pamela Annet Kirungi during the 2026 general elections.

=== Controversy ===
In 2021, she told the former Speaker of Parliament, Rebecca Kadaga that she would go back to Busoga and grow sugarcanes. This was after Kadaga disrespected the National Resistance Movement (NRM) party decision of fronting the late Jacob Oulanyah for parliamentary speakership even after making a tacit agreement in 2016 when the latter chose not to contest against her. She has been conspired to defraud UBC of its land.

She among other people led a successful strike at Parliament and pulled out all the journalists from all media houses in 1999 and they told journalists not to go back for one week because they wanted an office and Parliament wasn’t giving it to them.

== See also ==
1. List of members of the eleventh Parliament of Uganda
2. Irene Linda Mugisha
3. Parliament of Uganda
4. National Resistance Movement
5. Pamela Annet Kirungi
