= Rukidi III of Tooro =

King of Tooro from 1928 to 1965

Rukidi III
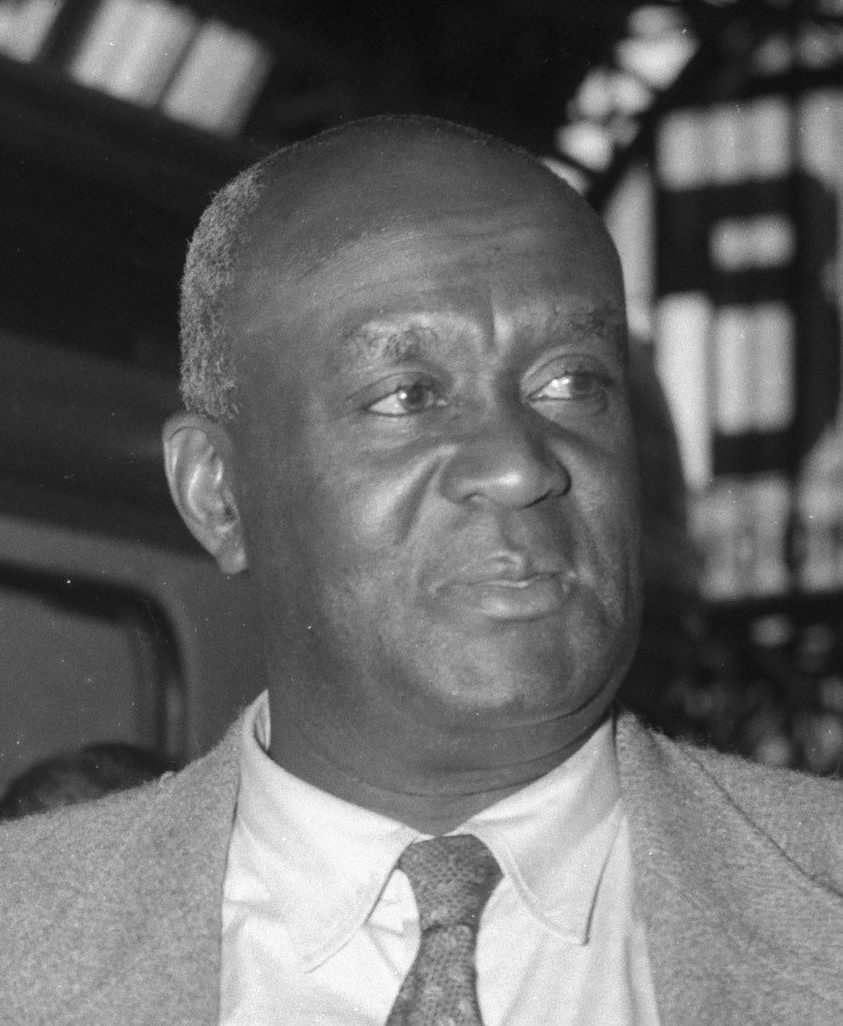
- Rukidi in 1959

Omukama of Tooro
- Reign: 31 December 1928 – 21 December 1965
- Coronation: 29 January 1929, St John's Cathedral, Kabarole
- Predecessor: Kyebambe III
- Successor: Olimi III
- Born: 6 March 1904; Karuziika Royal Palace, Nyamunyaka Hill, Fort Portal
- Died: 21 December 1965 (aged 61); Royal Palace, Kabarole
- Burial: Karambi royal tombs (Ha'gasani)
- Consort: Queen Kezia
- Issue Detail: Olimi III; Prince Charles; Princess Elizabeth
Names
- George Mathew David Kamurasi Rukidi
- House: Biito-boyo
- Father: Kyebambe III
- Mother: Omugo Adyeeri Damali Tibaitwa
- Religion: Anglican

Rukidi III (George Mathew David Kamurasi Rukidi; 6 March 1904 – 21 December 1965) was Omukama (King) of the Tooro Kingdom (one of the four traditional kingdoms located within the borders of what is today Uganda) from 1928 until 1965. He was the 11th Omukama of Tooro.

== Claim to the throne ==
He was son of the tenth Omukama of Toro, Kyebambe III, who reigned from 1928 until 1965. His mother was Damali Tibaitwa. He was born at the Royal Palace at Kabarole, on 6 March 1904. He attended Budo Primary School, Nyakasura School in Fort Portal, Mengo Senior School, King's College Budo and Columbia University. He served as inspector in the Uganda Police Force in 1926. He ascended to the throne upon the death of his father, on 31 December 1928. He was crowned at St John's Cathedral, Kabarole, on 29 January 1929. As his eldest sister, Princess (Omubiitokati) Ruth Komuntale was crowned alongside Rukidi III as Batebe, a role in which she would act as the king's closest advisor.

== His reign ==
Omukama Kamurasi Rukidi III attended the coronation of Queen Elizabeth II at Westminster Abbey in London in 1953. He was made an Honorary Lieutenant in the 4th Battalion (based in Uganda), of the King's African Rifles, from 1928 until 1930. He founded and was the Sovereign Grand Master of the Order of the Lion, Crown and Shield of Toro. He was knighted on 2 June 1962 and received several medals and commendations from the British government, Ugandan government and from the Government of Buganda.

He died at the Royal Palace, Kabarole, on 21 December 1965. He was buried at Karambi Royal Tombs, (Ha'gasani).

== Family ==
Omukama Rukidi III married multiple wives according to tradition;

- Omugo Kezia Bonabana Byanjeru of the Abagabu clan who was the principal wife (Omugo w'ekitebe)
- Omugo Evelyn Kahinju of the Ababoopi clan who resided at Harukoto and was known as Omugo wa Harukoto
- Omugo Theresa
- Omugo Theodora Bacwa Abwooli who resided at Kabahango Palace and was known as Omugo wa Kabahango
- Omugo Akiiki Zaulia Katukura of the Abaitira clan from Busongora county who resides at the Bulera Palace
- Omugo Leah Ngaju, a Princess from Bunyoro, she was a daughter of Omubiito Yoweri Komwiswa, a grandchild of Omukama Kabalega of Bunyoro
- Omugo Faith Nyinabarongo Adyeeri who resided at Rwengaju Palace known as Omugo wa Rwengaju

=== Offspring ===
- Prince (Omubiito) Solomon William Okwiri born 30 October 1928 whose mother was Omugo Kezia Bonabana Byanjeru.
- Prince (Omubiito) Stephen Edgar Paul Karamagi born 1934 whose mother was Omugo Evelyn Kahinju. He attended Nyakasura School, Kabarole, King's College, Budo, Sidney Sussex College, Cambridge (LLB), and Columbia University, New York, US. He worked as a diplomat, for the Uganda Government in the 1960s. In 1963, he married Margaret Semugeshi, daughter of Chief Semugeshi, of Bufundu, in Butare, Rwanda. He had issue:
  - a) Prince (Omubiito) George Kamurasi Karamagi. b. at Cairo, Egypt, 1967 (s/oMargaret). m. Monica Ntiru. He has issue, triplets:
    - i) Rusetsa Nyangoma Karamagi. b. at Houston, Texas, USA, 2006.
    - ii) Ruyonga Katto Karamagi. b. at Houston, Texas, USA, 2006.
    - iii) Rukidi Kizza Karamagi. b. at Houston, Texas, USA, 2006.
  - b) Prince (Omubiito) Stephen Oyo Karamagi. b. at Mengo, 1970 (s/o Margaret). Has one son Olimi Karamagi
  - a) Princess (Omubiitokati) Roslyn Kabaramagi (d/o a different mother). She d. at Nairobi, Kenya, 1995, having had issue, a daughter Daphne Kirungi.
  - b) Princess (Omubiitokati) Evelyn Kahinju. b. in Essex, 1963 (d/o Margaret). m. … Kamau. She has issue, two sons.
  - c) Princess (Omubiitokati) Jennifer Nadia Komukyeya. b. at Cairo, Egypt, 1966 (d/oMargaret). m. … Rusita. She has issue, two daughters.
- Prince (Omubiito) Ruyonga born 27 March 1935 whose mother was Omugo Theodora Bacwa Abwooli
- Prince (Omubiito) Emanuel Erasmus Ishagara whose mother was Omugo Theodora Bacwa Abwooli he attended St. Peter's School and St. Luke's College, Virika. On 21 December 1966, he married, at St. Paul's Cathedral, Namirembe, Catherine Rosette, daughter of Erieza Sebabi, sometime Ssabalamuzi (Chief Justice) of Buganda, by his wife, Mary Nanfuka. Father of four sons and three daughters:
  - (a) Prince (Omubiito) David Kamurasi Ishagara. He was born at Nsambya Hospital, Kampala, on 11 February 1967. He attended Namilyango College and ITT Technical Institute, London (BSc). In October 1997, he married Irene N. Kasozi-Batende, at Camden, London. Together, they have a daughter; Princess (Omubiitokati) Joanita Kakyo Komubaizi
  - (b) Prince (Omubiito) Solomon Michael Okwiri Adyeri Ishagara. He was born at Mulago Hospital, Kampala, on 11 June 1973. He was educated at Busoga College Mwiri, Baruch College and TCI College of Technology, New York City
  - (c) Prince (Omubiito) Emmanuel Ishagara Jr . He was born at Mulago Hospital on 9 September 1977. He attended Busoga College, Mwiri, Baruch College, New York and Park University, Kansas City, Missouri, US (BSc)
  - (d) Princess (Omubiitokati) Sandra Ishagara. She was born at Nsambya Hospital, Kampala, on 29 December 1969. She attended King's College, Buddo, South Thames College (BA Fin.). She is the mother of a son and a daughter: (i) Josh Kasozi, born on 27 April 2004 and (ii) Chauntel Grace S. Ishagara Kendall, born on 18 May 1996
  - (e) Prince (Omubiito) Mutalesa Robert Ishagara, Born in 1958 to 2016, Member of the UPDF and Internal Security Organization. Farther of Prince (Omubiito) Kamurasi Glane
  - (f) Princess (Omubiitokati) Mpanja
  - (g) Princess (Omubiitokati) Komukyeya.
- Rukirabasaija Patrick David Matthew Kaboyo Olimi III, Omukama of Tooro whose mother was Omugo Kezia Bonabana Byanjeru. He was 12th Omukama of Toro.
  - (a) Princess (Omubiitokati) Ruth Nsemere Komuntale later Batebe (Princess royal) to her brother.
  - (b) Rukirabasaija Omukama Oyo Nyimba Kabamba Iguru Rukidi IV, Omukama of Tooro (1992–2026), he was 13th Omukama of Toro.
  - (c) Princess (Omubiitokati) Celia Komukyeka (died 1997).
- Prince (Omubiito) Christopher Paul Kijanangoma.His mother was Omugo Theresa.He married Yusta Asiimwe and had 3 sons and a daughter;
  - (a) Prince (Omubiito) Charles Happy Kijanangoma, born in 1956. Killed by an associate of the Prime Minister (Omuhikirwa) of Toro and Queen Mother Best Kemigisa implicated, in a public bar in Fort Portal, on 25 March 1999.
  - (b) prince (Omubiito) David Kijanangoma.
  - (c) Edward Rukidi Nyabongo I, Omukama of Toro, born 1970. He is 14th Omukama of Toro.
  - (d) Princess (Omubiitokati) Grace Kijanangoma later Batebe (princess royal) to her brother.
- Prince (Omubiito) James Desmond Mugenyi Muzimanuki born in 1947 his mother was Omugo Kezia Bonabana Byanjeru.he wasCommissioned 2nd Lieutenant in the Uganda Army. Dismissed from the army by Idi Amin in 1972. He became a Regent for his nephew, Oyo Nyimba Kabamba Iguru Rukidi IV, on 26 August 1994. He married and had two sons and one daughter
  - (a) Prince (Omubiito) George Desmond Kamurasi Mugenyi
  - (b) Princess (Omubiitokati) Damali Komukyeya Mugenyi
  - (c) Prince Mugenyi
- Prince (Omubiito) Lt. Col. Ronald Rubale. His mother was Omugo Theodora Bacwa. Lt. Col. Ronald Rubale is a Ugandan military officer in the Uganda People's Defence Forces (UPDF) and a government coordinator for microfinance under Operation Wealth Creation within the Ministry of Finance and Economic Development.
- Prince (Omubiito) Kenneth Muhangura. His mother was Omugo Leah Ngaju
- Prince (Omubiito) Gilbert Mujogya. His mother was Omugo Leah Ngaju
- Prince (Omubiito) Charles Kamurasi Akiiki. His mother was Omugo Leah Ngaju. He serves as the omusuuga (the head of the royal clan, the Babiito). Married the younger sister of Queen Best Kemigisa. They have three sons
  - (a)Prince Patrick Mpuuga,
  - (b)Prince Solomon Nyaika, and
  - (c)Prince Komwiswa Yoweri
- Princess (Omubiitokati) Gertrude Kabege Katongole Atwooki whose mother was Omugo Evelyn Kahinju
- Princess (Omubiitokati) Elizabeth Christobel Edith Bagaaya Nyabongo Akiiki born 9 February 1936 whose mother was Omugo Kezia Bonabana Byanjeru. She was the first East African woman to be admitted to the English Bar. She was installed as Batebe (Princess Royal) to her brother Patrick David Matthew Koboyo Olimi III, on 2 March 1966. She served as Uganda' Ambassador-at-Large between 1971 and 1973, Uganda's Ambassador to Egypt and Ethiopia from 1973 until 1974, and Uganda's Permanent Representative at the United Nations in New York in 1974. She was Uganda's Minister for Foreign Affairs between February 1974 and November 1974. She served as Spokesperson for the National Resistance Movement (NRM) in Europe, between 1980 and 1986. She was Uganda's Ambassador to the United States of America from 1986 until 1988, and to Germany and the Vatican between 2006 and 2008. She serves as Uganda's High Commissioner to Nigeria since 2008.
- Princess (Omubiitokati) Mabel Komuntale, whose mother was Omugo Kezia Bonabana Byanjeru, was a member of the Regency Council to King Oyo Rukidi IV from 1995 until 1997
- Princess (Omubiitokati) Rachel Kabasweka Abwooli whose mother was Omugo Kezia Bonabana Byanjeru
- Princess (Omubiitokati) Rosemary Kijumba Balinda Abwooli Her mother was Omugo Theodora Bacwa
- Princess (Omubiitokati) Adyeeri Damali Noel Komukyeya Kankya died 2021, whose mother was Omugo Kezia Bonabana Byanjeru. She married Amooti Patrick Kankya and had five children;
  - Florence Kankya-Rutaroh
  - Ruth Kabonero
  - Daisy Kezia Kankya
  - Lydia Kankya
  - Patrick Kankya Jnr.
- Princess (Omubiitokati) Kijumba Kabaramagi whose mother was Omugo Kezia Bonabana Byanjeru
- Princess (Omubiitokati) Kezia Kanyomozi whose mother was Omugo Kezia Bonabana Byanjeru
- Princess (Omubiitokati) Elizabeth Mpanja Ndahendekire whose mother was Omugo Kezia Bonabana Byanjeru. She married Lt col. William Ndahendekire 18 December 1965
- Princess(Omubitokati) Margret Juliana Komubaizi Abwooli (Mukajoyi). She served as assistant Batebe (Princess Royal) in the reign of her nephew Rukidi IV
- Princess (Omubiitokati) Agnes Nkwenge Bunyenyezi whose mother was Omugo Evelyn Kahinju.
- Prince (Omubiito) Apollo Loyd Mugema whose mother was Omugo Evelyn Kahinju.
- Prince (Omubiito) Gerald Philip Manyindo whose mother was Omugo Evelyn Kahinju. He married Catherine Kabasomi Byabusa on 1 May 1975. He is the father of Prince (Omubiito) Edward Freeman Kim, Princess (Omubiitokati) Juliana Kanyomozi and Princess (Omubiitokati) Laura Kahunde
- Prince (Omubiito) Bazil Mirembe whose mother was Omugo Evelyn Kahinju
- Princess (Omubiitokati) Lucy Makulima Matama
- Prince (Omubiito) Roden Isingoma whose mother was Omugo Nyinabarongo.
- Prince (Omubiito) Kato Franklin Jocelyn Rukidi Abbooki whose mother was Omugo Nyinabarongo. He along with sisters Princess Lucy Makulima Matama and Princess Elizabeth Mpanja Ndahendekire were appointed as administrators to their late father's estate in 1989 but when his sisters predeceased him they were replaced by his brother Prince Gilbert Mujogya.

== See also ==
- Omukama of Tooro
- Olimi III of Tooro
- Olimi I of Tooro
- Olimi II of Tooro

Preceded by Kasagama Kyebambe III	Omukama of Tooro; 1928–1965	Succeeded by Kaboyo Olimi III
