= Olimi III of Tooro =

King of Tooro from 1965 to 1995

Olimi III

Omukama of Tooro
- Reign: 21 December 1965 – 26 August 1995
- Coronation: 2 March 1966; St John's Cathedral, Kabarole
- Predecessor: Rukidi III
- Successor: Rukidi IV
- Born: 9 September 1945; Royal Palace, Fort Portal, Kabarole
- Died: 26 August 1995 (aged 49); Royal Palace, Fort Portal, Kabarole
- Burial: Karambi royal tombs (Ha'gasani)
- Spouse: Omugo Best Kemigisa Akiiki
- Issue: Rukidi IV; Princess Ruth Nsemere Komuntale; Princess Celia Komukyeya
Names
- Patrick David Matthew Rwamuhokya Kaboyo Olimi
- House: Biito-boyo
- Father: Rukidi III
- Mother: Kezia
- Religion: Anglican

Olimi III (Patrick David Matthew Rwamuhokya Kaboyo Olimi; 9 September 1945 – 26 August 1995) was the 12th Omukama of the Tooro Kingdom and reigned from 1965 until his death in 1995.

== Early life ==
He was the son of Rukirabasaija Sir George David Matthew Kamurasi Rukidi III, Omukama of Tooro, who reigned from 1928 until 1965. His mother was Lady Byanjeru Kezia Bonabana. He was born at the Royal Palace at Kabarole, on 9 September 1945 with Princess Elizabeth Bagaya as his eldest sister. He attended Budo Primary School, Nyakasura School in Fort Portal, Sherborne School, Dorset, and Makerere University, Kampala. He ascended to the throne upon the death of his father, on 21 December 1965. He was crowned at St John's Cathedral, Kabarole, on 2 March 1966.

== Reign ==
Kaboyo reigned only briefly before the monarchies of Uganda were abolished by the Obote government on 8 September 1967. He spent the following two decades in exile, living in neighboring Kenya.

He returned to Uganda and entered the Ugandan Foreign Service in 1986. He served as a Minister-Counselor at the Ugandan High Commission in Dar-es-Salaam, Tanzania, between 1987 and 1990. He was Uganda's Ambassador to Cuba from 1990 until 1993.

On 24 July 1993 he was proclaimed, upon the restoration of the Ugandan kingdoms by the government of Yoweri Kaguta Museveni.

Olimi III died suddenly of a heart attack on 26 August 1995 at his palace in Fort Portal, aged 49. He was succeeded by his then three year old son, Rukirabasaija Oyo Nyimba Kabamba Iguru Rukidi IV, mostly known as King Oyo.

== Family ==
On 10 January 1987, he married Best Kemigisa, daughter of Prince (Omubiito) Mujungu, of the Batuku of Rwebisengo, Bundibugyo District, (Ntoroko District since 2017). She was born in 1967, educated at Kahinju Primary School, Mpanga Senior Secondary School and Kyebambe Girls School, all in the Tooro Kingdom.

=== Issue ===
Omukama Kaboyo Olimi III fathered three children; one son and two daughters.

Name	Birth	Death	Notes
Rukirabasaija Oyo Nyimba Kabamba Iguru Rukidi IV	16 April 1992	27 August 2026	13th Omukama of Tooro
Princess (Omubiitokati) Ruth Nsemere Komuntale	1989		She was educated at Aga Khan Primary School in Kampala and at the International School in Tripoli, Libya. She was installed as the Batebe to her brother on 12 September 1996.
Princess (Omubiitokati) Celia Komukyeya	1994	October 1997	She died of leukaemia, at the Royal Marsden Hospital.

Preceded by Sir George Kamurasi Rukidi III	Omukama of Tooro; 1965–1995	Succeeded by Oyo Nyimba Iguru Rukidi IV
