= Rukidi =

Rukidi was the name of four kings of the Tooro Kingdom in modern-day Uganda:

- Rukidi I of Tooro (r. 1871)
- Rukidi II of Tooro (r. 1875)
- Rukidi III of Tooro (r. 1929–1965)
- Rukidi IV of Tooro (r. 1995–2026)

== See also ==
- Isingoma Labongo Rukidi (r. 16th century), king of Bunyoro-Kitara in modern-day Uganda
