= Beatrice Kiraso =

Ugandan politician

Beatrice Birungi Kiraso
- Born: Beatrice Birungi Kiraso; Kiburara Village, Hakibale Sub-county, Kabarole District, Uganda
- Other name: Mama Federation
- Education: Kiburara Primary School; Nyakasura School; Kyebambe Girls' School; Makerere University (Ba); Harvard University (MA)
- Occupations: Politician, public administrator, lecturer
- Years active: 1996–present
- Employer(s): East African Community; Makerere University
- Known for: Former Member of Parliament for Kabarole District; Deputy Secretary General of the East African Community; advocacy for East African Federation
- Title: Deputy Secretary General in Charge of Political Federation
- Parent: Edison Amooti Rusoke Kiraso

Beatrice Birungi Kiraso is a Ugandan politician known for her involvement in the political landscape of Uganda and the East African Community (EAC). She has been involved in public service for over two decades as a member of parliament for Kabarole district, the Deputy Secretary General of the East African Community, and as a lecturer at Makerere University

== Early life and education ==
Kiraso was born in Kiburara village, Hakibale Sub-county, Kabarole District, Uganda. She is the first of ten children born to the late Edison Amooti Rusoke Kiraso. Her educational journey began at Kiburara Primary School, followed by Nyakasura School for her O-Level examinations and Kyebambe Girls' Secondary School for her A-Levels. In 1981, she attended Makerere University, graduating with a Bachelor of Arts degree in Economics and Social Administration in 1984. She also holds a MA in Public Administration and a master's degree in Public Policy Management from Harvard University.

== Career ==
In 1996, Kiraso was elected unopposed as the Member of Parliament for Kabarole District, a position she held due to her extensive community work and empowerment initiatives. She was a member of Uganda's National Assembly and has served on the Budget Committee in Uganda's Parliament. After a nine-year hiatus from elective politics and a brief retirement, Kiraso returned to the political arena to support presidential hopeful Gen. Henry Tumukunde. She played a key role in his campaign, advocating for a "Renewed Uganda" with the slogan "It is Possible".

=== Contributions to the East African Community ===
Kiraso served as the Deputy Secretary General in Charge of Political Federation for the EAC. During her tenure, she completed two three-year terms and was instrumental in fast-tracking the efforts for the East African Federation and advancing the political integration of the EAC member states.

== Legacy and influence ==
Kiraso's spearheaded efforts to harmonise standards for the East African Community and establishment of East African political federation processes, hence the nickname "Mama Federation". In 2016, she was invited to run for the position of Executive Secretary of the International Conference on the Great Lakes Region because of her experience in regional affairs and conflict resolution.
