= Robina Bwita =

Ghanaian businesswomen

Robina Bwita, also known as Roninah Bwita and Robina Bwita Duckworth, is a businesswoman in Uganda.

== Businesses and investments ==
She is the owner of Travelers' Inn in Fort Portal, Kabarole District, in the Western Region, approximately 300 kilometres (186 mi) west of Kampala, Uganda's capital.
