= Kezia of Tooro =

Queen of Tooro from 1935 to 1965

Kezia Byanjeru
- Queen Mother of Tooro

Queen consort of Tooro Kingdom
- Tenure: 1935 – 1965
- Born: 1906
- Died: 1998 (aged 91–92); CMS hospital Fort portal
- Spouse: Rukidi III (died 1965)
- Issue: Rukirabasaija Patrick David Matthew (Rwamuhokya) Kaboyo Olimi III; Princess (Omubiitokati) Elizabeth Christobel Edith Bagaaya Nyabongo Akiiki; Princess (Omubiitokati) Mabel Komuntale; Prince (Omubiito) James George Desmond Mugenyi Muzimanuki; Princess (Omubiitokati) Damali Noel Komukyeya Kankya; Princess (Omubiitokati) Rachel Kabasweka
Names
- Kezia Byanjeru Bonabana Abwooli
- House: Biito-boyo (by marriage)
- Father: Nicodemo Kakoro, MBE served as tribal chief (Omwami) and Prime Minister (Omuhikirwa)
- Religion: Anglican

Kezia Byanjeru Abwooli (1906–1998) was the senior wife (Omugo w'ekitebe) of King George Rukidi III of Tooro (1904–1965). She was the mother of the 12th King Omukama of Tooro Rukirabasaija Patrick David Matthew (Rwamuhokya) Kaboyo Kaboyo Olimi III and Princess Elizabeth of Toro.

== Family and reign ==
Lady Kezia was the daughter of a senior tribal chief named Nikodemo Kakoro. She was the primary wife of King George Rukidi III of Tooro and later served as the king's chief advisor from 1965 to 1998. She was the mother of seven children, including Princess Elizabeth of Tooro.

Lady Kezia died in May 1998 at 93 years old at the CMS hospital in Fort portal.

=== Issue ===
Name	Birth	Death	Notes
Rukirabasaija Patrick David Matthew Kaboyo (Rwamuhokya) Olimi III	9 September 1945	26 August 1995	
Princess (Omubiitokati) Elizabeth Christobel Edith Bagaaya Nyabongo Akiiki	9 February 1936		A pioneering lawyer, former Minister of Foreign Affairs, and international diplomat who served as Batebe(Princess Royal)during her brotherOlimi III's reign
Prince (Omubiito) James George Desmond Mugenyi Muzimanuki	3 October 1948	7 September 2016	A military officer and later a regent for Rukidi IV.
Princess (Omubiitokati) Mabel Komuntale			Served as a member of the Regency Council to King Oyo from 1995 to 1997.
Princess (Omubiitokati) Damali Noel Komukyeya Kankya	24 December 1951	26 June 2021	Died of COVID-19
Princess (Omubiitokati) Rachel Kabasweka.		6 March 2021	Was living in London where she died

== See also ==
- Tooro Kingdom
- Ruhaga of Tooro
- Olimi III of Tooro
- Rukidi II of Tooro
- Princess Elizabeth of Tooro
