= Best Kemigisa =

Queen of Tooro from 1987 to 1995

Best Kemigisa Akiiki
- Queen Mother of Tooro
- Queen Mother Best in 2025

Queen consort of Tooro Kingdom
- Tenure: 10 January 1987 – 26 August 1995
- Born: 22 April 1967 (age 59); Rwebisengo, Tooro Kingdom, Uganda
- Spouse: Omukama Patrick David Matthew Kaboyo Rwamuhokya Olimi III (died 1995)
- Issue: Oyo Nyimba Kabamba Iguru Rukidi IV; Princess Ruth Nsemere Komuntale; Princess Celia Komukyeya
Names
- Best Kemigisa Akiiki
- House: Biito-boyo (by marriage)
- Father: Prince Mujungu
- Religion: Anglican

Best Kemigisa Akiiki (born 22 April 1967) was the Queen Mother (Omujwera Nyina Omukama) of Tooro Kingdom, based in Fort Portal city, Uganda. She is the mother to Rukirabasaija Oyo Nyimba Kabamba Iguru Amooti Rukidi IV, who was the Omukama of Tooro from 1995 until his death in 2026.

== Early life ==
She is the daughter of Prince (Omubiito) Mujungu, of the Batuku Tribe, of Rwebisengo in Present day Ntoroko district. At the time of her birth, Ntoroko was a county of Kabarole district before curving it around 1974 into Bundibugyo district alongside Bwamba County. She was educated at Kahinju Primary School, Mpanga Senior Secondary School and Kyebambe Girls School, all in Fort Portal city, Tooro Kingdom. She is the Founder and Patron of the Tooro Women's Development Association and a co-founder of the African Queens and Women Cultural Leaders Network. Queen Best Kemigisa is a passionate about issues that affect girls and women in Africa. She organises Hakyooto events in various parts of Africa to educate, entertain and empower people so that they are able to live their best lives.

== Queen Mother ==
Best Akiiki was widowed on 3 August 1995 when King Patrick Olimi Kaboyo II died suddenly. She was one of the guardians of her son, the new King and one of a team of regents who helped rule Tooro until he reached his majority in 2010.

Her daughter, Omubiitokati (Princess) Ruth Nsemere Komuntale, was married to African-American businessman Christopher Thomas, but they have since divorced.

== Controversies ==
Best took part in the controversial Kings and Sultans of Africa Forum set up by the then Libyan leader, Muammar Gaddafi.

She allegedly evicted 60-year-old John Businge from disputed land with the support of armed members of the King's security force.

Best brought charges of fraud against a man accused of stealing around $60,000 US from her, money supposed to be used to register her Toro Women's Organisation with the United Nations. Moses Kyeyune was convicted in May 2013 and sentenced to five years in prison.

She was also involved in a legal fight with a lawyer, Bob Kasango who she claimed had defrauded her of a large sum of money.

Her son, Rukidi IV, died on 27 August 2026. Subsequently, both Best Kemigisa and her daughter Ruth Komuntale rejected the selection of Edward Rukidi Kijanangoma as Rukidi IV's successor, citing a purported 2022 will in which Rukidi IV reportedly named a biological son as his heir. The Babiito royal clan, however, maintained that the succession should be determined according to Tooro's customs and traditions.
