= Pascal Simbikangwa =

- Born: 1959 (age 66–67); Karago, Ruanda-Urundi
- Political party: MRND
- Status: Incarcerated
- Convictions: Genocide; Crimes against humanity
- Penalty: 25 years imprisonment

Details
- Date apprehended: 28 October 2008
- Imprisoned at: Fresnes Prison

Pascal Simbikangwa is the former spy chief of Rwanda. Simbikangwa was an active propagandist during the Rwandan genocide in 1994 and was found guilty of crimes against humanity.

== Career and genocide ==
Simbikangwa, born in Karago in 1959, became disabled in 1986 following a car accident. He became head of Rwanda's Central Intelligence Agency. Simbikangwa was also captain of the presidential guard while he was the chief of intelligence.

He remained in these positions through the genocide, fleeing Rwanda in the late summer of 1994. Simbikangwa first fled to the Comoros Islands. In 2008, he filed for political asylum in Mayotte. He was arrested on 28 October 2008 for falsification of papers. He was tried in France under a French law that allows anyone accused of crimes against humanity to be extradited there.

== 2014 trial ==
During his 2014 trial in France, Simbikangwa was described as a close friend and distant cousin of Juvénal Habyarimana, whose assassination sparked ethnic tensions in Rwanda. Prosecutors showed that Simbikangwa was the a top shareholder in Free Radio-Television des Milles Collines, one of the main Hutu propaganda arms, which called openly for genocide. Simbikangwa was accused and found guilty of creating lists of Tutsi and moderate-Hutu leaders who would be targeted for genocide. Simbikangwa was found guilty on 14 March 2014 of "complicity in genocide and complicity in crimes against humanity." He was sentenced to 25 years in prison.
