= Fins Medical University =

Ugandan university

Fins Medical University (FMU)
- Type: Private
- Established: May 1, 2018; 8 years ago
- Chancellor: Samuel Murangi
- Location: Fort Portal, Uganda; 00°39′54″N 30°15′54″E
- Campus: Urban
- Website: Homepage
- Fins Medical University; Placement on map is approximate

The Fins Medical University (FMU) is a private university in Uganda, which offers undergraduate level training to healthcare workers from Uganda and neighboring countries.

== Location ==
The university campus is located at 40 Riverside Road, in the neighborhood called Kahungabunyonyi Rwengoma B in the Central Part of Fort Portal City, in the north-western environs of the city of Fort Portal, in Kabarole District, in the Western Region of Uganda. The geographical coordinates of the university campus are:0°39'54.0"N, 30°15'54.0"E (Latitude:0.665000; Longitude:30.265000).

== History ==
In 2010, Victor Kalenzi and his wife Philomenah Kalenzi, established Fort Portal International Nursing School (FINS). In May 2018, the institution was granted a university licence. It re-branded to Fins Medical University.

This private university is the only one in Uganda that offers medical-related courses exclusively. It admits males and females, both Ugandan citizens and noncitizens. The pioneer class of Fins Medical University was admitted in August 2019.

== Academics ==
As of June 2019, the following academic courses are on offer at Fins Medical University. (1) Bachelor of Science in Nursing (2) Bachelor of Science in Medical Education (3) Bachelor of Midwifery Science (4) Bachelor of Science in Public Health and (5) Bachelor of Biomedical Laboratory Technology. Other undergraduate degree courses are expected to be introduced in the 2020/2021 academic year.

Other available courses include the following: (a) Diploma in Midwifery (b) Diploma in Nursing (c) Diploma in Public Health (d) Diploma in Medical Education (e) Diploma in Pharmacy (f) Diploma in Health Sciences Management (g) Diploma in Clinical Medicine and Public Health.

== See also ==
- Education in Uganda
- List of universities in Uganda
