= Aston Kajara =

Ugandan lawyer and politician

Hon Aston Kajara
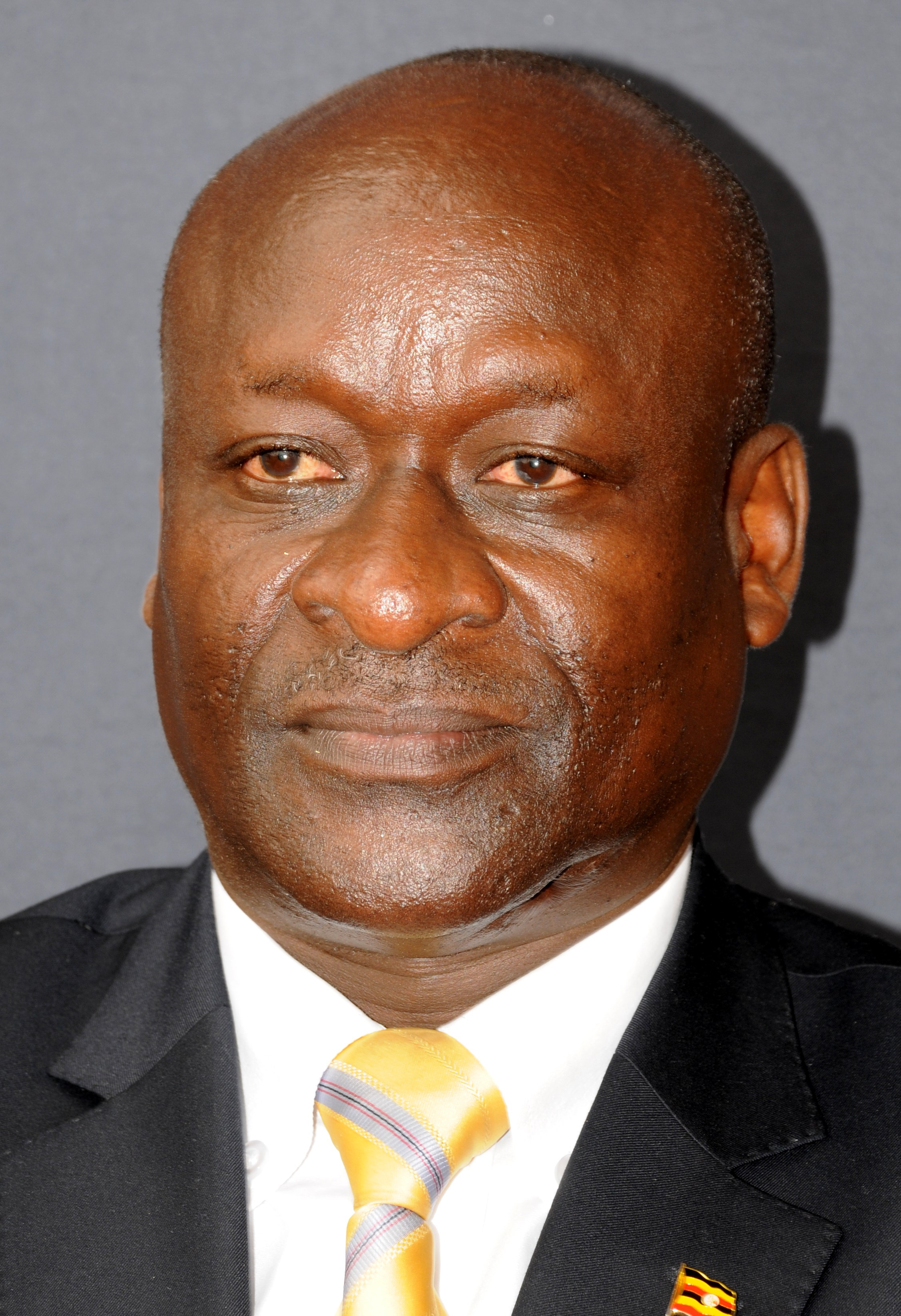
- Born: 19 September 1956 (age 69); Uganda
- Citizenship: Uganda
- Education: Makerere University (Bachelor of Laws); Law Development Centre (Diploma in Legal Practice)
- Occupations: Lawyer & Politician
- Years active: 1983 — present
- Known for: Politics
- Title: State Minister of Finance for Privatization
- Spouse: Mrs. Kajara

Aston Kajara is a Ugandan lawyer and politician. He is the current State Minister of Finance for Privatization in the Ugandan Cabinet. He was appointed to that position on 27 May 2011. In the cabinet reshuffle of 1 March 2015, he retained his cabinet post. Prior to that, from 16 February 2009 until 1 March 2015, he served as the State Minister of Finance for Investments. He is also the elected Member of Parliament (MP), representing Mwenge County South Kyenjojo District. He has represented that constituency in parliament from 2001 until 2006 and from 2011 until now.

== Background and education ==
He was born in Kyenjojo District on 19 September 1956. He attended Kyenjojo Primary School. He transferred to Nyakasura School in Fort Portal, for both his O-Level and A-Level studies. Aston Kajara studied law at Makerere University, Uganda's oldest university, earning the degree of Bachelor of Laws (LLB). He also holds the Diploma in Legal Practice, from the Law Development Center, in Kampala, Uganda's capital city.

== Before politics ==
Between 1983 until 1988, Aston Kajara worked in the Ministry of Finance, as a Customs Officer. From 1988 until 1990, he served as Board Member and Company Secretary at Uganda Motors Limited, a Ugandan automobile and industrial machinery distributing company, based in Kampala. Between 1992 and 1995, he served as Principal Revenue Officer at the Uganda Revenue Authority.

== Political career ==
In 1994, he was elected to the Constituent Assembly which drafted the 1995 Ugandan constitution. In 1995, he went into private legal practice as a Partner at Kajara, Kabiito & Company Advocates, also in Kampala. He maintained his law practice until 2001. In 1996 he contested for the parliamentary seat of Mwenge County South in Kyenjojo District. He won and served as the MP that constituency until 2001. In 2002, he became a Legal Consultant at his legal firm whose name had now changed to Kateeba, Runyangira & Kajara Advocates. In 2006, he regained his parliamentary seat of Mwenge County South. He was also appointed State Minister for Karamoja Affairs, serving in that position until his appointment to his current cabinet post in February 2009. In 2011, he was re-elected to parliament.

== Personal details ==
Aston Kajara is married. He enjoys social networking, sports and travel.

== See also ==
- Parliament of Uganda
- Cabinet of Uganda
- Kyenjojo District
