= Jessica Eriyo =

Ugandan educator and politician (1969–2022)

Jessica Eriyo MP

State Minister for the Environment of Uganda
- In office April 2006 – 27 May 2011

Deputy Secretary General of the East African Community
- In office 30 April 2012 – ?

Member of the Parliament of Uganda
- In office 2001–2011

District Population Officer in Adjumani District
- In office 1999–2001

Personal details
- Born: 26 August 1969 Adjumani District, Uganda
- Died: 12 August 2022 (aged 52) Houston, Texas, U.S.
- Party: National Resistance Movement
- Education: Makerere University (BA, MA)

Jessica Eriyo (Note: Sometimes spelled Jesca Eriyo) (26 August 1969 – 12 August 2022) was a Ugandan educator, social worker, politician and diplomat. She served as the Deputy Secretary General of the East African Community (EAC), responsible for Productive & Social Sectors. She was appointed to that position on 30 April 2012.

== Background and education ==
Eriyo was born in Adjumani District on 26 August 1969. She held a degree of Bachelor of Arts in social science and a diploma in education. She also held a certificate in project planning and management and a certificate in computer science. She was awarded a Master of Arts degree in development studies by Makerere University.

== Early career ==
In 1994, Eriyo worked as a high school teacher at Kololo Senior Secondary School in Kololo, an affluent suburb of Kampala, the capital of Uganda and the largest city in that country. Between 1998 and 1999, she was a teacher at Our Lady Consolata Senior Secondary School. She served as the district population officer in Adjumani District, from 1999 until 2001.

== Political career ==
Eriyo entered politics in 2001, contesting the parliamentary seat of Adjumani District Women's Representative. She won and was again re-elected in 2006 on the National Resistance Movement political party ticket, and served in the parliament until 2011. In the 2011 national elections, she lost her seat to Jesca Ababiku, an independent candidate.

2011 election
2011 Ugandan general election: District Women Representative Adjumani District
Party	Candidate	Votes	%
Independent	Jesca Ababiku	17,037	51.38
National Resistance Movement	Jesca Osuna Eriyo	14,231	42.92
Forum for Democratic Change	Hellen Achan	1,145	3.45
Independent	Mamawi Josephine Ujjeo	732	2.21

Eriyo served as the State Minister for the Environment in the Ugandan Cabinet, from 2006 until 2011. In the cabinet reshuffle of 27 May 2011, she was dropped and replaced by Flavia Munaaba.

In April 2012, Eriyo was appointed Deputy Secretary General for Productive and Social Sectors at the East African Community. She replaced Beatrice Kiraso, another Ugandan, who served in that position between April 2006 and April 2012.

== Personal life ==
Eriyo died at MD Anderson Cancer Center in Houston, United States, where she was undergoing treatment for cancer on 12 August 2022, at the age of 52.

== See also ==
- Ugandan Parliament
- Ugandan Cabinet
- Adjumani District
- EAC
- Ugandan Education
