= Munaaba =

Munaaba is a surname. Notable people with the surname include:

- Allan Tarsis Munaaba (born 1989), Ugandan footballer
- Flavia Munaaba, Ugandan politician
