= Hereditary monarchy =

Form of government and succession of power

A hereditary monarchy is a form of government and succession of power in which the throne passes from one member of a ruling family to another member of the same family. A series of rulers from the same family would constitute a dynasty. It is historically the most common type of monarchy and remains the dominant form in extant monarchies.

In most extant hereditary monarchies, the typical order of succession uses some form of primogeniture, but there exist other methods such as seniority and tanistry (in which an heir-apparent is nominated from among qualified candidates). Research shows that hereditary regimes, in particular primogeniture, are more stable than forms of authoritarian rule with alternative succession arrangements.

== Succession ==
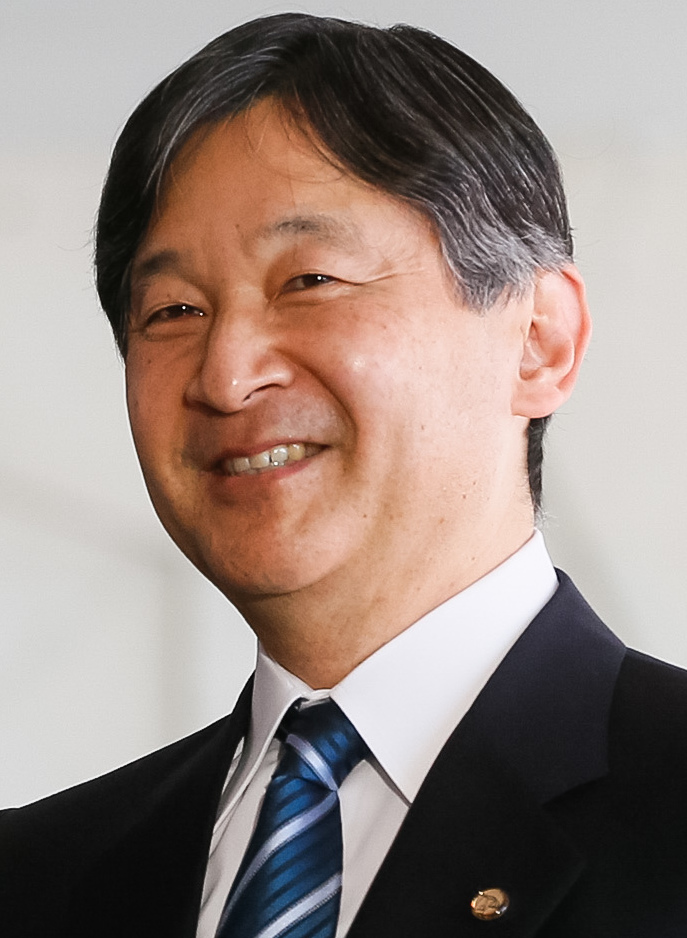
Emperor Naruhito is the hereditary monarch of Japan. The Japanese monarchy is the oldest continuous hereditary monarchy in the world.

Theoretically, when the monarch of a hereditary monarchy dies or abdicates, the crown typically passes to the next generation of the family. If no qualified child exists, the crown may pass to a brother, sister, nephew, niece, cousin, or other relative, in accordance with a predefined order of succession, often enshrined in legislation. Such a process establishes who will be the next monarch beforehand and avoids disputes among members of the royal family. Usurpers may resort to inventing semi-mythical genealogies to bolster their respectability.

Historically, there have been differences in systems of succession, mainly revolving around the question of whether succession is limited to males or whether females are also eligible (historically, the crown often devolved on the eldest surviving female child, as the ability to lead an army in battle was a requisite of kingship). Agnatic succession refers to systems where females are neither allowed to succeed nor to transmit succession rights to their male descendants (as according to the Salic law). An agnate is a kinsman with whom one has a common ancestor by descent in an unbroken male line. Cognatic primogeniture allows both male and female descendants to succeed, but males are usually given preference however gender equality has been an advocacy of the state in recent years. In absolute primogeniture, the eldest child can succeed to the throne regardless of sex; this system was adopted in 2011 by the monarchies in the Commonwealth (though not retrospectively affecting the order of succession). Another factor which may be taken into account is the religious affiliation of the candidate or the candidate's spouse, specifically where the monarch also has a religious title or role; for example, the British monarch has the title of supreme governor of the Church of England and may not profess Roman Catholicism.

== See also ==
- List of hereditary monarchies
- Absolute monarchy
- Heir presumptive
