= Pamela Annet Kirungi =

Ugandan politician

Woman Member of Parliament for Burahya Constituency
- In office May 2026 – 2031

Personal details
- Born: Uganda
- Party: National Resistance Movement (NRM)
- Occupation: Politician
- Known for: Elected unopposed as Woman MP for Burahya Constituency; Member of Uganda’s 12th Parliament (2026–2031)

Pamela Annet Kirungi is a Ugandan politician elected unopposed as the woman member of parliament representative for Burahya Constituency in Kabarole district in western Uganda. She will be serving in the 12th Parliament of Uganda from May 2026 to 2031.

Pamela Annet Kirungi was elected as a member of parliament on the National Resistance Movement (NRM) ticket.

== See also ==
Parliament of Uganda
