= List of hereditary monarchies =

A hereditary monarchy is the most common style of monarchy and is the form that is used by almost all of the world's existing monarchies.

Under a hereditary monarchy, all the monarchs come from the same family, and the crown is passed down from one member to another member of the family. The hereditary system has the advantages of stability, continuity and predictability, as well as the internal stabilizing factors of family affection and loyalty.

The following list is a list of hereditary monarchies and their current (as of 2024) monarchs.

== Monarchies of sovereign states ==
=== Africa ===
- Kingdom of Morocco – Mohammed VI
- Kingdom of Eswatini – Mswati III
- Kingdom of Lesotho – Letsie III

=== Americas ===
- Antigua and Barbuda – Charles III
- Commonwealth of The Bahamas – Charles III
- Belize – Charles III
- Canada – Charles III
- Grenada – Charles III
- Jamaica – Charles III
- Federation of Saint Kitts and Nevis – Charles III
- Saint Lucia – Charles III
- Saint Vincent and the Grenadines – Charles III

=== Asia ===
- Kingdom of Bhutan – Jigme Khesar Namgyal Wangchuk
- Brunei Darussalam – Hassanal Bolkiah
- Kingdom of Cambodia – Norodom Sihamoni
- Japan – Naruhito
- Kingdom of Thailand – Maha Vajiralongkorn

=== Europe ===
- Kingdom of Belgium – Philippe
- Kingdom of Denmark – Frederik X
- Principality of Liechtenstein – Hans-Adam II
- Grand Duchy of Luxembourg – Guillaume V
- Principality of Monaco – Albert II
- Kingdom of the Netherlands – Willem-Alexander
- Kingdom of Norway – Haakon VIII
- Kingdom of Spain – Felipe VI
- Kingdom of Sweden – Carl XVI
- United Kingdom of Great Britain and Northern Ireland – Charles III

=== Middle East ===
- Kingdom of Bahrain – Hamad ibn Isa Al Khalifah
- Hashemite Kingdom of Jordan – Abdullah II of Jordan
- State of Kuwait – Mishal Al-Ahmad Al-Jaber Al-Sabah
- Sultanate of Oman – Haitham bin Tariq Al Said
- State of Qatar – Tamim bin Hamad Al Thani
- Kingdom of Saudi Arabia – Salman of Saudi Arabia
- United Arab Emirates – Mohamed bin Zayed Al Nahyan

=== Oceania ===
- Commonwealth of Australia – Charles III
- Realm of New Zealand – Charles III
- Papua New Guinea – Charles III
- Solomon Islands – Charles III
- Kingdom of Tonga – Tupou VI
- Tuvalu – Charles III

== Sub-national monarchies ==
=== Africa ===
==== Côte d'Ivoire ====
- King of the Agni Sanwi – Okatamaisu Nana Amon N'duffu V

==== Ghana ====
- King of the Ashanti – Otumfuo Nana Osei Tutu II

==== Nigeria ====
- Kingdom of Benin – Ewuare II
- Kingdom of Ile-Ife – Adeyeye Enitan Ogunwusi
- Kano Emirate – Muhammadu Sanusi II
- Kingdom of Onitsha – Nnaemeka Alfred Ugochukwu Achebe
- Kingdom of Oyo – Abimbola Owoade
- Sultanate of Sokoto – Sa'adu Abubakar

==== South Africa ====
- King of the Zulus – Misuzulu Zulu

==== Uganda ====
- Kingdom of Buganda – Muwenda Mutebi II of Buganda
- Kingdom of Bunyoro – Solomon Iguru I
- Kingdom of Busoga – William Gabula
- Kingdom of Rwenzururu – Charles Mumbere
- Kingdom of Tooro – Nyabongo I of Tooro

=== Asia ===
==== Indonesia ====
- Sunanate of Surakarta – Susuhunan Pakubuwono XIII
- Sultanate of Yogyakarta – Hamengkubuwono X of Yogyakarta

==== Iraq ====
- Principality of Sheikhan – Hazim Tahsin Beg

==== Malaysia ====
- Sultanate of Johor – Ibrahim Ismail of Johor
- Sultanate of Kedah – Sallehuddin of Kedah
- Sultanate of Kelantan – Muhammad V of Kelantan
- Sultanate of Pahang – Abdullah of Pahang
- Sultanate of Perak – Nazrin Shah of Perak
- Kingdom of Perlis – Sirajuddin of Perlis
- Sultanate of Selangor – Sharafuddin of Selangor
- Sultanate of Terengganu – Mizan Zainal Abidin of Terengganu

==== United Arab Emirates ====
- Emirate of Abu Dhabi – Mohamed bin Zayed Al Nahyan
- Emirate of Ajman – Humaid bin Rashid Al Nuaimi III
- Emirate of Dubai – Mohammed bin Rashid Al Maktoum
- Emirate of Fujairah – Hamad bin Mohammed Al Sharqi
- (Emirate of Ras Al Khaimah) Emirate of Ras al-Khaimah – Saud bin Saqr al Qasimi
- Emirate of Sharjah – Sultan bin Muhammad Al-Qasimi
- (Emirate of Umm Al Quwain) Emirate of Umm al-Quwain – Saud bin Rashid Al Mu'alla

== See also ==
- Commonwealth realm
- List of monarchies
- List of dynasties
