= Jesca Ababiku =

Ugandan educator and politician

- Born: 17 July 1975 (age 51)
- Education: Primary: Adjumani Girls Primary School (1990) UCE: Metu Secondary School (1994) UACE: Moyo Secondary School (1997) Diploma in Education: Muni National Teachers College (1999) Bachelor of Education: Makerere University (2006) Master of Education: Gulu University (2013)
- Occupations: Teacher, Ugandan politician
- Political party: National Resistance Movement
- Spouse: Single

Jesca Ababiku (born 17 July 1975) is a Ugandan educator and politician. She is currently a member of the eleventh Parliament of Uganda, representing the people of Adjumani district in one of the parliamentary seats reserved for women. Ababiku is a member of the National Resistance Movement and the Chairperson of the Presidential Affairs (NRM), the ruling political party in Uganda under the chairmanship of Yoweri Kaguta Museveni Tibuhaburwa, the current president of the Republic of Uganda (as of 2021). In the 2021 Uganda general elections, Ababiku retained her seat democratically for the third time as women member of parliament for Adjumani district since 2011.

== Early life and education ==
Ababiku was born on 17 July 1975. She grew up in Adjumani district. She attended Adjumani Girls Primary School, graduating in 1990 with her Primary Leaving Examination. In 1994 she obtained her Uganda Certificate of Education from Metu Secondary School, in 1997 she obtained her Uganda Advanced Certificate of Education from Moyo Secondary School in Moyo Town, and in 1999 she graduated from the Muni National Teachers College with a Diploma in Education. In 2006, she obtained a bachelor's degree in education from Makerere University, and later on in 2013, she graduated from Gulu University with a master's degree in education.

== Career ==
=== Beginnings ===
Ababiku became a teacher shortly after graduating from the Muni National Teachers College. In 2000, she started teaching at Alere Secondary School, a government-aided school in the Adropi sub-county of the Adjumani District which was established in 1991 as a boarding school to assist refugee children, primarily from South Sudan.

In 2002, she became a Teachers Representative to the Board of Governors of Alere Secondary School, a position she held till 2004, and acted as class teacher and head of the history department from 2004 to 2006. She additionally became a District Councillor in the Adjumani District local government from 2002 to 2010 and was a Council Member of Kyambogo University from 2004 to 2010. She was Secretary of Production for the Adjumani District Local Government from 2004 to 2006, and from 2006 to 2010 she was council member of the national union of disabled persons of Uganda. Earlier in 2002 she had assumed the chairmanship of Adjumani disabled persons association, a position she held till 2010.

=== Political career ===
In 2010, Ababiku retired from being a teacher, from being a District Councillor for the Adjumani District Local Government, and from her roles with the National Union of Disabled Persons of Uganda and the Adjumani Disabled Persons Association to run for Parliament of Uganda. She ran as an independent (although she later became a member of the National Resistance Movement) for the District Woman Representative for the Adjumani District and won. She received 17,037 votes to win the four-way race for the seat.

2011 Election
2011 Ugandan general election: District Women Representative Adjumani District
Party	Candidate	Votes	%
Independent	Jesca Ababiku	17,037	51.38
National Resistance Movement	Jesca Osuna Eriya	14,231	42.92
Forum for Democratic Change	Hellen Achan	1,145	3.45
Independent	Mamawi Josephine Ujjeo	732	2.21

In parliament, Ababiku is a member of the Public Accounts Committee and the Committee on Presidential Affairs. She is also a member of the Uganda Women Parliamentary Association (UWOPA), where she is a member of the Employment Act/Economic empowerment round table committee that is chaired by Agnes Kunihira.

== Personal life ==
Jesca Ababiku is single. Her hobbies include listening to music and reading.

== See also ==
- List of members of the eleventh Parliament of Uganda
- Moses Ali
- Adjumani District
