= Nyabongo I of Tooro =

King of Tooro (2026 - )

Nyabongo I

Omukama of Tooro
- Reign: 12 September 2026 – present
- Coronation: 29 September 2026
- Predecessor: Rukidi IV
- Born: Rukidi Edward Kijanangoma c. 1970 (age 55–56)
- Spouse: Rebecca Amoding-Rukidi (m. 2018)
- House: Biito-boyo
- Father: Prince Christopher Paul Kijanangoma
- Mother: Yusta Asiimwe Kijanangoma Amooti

Rukidi Edward Nyabongo I (born Rukidi Edward Kijanangoma; c. 1970) is a Ugandan traditional ruler, former journalist and the current King of the Tooro Kingdom. On 9 September 2026, he was selected by the Babiito royal clan to succeed Oyo Nyimba Kabamba Iguru Rukidi IV as Omukama of Tooro, a selection endorsed by the Tooro Kingdom Supreme Council on 15 September. His coronation took place on 29 September 2026. The succession is disputed by Oyo's mother and sister, who cite a will naming an unacknowledged son as heir.

== Early life ==
Kijanangoma was born into the Babiito royal family to Prince Christopher Paul Kijanangoma and Yusta Asiimwe Kijanangoma Amooti. He is a grandson of Omukama Sir George David Kamurasi Rukidi III.

He is a member of the royal lineage of the Tooro Kingdom and a descendant of Kaboyo Kasusunkwanzi Olimi I, who is traditionally regarded as the founder of the Tooro Kingdom. He was also a cousin of Omukama Oyo Nyimba Kabamba Iguru Rukidi IV.

== Career ==
Before his selection to the royal succession, Kijanangoma pursued a career in journalism and broadcasting. He worked for the Uganda Broadcasting Corporation (UBC) as a television news anchor and editor. He became known on Ugandan television through his presentation of English-language news bulletins, including UBC News Tonight. He also served as a senior news editor and resource manager at UBC.

== Omukama of Tooro ==
Following the death of Omukama Oyo Nyimba Kabamba Iguru Rukidi IV on 27 August 2026, after a reign that began in 1995, the Babiito royal clan began the process of selecting his successor. On 9 September 2026, a 21-member Babiito royal clan succession committee, headed by Musuuga Charles Kayondo Kamurasi, selected Prince Edward Rukidi Kijanangoma as Oyo's successor. His selection was announced at Karuziika Palace in Fort Portal.

The decision was later endorsed by the Tooro Kingdom Supreme Council on 15 September 2026. The council recognised Kijanangoma as Oyo's successor and supported his reign under the name Edward Rukidi Nyabongo I. The Babiito royal clan and the Tooro Kingdom Supreme Council scheduled his coronation and enthronement for 29 September 2026 at Karuziika Palace in Fort Portal.

== Succession controversy ==
Kijanangoma's selection as successor was followed by a dispute involving members of Omukama Oyo Nyimba Kabamba Iguru Rukidi IV's immediate family. Princess Ruth Komuntale and Queen Mother Best Kemigisa rejected the selection, citing a purported 2022 will in which Oyo reportedly named a biological son as his heir. The Babiito royal clan, however, maintained that the succession should be determined according to Tooro's customs and traditions.

== See also ==
- Canary Mugume
- Samson Kasumba

Nyabongo I of Tooro Born: 1970
Regnal titles
| Preceded by Rukidi IV of Tooro | Omukama of Tooro; 29 September 2026 - | Succeeded by |
