= Karago =

Settlement in Uganda

- Location in Uganda; Placement on map is approximate.
- Coordinates: 00°40′37″N 30°11′48″E
- Country: Uganda
- Region: Western Uganda
- District: Kabarole District
- Municipality: Karago Municipality
- County: Burahya
- Elevation: 5,600 ft (1,700 m)

Population
  - Total: 12,045 (2,015 estimate)

Karago (Note: Karago Municipality was also referred to as Karago Town Council.) was a municipality in the Western Region of Uganda. In 2019, Karago was annexed by the city of Fort Portal, as part of the award of Tourism City status. It became a neighborhood in the Northern Division of Fort Portal City.

== Location ==
Karago Municipality was located in Karago Parish, Bukuku subcounty, Burahya County, in Kabarole District, in the Toro sub-region, in the Western Region of Uganda.

The neighborhood lies along the Fort Portal–Bundibugyo–Lamia Road, approximately 11 kilometres (7 mi) northwest of the city center of Fort Portal, of which it is now a component. The geographical coordinates of Karago are:0°40'37.0"N, 30°11'48.0"E (Latitude: 0.676944; Longitude: 30.196667).

== Overview ==
Karago is a growing urban neighborhood in Fort Portal City, the capital of Kabarole District and the largest city in the Toro sub-region. Online sources report the area size of the neighborhood as 14.7 square kilometres (6 sq mi). In 2015, the population of Karago was estimated at 12,045, of whom 6,127 (50.9 percent) were female and 5,918 (49.1 percent) were male.

== Karago Drinking Water Supply Project ==
The government of Uganda (GOU), through the Ugandan Ministry of Water and Environment carried out the first phase of bringing potable water to Karago. Phase 1 concluded in October 2021.

In September 2022, the GOU launched the second phase of this water supply project, intended to bring clean water to 21 villages surrounding the neighborhood of Karago. Phase 2 involves the installation of a "pressed steel reservoir" with storage capacity of 300 cubic meters (300,000 L), on the side of the mountain. This will be supplemented by the construction of a 100 cubic meters (100,000 L) "reinforced concrete tank", two suppression stations and a 50 cubic meters (50,000 L) "concrete sump". 15 public taps will be erected and approximately 400 metres (1,300 ft) of PVC pipe will be laid to distribute the drinking water to the target population.

The engineering, procurement and construction (EPC) contractor for phase II is Vidas Engineering Services, a Ugandan company with headquarters in Ntinda, in Kampala. Water and Sanitation Development Facility–South West (WSDF–SW), a collaborative undertaking between GOU and the European Union is the supervising engineer. The contract value is UGX:4.7 billion (approx. US$1.2 million). Construction is expected to take 12 months.

The table below illustrates the projection of the target population over the first 25 years of the project.

Historical population
Year	Pop.	±%
2023	11,564	—
2024	15,542	+34.4%
2044	20,888	+34.4%

== See also ==
- Rwenzori Mountains
