= Nyakasura School =

Coordinates: 0°40′18″N 30°13′12″E

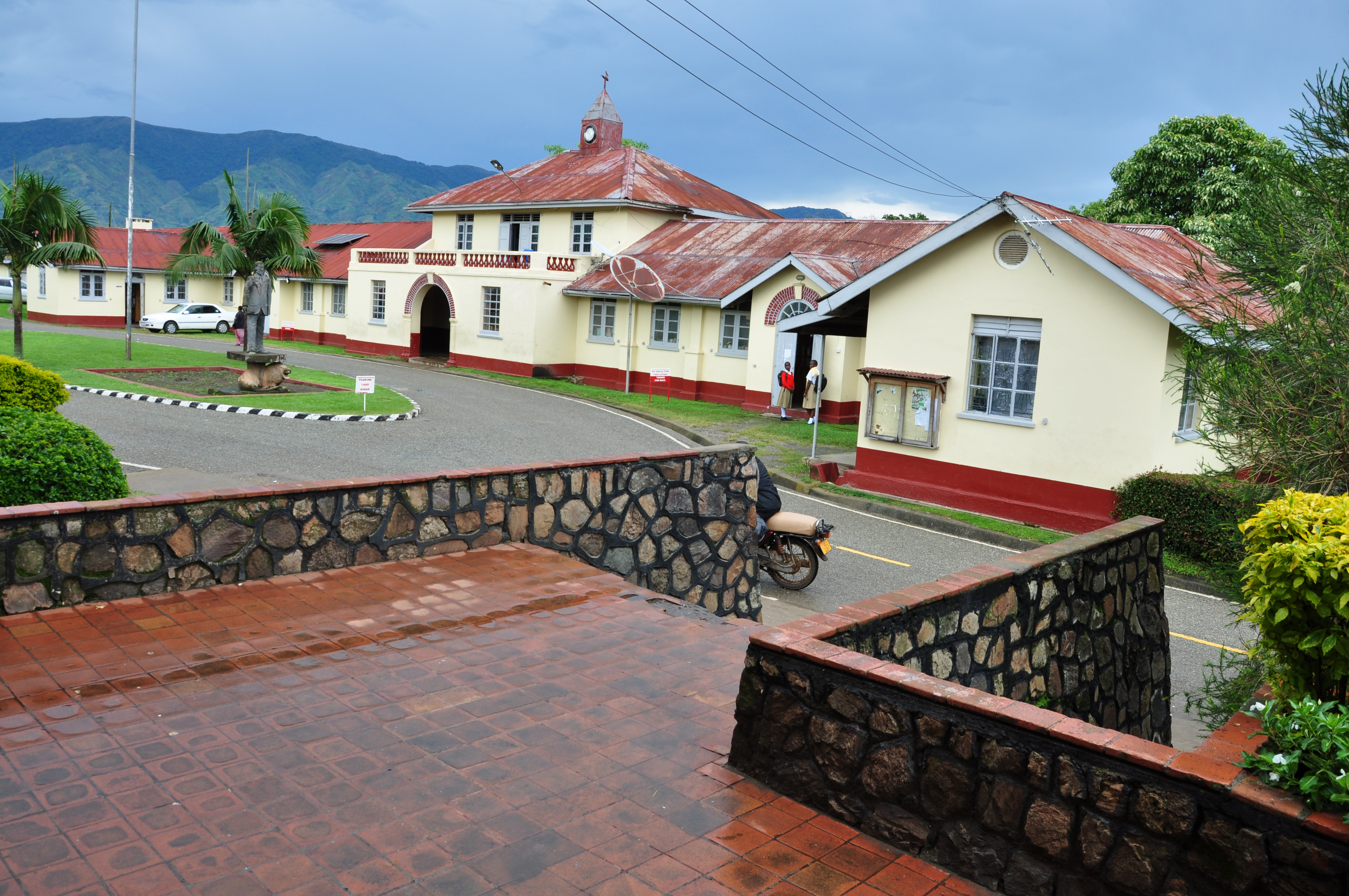
- Fort Portal, Kabarole District; Uganda

Information
- Type: Public Middle School and High School (8-13)
- Motto: To Minister And Not To Be Ministered Unto
- Established: 1926
- Principal: Frank Manyindo
- Enrollment: 970
- Athletics: Athletics, tennis, volleyball, basketball, netball, cricket
- Website: Homepage

Nyakasura School is a mixed, boarding, middle, and high school in Fort Portal, Kabarole District, Western Region of Uganda.

== Location ==
The school is located in Nyakasura, off the Fort Portal-Bundibugyo Road, approximately 6.5 kilometres (4.0 mi), by road, north-west of the central business district of Fort Portal.

== History ==
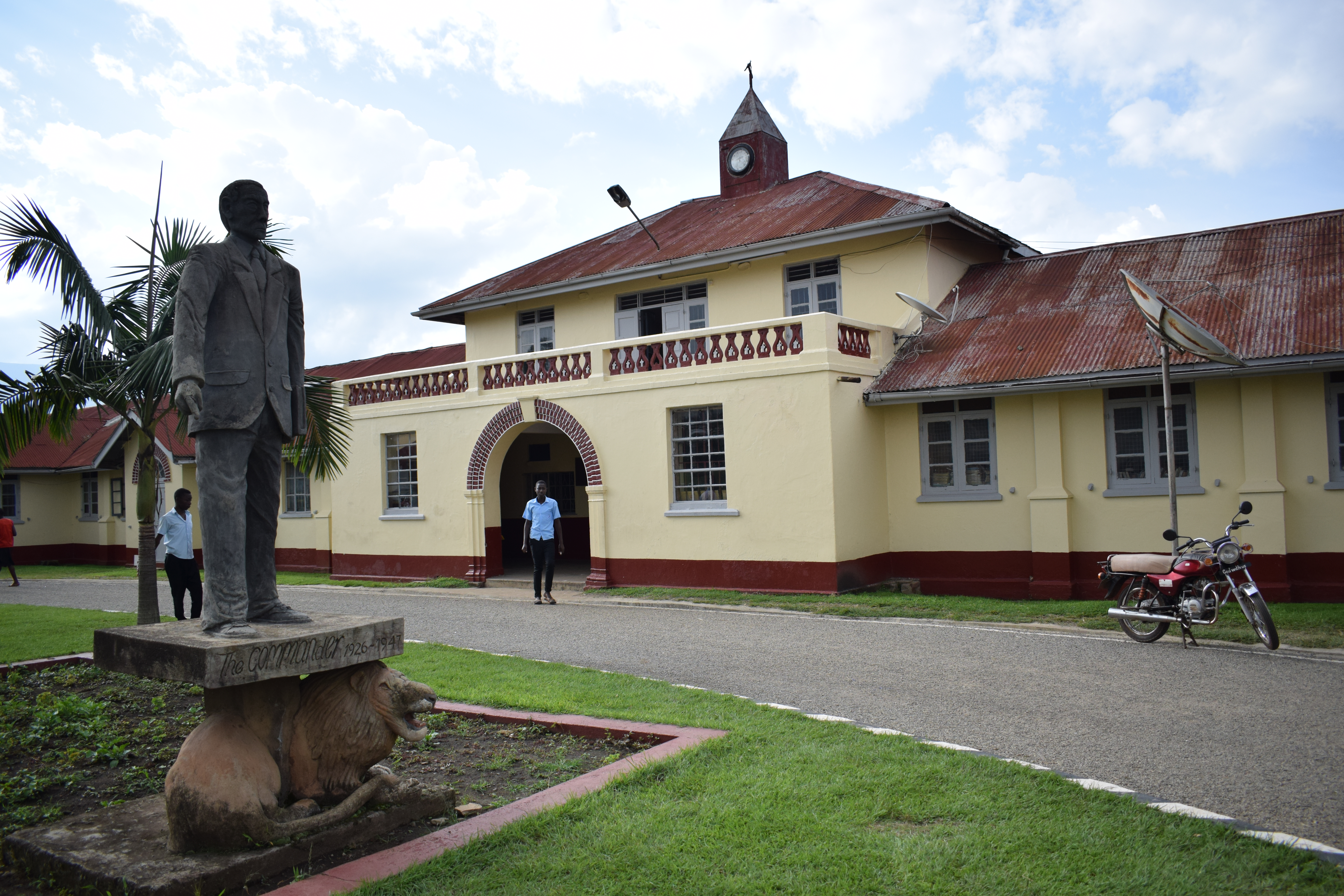
Founder, Builder & first Headmaster of Nyakasura School (1926-1947)

The school was founded by Scotsman Ernest Ebohard Calwell, a retired naval officer, in 1926. Calwell was a teacher at King's College Budo when he fell out with the headmaster there. They had differences on what uniform the students should wear. There were two students from Toro Kingdom at Buddo at that time, by the names of Komwiswa and Byara. They convinced Calwell to come and ask the Omukama of Toro for land to set up a school like Buddo in Toro. Rukirabasaija Daudi Kasagama Kyebambe III showed the Calwell three sites, out of which he selected Nyakasura. He selected Scottish kilts as the boys' uniform.

== Notable alumni ==
- Andrew Mwenda - journalist and community activist
- Crispus Kiyonga - physician and politician. Minister of Defense in the Cabinet of Uganda
- Patrick Bitature - businessman, entrepreneur, and industrialist. chairman of the Private Sector Foundation Uganda, Umeme, and Electromaxx Uganda.
- Edward Rugumayo - author, politician, diplomat, academic, and environmentalist. Chancellor of Kampala University and Mountains of the Moon University.
- Jaberi Bidandi Ssali - politician and businessman. Former member of parliament for Nakawa Division. Minister for Local Government from 1989 until 2004. Founder of the People's Progressive Party.
- Aston Kajara - lawyer and politician. State Minister of Finance for Privatization.
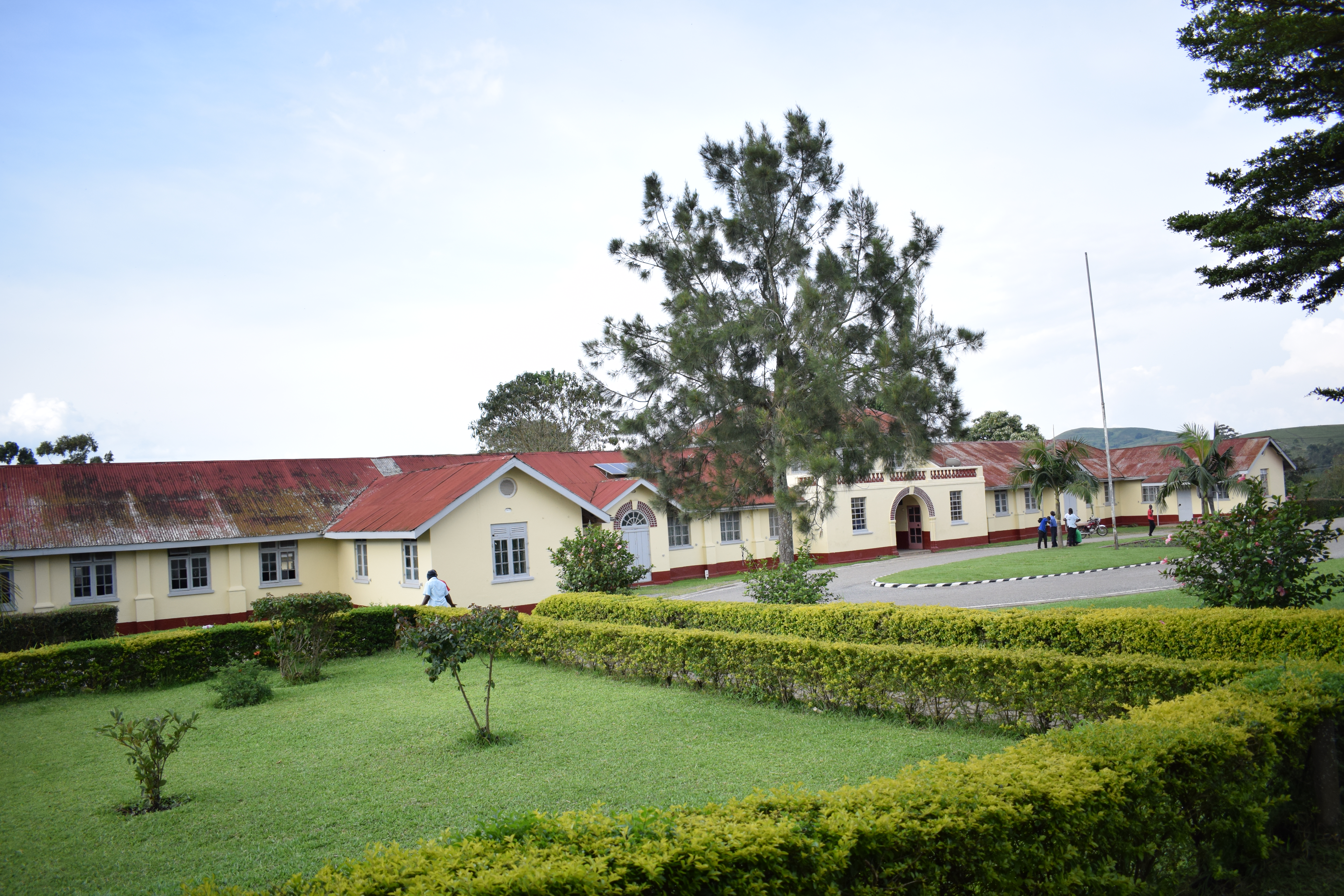
- Nyakasura School
  Olimi III of Toro - 12th Omukama of the Kingdom of Toro, Ugandan diplomat.

== See also ==
- Education in Uganda
- Kabarole District
