= Asaba Ruyonga =

Ugandan politician

Asaba Edson Ruyonga is a Ugandan politician who served for three terms as mayor of Fort Portal City from 2001 to 2016. Ruyonga hails from Tooro Kingdom, one of the ancient traditional monarchies of Uganda.

== Career ==
He was elected on the Forum for Democratic Change (FDC) ticket in 2006 before later crossing over to NRM. He once served three terms as the mayor of then Fort Portal Municipality (2001-2016). He later lost his seat in the 2016 general elections and staged a successful comeback five years later. He was elected as the mayor of Fort Portal Tourism City in January 2021 as a candidate for NRM, defeating Rev. Willy Kintu Muhanga with 15,312 votes.
