= Andrew Mwenda =

Ugandan journalist (born 1972)

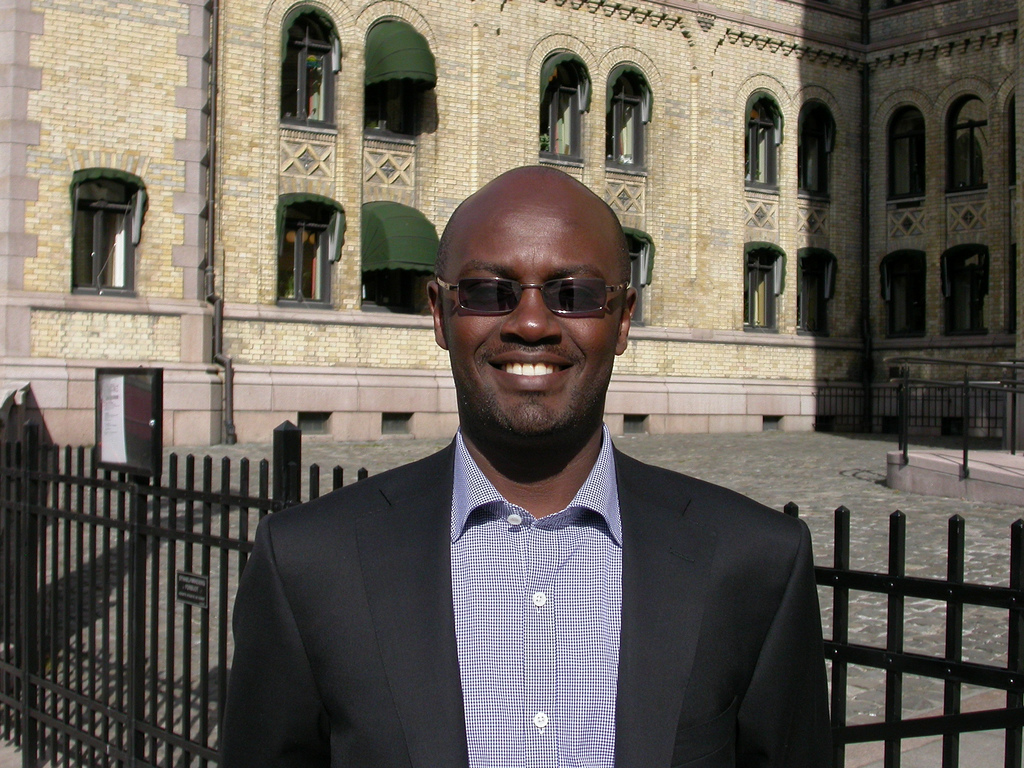
- Mwenda in 2008
- Born: 1972 (age 53–54); Fort Portal, Uganda
- Citizenship: Uganda
- Education: Busoga College Mwiri (High School Diploma); Makerere University (Bachelor of Arts in Journalism); SOAS, University of London (Master of Arts in Development Studies)
- Occupations: Journalist & community activist
- Years active: since 1992
- Known for: Publications

Andrew Mwenda (born 1972) is a Ugandan print, radio and television journalist, and the founder and owner of The Independent, a current affairs newsmagazine. He was previously the political editor of The Daily Monitor, a Ugandan newspaper, and was the presenter of Andrew Mwenda Live on KFM Radio in Kampala, Uganda's capital city.

== Background and education ==
Mwenda was born in 1972 in Fort Portal, Kabarole District, in the Western Region of Uganda. His father is Mzee Phillip Muhanga of Fort Portal. Mwenda is a younger brother to Lieutenant General Kayanja Muhanga, the Commander of Land Forces (CLF) of the UPDF and Margaret Muhanga, the minister of state for primary health care.

After attending primary school locally, Mwenda entered Nyakasura School where he completed his O-Level studies. He attended Mbarara High school for A-level education where he participated in a student strike against the Headmaster Mr. Bagatagira. He subsequently repeated his A-level studies when he was then admitted to Busoga College Mwiri in the Eastern Region of Uganda. He graduated with a High School Diploma from Mwiri. He was admitted to Makerere University, Uganda's oldest and largest public university, where he graduated with a Bachelor of Arts in Journalism.

Later, he won a Chevening Scholarship and was admitted to the School of Oriental and African Studies at the University of London, where he graduated with a Master of Science in Development Studies. He was a visiting fellow at Yale University, in 2010. He also studied as a fellow at Saïd Business School at the University of Oxford in 2009. Mwenda was a John Knight Fellow at Stanford University between 2006 and 2007 a non academic journalism fellowship. He was a visiting lecturer at the University of Florida, Gainesville, in 2005, and a visiting fellow at the Africa Study Centre of the University of Leiden, in the Netherlands in 2003.

In 2008, the World Economic Forum selected Mwenda as a Young Global Leader (https://blog.ted.com/mwenda_shikwati/) and in 2010, Foreign Policy Magazine named him among the 100 Top Global Thinkers. In 2011, President Paul Kagame of Rwanda nominated Mwenda to serve on his Presidential Advisory Council. In 2012 and 2013, Mwenda was named by Foreign Policy among the global top 100 most influential persons on Twitter. In 2013, he cofounded a social enterprise, Tugende, with Michael Wilkerson and Matt Brown, a company dedicated to helping young people own assets from which they derive their livelihoods. Tugende has since been one of the fastest growing companies and now boasts of over 25,000 customers who are owners of such assets and another 30,000 who are in the process of securing ownership through micro finance loans.

In 2011, Mwenda helped negotiate a truce between President Yoweri Museveni of Uganda and Kagame of Rwanda, bringing the two leaders together and helping end their intractable conflicts between them and their two countries. Between 2011 and 2018, he worked as a de facto envoy of each president to the other and helped maintain a cordial relationship between them as individuals and also between the two countries. This arrangement finally collapsed in 2018, unleashing a new round of hostilities that led to the closure of the Uganda-Rwanda border for three years.

In 2005, he was among sixteen senior journalists invited by the British government to discuss with Prime Minister Tony Blair the forthcoming report of the Commission for Africa.

== Work history ==
Mwenda is the managing director of Independent Publications Limited, the publishers of The Independent, a current affairs newsmagazine. An admirer of Socrates, Karl Popper, and Frederick Von Hayek, he is an activist, a journalist, a columnist, a part-time poet, a businessman, and a social entrepreneur.

Mwenda is a recognised African voice in the global debate on the failures of foreign aid to Africa and the need for investment and trade as drivers of growth. A TED speaker, he is a regular speaker at conferences across the world.

Mwenda worked as a political editor of the Daily Monitor and general manager of its affiliate on FM radio, KFM, before establishing The Independent in 2007. He has worked as a consultant for the World Bank, the World Resources Institute, and Transparency International. He has also written for international news media like Der Spiegel, the International Herald Tribune, The New York Times, and Foreign Policy. He also has produced documentaries for BBC World television and radio.

Mwenda has also authored and co-authored articles for international academic journals like Africa Affairs, the Journal of Modern African Studies, the Review of African Political Economy, the Journal of Commonwealth Studies, the Journal for Contemporary African Studies, and the Journal of Democracy on top of publishing chapters in several books.

In August 2005, he was charged with sedition for broadcasting a discussion of the cause of death of Sudanese vice-president John Garang. Garang was killed when the Ugandan presidential helicopter smashed in a storm over a rebel area, on the way back from talks in Uganda. During his radio programme, the journalist accused the Ugandan government of "incompetence" and said they had put Garang on "a junk helicopter at night, in poor weather over an insecure area".

In April 2008, he was arrested and released on bail by the Ugandan government for "being in possession of seditious material and of publishing inflammatory articles".

== Community activism ==
In July 2006, Mwenda appeared before the British House of Commons committee on Global Poverty to testify against aid to Africa. He has written widely on the effects of aid on the development process in Africa and been published in such prestigious newspapers as the International Herald Tribune and Der Spiegel and done radio and television documentaries for the BBC on this subject. Mr. Mwenda has also been widely quoted in international media, including the BBC, CNN, The New York Times, The Washington Post, The Times, The Economist, and many other newspapers, radio and television networks in Europe and North America.

He has criticised aid agencies and charities for what he says is their ineffectiveness and collusion with corruption. He believes that western aid has been largely unhelpful for African development, since it encourages dependency, sustains wars and fuels corrupt states. He argues that aid goes to the least deserving states, those that have failed their people, rather than those that have reformed. In June 2007, he gave a speech about these issues at the TED conference in Arusha, Tanzania.

In 2014, Mwenda was among the petitioners for annulling The Uganda Anti-Homosexuality Act, 2014.

On 3 February 2019, Mwenda launched the Uganda National Peoples' Democratic Revolutionary Front (UNPDRF) in the bushes of Kanyandahi in western Uganda with six men and five sticks. He declared himself supreme shogun of the UNPDRF and Charles Onyango Obbo its chief ideologue. On social media, he declared that the cause of the UNPDRF was "battle Museveni's corrupt dictatorship, Besigye's radical extremism and Bobi Wine's empty-headed demagoguery."

The UNPDRF shares a similar name with a left wing political coalition in Ethiopia, The Ethiopian People's Revolutionary Democratic Front (EPRDF) led by Ethiopian prime minister Abiy Ahmed, but it is unlikely that the UNPDRF is supported or associated to the EPRDF.

== Awards ==
Mwenda won the CPJ International Press Freedom Awards in 2008 sponsored by the Committee to Protect Journalists, "in tribute to his commitment to a free press in Uganda and the whole world".

== Journal contributions ==
- 2007: Investieren Geht uber Schmieren, Entwicklungspolitik, December 2007, Nr. 12 62 Jahr.
- 2007: Personalizing power in Uganda, Journal for Democracy, July 2007, Volume 18, Number 3
- 2006: "Sustaining Growth and Achieving Deep Reductions in Poverty: How Uganda Recovered from Conflict"; in Attacking Africa's Poverty: Experience from the Ground Edited by Louise Fox and Bob Liebenthal, World Bank, Washington DC.
- 2006: Foreign aid the Weakening of Democratic Accountability in Uganda (a policy briefing paper for the Cato Institute, a think tank in Washington DC.
- 2006: With Roger Tangri: 'Politics, Donors, and the Ineffectiveness of Anti-Corruption Institutions in Uganda', Journal of Modern African Studies, 44, 1 (2006)
- 2005: With Roger Tangri: 'Patronage Politics, Donor Reforms, and Regime Consolidation in Uganda', African Affairs, 104, 416 (2005), 449–67.
- 2003: With Roger Tangri: "Military Corruption and Ugandan Politics since the late 1990s." in the Review of African Political Economy No. 98, 2003.

2001: With Prof. Roger Tangri, Corruption and Cronyism in Uganda's Privatisation in the 1990s, Africa Affairs 100–398 (2001) 87–103

== Awards ==
He received the International Press Freedom Award (2008) from the Committee to Protect Journalists for his work as a journalist and advocate of press Freedom.
