= Roger Tangri =

British academic

Roger Tangri (born in Glasgow, Scotland in 1941) is a British as well as United States citizen. He is a political scientist and Africanist with an expertise in the politics of Ghana and Uganda.

Tangri has previously taught at the University of Botswana, the International Institute of Social Studies in The Hague, the US Foreign Service Institute, the University of Maryland, College Park, the School of International Service at the American University, Makerere University in Uganda, the National University of Lesotho, the University of Ghana, the American University in Cairo, the University of Malawi, the University of Zambia, the University of Sierra Leone, the University of Manchester in England, and the University of Nairobi.

== Selected works ==
- "The Politics of Elite Corruption in Africa. Uganda in Comparative Perspective", Routledge, 2013.
- The Politics of Patronage in Africa. Parastatals, Privatization, and Private Enterprise, James Currey, Oxford 1999 (ISBN 0865437467)
- Politics in Sub-Saharan Africa, James Currey, Oxford 1985
- With Andrew Mwenda, Politics, Donors, and the Ineffectiveness of Anti-Corruption Institutions in Uganda, 2006, Journal of Modern African Studies.
- With Andrew Mwenda, Patronage Politics, Donor Reforms, and Regime Consolidation in Uganda, 2005, African Affairs
- With Andrew Mwenda, Military Corruption and Uganda Politics Since the Late 1990s, 2003, Review of African Political Economy
