= African Queens and Women Cultural Leaders Network =

Voluntary network of female cultural leaders across Africa

The African Queens and Women Cultural Leaders Network (AQWCLN) is a voluntary network of female cultural leaders across Africa that seeks to advocate for the advancement and improve the lives of women and girls across the continent.

== History ==
The AQWCLN was formed in September 2013 when more than forty queens, queenmothers and other female cultural leaders from sixteen different African countries met in Kampala, Uganda, supported by UN Women and the African Union. The Network was established in response to the 2012 "Harare Call to Action" at a meeting hosted by the GlobalPower Women Network Africa, which sought to establish meaningful networks with religious, traditional and cultural leaders in the implementation of programs to protect and promote the rights of women and girls in the African Union. The launch was hosted by Queen Sylvia Nagindda of Buganda Kingdom and Queen Best Kemigisa, the Queenmother of Tooro Kingdom.

The network has chapters in various African countries including Ghana, Uganda, and Malawi.

== Commitments ==
The AQWCLN has resolved to eradicate negative cultural practices, especially female genital mutilation and early marriages. They have issued calls for the release of the victims of the Chibok schoolgirls kidnapping as well as other girls kidnapped by Boko Haram.

== Notable members ==
- Sylvia Nagginda Luswata
- Best Kemigisa
- Nana Adwoa Awindor
