= Princess Elizabeth of Tooro =

Ugandan politician (born 1936)

Elizabeth Bagaaya
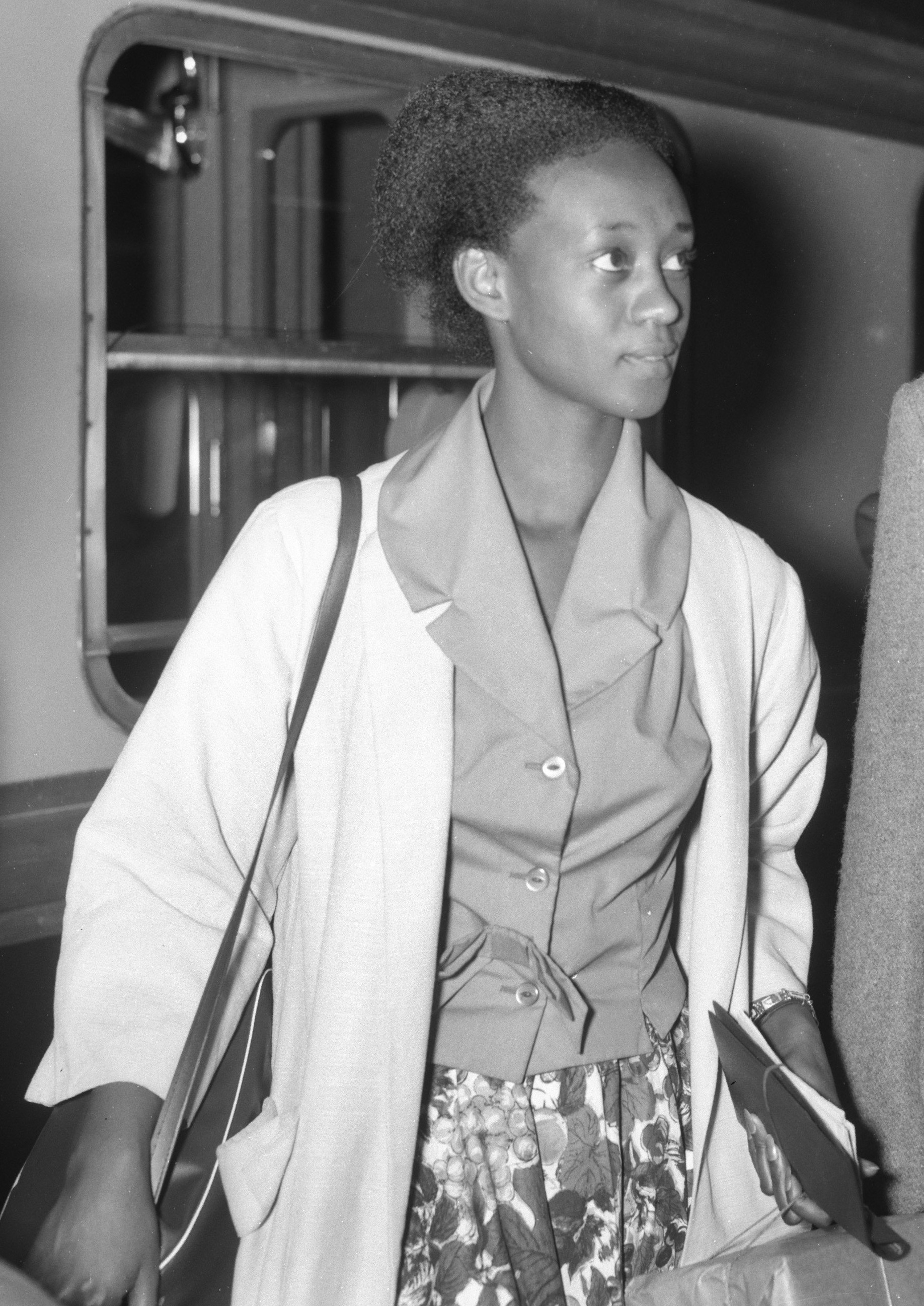
- Elizabeth in 1959

Batebe of Tooro Kingdom
- Reign: 2 March 1966 – 12 September 1995
- Predecessor: Omubiitokati (Princess) Ruth Komuntale Keesi Bahindi
- Successor: Omubiitokati (Princess) Ruth Nsemere Komuntale Farquharson Akiiki
- Born: 9 February 1936 (age 90)
- Spouse: Omubiito (Prince) Wilberforce Nyabongo (m. 1981; died 1986)
Names
- Elizabeth Christobel Edith Bagaaya Nyabongo Akiiki
- House: Biito-boyo
- Father: Rukidi III
- Mother: Queen Kezia
- Religion: Anglican

Elizabeth Christobel Edith Bagaaya Akiiki (born 9 February 1936) is Uganda's first female lawyer, a politician, a diplomat and a model who served as the Batebe (Princess Royal) of the Kingdom of Tooro, until 12 September 1995. She was succeeded in that role by her niece Omubiitokati (Princess) Ruth Nsemere Komuntale Farquharson Akiiki.

She is the daughter of King George Mathew David Kamurasi Rukidi and Queen Kezia Byanjeru. She was the first East African woman to be admitted to the English Bar. In 1966, she was called the Ugandan Bar, becoming the first woman to qualify as a barrister in Uganda. She is a paternal aunt (Isenkati) of notable figures; the 13th Omukama of Tooro, Rukidi IV, the current Batebe (Princess Royal) Omubiitokati (Princess) Ruth Nsemere Komuntale Farquharson Akiiki children of her brother the 12th Omukama of Tooro, Olimi III. Omubiitokati (Princess) Juliana Kanyomozi Akiiki and Omubiitokati (Princess) Laura Kahunde Abwooli children of her younger brother Omubiito (Prince) Gerald Philip Manyindo Atwooki. She briefly served as Minister of Foreign Affairs under President Idi Amin from February to November 1974.

After the abolition of Uganda's traditional monarchies in 1967, she began an international modelling career. She worked with the Peter Lumley Agency in Britain and the Ford Agency in the United States. She is notable for breaking barriers in law, international modelling, diplomacy and public services, particularly as one of the earliest East African women to enter the legal profession at an international level.

== Early life and education ==
The Princess was born in 1936 to Rukidi III of Tooro, the eleventh Omukama of Tooro who reigned between 1928 and 1965. Her mother was Queen Kezia, a daughter of Nikodemo Kakoro, a senior chief. Her title from birth was Omubiitokati meaning "princess."

Elizabeth attended Kyebambe Girls' Secondary School before she was sent to live in the neighbouring Kingdom of Buganda, where she attended Gayaza High School, a girls' boarding school. In 1957, Dame Diana Reader Harris of Sherborne School for Girls in England visited Elizabeth's classroom while in search for an alternative international exchange relationship, Sherborne's previous arrangement with a distinguished school in Peking having fallen through in the face of the communist revolution in China. Elizabeth was soon sent to the home of Georgina Schofield — a missionary friend of her father's — in Melksham before reporting to Sherborne in Dorset.

At Sherborne, Elizabeth was the only black student. "I felt that I was on trial and that my failure to excel would reflect badly on the entire black race," she later wrote. With only one year to prepare, she was accepted into Girton College, Cambridge, the third African woman to be admitted to the University of Cambridge in the institution's history. In 1962, she graduated from Cambridge with a law degree. Three years later, in 1965, the princess became a barrister-at-law as a member of Gray's Inn, becoming the first woman from East Africa to be called to the English Bar. She appeared in major international publications including Vogue, Harper's Bazaar, LIFE, Look and Ebony, becoming one of the prominent Black models of the 1960s.

== Royal life and career ==
On the morning of 21 December 1965, having hosted a gala in celebration of her entry to the bar the night before, Elizabeth received a telephone call informing her of her father's death. Her brother, Patrick David Matthew Kaboyo Olimi was enthroned as Olimi III, the twelfth Omukama of Tooro that day and was crowned March of the following year. He reigned from 1965 until 1995. At the coronation, Elizabeth received the title and office of Batebe (Princess Royal), which traditionally made her the most powerful woman in the Tooro Kingdom and the most trusted adviser of the king. However, Elizabeth and Olimi III's paternal aunt, the former Batebe and eldest sister of their father Rukidi III, Princess (Omubiitokati) Ruth Komuntale continued to be referred to as Batebe and kept the title until the day she died.

King Fredrick Mutesa II of Buganda, another of Uganda's traditional kingdoms, was now the president, with Prime Minister Milton Obote. Barely one year after the coronation of the Omukama Olimi III, Obote attacked the Buganda Palace, sending Edward Muteesa II into exile, and declared himself president. Soon, he abolished all Ugandan traditional kingdoms, including the Tooro Kingdom. Elizabeth was afraid for her brother's life, but he escaped to London.

Elizabeth later completed an internship at a law firm, and became Uganda's first female lawyer. She was a virtual prisoner in her own country until Princess Margaret of the United Kingdom sent her an invitation to model in a charity fashion show. The princess was a smash hit, and soon became a highly successful fashion model, being featured in many magazines. She was the first black model to grace the pages of Harper’s Bazaar in 1969, making history as one of the first African women to appear in high-fashion editorials. Jacqueline Kennedy Onassis met Elizabeth at a party, and convinced her to move to New York City.

In 1970, the novel Things Fall Apart by Chinua Achebe was turned into a film of the same name—also known as Bullfrog in the Sun—directed by the award-winning German filmmaker and producer Hansjürgen Pohland and starring Princess Elizabeth of Tooro, Johnny Sekka, and Orlando Martins. In her biography, she wrote: "So I threw myself headlong into the role of Clara with genuine empathy and shortly afterwards, in the summer of 1970, I flew to Lagos in Nigeria to do the filming. Lagos was a revelation to me. I had been so used to seeing Asians and Europeans in Kampala and Nairobi running virtually everything that it impressed me to see Africans for once in control."

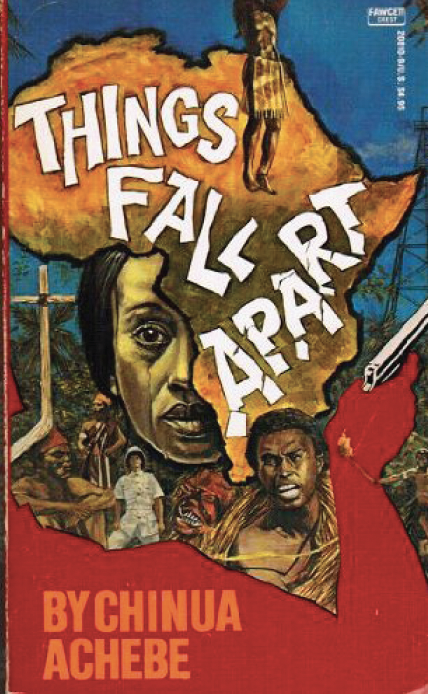
Cover of Things Fall Apart (1985) | Collage of film stills by Stephen Goldblatt

In 1965, Nigerian co-producer Francis Oladele founded Calpenny Nigeria Limited, the first film production company in Nigeria after independence. The American-German-Nigerian production Things Fall Apart was his second film after Kongi's Harvest. Things Fall Apart was considered lost for decades, until more than 2,000 stills by Stephen Goldblatt, production documents, correspondence, contemporary newspaper clippings, and more were found in a satellite storage of the Deutsche Kinemathek Berlin in 2019. This led to the development of an extensive research and digitization project on Nigerian film heritage, with exhibitions and screenings in Lagos, Kampala, Abidjan, Accra, and Atlanta, among other places. In his essay "Why 'Things Fall Apart' is still a very relevant Black film till this day", Lagos-based contemporary artist Mallam Mudi Yahaya describes the complex background of the production.

In 1971, Obote was overthrown by General Amin, and Elizabeth returned to Uganda. Amin's rule was arguably even more repressive than Obote's, with Amin executing and imprisoning many people. In 1974, Amin appointed Elizabeth minister of foreign affairs.

== Exile and return ==
In February 1975, Elizabeth escaped to Kenya, then to Vienna, then to London.

During her exile, the British press fixated on Elizabeth. In 1976, TIME magazine reported that she had "pulled a hat trick" when she won her libel cases against three separate publications: "Defeated were: the Daily Express, which had printed Amin's false accusation that the princess had indulged in a sexual encounter in a public lavatory at Paris' Orly Airport, the Sunday Telegraph, which wrongly claimed she was pregnant with Amin's baby and the Sun, which mistakenly put her name in the caption for a nude photo."

Elizabeth returned to Uganda to help with the country's first free national elections, which were won by Obote, who continued killing his enemies. Elizabeth and her lover, Prince Wilberforce Nyabongo, son of Prince Leo Sharp Ochaki, escaped to London in 1980 and married in 1981.

In 1984, Elizabeth played the part of Shaman in the Columbia Pictures film Sheena: Queen of the Jungle. Later, she wrote in her autobiography regarding the film: "It was badly written. But for me, Sheena expressed a certain truth, a certain reality, namely, that an indigenous culture, a way of life of a people, had suffered an assault at the hands of an alien one. The role of the Shaman, the defender of the indigenous culture in Sheena, had parallels with my own life and what had come to pass for Africa and our people."

Finally in 1985, Obote was overthrown and following a brief period of military rule, was replaced by Yoweri Museveni. In 1986, Elizabeth was appointed ambassador to the United States, a job she held until 1988. Later that year, Nyabongo, an aviation engineer, was killed in a plane crash at the age of 32.

Following the death of her husband, Elizabeth opted to leave public service and get involved in charity work, in addition to being an official guardian of her brother's son, Rukidi IV, who was born in 1992 and has been the reigning Tooro monarch since 1995. Following a period of service as Uganda's Ambassador to Germany and the Vatican, Elizabeth accepted an appointment as Uganda's High Commissioner to Nigeria.

== See also ==
- First female lawyers around the world
- Juliana Kanyomozi
- Kezia of Tooro
- Kings of Tooro

== Bibliography ==
- Hansen, Joyce. African Princess. New York: Hyperion, 2004
- Elizabeth of Toro. Elizabeth of Toro: The Odyssey of an African Princess. New York: Simon and Schuster.
