= Kyebambe Girls' Secondary School =

Kyebambe Girls Secondary School

Location
- Fort Portal, Kabarole District; Uganda
- 0.6466°N 30.2758°E

Information
- Type: Public Middle School and High School
- Motto: "Mukwekamba Tutaba Bagara"
- Established: 1910
- Athletics: soccer, track, tennis, volleyball, Netball
- Nickname: "The Star"

Kyebambe Girls Secondary School is a residential girls-only secondary school located in Fort Portal, Kabarole District in western Uganda. It was founded in 1910 under the Church of Uganda and named after the Omukama of Toro, Daudi Kasagama Kyebambe IV.

== Location ==
The school is situated a distance of approximately 2 Kilometres from the heart of Fort Portal town which is approximately 290 kilometres from Kampala, the capital and largest city of Uganda.

== Academics ==
Subjects offered at "O" Level include; Biology, Chemistry, Christian Religious Education, Commerce, Computer Studies, English Language and Literature, Fine Art, French, Geography, History, Mathematics, and Physics.

At "A" Level subjects offered are categorised into Arts and Sciences. The Arts subjects offered are; History, Economics, Divinity, French, Literature in English, Geography, Computer Studies and Fine Art. The Science subjects offered are Physics, Chemistry, Mathematics, Biology, Subsidiary Mathematics and General Paper which is compulsory.

== Notable alumni ==
- Princess Elizabeth of Toro
- Jane Kaberuka, writer of fiction and autobiography, and senior civil servant
- Barbara Kaija, Editor-In-Chief, Vision Group
- Joy Doreen Biira, Journalist and media personality.
- Jenifer Bamuturaki, Businesswoman and corporate executive. Chief Executive Officer of Uganda Airlines, since 2021.
