= Robert Kasande =

Ugandan public figure

- Born: Uganda
- Citizenship: Uganda
- Occupations: Geologist, Civil servant
- Years active: 2000 — present
- Known for: Management
- Title: Permanent Secretary in the Uganda Ministry of Justice and Constitutional Affairs

Robert Kasande, is a geologist and civil servant, in Uganda, who serves as the Permanent Secretary in the Uganda Ministry of Justice and Constitutional Affairs, since July 2021.

Before that, he was the Permanent Secretary in the Ministry of Energy and Mineral Development in Uganda, from August 2017 until July 2021. Immediately before that, he was the Director of the Petroleum Directorate, in the same ministry.

== Background and education ==
Kasande is a trained professional geologist.

== Career ==
Robert Kasande has served as a technocrat in the Ministry of Energy and Mineral Development in the past. Besides his duties as the director of the Petroleum Directorate in the Ministry, he also was the project manager for the oil refinery project. He is part of the team of Ugandan technocrats, examining ways on how Uganda and neighboring Tanzania can collaborate on exploring for oil in Tanzania and management of oil pipelines in Uganda.

In 2025, he praised the smoth transition of civil registration functions from the Uganda Registration Services Bureau (URSB) to the National Identification and Registration Authority (NIRA) as part of a government rationalisation initiative.

He also served as a Guest of Honour at Uganda's Africa Copyright and Collective Management Day celebrations, highlighting government support for intellectual property rights and creative industries.

== See also ==
- Energy in Uganda
- List of power stations in Uganda
- Irene Muloni
- Stephen Isabalija
- Government of Uganda
