= Flavia Munaaba =

Ugandan politician

Flavia Nabugera Munaaba is a Ugandan politician. She is the current State Minister for the Environment in the Ugandan Cabinet. She was appointed to that position on 27 May 2011. She replaced Jessica Eriyo, who was dropped from the Cabinet. On account of being a cabinet minister, Flavia Munaaba is also an ex officio Member of Parliament.
