= Rukidi IV of Tooro =

King of Tooro from 1995 to 2026

Rukidi IV
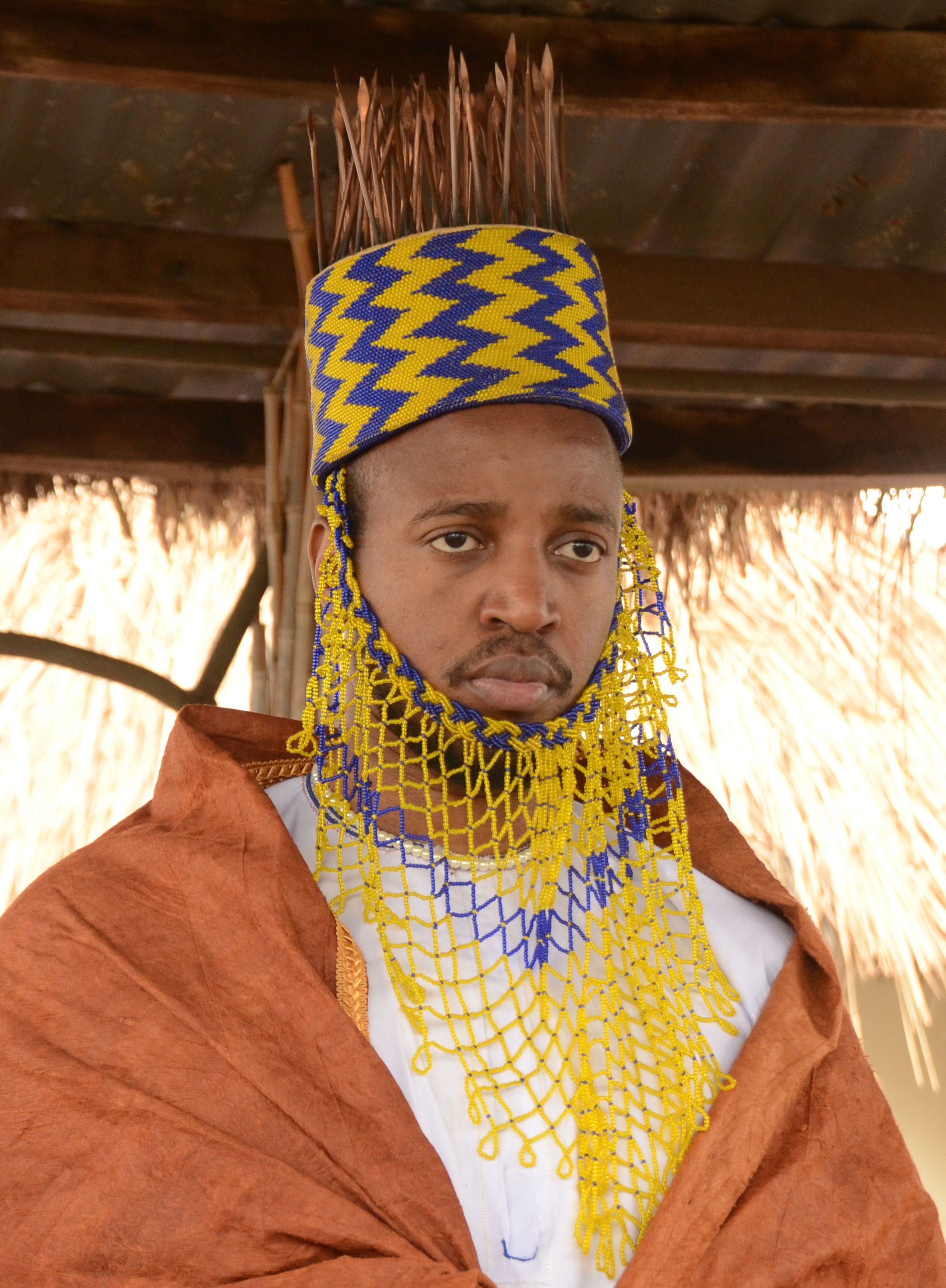
- Rukidi in 2024

Omukama of Tooro
- Reign: 26 August 1995 – 27 August 2026
- Coronation: 12 September 1995
- Predecessor: Olimi III
- Successor: Nyabongo I
- Born: 16 April 1992; Uganda
- Died: 27 August 2026 (aged 34); United States
- Burial: 12 September 2026; Fort Portal
- Issue: one son
Names
- Oyo Nyimba Kabamba Iguru Rukidi
- Dynasty: Biito-boyo
- Father: Olimi III
- Mother: Omugo Best Kemigisa Akiiki
- Religion: Anglican

Rukidi IV (Oyo Nyimba Kabamba Iguru Rukidi, Tooro: [óːjo ɲíːmba kaβáːmba igúɾu ɾukídi]; 16 April 1992 – 27 August 2026), also known as King Oyo of Tooro, was the 13th Omukama of the Kingdom of Tooro in Uganda from 1995 until his death in 2026. At the time of his accession, Oyo was three years old, making him the world's youngest reigning monarch. He was the son of Omukama Patrick David Matthew Kaboyo Rwamuhokya Olimi III and Omugo Best Kemigisa.

== Biography ==
After the death of his father King Olimi III in 1995, Oyo Nyimba Kabamba Rukidi IV assumed the role of king during his toddler years. At 2 a.m. on 12 September 1995, a week after Olimi III's burial, the rituals to proclaim Rukidi IV as king began. Rukidi IV became the youngest modern monarch at the age of three. The rituals included a mock battle at the palace entrance fought between enemy forces of a "rebel" prince and the royal army, and a test of Rukidi IV's divine right to the throne, in which the Omusuuga (head of the royal clan) called on the gods to strike the prince dead if he was not of royal blood. On passing the test, Rukidi IV was permitted to sound the Nyalebe, a sacred Chwezi drum, as his forefathers had done.

At 4 a.m., Rukidi IV was crowned amidst a jubilant crowd and entered the Karuziika palace as the new ruler of the Kingdom of Tooro. He was served his first meal as king, which consisted of millet dough. The cultural rituals (Emirwa y'Obuhangwa) were followed by a religious ceremony presided over by Eustace Kamanyire of Fort Portal based Ruwenzori. President Yoweri Museveni attended the coronation celebrations and paid tribute to Rukidi IV. Rukidi IV was the Omukama, which means "King," and Rukirabasaija, which means "the greatest of men." Although he was considered the sovereign leader of the Batooro, Rukidi IV's power was limited to cultural duties. His full title and name was Rukirabasaija Omukama Oyo Nyimba Kabamba-Iguru Rukidi IV.

In October 2013, Rukidi IV graduated from the University of Winchester with a bachelor's degree.

Three regents were charged with overseeing Rukidi IV's growth into the role of king and with handling the cultural affairs of the kingdom during the king's childhood and youth. At the time of his coronation, the regents included Prince James Mugenyi, Princess Elizabeth Bagaaya and lastly Queen Mother Best Kemigisa. Muammar Gaddafi was a patron of the Tooro Kingdom with close ties to the royal family. In 2001, the nine-year-old Rukidi IV named Gaddafi the "defender" of the kingdom and invited him to attend the sixth coronation anniversary celebrations in 2001. Gaddafi had made donations to the kingdom, helping pay for refurbishments to the palace in Fort Portal.

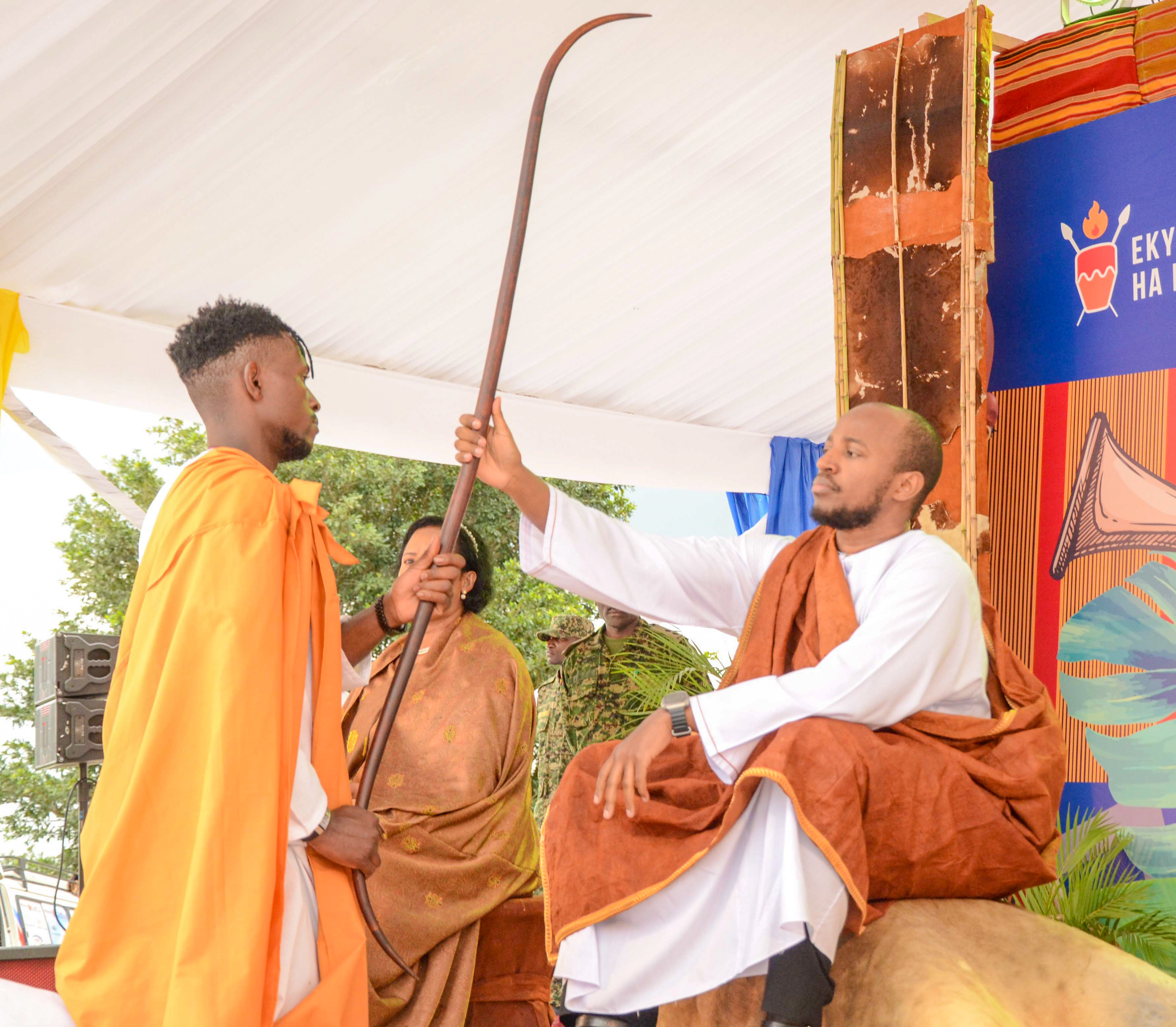
Rukidi IV blessing the royal spear presented to him, in 2024

=== Death ===
On the evening of 27 August 2026, reports began circulating widely on social media in Uganda claiming that Rukidi IV had died in the United States. The reports followed earlier rumours about his health, which had been dismissed by Tooro Kingdom officials. The kingdom's prime minister confirmed that the king was in critical condition and called on Ugandans and his subjects to pray for him. At around 10:00 p.m. that night (EAT), Rukidi was pronounced dead while receiving treatment for cancer in the United States. He was 34. Tooro's prime minister Calvin Armstrong Rwomiire Akiiki called the death an "immeasurable loss" to the royal family and the people of Tooro. Government minister Margaret Annet Muhanga later announced that one million trees would be planted during the mourning period in his honour.

Following his death, his mother, Best Kemigisa, and his sister Ruth Komuntale citing a purported 2022 will in which Rukidi IV reportedly named a biological son as his heir, disputed the selection of Edward Rukidi Kijanangoma as his successor.

== Environmental legacy ==
Rukidi campaigned on environmental conservation in the later years of his reign, including a "Save River Mpanga Now" campaign addressing pollution and siltation of the Mpanga River, which supplies Fort Portal's water and flows through Kibale National Park to Lake George. In 2019, amid local concern over pollution of the Mpanga River, Rukidi joined community efforts to desilt the river and remove solid waste, taking part in the clean-up himself.

In 2019, Rukidi was named one of the Global Top 100 Most Influential People of African Descent.

Rukidi IV of Tooro Born: 16 April 1992 Died: 27 August 2026
Regnal titles
Preceded by Olimi III of Tooro	Omukama of Tooro; 12 September 1995 – 27 August 2026	Succeeded by Nyabongo I
