= Fort Portal =

City in Tooro, Western Uganda

Fort Portal Kabarole
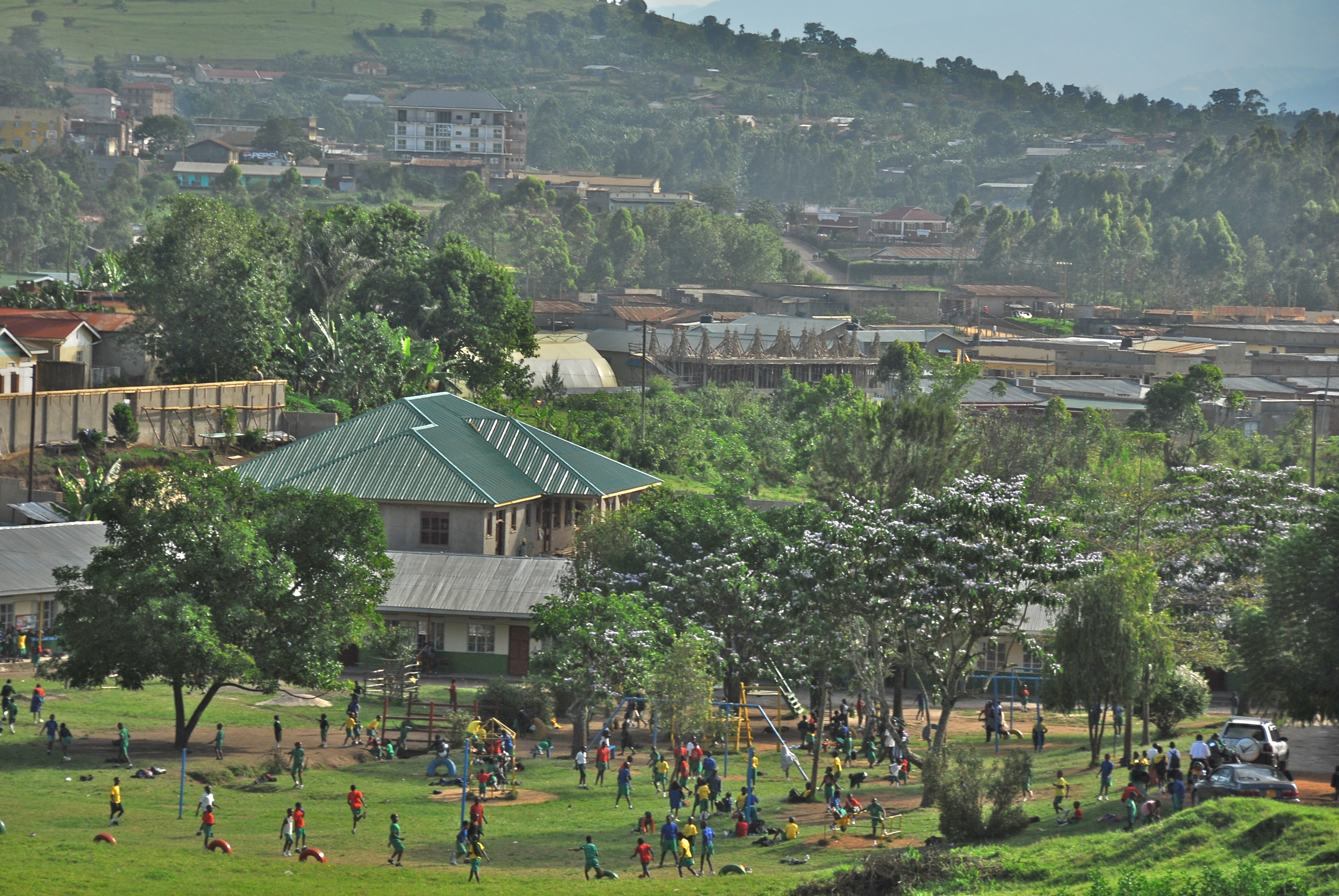

- Location in Uganda
- Coordinates: 00°39′16″N 30°16′28″E
- Country: Uganda
- Region: Western Region
- Sub-region: Tooro sub-region
- District: Kabarole District

Government
  - Mayor: Asaba Ruyonga
- Elevation: 4,997 ft (1,523 m)

Population (2024 Census)
  - Total: 137,549

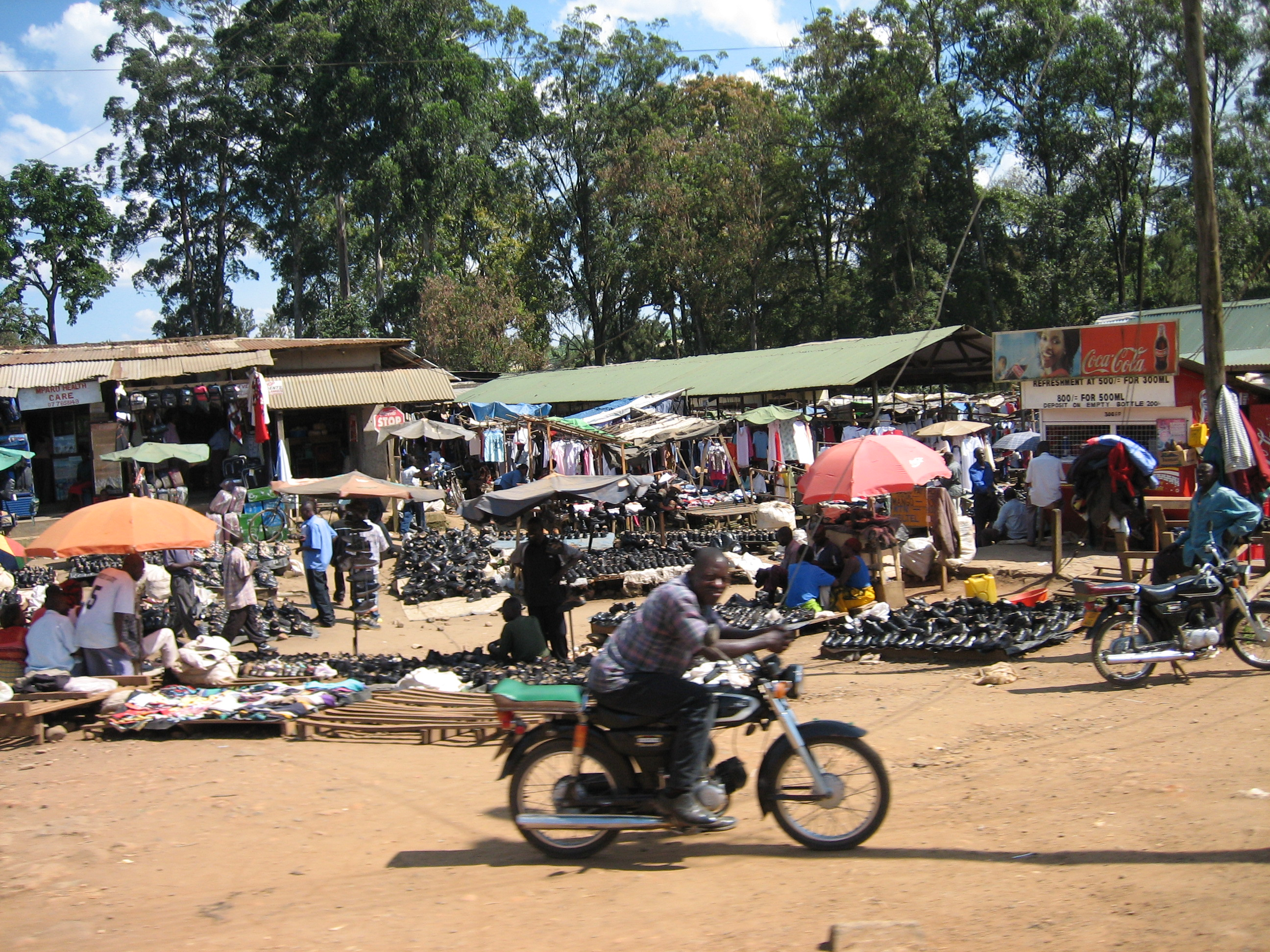
Mpanga market, Fort Portal

Fort Portal, formerly Kabarole (lit. 'let them see'), is a city located in the Western Region of Uganda. It is the seat of both Kabarole District and historically of the Tooro Kingdom.

== Etymology ==
Fort Portal was named after British diplomat Sir Gerald Portal, as it was where his base was.

== Location ==
Fort Portal in Kabarole District is located approximately 296 kilometres (184 mi) by road, west of Kampala, Uganda's capital and largest city, on an all-tarmac two-lane highway. The geographical coordinates of Fort Portal City are 0°39'16.0"N, 30°16'28.0"E (latitude: 0.654444; longitude: 30.274444). Fort Portal is situated at an average elevation of 1,523 metres (4,997 ft) above sea level.

== City status ==
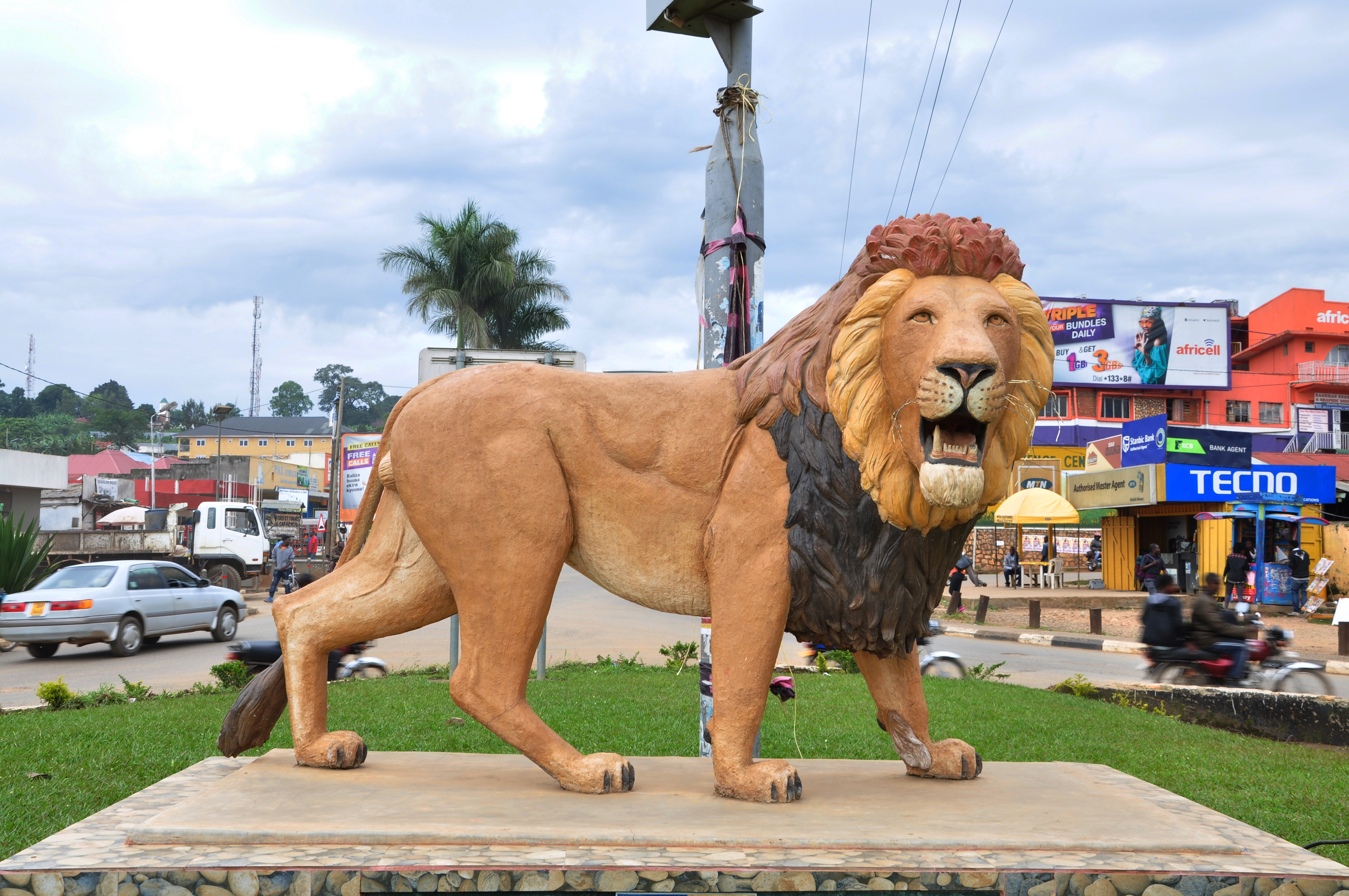
Lion statue in Fort Portal town

On 1 July 2020, Fort Portal was elevated from municipality to a "tourism city" status. In 2019, in preparation for the award of city status, Ford Portal annexed several surrounding neighborhoods and sub-counties, including Karago, Ibaale Parish, Burungu Parish, Karambi sub-county, Bukuku sub-county, and parts of Busoro sub-county.

== Population ==
According to the 2002 national census, the population of Fort Portal was about 41,000. In 2010, the Uganda Bureau of Statistics (UBOS) estimated the population at 46,300. In 2011, UBOS estimated the population at 47,100. In August 2014, the national population census put the population at 54,275. In 2020 UBOS estimated the mid-year population of the city as 60,800. The population agency calculated that the population of the city grew at an average rate of 2.12 percent annually between 2014 and 2020.

Historical population
Year	Pop.	±%
2002	41,000	—
2010	46,300	+12.9%
2011	47,100	+1.7%
2014	54,275	+15.2%
2020	60,800	+12.0%

== Healthcare ==
Fort Portal is home to three hospitals. Fort Portal Regional Referral Hospital, a 300-bed public hospital administered by the Uganda Ministry of Health is the largest. The next-largest is Holy Family Virika Hospital, a private hospital with a bed capacity of 155, owned by the Roman Catholic Diocese of Fort Portal. The smallest of the hospitals is the 100-bed Kabarole Missionary Hospital, a community hospital administered by the Church of Uganda, originally founded by John Edward Church of the Church Mission Society.

== Education ==
The city houses three institutions of higher learning. The main campus of Mountains of the Moon University, previously a private university, but now a public university, is located in the city center. Also located within the city is the main campus of Uganda Pentecostal University, a private university affiliated with the Pentecostal Movement. A new university, the Fins Medical University, was established in the city in 2018. St. Mary's Minor Seminary, a Catholic secondary school for prospective Catholic priests, is also located in Fort Portal.

== Notable people ==
- Beenie Gunter: dancehall artist
- Juliana Kanyomozi: singer
- Margaret Blick Kigozi: commonly known as Maggie Kigozi; medical doctor, business consultant, educator, and sportswoman; born here in 1950
- Nobel Mayombo (1965–2007): brigadier general in the UPDF, lawyer and legislator
- Kayanja Muhanga: lieutenant general in the UPDF; commander of the Land Forces of the UPDF since October 2022
- Andrew Mwenda: journalist
- Edward Rugumayo: politician, diplomat, author, academic and environmentalist
- Sylvia Rwabogo: journalist and politician; served as the District Woman Representative for Kabarole District, in the 10th Parliament (2016–2021)
- Beatrice Birungi Kiraso: Academician, diplomat, politician
- Oyo Nyimba Kabambaiguru: King of Tooro
- Robert Kasande: Permanent Secretary Ministry to the Judiciary
- William Byaruhanga: Lawyer, former Attorney General of Uganda, businessman

== See also ==
- Tooro sub-region
- List of cities and towns in Uganda
