= Kabarole District =

- District
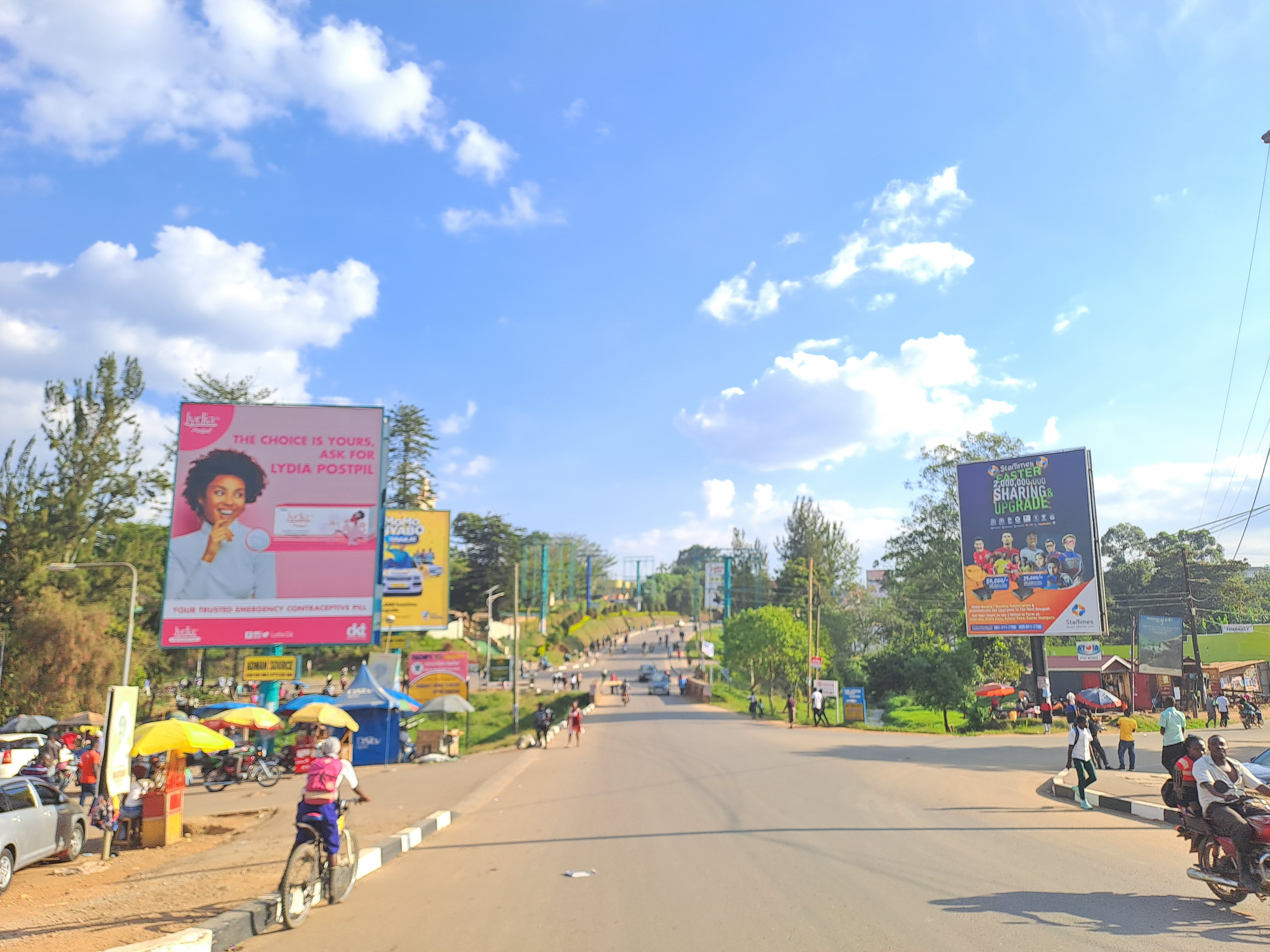

- District location in Uganda
- Coordinates: 00°36′N 30°18′E
- Country: Uganda
- Region: Western Uganda
- Sub-region: Toro sub-region
- Capital: Busoro town council proporsed after elevating Fort Portal Municipality to a City on 1 July 2020 hence separating it from Kabarole district

Government
  - LC5 Chairperson: Sir Rwabuhinga Richard

Area
  - Total: 1,814 km^{2} (700 sq mi)

Population (2012 Estimate)
  - Total: 415,600
  - Density: 229.1/km^{2} (593.4/sq mi)
- Time zone: UTC+3 (EAT)
- Website: www.kabarole.go.ug

Kabarole District is a district in Western Uganda. Kabarole District is part of the Tooro Kingdom. Its main town was Fort Portal before 1 July 2020 when it was elevated to a city, separating it from Kabarole district. The new Kabarole district seat is proporsed in Busoro Town Council. Kabarole remains with only one county (Burahya). Bunyangabu county was curved out to form Bunyangabu district in 2017. Fort Portal Municipality constituency became Fort Portal City in 2020 with an independent local Government.

== Location ==
Kabarole District is bordered by Ntoroko District to the north, Kibaale District to the northeast, Kyenjojo District to the east, Kamwenge District to the southeast, Bunyangabu District (which was formerly a county of Kabarole District) to the south, the Democratic Republic of the Congo to the southwest and Bundibugyo District, across the Rwenzori Mountains to the west. Fort Portal, the 'chief town' (Uganda's Tourism City) in the district, lies approximately 320 kilometres (200 mi), by road, west of Kampala, the capital city of Uganda. The coordinates of the district are: 00 36N, 30 18E (Latitude:0.6000; Longitude:30.3000). The surface area is 1,814 km2.

== Overview ==
Kabarole Districts consists of one city and one county:

(a) Fort Portal City and (b) Buryahya County. Bunyangabu District which was one of the three counties of Kabarole District got a district started effective 1 July 2017 leaving Kabarole District with just two counties.

== Population ==
In 1991, the national census put the population of the district at about 299,600. During the 2002 national census, the district population was about 357,000. In 2012, the population of Kabarole District was estimated at 415,600.

== Ethnicities ==
The Batooro, Batuku, and Basongora ethnicities constitute the majority of the population. The Bakiga, Bakonjo and the Bamba form the minority of the population. The primary language spoken in the district is Rutooro.

== Economic activities ==
Subsistence agriculture and animal husbandry are the main economic activities in Kabarole District.

The crops grown in Kabarole District include:

- Soybeans
- Onions/Obutunguru
- Cassava/Muhoogo
- Bananas/Ebyenju
- Matooke (green bananas)/Ebitooke
- Maize/Ebicooli
- Beans/Ebihimba
- Sorghum/Omugusa
- Potatoes/Ebilaya
- Sweet potatoes/Ebitakuli
- Groundnuts/Ebinyobwa
- Millet/Oburo
- Yams/Ebinyonga
- Coffee/Omwani
- Tea/Amajani
- Pineapples/Enanasi
- Tomatoes/Enyanya
- Cabbage

Livestock is the second economic activity practiced in the district. In 2005, there were approximately 18,695 heads of exotic/cross bred cattle, 35,199 indigenous cattle, 75,897 goats, 6,442 sheep, 12,162 pigs, 9,776 exotic/cross bred chicken, 131,255 local chicken, 4,467 ducks, 1,040 turkeys, 326 guinea fowl, and 122 geese in the district.

Commercial fishing occurs on about 30 of the 52 crater lakes, scattered in Kabarole District. The main fish species harvested from the crater lakes is the small Haplochromines (Nkejje). Fishing, mainly of Protopterus aethiopicus (Lung fish), is also carried out in a number of wetlands. Some fishing also goes on in the area rivers including:

- River Kayagi
- River Kaija
- River Kahomba
- River Sogohi
- River Muzizi
- River Rwimi
- River Kakoko
- River Kakule
- River Kabago
- River Kizikibi
- River Yerya

Aquaculture is practiced with increasing frequency in the district, and in 2005, there were over 300 fish ponds stocked with tilapia and mirror carp species.

== See also ==
- Fort Portal
- Toro Kingdom
- Toro sub-region
- Western Region, Uganda
- Districts of Uganda
