= Songora people =

Ethnic group of Central Africa

Songora
Total population
- 15,897 (2014 census)

Regions with significant populations
- Uganda: 15,897 (2014 census)

Languages
- Rusongora and English

Religion
- Christianity, Islam and Songora religion

Related ethnic groups
- Bantu peoples

The Songora or Shongora (pl. Basongora, sing. Musongora; also known as "Bachwezi", "Chwezi", or "Huma") are a traditionally pastoralist people of the Great Lakes region of Central Africa located in Western Region, Uganda and Eastern Democratic Republic of the Congo. They have distinctive customs and speak Rusongora, a Bantu language that is similar to Rutoro, Runyoro and Runyankole. Basongora originally occupied the Nyakasongora area of Bunyoro-Kitara (present-day Nakasongola district). Since the county's induction into Buganda under the 1900 agreement), many Basongora emigrated south-west to southern Bunyoro, Toro, Rwenzori and northern Ankole). Their population in Uganda was reported at numbering 15,897 people in the 2014 census. Although various community estimates put their population at around 40,000 and 50,000 people. Some Basongora also live in Eastern Congo.

The colonial and neo-colonial governments in Central Africa instituted programs to encourage the Basongora to abandon their traditional lifestyle, and most of the territory traditionally owned by the Songora community has been appropriated for use as national parks or has been settled and occupied by other communities, notably the Batoro and Bakonzo. Also Songora territory has been partitioned into several districts and is distributed across Uganda and Congo.

The traditional lifestyle of the Basongora is notable for its adaptation to dry savanna and scrublands, as well as mountainous terrain.

== Overview ==
The Basongora are a mixed Nilotic/Bantu group in East and Central Africa, traditionally residing in the foothills and plains at the floor of the western arm of the Great Rift Valley and the hills around the base of the Rwenzori Mountain Range. The Songora traditional economy was largely based on cattle-rearing, as well as salt-manufacture and trade in iron. The political organization of the Songora was a form confederacy of several states united by a parliament called Muhabuzi, and a constitutional monarchy led by a trimviate that consisted of an empress dowager (Omu'Gabe'kati), a female ruler (Omu'Go), and a male ruler (Omu'Kama). The confederacy emerged from a single Songora state that dates back to the 12th century consisted of several provinces including Kisaka-Makara, Kitagwenda, Bugaya, Bunyaruguru and Kiyanja.

== History ==
According to their own oral history, the Basongora emerged from the ancient empires of Shenzi/Chwezi. The traditional homeland of the Basongora is the region centred in the foothills and plains that surround the Rutshuru and Rwenzori mountain ranges.

Some of the most notable Songora monarchs include Kyomya Bwachali who died around 1850, and was the maternal grandfather of King Ntare V of Nkore kingdom. The last precolonial King of Busongora was King Kasigano. He was deposed in 1906 by the British, ostensively for his having sought to ally himself with the Belgians in the Congo. Busongora was then partitioned and divided between the Congo and Uganda Protectorate, and the portions that fell within Uganda were further sub-divided into several districts, all of which were then annexed to the kingdoms of Toro and Nkore. The Kingdom of Rwenzururu formed in the later part of the 20th century on the territory of Busongora.

In 1931 there was an outbreak of rinderpest that decimated the cattle populations of the Nyakatonzi Basongora, forcing them to disperse to other areas of Uganda and the eastern Congo. Basongora believe the outbreak began as a result of a virulent drugs vaccination program started by the colonial government. The biggest group that fled to the Congo did not return to the area until 1964 due to the strife caused by the Mulele rebellion there.

In 1925, Parc Nationale des Virunga was created by the Belgian colonial authorities encompassing areas of the chiefdom of Kiyanja (of the Bamooli clan), Kakunda (now called Kyavinyonge), Rwemango, Makara, Kashansha and Bugaya among others and pressure to protect the adjoining ecosystem in Uganda led to the establishment of game reserves around Lake George (Known as Rweishamba by Basongora) and Lake Edward (locally known as Rweru) between 1906 and 1950. Several name changes followed and Kazinga National Park was gazetted in 1952 and in 1954 it was renamed Queen Elizabeth National Park by the colonial administration. This left only limited land for the pastoral Basongora. In 1940s the colonial government introduced cotton growing in Busongora. By coincidence, the best soil and suitable climate for cotton growing was in the Bwengo area and other plains of the Busongora County in Kasese. Although some remained in the park – albeit illegally, thousands of others moved across the border with their herds into the Virunga National Park in the Congo.

Between the 1940s and 1950s, the cotton growing enterprise lured particularly the Bakonjo from the highlands to the lowlands. By 1962, the Rwenzururu Freedom Movement had also displaced some Bakonjo from the mountains, forcing them to settle in parts of Busongora that had not been gazetted as protected areas. In 1962 Basongora started returning to their original areas only to find that the Toro Development Company (TDC) that wound up in 1970, had leased some of their land, and was running projects such as the Mubuku Irrigation Scheme.

When the cotton industry plummeted in the 1970s, the general Ugandan public lost interest in cotton, thus giving the Basongora pastoralists a chance to resettle in vast plains of Nyakatonzi. When the NRM government introduced the decentralization policy, it was hijacked by the extremist fringe of the Bakonjo and was seen as an opportunity to displace and subjugate the Basongora. This coincided with peak cotton production between 1987 and 1989 and it is in the same period that Basongora were displaced from their ancestral lands of Bukangara and Rweihingo.

== Monarchy ==
On 12 May 2012 Basongora revived their ancient kingdom that had been dismembered and abolished during the colonial occupation one hundred years prior. On 1 July 2012, the Songora installed Bwebale Ivan Rutakirwa Rwigi IV as the king of "BuSongora Kingdom", and claimed twenty sub-counties of Uganda as their territory. The sub-counties include: Muhokya, Bugoye, Nyakatonzi, Katwe, Karusandara, Mubuku, Ibuga, Hamukungu, Kasenyi, Busunga, and Katunguru, among others. The kingdom also claimed their ancestral areas of Shema, Bunyaruguru and Kitagwenda in Uganda, as well as Virunga National Park in the Congo, as part of the kingdom. King Rwigi IV died on 28 April 2015.

=== List of Monarchs ===
NB:

- In Busongora, Omukama is the title of King Regnant, Kandake is the title of Queen Regnant, and Omugo is the title of Chief Female Consort.
- The dates are approximate for most of the early rulers.
- This list of rulers includes the rulers of the Chwezi Empire before its dissolution.

List of Busongora rulers:

No.	Name	Reign Dates	Years of rule	Notes
Tembuzi or Shenzi Dynasty
1	Twale	630–650	20	
2	Hangi	650–670	20	
3	Nyamenge	670–700	30	
4	Ira	700–725	25	Son of Hangi.
5	Kazoba	725–750	25	Brother of Ira.
6	Kabangere	750–775	25	
7	Ruhanga [a.k.a. Rubanga or Rubanda]	775–800	25	His consort was Nyabagabe.
8	Nkya I	800–825	25	Brother of Ruhanda.
9	Nkya II	825–850	25	Son of Nkya I.
10	Kakama	850–875	25	Son of Nkya II.
11	Baba	875–900	25	Son of Kakama.
12	Kamuli	900–925	25	
13	Nsheka	925–950	25	
14	Kudidi	950–990	40	Empress. She is known to Ethiopians as Gudit.
15	Ntozi	990–1000	10	
16	Nyakahongerwa	1000–1025	25	Empress.
17	Mukonko	1025–1050	25	
18	Ngonzaki Bitahinduka	1050–1075	25	
19	Kogyere I Rusija-Miryango	1075–1085	10	Empress. Daughter of Ngonzaki Bitahinduka. Abdicated.
20	Ishaza Nyakikooto Rugambanabato	1085–1090	5	Nephew of Kogyere I.
21	Bukuku	1090	–	Courtier who usurped the throne. Rebellion by Kogyere I leads to founding of the BuSongora Kingdom.
Chwezi Dynasty
1	Kogyere I Rusija-Miryango	1090–1120	10	Empress. Second reign.
2	Kogyere II	1120–1130	10	Empress.
3	Kyomya I kya Isiimbwa	1130–1140	10	
4	Mugarra I	1140–1150	10	
5	Ndahura I kya Rubumbo	1150–1160	10	
6	Mulindwa	1160–1170	10	
7	Wamara Bbala Bwigunda	1170–1200	30	
8	Kyomya II Rurema	1200–1210	10	
9	Kagoro	1210–1220	10	
10	Kakara-ka-Shagama	1220–1250	30	
11	Njunaki Kamaranga	1250–1280	30	Empress. The empire was dissolved into several states.
12	Shagama-rwa-Njunaki	1280–1300	20	The first king of the Busongora Kingdom after the dissolution of the Chwezi Empire.
13	Wahaiguru Rukuba-Ntondo	1300–1310	10	
14	Kateboha	1310–1330	20	
15	Nyakahuma	1330–1375	45	Queen Regnant.
16	Kirobozi	1375–1400	25	
17	Mugarra II wa Kirobozi	1400–1420	20	
18	Buyonga bwa Kirobozi	1420–1430	10	
19	Kyomya III	1430–1460	30	
20	Nkome	1460–1485	25	
21	Ihiingo	1485–1500	15	
22	Goro	1500–1525	25	
23	Kasheshe	1525–1550	25	
24	Kazoba	1550–1575	25	
25	Nyabongo I	1575–1600	25	
26	Makora	1600–1625	25	
27	Nyabongo II Kikundi Nyakwirigita	1625–1655	30	
28	Mugonga Rutegwankondo	1655–1685	30	
29	Kitami kya Nyawera	1685–1725	40	Queen Regnant.
30	Rwigi I Wakoli	1725–1730	5	
31	Buremu I Rushoita	1730–1740	10	
32	Kantunguru	1740–1750	10	Queen Regnant.
33	Kyokoora	1750–1775	25	
34	Mairanga ga Kyokoora	1775–1800	25	
–	Interregnum	1800–1825	25	
35	Kyomya IV Bwachali bwa Mairanga	1825–1850	25	
36	Kikamba	1850–1860	10	
37	Rwigi II Kyeramaino Rweshakaramyambi	1860–1880	20	
38	Bulemu II Kigwamabere	1880–1886	6	
39	Kogyere III Ikamiro	1886–1889	3	Queen Regnant.
40	Rwigi III Mugasa Kakintule	1889–1891	2	
41	Rutairuka	1891	–	
42	Njugangya Katurumba	1891	–	
43	Kuriafire	1891–1894	3	
44	Kaihura	1894–1901	7	
45	Kasigano	1901–1907	6	Last king to rule before the monarchy was abolished by the British.
–	Interregnum	1907–2012	–	
46	Rwigi IV Bwebale Rutakirwa	12 May 2012–28 April 2015	3	
47	Ndahura II Imara Kashagama Ruguuvu	29 April–1 May 2015	2 days	Nephew of Rwigi IV.
48	Kyomya V Bwebale Rubyahi	1 May–27 November 2015	6 months	Son of Rwigi IV. Deposed.
–	Ndahura II Imara Kashagama Ruguuvu	28 November 2015–present	–	Second reign.
–	Robert Bwebale Kagyenda	8 January 2016–present	–	Acting regent. Brother of Kyomba V.

== Personalities ==
Other notable figures in ancient Songora history include at least two empresses; Nyakahuma, and Kitami rwa Nyawera. The Queen Kiboga of Nkore was a Songora. She was also mother to Nkore's King Ntare V, and sister to King Kaihura of the Songora. Princess Kantunguru of Nkore was also a Songora and has a town named after her in western Uganda. Many of the rulers of states of Rwanda, Mpororo, Bunyoro, Toro and Nkore chose their wives from among the Songora. Other notable Songora kings in the pre-colonial era include: Kyomya III father of the founder of Bunyoro - Rukidi Mpuga; Bulemu I Rushoita, Rwigi II Kyeramaino Rweshakaramyambi, Nyabongo II Kikundi Nyakwirigita, Ihiingo, Goro, Nyabongo I, Kasheshe (for whom the municipality/city of Kasese is named), Rutairuka, Makora, and Kaihura.

During the post colonial era, beginning in the early 1960s, the Songora didn't formally have rulers recognized by the central governments in Uganda and Congo/Zaire. However, there are several notable Songora personalities in various fields that have played a key role in maintaining the presence of the community. Among them are Timothy Bazarrabusa-an educationalist who served as Uganda's first High Commissioner to London, Amon Bazira, who served as Director of Intelligence, as Chair of the Security & Defence Parliamentary Committee, and as State Minister of Lands, Waters and Mineral resources in Uganda from 1981 to 1985, General James Kazini was commander of the Uganda People's Defence Force, Lt. Col. Jet Mwebaze a commander within the UPDF. Other notable Basongora include John Musinguzi Rujoki, Commissioner-General of Uganda Revenue Authority and Board Chairperson of National Information Technology Authority (NITA-U), the Noble Sirasi Kisankara, the prophet Yombo Yowasi, the Rwabukurukuru family, Baguma Sam Twebaze, Isimbwa David Mulindwa, Wilson Isingoma, Boaz Kafuda, Prof. Mbabi-Katana, Enoch Rukidi, Kosia Mpazi, the Rwamashonje family, the Rubuubi family, the Rwakashamba family, Yefesi Saiba, and Ananais Mulumba, Isimbwa Kiiza Kagoro Mayor Katwe-Kabatoro Town Council 2006 to 2016.

== Culture ==
Songora society is strongly pastoral. Cattle motifs form an important part of the language. Cattle have an important place in the imagination, poetry and art of the community. The disciplines required in the management of cattle have a great import impact on the diet, health and appearance of the Songora. Age determines seniority in social relations, and men and women are considered equal. The Songora are generally monogamous. Traditionally the Songora were monotheistic.

The Songora reacted to a tetanus epidermic in the 1880s by requiring everyone in the community to remove the four front lower teeth, as a means to force-feed medication to victims of the disease. When the epidermic ended, many Songora continued with the teeth removal even though it was no longer necessary in the era of syringes and other means of treatment.

In recent decades the traditional Songora territory has yielded interesting artefacts that are of great value to general human history. The Ishango Bone is one of the items that was found in Songora territory. While the Eastern Arm of the Great Rift Valley located in Ethiopia, Kenya and Tanzania has yielded the greatest amount of ancient human fossils, the northern portion of the Western Arm of the Rift Valley - home of the Songora - remains largely unexplored, although it appears to contain important fossils. The lack of exploration has been caused by the high level of war and civil conflict in the region.
