= Ekyaghanda of Rwenzururu =

Parliament of Rwenzururu Ekyaghanda (Konzo)
- Coat of arms of Rwenzururu

Type
- Type: Unicameral

Leadership
- Speaker: Hassan Jauwakali Bakulu

Structure
- Seats: 300
- Political groups: His Majesty's Government (48): Prime Minister and Ministers (36); Privy Councillors (12); Territorial representatives (252): Chiefs (252); Presiding Officer: Speaker (1)

Elections
- Voting system: Appointment by the Omusinga

Meeting place
- Parliament House, Buhikira Palace; Kasese, Uganda

The Ekyaghanda (often simply referred to as Parliament in English) is the legislature of the Kingdom of Rwenzururu.

The Ekyaghanda traditionally convened in the Parliament House at the Buhikira Palace in Kasese. Following the destruction of Parliament House during the Kasese clashes in 2016, the Ekyghanda has met in provisional meeting spaces.

The assembly is appointed by the Omusinga and consists of members of the cabinet, the privy council, and chiefs representing the communities across the kingdom. The Ekyaghanda is charged with legislating by-laws, legislating on cultural matters, passing the kingdom's yearly budget and with scrutinising the royal government, but it is prevented from legislating on political matters.
