= Prime Minister of Rwenzururu =

- Omulerembera (Konjo)
- Coat of Arms of Rwenzururu

- Flag of Rwenzururu
- Incumbent; Benson Kule Baritazale since 20 April 2025
- Residence: Kasese, Uganda
- Appointer: The Omusinga
- Formation: 2009
- First holder: Yolamu Mulima

The prime minister of Rwenzururu, known locally as the omulerembera, is the highest administrative post within the government of the chiefdom of Rwenzururu in Uganda. The appointment is the prerogative of the monarch.

== List of prime ministers ==
1. 30 June 1962 – 2 September 1966 (or 1971): Samwiri Mukirania, prime minister under Isaya Mukirania Kibanzanga; retired and died in 2010.
2. 13 March 1972 – 1976: Yolamu Mulima, first prime minister under Charles Mumbere# 1976 – 15 August 1982: Yeremiya Muhongya
3. 3 June 2009 – 2 March 2012: Constatine Bwambale
4. 2 March 2012 – 12 October 2012: Loyce Biira Bwambale, acting# 2 October 2012 – 16 October 2013: Henry Kandabu, suspended from 20 May 2013
5. 20 May 2013 – 16 October 2013: Ivan Syauswa, acting# 16 October 2013 – ????: Noah Nzaghale
6. 23 July 2014 – 31 March 2015: Enock Jimmy Muhindo, acting for Noah Nzaghale
7. ???? – present: Johnson Thembo Kitsumbire
8. April 2025 - present: Benson Kule Baritazale
