= Kasese clashes =

Armed clashes in western Uganda

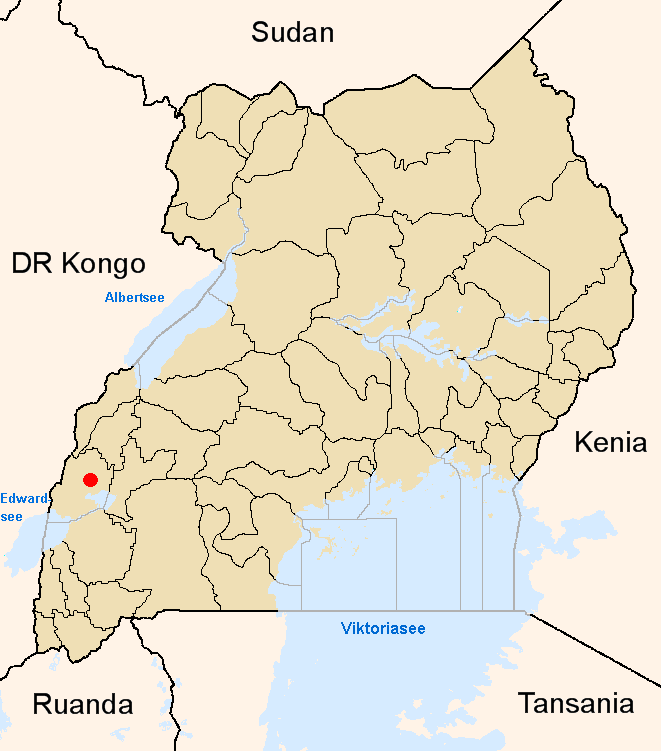
- Location of Kasese in Uganda
Date	26–27 November 2016
Location	Kasese, Uganda
Result	Ugandan victory

Belligerents
Uganda	Rwenzururu

Commanders and leaders
Yoweri Museveni; Peter Elwelu	Charles Mumbere (POW); Johnson Thembo Kitsumbire (POW)

Units involved
Uganda People's Defence Force; Uganda National Police	Rwenzururu Royal Guards

Casualties and losses
16 killed	87 killed; 180+ arrested; 167 surrendered
- Total: 103 killed (official count); 156+ killed (HRW estimate)

Violence erupted on 26 November 2016 in the town of Kasese, the capital of the Ugandan Kingdom of Rwenzururu, when Ugandan police raided the government offices of the Rwenzururu kingdom, killing eight Rwenzururian royal guards and arresting two others. According to the government of Uganda, the raid was in response to militant attacks on police posts in the region two weeks earlier, allegedly perpetrated by the royal guards.

On the next day, Uganda's armed forces and police raided the Rwenzururu royal palace after the expiration of an ultimatum issued by the Ugandan government, resulting in the deaths of 87 royal guards and 16 policemen. Following the raids, the Omusinga (king) of Rwenzururu, Charles Mumbere, was arrested and charged with murder.

== Background ==
The Rwenzururu region is inhabited by the Konjo and Amba peoples, who have fought for secession from the Tooro Kingdom since 1962 under the movement known as "Rwenzururu". The violence reached a height in 1963 and 1964, when Tooro soldiers massacred many Konjo and Amba civilians as they sought control over the lower valleys. The Ugandan army intervened against the separatists, doing such significant damage to the movement was suppressed for some time. The movement however, achieved fame through a local folk epic and remained relevant, eventually gaining autonomy in 1982 and official government recognition as a kingdom in 2008.

After Rwenzururu was recognised by the Ugandan government, violence between the Konjo and Amba peoples became more prevalent, as the Bakonjo generally support the opposition whilst the Baamba generally support the central government. In February and April 2016, violence erupted between the two communities due to disputed local election results and political infighting, leading to the deaths of at least 30 people.

== Clashes ==
The Uganda National Police raided the government offices of the Rwenzururu kingdom on 26 November 2016, killing eight Rwenzururian royal guards and arresting two others. According to the government of Uganda, the raid was in response to militant attacks on police posts in the region two weeks earlier, allegedly perpetrated by the royal guards.

The next day, on 27 November 2016, two Ugandan policemen were killed by an angry mob of civilians. The police, accompanied by the Uganda People's Defence Force (UPDF), arrived at the Rwenzururu royal palace at around 10:00 am (EAT). Brigadier Peter Elwelu, who was in charge of the soldiers and policemen outside the palace, was ordered to storm the palace in an hour if the conflict had not been resolved peacefully by then. At 11:00 am, Ugandan President Yoweri Museveni issued an ultimatum to Charles Mumbere, the Omusinga (king) of Rwenzururu, demanding that he surrender his guards and their weapons within two hours or he will "face the consequences". At approximately 1:01 pm, Ugandan security forces stormed the royal palace, and the ensuing firefight resulted in the deaths of 87 royal guards and at least 16 policemen.

According to Atkins Katusabe, a local MP who was part of the negotiating team inside the palace, the raid was conducted despite attempts by the negotiators to create a peaceful resolution to the conflict. Katusabe also claimed that the royal guards were unarmed, and that the reason he and Rwenzururian Prime Minister Johnson Thembo Kitsumbire survived was because Ugandan soldiers had escorted them out just before the raid.

== Aftermath ==
The Ugandan government gave an official death toll of 103 in March 2017. Human Rights Watch, however, estimated that at least 156 people had been killed in the clashes.

Ugandan authorities arrested and charged over 180 people in the weeks following the clashes. Mumbere was arrested and charged with murder on 30 November 2016. In a court hearing on 13 December 2016, Mumbere received additional charges of terrorism, aggravated robbery and attempted murder. Kitsumbire was later also arrested at his home in Kasese. The Ugandan government announced on 26 December 2016 that a total of 167 Rwenzururian royal guards had surrendered to Ugandan security forces in return for amnesty. A large number of royal guards opted to go into hiding, fearing for their lives. Many fled to the Democratic Republic of the Congo.

By February 2019, 87 royal guards had returned from exile and peacefully surrendered after negotiations with the Busongora Development Forum, a local community-based organisation.

On 13 June 2023, Uganda's Director of Public Prosecutions Jane Frances Abodo withdrew all charges against Mumbere and 200 royal guards. The decision followed a government amnesty which was granted to those who admitted to having committed a crime, denounced rebellious activities, and agreed to reconcile with the government. Two of the accused, Kitsumbire and Masereka Kamada, rejected the terms of the amnesty and remain in jail.

== See also ==
- Rwenzori Mountains
- Rwenzururu movement
- List of massacres in Uganda
- Human rights in Uganda
