= Ekikibi =

Bakonzo cultural dance

- Video of Bakonzo dancing
- Native name: Ekikibi
- Genre: Performing arts
- Instrument(s): Endara | Shakers
- Origin: Rwenzururu

Ekikibi is a traditional love dance of the Bakonzo people, who live in the Rwenzori Mountains of western Uganda and eastern Democratic Republic of Congo. Bakonzo are a Bantu ethnic group located in the Rwenzori region in districts that include; Kasese, Bundibugyo, Bunyangabu and Ntoroko districts. The dance is performed during weddings and other festive occasions, and it expresses the joy and affection of the bride and groom.

== History ==
Ekikibi is based on the movement of fish in water, which the Bakonzo people observed and admired. The dance was also influenced by the environment and culture of the mountainous region, where the Bakonzo have lived for centuries. The dance has been passed down from generation to generation, and it is considered a symbol of the Bakonzo identity and heritage.

== Performance ==
Ekikibi is performed by a group of dancers, usually consisting of four men and four women, who wear colorful costumes and adornments. The dance is accompanied by love songs, which praise the bride and groom, and by musical instruments, such as drums, flutes, and rattles. The dancers move in a circular formation, with the men on the outside and the women on the inside. The dance involves rhythmic steps, jumps, twists, and turns, which mimic the movement of the fish. The dancers also exchange gestures and eye contact, which convey their feelings and emotions.

== Significance ==
Ekikibi is a dance that celebrates love, marriage, and happiness. It is a way of expressing the bond and harmony between the bride and groom, and between the two families. It is also a way of honoring the ancestors and the gods, who are believed to bless the union and protect the couple. Ekikibi is a dance that showcases the beauty and richness of the Bakonzo culture, and it is a source of pride and joy for the people.
