= Konjo =

Konjo may refer to:

- Konjo people of Uganda
- Konjo language (Bantu), the Bantu language spoken by them
- Coastal Konjo language, an Austronesian language spoken in Sulawesi, Indonesia
- Highland Konjo language, an Austronesian language spoken in Sulawesi, Indonesia

== See also ==
- Kómnzo language, a Papuan language of Papua New Guinea
