= Rwenzururu movement =

Secessionist movement in Uganda

- Flag of the movement
- Leaders: Isaya Mukirania; Charles Mumbere
- Dates active: 1962–1982
- Active regions: Rwenzururu region
- Ideology: Konjo and Amba self-determination

The Rwenzururu movement was an armed secessionist movement active in southwest Uganda, in the subnational kingdom of Tooro. The group was made up of ethnic Konjo and Amba fighters and was led by Isaya Mukirania. It disbanded in 1982 following successful peace negotiations with the Ugandan government.

== History ==
After decades of being subjects of the Tooro Kingdom, the Konjo and Amba peoples asked the British colonial government in Uganda to provide them their own district in the 1950s, separate from the Toro District. The colonial authorities denied their request, and Konjo and Amba fighters subsequently launched a low-intensity guerrilla war against the government in response.

In the 1960s, the Rwenzururu Freedom movement began to shift its objective from creating a separate district to creating a fully independent kingdom, and on 30 June 1962, the movement declared an independent Kingdom of Rwenzururu with Isaya Mukirania as the Omusinga of Rwenzururu, three months before the independence of Uganda. The violence reached its height in 1963 and 1964, when ethnic Tooro militants massacred those from the Konjo and Amba groups as they sought control over the lower valleys. The Uganda Army intervened against the Rwenzururu separatists, inflicting significant damage. One of the units that took part in the suppression of the Rwenzururu movement was the Ugandan Army's 1st Battalion. Despite claims that this intervention crippled the rebels, the Rwenzururu movement continued to "thrive" during the 1960s and further expanded its influence during the Second Republic of Uganda under Idi Amin.

After the Uganda–Tanzania War and the collapse of the regime of Idi Amin in 1979, Rwenzururu fighters looted abandoned weapons and supplies left by the retreating Uganda Army, reestablishing themselves as a serious threat in the region. By May 1980, the rebels controlled Kasese, and they were negotiating with the new Ugandan government to end the conflict. In 1982, the administration of President Milton Obote negotiated a settlement with the leaders of the movement, in which they agreed to abandon the goal of secession in exchange for "a degree of local autonomy", the appointment of ethnic Konjo and Amba to government administrative posts, and economic benefits such as vehicles and educational scholarships distributed by local elders. During the negotiations, the government preferred direct talks, as they believed third-party mediation would give legitimacy to the Rwenzururu claim.

Amon Bazira, who was a key supporter of the movement to overthrow Idi Amin, had been a key person in the negotiations between the Rwenzururu movement and the Obote government. His belief was that the movement was a largely middle class organisation that could be appeased with commercial prizes. Bazira later approached President Mobutu Sese Seko of Zaire and President Daniel arap Moi of Kenya, both of whom had grounds for disliking the new Ugandan government led by Yoweri Museveni, and asked for support for a new Konjo-led rebellion under an organisation called the National Army for the Liberation of Uganda (NALU).

In 1993, Bazira was assassinated at the State House of Kenya in Nakuru, a probable target of Ugandan agents. In 1995, Sudanese agents engineered the merging of the remnants of NALU with the Uganda Muslim Liberation Army and the Buganda monarchist Allied Democratic Movement in order to give these latter organisations a local constituency, creating the Allied Democratic Forces.

== See also ==
- Rwenzori Mountains
- Isaya Mukirania
- Tom Stacey
