= Loyce Biira Bwambale =

Ugandan politician

Hon Loyce Biira Bwambale
- Born: 16 October 1952 (age 73); Uganda
- Citizenship: Uganda
- Education: Makerere University (Botany and zoology (BSc), Hon; Diploma in Education, first class)
- Occupations: Botanist and teacher
- Years active: 1977 – present

Loyce Biira Bwambale is a former member of the Pan-African Parliament from Uganda.

She had been a teacher, and also served as Deputy Minister of Gender from 1992 to 1994 and a member of the National Assembly of Uganda from 1996 to 2001.

She was acting prime minister for the subnational kingdom of Rwenzururu and a Member of Parliament for Kasese District from 1989 to 2006 before she joined the Rwenzururu kingdom as the first Deputy Prime Minister in 2010.

== Education ==
Loyce Biira Bwambale was born in Kasese District in the western part of Uganda in 1952. She completed her Primary School from Bwera Primary School, in Bwera in 1967. During 1968 through 1971, she attended Kyebambe Girls Secondary School from S1 to S4. From 1972 to 1974, she studied for her S5 and S6 at Nabumali High School.

From 1974 through 1977, she attended Makerere University, where she obtained her first degree, the BSC [Botany & Zoology] (Hon) with a Diploma in Education (first Class).

== See also ==
- List of Members of the Pan-African Parliament
