= Nande people =

Nande, Yira
BaNande
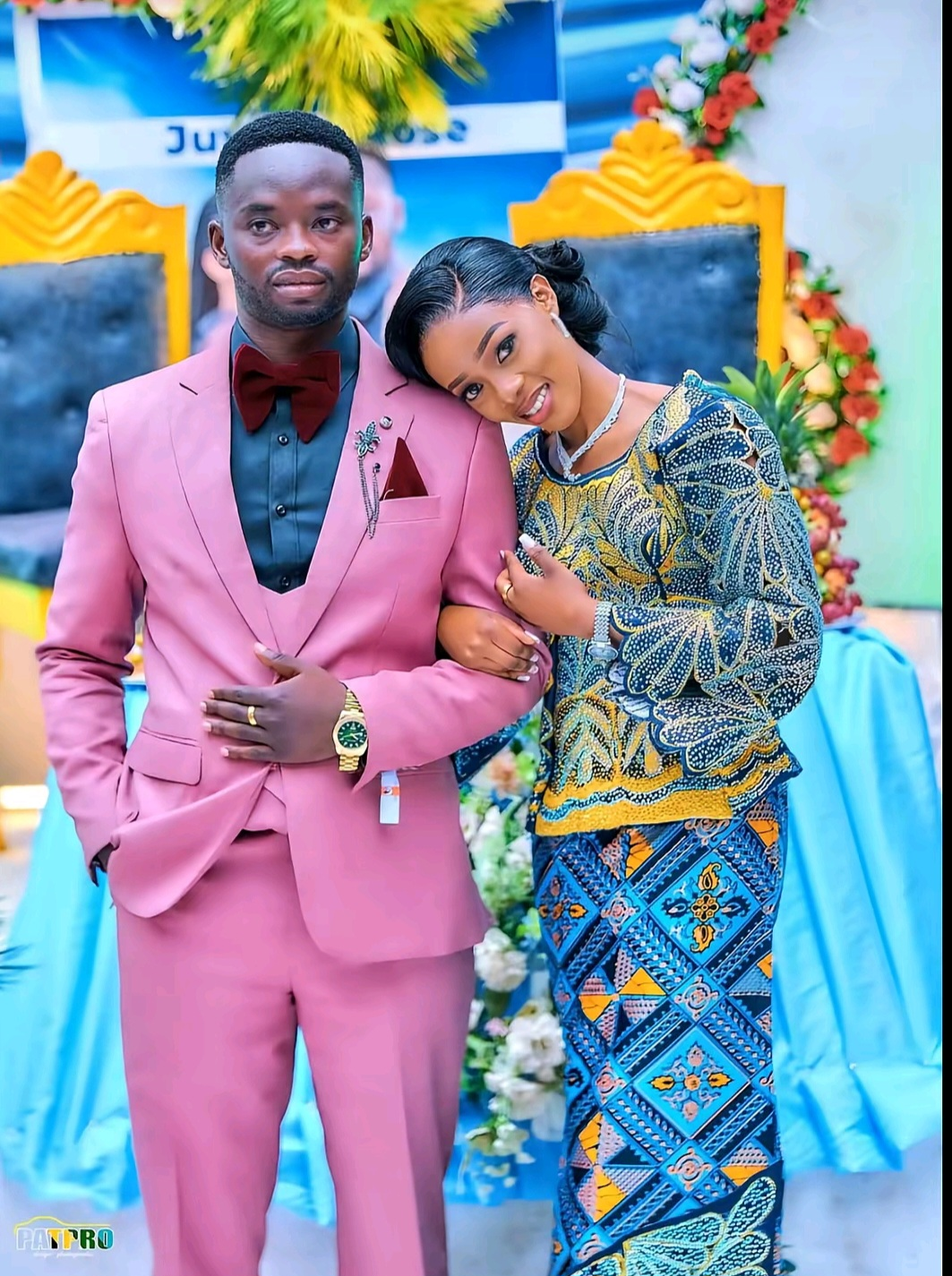

Regions with significant populations
- Democratic Republic of the Congo (primarily North Kivu)

Languages
- Nande, Swahili, French

Religion
- Christianity (mostly Roman Catholic), Traditional African religions

Related ethnic groups
- Hunde, Konjo, Komo, Nyanga, other Great Lakes Bantu

- Person: Munande, Muyira
- People: Wa/Banande, Bayira
- Language: Kinande, Olhuyira
- Country: Bunande

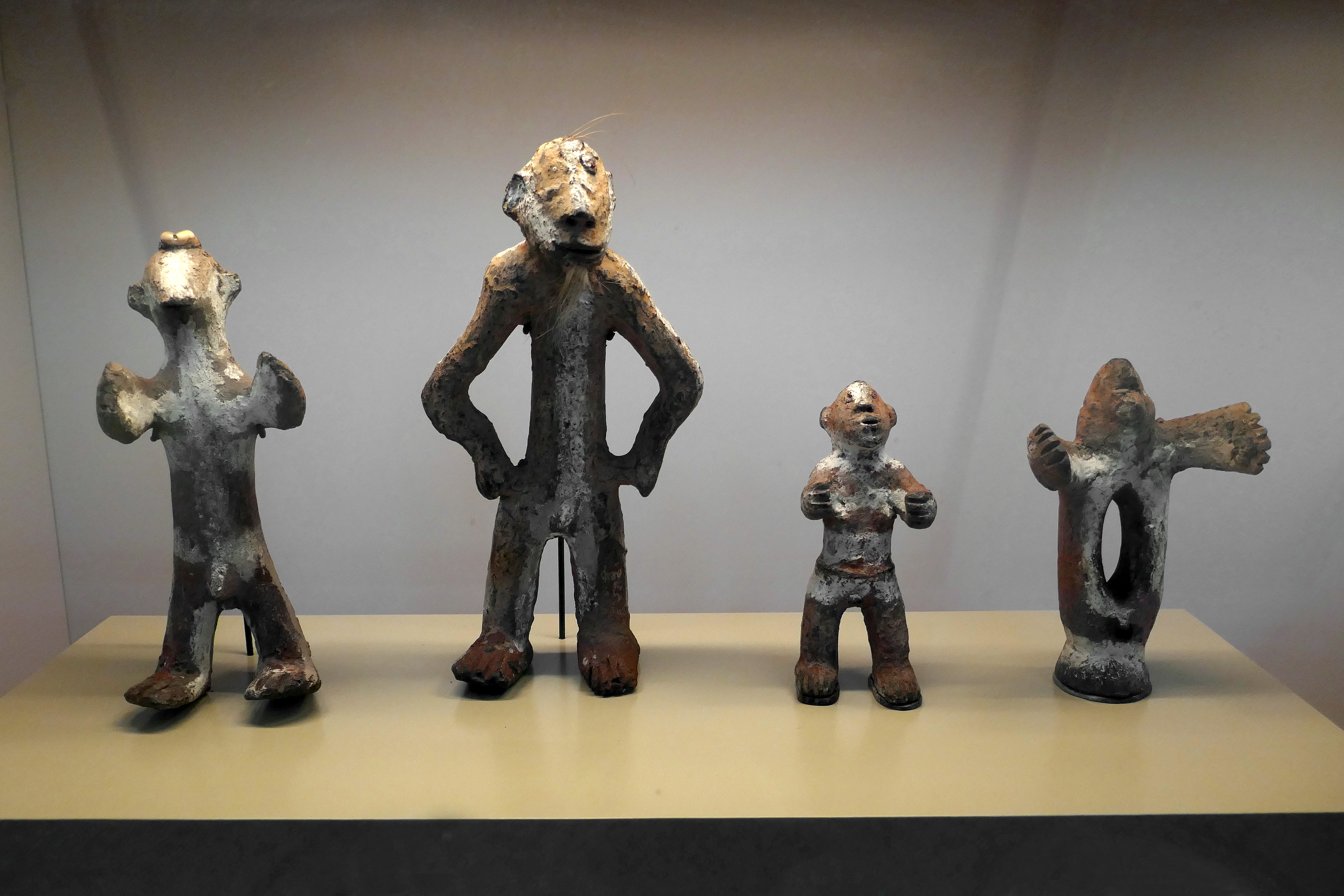
Nande clay figurines, Royal Museum for Central Africa.

The Nande or Yira are a Bantu people living in the east of the Democratic Republic of Congo, mostly in North Kivu (Beni and Lubero Territories), where they constitute more than 60% of the population. They speak the Nande language and are closely related to the Konjo people of Uganda, sometimes regarded as the same people.

The Nande are divided into 12 clans, namely Baswagha, Basukali, Bamate, Bahira, Bakira, Bahambo, Bito, Batangi, Bahumbe, Bakumbule, Batike and Babinga. Each clan is independent and governed by its own family head, also called "king" (omukama, omughole ou omwami), while there is no common supreme king.

The Nande are mainly farmers and breeders of small livestock, even if livestock farming is a prerogative of only a few large families. They grow plantains, tubers and cereals as staple foods, and coffee, cocoa, cinchona and tea for export. Other activities include fishing in nearby Lake Edward and trade, historically focused on salt extracted from Lake Katwe in Uganda.
