= Rwenzururu =

Region in western Uganda

Kingdom of Rwenzururu Obusinga bwa Rwenzururu (Konjo)
- Flag Coat of arms
- Motto: Habwa Kayingo n'Obusinga Bwethu (Konzo); "For God and our Kingdom"
- Anthem: Rwenzururu Wethu (Konzo) "Our Rwenzururu"
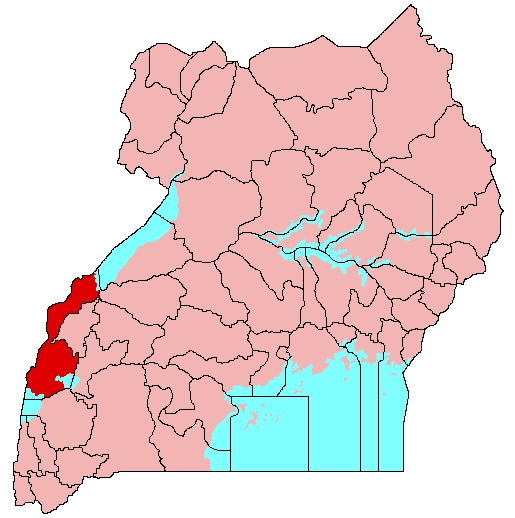
- Location of Rwenzururu (red) in Uganda (pink)
- Status: Traditional kingdom
- Capital: Kasese
- Official languages: Konjo, English
- Ethnic groups: Bakonjo; Baamba, Basongora, Baynabindi, Batuku
- Demonyms: Omunyarwenzururu (singular); Abanyarwenzururu (plural)
- Government: Constitutional monarchy
  - Monarch: Irema-Ngoma I
  - Prime Minister: Benson Kule Baritazale
- Legislature: Ekyaghanda

Establishment
  - Independence declared from the Tooro Kingdom: 30 June 1962
  - Autonomy granted by the Ugandan government: 13 August 1982
  - Recognised as a cultural institution: 17 March 2008

Area
  - Total: 4,808.2 km^{2} (1,856.5 sq mi)

Population
  - Estimate: 900,000
- Currency: Ugandan shilling
- Time zone: UTC+3
- Calling code: 256

- Person: Mukonzo
- People: Bakonzo
- Language: Lhukonzo

Rwenzururu is one of the 17 officially recognised Kingdoms in Uganda, located in the western part of the country along the Rwenzori Mountains on the border with the Democratic Republic of the Congo. It includes the districts of Bundibugyo, Kasese and Ntoroko. Rwenzururu is also the name given to the region the kingdom is located in.

Rwenzururu's first Omusinga (king), Isaya Mukirania (Kibanzanga I), declared independence from the Tooro Kingdom on 30 June 1962. However, the Ugandan government did not officially recognise the kingdom's legitimacy until 17 March 2008.

== Background ==
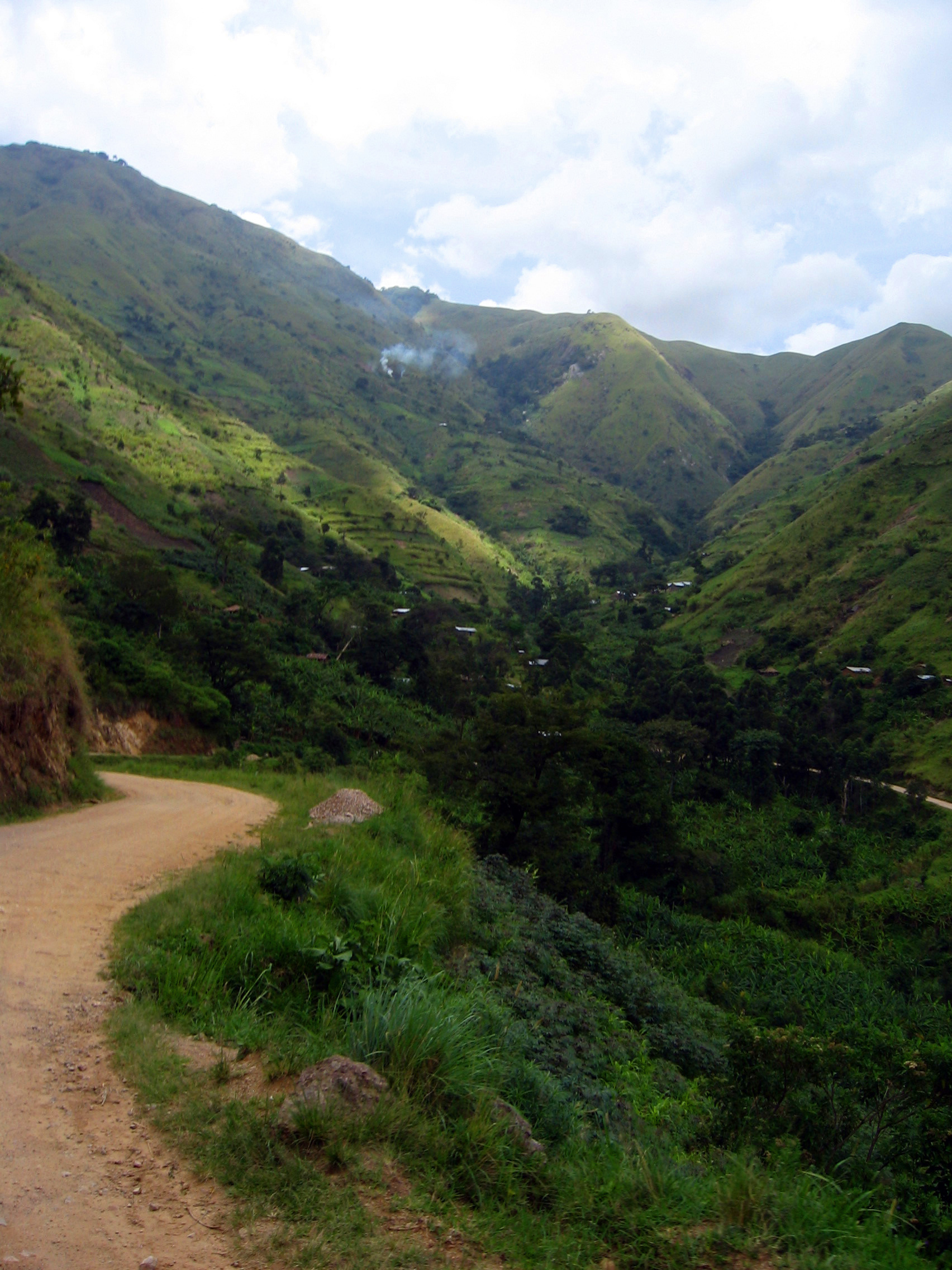
Road in Rwenzori region valley.

The Rwenzururu region is inhabited by the Konjo and Amba peoples. In the early 20th century, these two tribes were integrated into the Tooro Kingdom as a political maneuver by the British colonialists: the neighboring Bunyoro monarchy was anti-colonialist and the British wished to strengthen the pro-British Tooro. The Bakonjo and Baamba initially accepted being arbitrarily made subjects of the Tooro monarch with resignation, but asked the Uganda Protectorate to provide them their own district in the 1950s, separate from the Tooro District. The movement declared that they were not part of the Tooro Kingdom on 30 June 1962, three months before national independence.

== History ==
The Bakonzo and Baamba were serfs under the Tooro Kingdom. Tooro controlled the Lake Katwe and the Kasenyi crater lakes where salt was mined. The Batooro only taught their language in schools. Bursaries and scholarships, tax assessor positions, senior positions in the administration of the Tooro kingdom were primarily given to the Batooro. These grievances caused Isaaya Mukirane, Peter Mupalia and Jeremiah Kawamara to walk out of the Rukurato, Tooro kingdom’s parliament on March 13, 1962.

Isaaya Mukirane, Peter Mupalia and Jeremiah Kawamara submitted their grievances to Omukama Kamurasi Rukidi, who later rejected them. The three were arrested and charged for insulting the Omukama. They were released on bail on July 19, 1962.

After their request was denied by the colonial authorities, the Bakonjo and Baamba launched a low-intensity guerrilla war that continued through independence after the Milton Obote regime warned them against secession. The movement carrying out the armed struggle was named "Rwenzururu". While the movement began to achieve recognition as a separate district, it eventually became a movement to secede and form their own kingdom. The Rwenzururu Freedom movement declared an independent Kingdom of Rwenzururu on 30 June 1962, three months before national independence, with Isaya Mukirania as the Omusinga (king).

The violence reached a height in 1963 and 1964, when Tooro soldiers massacred many Konjo and Amba people as they sought to control the lower valleys. The Ugandan army intervened against the separatists, doing such significant damage to the Rwenzururu that the movement was suppressed for some time. The movement, however, achieved fame through a local folk epic.

In 1976 the Amin government created the district of Kasese separated from the Tooro district, but the Rwenzururu deemed this insufficient.

The Rwenzururu gradually re-established itself in the collapse of the regime of Idi Amin in 1979 where President Godfrey Lukongwa Binaisa, granted Kasese district the right to appoint their own DC (district commissioner) and chiefs.

In October 1980, Amon Bazira, a Uganda People’s Congress Member of parliament for Kasese talked with the Rwenzururu to support the UPC. And the Rwenzururu used terrorist strategies to force people to vote for UPC. Those strategies led to the assassination of Vito Muhindo who was the Democratic Party candidate. And Chrispus Kiyonga a Uganda Patrotic Movement candidate won the Member of Parliament seat. The Batooro, Bakiga and Banyankore were not allowed to register as candidates as they were informed to leave Kasese district before the registrations begun.

As government soldiers retreated in the Uganda-Tanzania War, the Rwenzururu looted the weapons and supplies left behind. Thus well-armed, the Rwenzururu was once again able to pose a serious threat to regional control from 1979 to 1982. In 1982, however, the administration of President Milton Obote negotiated a settlement with the Rwenzururu leaders in which they agreed to abandon the goal of secession in exchange for "a degree of local autonomy," the appointment of Bakonjo and Baamba to government administrative posts, and economic benefits such as vehicles and educational scholarships to be distributed by local elders. During the negotiations, the government preferred direct talks, as they believed third-party mediation would give legitimacy to the Rwenzururu claim.

Amon Bazira had been a key person in the negotiations between the Rwenzururu and Obote government. His insight was that the Rwenzururu was a largely middle class organization that could be placated with commercial prizes. He later approached President Mobutu Sese Seko of Zaire and President Daniel arap Moi of Kenya, who both had grounds for disliking the new Ugandan government led by Yoweri Museveni, for support for new Bakonjo rebellion under an organization called the National Army for the Liberation of Uganda (NALU). Bazira was shot dead in the State House in Nakuru, Kenya in 1993, a probable target of Ugandan agents. In 1995, Sudanese agents engineered the merging of the remnants of NALU with the Uganda Muslim Liberation Army and the Baganda monarchist Allied Democratic Movement in order to give these latter organizations a local constituency, creating the Allied Democratic Forces.

Charles Mumbere was installed as the Omusinga wa Rwenzururu after the death of his father (Isaya Mukirania by the clan leaders and the elders.

== Government recognition ==
In 2001, the Bakonzo asked the Ugandan government for their own state.

A survey carried out by Makerere University found that 87% of the local population in Rwenzururu favored the creation of a kingdom. In 2005, President Museveni directed a ministerial committee headed by Second Deputy Prime Minister and Minister for Public Service Henry Kajura to investigate the Rwenzururu claim to a kingdom and issue a report of his findings. The report stated that over 80% of the Bakonjo and Baamba favoured the creation of a kingdom with Charles Mumbere as the Omusinga (king). It further found that there is no historical claim for a Rwenzururu kingdom or a group of people called Banyarwenzururu, but recommended that the government bow to the wishes of the people. Pursuant to these recommendations, on 17 March 2008 the Ugandan cabinet endorsed the Kingdom of Rwenzururu as a cultural institution and crowned Mumbere as Omusinga Irema-Ngoma I. Three contenders for the throne criticized the government's recognition of Mumbere as Omusinga of Rwenzururu. The government restored the Kingdom of Rwenzururu in 2009.

== See also ==
- 2016 Kasese clashes
- Tom Stacey
