= Songola language =

Bantu language spoken in DR Congo

Songola
- North Binja
- Songoora
- Native to: DR Congo
- Native speakers: (1,300 cited 1971)
- Language family: Niger–Congo?: Atlantic–Congo; Benue–Congo; Bantoid; Bantu (Zone D.20); Lega–Binja; Songola

Language codes
- ISO 639-3: sod
- Glottolog: song1300
- Guthrie code: D.24

Songola (Songoora), or North Binja, is a minor Bantu language of the Democratic Republic of the Congo, spoken by the Songora people.
