= Tom Stacey =

British writer (1930–2022)

Tom Stacey FRSL
- Born: 11 January 1930
- Died: 24 December 2022 (aged 92)
- Education: Wellesley House School; Eton College
- Alma mater: Worcester College, Oxford

Tom Stacey FRSL (11 January 1930 – 24 December 2022) was a British novelist, publisher, screenwriter, journalist and penologist. He was a prominent member of White's.

== Early life ==
Stacey attended Wellesley House School (1938–1943), originally at Broadstairs, Kent, but from September 1939 was evacuated to the Scottish Highlands.

At Eton College (1943–48) Stacey became a fourth-generation successive Stacey pupil at Eton, where he was a solo treble, the founder of Wotton's Society in the field of philosophy, editor (with Douglas Hurd) of the weekly Eton College Chronicle, winner of the Essay Prize, and House Captain. With the Scots Guards (1948–50), in which he received his commission as Second Lieutenant, on active service in what is now known as peninsular Malaysia, he spent his leave with the Temiar aborigines in the jungle, and wrote his first book (The Hostile Sun).

At Worcester College, Oxford, England (1950–51), he left without taking a degree but founded and co-organised the controversial students' tour operation, Undergrad Tours, during the 1951 Festival of Britain year.

== Journalistic career ==
Stacey was staff writer at the Lilliput Magazine (1951–52), as a colleague of Patrick Campbell and Maurice Richardson. He then became feature writer and foreign correspondent for Picture Post (1952–54). During 1954 he became the Daily Express (London) 'Express Explorer' in which he crossed Africa overland from the Atlantic to East Africa, accompanied by Ugandan Cambridge university graduate Erisa Kironde, and lived with the Bakonzo people of the Ruwenzori Mountains.

Briefly a roving correspondent for the Montreal Star (1955–56), he rejoined the Daily Express in 1956–60 as foreign correspondent and diplomatic correspondent, with a spell as daily America columnist in 1957. He joined The Sunday Times as roving correspondent and chief foreign correspondent (1960–65), with a worldwide brief, covering the dismantling of the British Empire globally, and major conflict zones of the period, and interviewing many heads of state (including Nikita Khrushchev, Morarji Desai, Ayub Khan, Harold Macmillan, and Éamon de Valera).

Stacey then moved to the London Evening Standard (1965–67), where he was a columnist and roving correspondent, while standing for Parliament. Subsequent freelance assignments were undertaken for The Times, The Sunday Telegraph, The Daily Telegraph, The Observer, Daily Mail, and The Spectator. In all, Stacey reported from over 120 countries, many of them several times.

== Publishing career ==
From 1967 to 1970, he was editor and creator of Correspondents World Wide, a current affairs service for schools and universities, mobilising the skills of several distinguished journalistic colleagues.

From 1969 to 1973, he was creator and joint managing director of general publishers Tom Stacey Ltd and subsidiaries (Tom Stacey Reprints, Tom Stacey Education Ltd), which published, inter alia, the Prospect for Man ecological series, and created the 20-volume Peoples of the Earth series, conceived by Stacey and released by Tom Stacey Ltd, Grolier (US) and Mondadori in 14 languages.

In 1974, he founded Stacey International, the book publisher, originally majoring extensively on the Middle East and Islamic world, later expanding into general book publishing and initiating the literary fiction imprint Capuchin Classics, the Independent Minds series campaigning on heterodox climate science and the legalisation of all drugs; and the "return of real history" with the reissue of Carter & Mear's History of Britain for schools, in 9 volumes.

== Personal life, politics and penology ==
In January 1952, he married Caroline Clay who was to become a widely exhibited sculptor, mostly in clay for bronze. They have five children (Emma, healer, born 1952; Tilly, potter, born 1954; Isabella, born 1957 (married to Christopher Simon Sykes, the photographer and biographer), who as an international stage and opera designer/director works as Isabella Bywater (being the name of her first husband, Michael Bywater); Sam, born 1966, a civil engineer and mountaineer; and Tomasina, a midwife, born 1967.

The couple lived at Clementi House, Kensington Church Street, an early 18th-century house that became Felix Mendelssohn's base during his early sojourns in London.

In October 1954, in Uganda, Stacey co-founded the Bakonzo Life History Research Society, which, throughout a tempestuous campaign demanding his consistent involvement, was to emerge as the vehicle of a recognised Kingdom of Rwenzururu 55 years later.

In March 1963, Stacey was urgently invited by Milton Obote, Prime Minister of newly independent Uganda, to mediate between the Government and secessionist Bakonzo tribe in the Ruwenzori Mountains (Rwenzururu) while furloughed from the Sunday Times.

Stacey contested the parliamentary seat of Hammersmith North for the Conservatives in 1964, and was defeated; and of Dover in 1966, where, again defeated, he increased the Party vote against a landslide to Labour nationally. Re-adopted for Dover, he decided to quit active politics the following year to allow for his creative life.

In 1968, he jointly led the first water-borne expedition descending the upper reaches of the Blue Nile from its source.

In 1974, he became a prison visitor, following his own imprisonment (as a foreign correspondent) in India in 1965. He continued in the role ever since.

In 1981, he conceived the electronic tag for (appropriate) offenders, as an alternative to imprisonment, and in 1982 formed and launched the Offender's Tag Association(OTA) as a pressure group for the adoption and exploitation of the tag (a term adopted by Stacey from the inception of the scheme). Offender tagging has subsequently become widely used in penological reform in Britain and throughout the world. Stacey remained Director of the OTA.

In 1999, he conceived and organised 'Pilgrimage 2000', a nationwide Christian pilgrimage, starting at eight sacred sites and converging upon Canterbury to herald the new Millennium.

In 2001, Stacey ascended to the Ruwenzori glaciers following the defeat of the ADF guerilla invaders from the Congo. His 500-page work Tribe, the Hidden History of the Mountain of the Moon (2003) proved to be of decisive influence in Uganda's recognition of the Kingdom of Rwenzururu as one of the five Kingdoms of the country's Bantu south.

In 2009, Stacey was hailed by the approximately 800,000 people of the Ruwenzori Mountains as "catalytic agent" in the recognition by the Government of Uganda of their ethno-cultural entity, Rwenzururu, with its King who is now in remand (28/11/2016) in Kampala for allegedly inciting violence, rebellion and calling for independence from Uganda, in clashes reported to leave over 50 people dead.

Stacey died from pneumonia on 24 December 2022, at the age of 92.

== Literary work ==
Tom Stacey wrote his literary work in response to the inner clamour of each work to be written. The flow of such work is consequently irregular.

Stacey's novel Deadline was filmed to his own screenplay in 1989, starring John Hurt and Imogen Stubbs, but he has disowned the film in disgust at its editing.

Stacey was elected a Fellow of the Royal Society of Literature in 1977. His awards include the John Llewellyn Rhys Memorial Prize, and the (Granada) Foreign Correspondent of the Year Award (1961). Various of his novels have been Book of the Year choices by critics of national journals, including Decline (Sunday Telegraph), Tribe (TLS), and The Man Who Knew Everything (New Statesman). Most of his fiction has been separately published in the US, and some in translation. Works-in-progress include two novels, and two further collections of long-short stories.

Profiles of Stacey have been published in the Observer Magazine and elsewhere. His early fiction is assessed in Contemporary Novelists (St Martin's Press, New York, 1972).

== Bibliography ==
- The Hostile Sun (Duckworth, 1952), describing his journey into the Malayan rainforest in 1950.
- The Brothers M (Secker and Warburg, 1960), a novel, set in Africa and Britain, also published in the US and in translation
- Summons to Ruwenzori (Secker and Warburg, 1965), being the account of his attempt to mediate peace between the Rwenzururu rebellion and the Uganda government
- Today’s World, a map-book of world affairs (Collins, 1970)
- Immigration and Enoch Powell (Stacey, 1971)
- The Living and the Dying (Macmillan, 1976), a novel
- The Pandemonium (WH Allen, 1980), a novel
- The Twelfth Night of Ramadan (Heinemann, 1983), a novel written under the nom-de-plume of Kendal J Peel
- The Worm in the Rose (Heinemann, 1985), a novel
- Deadline (Heinemann, 1988), a novel, made into a TV film the same year
- Bodies and Souls (Heinemann, 1989), collected long-short stories
- Decline (Heinemann, 1991), a novel
- Thomas Brassey, the Greatest Railway Builder in the World (Stacey International, 2005) a biographical monograph
- Successive long-short stories: The Same Old Story, The Tether of the Flesh, Golden Rain, Grief, The Swap, Boredom or the Yellow Trousers, Mary’s Visit, and The Kelpie from Rhum (published in Confrontation, New York, between 1999 and 2009), Ngungha 2016
- Tribe, the Hidden History of the Mountains of the Moon (Stacey International, 2003), a work of travel and Kingdom-building in Rwenzururu in central Africa
- The First Dog to be Somebody’s Best Friend (Stacey International 2007), for children
- The Man Who Knew Everything (Capuchin Classics 2008), being a revised version of Deadline
- A Dark and Stormy Night (Medina Publishing 2018)
