= Lega–Binja languages =

Lega–Binja
- Linguistic classification: Niger–Congo?: Atlantic–Congo; Benue–Congo; Southern Bantoid; Bantu (Zone D.20); Lega–Binja

Language codes
- ISO 639-3: –
- Glottolog: zimb1251 (Zimba)

The Lega–Binja languages are part of the Bantu languages coded Zone D.20 in Guthrie's classification, specifically D.24–26, which according to Nurse & Philippson (2003) form a valid clade. According to Ethnologue, Bembe, which Nurse & Philippson were not sure belonged in its traditional group of D.50, is the closest language to Lega-Mwenga; Glottolog has it closest to Songoora. The resulting languages are:

Shabunda-Lega (incl. Kanu, Kwami), Mwenga-Lega, Bembe, Songoora (North Binja), Zimba (South Binja)
