= Deadline (1988 film) =

1988 British drama television film

Deadline is a 1988 British drama television film, directed by Richard Stroud and based on a novel and adapted for the screen by Tom Stacey, which aired on BBC. It stars John Hurt.

== Plot ==
An alcoholic Fleet Street journalist is caught up in a coup on an island in the Persian Gulf, where the Emir's son and an enforcer attempt to depose his father.

== Cast ==
- John Hurt as Granville Jones
- Imogen Stubbs as Lady Romy Burton
- Robert McBain as Sandy McCulloch
- Greg Hicks as Lou Rivers
- Bargach Abdelrahim as Abdullah
- Julian Curry as Stuart-Smith
- David Conville as Sir Geoffrey Burton
- Roshan Seth as The Emir of Hawa
