= Zimba language =

Bantu language spoken in DR Congo

Zimba
- South Binja
- Native to: DR Congo
- Native speakers: (120,000 cited 1994 census)
- Language family: Niger–Congo?: Atlantic–Congo; Benue–Congo; Bantoid; Bantu (Zone D.20); Lega–Binja; Zimba
- Dialects: Kwange; Mamba

Language codes
- ISO 639-3: zmb
- Glottolog: zimb1251
- Guthrie code: D.26

Zimba is a Bantu language of the Democratic Republic of the Congo, spoken in a band of country south of the Elila River. It is not closely related to other languages, unless the divergent dialects Kwange and Mamba (Kyenyemamba) are considered separate languages.
