= Nande language =

Bantu language spoken in DR Congo

Nande
- Yira
- Konzo
- Native to: Democratic Republic of the Congo
- Region: Nord-Kivu province
- Language family: Niger–Congo?: Atlantic–Congo; Volta-Congo; Benue–Congo; Bantoid; Southern Bantoid; Bantu; Northeast Bantu; Great Lakes Bantu; Rwenzori; Nande

Language codes
- ISO 639-3: nnb
- Glottolog: nand1264
- Guthrie code: JD.42

Nande (Yira) is a Bantu language spoken in the east of the Democratic Republic of Congo in the territories of Beni and Lubero. The Yira constitute more than 60% of the population of the province of North Kivu. The language is also spoken in Uganda by the Konjo (see Konjo language).

The Yira are subdivided into 14 clans including the Baswagha, Basu (Basukali for female), Bamate (just a family name), Bahira, Bakira, Bahambo, Bito, Batangi, Basongora, Bakumbule, Batike, Babinga, Balhumba and Balegha. The 14 clans are subdivided into families, and each clan is ruled by its own family head, also called clan chief (Omukulhu wolhughanda). The king of the Yira is called Omusinga (the leader).

== Language ==
The Nande of Congo and the Konjo people of Uganda are a single ethnic group, which they call Yira (Bayira). They trace their origins to the Ruwenzori Mountains between the two countries. The languages Nande and Konjo are close enough to be considered divergent dialects. Nande has a number of dialects of its own: Nande proper, Kumbule, Mate, Tangi, Sanza, Shu, Songola (Songoora, Nyangala), Swaga / Kira (in Nande, all of these are prefixed with eki-).

Their language is Olhuyira, a Bantu language whose number of speakers in the DRC was estimated at more than 10,000,000 in 2022 and nearly 1,000,000 in Uganda.

For the varieties of this language known as Shu we are given the information that another language, "EkiShukaali" was formerly spoken by the women, the AvaShukaali. This may be a specific reference to some kind of "secret jargon" into which the girls, and not boys, were initiated.

Some of the Nande of Congo have a patron–vassal relationship with the Efé Pygmies.

== Phonology ==
=== Consonants ===
		Bilabial	Dental	Alveolar	Palatal	Velar	Glottal
Plosive	voiceless	p	t̪	t		k	
Plosive	prenasal	ᵐb		ⁿd		ᵑɡ	
Affricate				t͡s			
Fricative	plain	β		s		ɣ	h
Fricative	prenasal			ⁿz			
Nasal		m		n	ɲ		
Rhotic	trill			r			
Rhotic	tap			ɾ			
Approximant				l	(j)	(w)	

- Palatal and labio-velar glides [j, w] are only heard as a result of front vowels /i, ɪ, ɛ/ or back vowels /u, ʊ, ɔ/ preceding other vowels, or in stem-initial positions between two vowels.
- Voiceless plosives /p, t, k/ can be freely heard as voiced [b, d, ɡ] among speakers, or voiced stops may also occur in loanwords.

=== Vowels ===
	Front	Central	Back
Close	i		u
Near-close	ɪ		ʊ
Close-mid	ɛ ~ e		ɔ ~ o
Open-mid	ɛ ~ e		ɔ ~ o
Open		a	

- Sounds /ɛ, ɔ/ can also occur as more tense (close) vowels [e, o] within stems containing tense vowels (like /i, u/), or within stems in plural form.

== Economy ==
Among the Nande people there is a lot of trade. Historically, the Nande people traded salt from Lake Katwe in Uganda. Thanks to the evolution of trade among the Nande and following their strong economic relations with East Africa, the Middle and the Far East, villages have now become cities: Butembo, Beni, Oicha, Luholu, Kasindi ... and neighboring agglomerations have become towns: Goma, Kisangani, Bunia, Isiro, etc.

Despite the economic crisis that hit the whole country during the time of the Republic of Zaire, the region of Beni-Lubero and the city of Butembo have maintained a flourishing economic activity and until today despite the wars. Industrialization had started in the region at the initiative of the local economic elite with the special economic zone of Musienene. The Nande people have also produced an intellectual elite who have distinguished themselves in all areas of national and international life, and particularly:

- in civil society and development NGOs;
- in political parties;
- in the public management of the country;
- in the Catholic and Protestant Church;
- in higher and university education;
- in the arts;

The Nande people are above all farmers and breeders of small livestock, cattle breeding being a particularity of certain large families only. They have become the major producers and exporters of coffee, cocoa, cinchona and tea throughout the Democratic Republic of Congo. Plantains, tubers, cereals,... are other foodstuffs most cultivated among this people. They practice fishing in Lake Edward (Lake Mutsyamiria) with a production of 16,000 tons of fish per year also in the rivers Semuliki, Tayna, Talhya, Luholu, etc.

Following this evolution of agriculture for centuries among this people, several organizations have just emerged locally to sustainably support these peasant farmers.

== Names ==
The following Yira names have become very popular throughout the world, because of a great increase in the birth rate among this people and their strong representations in the various fields of life, these names form one of their particularities, these names are in each restricted family, here are their meanings:

=== Boys' names ===
1. The first eldest son of the family is called: NZANZU, KAMBERE, MUMBERE, PALUKU, BALUKU = Omuluki wekihanda (the one who weaves/reunite the family),
2. 2nd boy is called: KAMBALE, BWAMBALE, TSONGO, KAMBASU, KOMBI = Oyuka ongoza echihanda (the one who leads the family),
3. 3rd boy is called: KASEREKA, MASEREKA, KABUYAYA, KAMATE, MATHE = Oyukachirika ekihanda (the one who defends the family),
4. 4th boy is called: KAKULE, KULE= Oyukabika ebindu byekihanda (family logistician),
5. 5th boy: KATEMBO, THEMBO = Oyuka husika ne sende (in charge of finance),
6. 6th boy: MBUSA, KAVUSA = Oyuka mbusira ekihanda (in charge of diplomacy),
- The younger: NDUNGO.

=== Girls names ===
1. The first eldest daughter: MUSOKI, SOKI, KASOKI, KANYERE, MASIKA = Oyuka nyerera, sakira ekihanda (to look for food),
2. 2nd daughter: KAVIRA, KATSIRAVWENGE, BIIRA = Oyukabiraya (in charge of hygiene and cleanliness),
3. 3rd daughter: KAVUGHO, KABUO, KASWERA = Oyukabuhirira (in charge of communication / Family spokesperson),
4. 4th daughter: KAHAMBU, KAMBAMBU, MBAMBU = Oyukahambirira abandi (the one who helps others),
5. 5th daughter: KATHUNGU = Omuthungi (in charge of breeding and aesthetics),
6. 6th daughter: KYAKIMWA, KIMWA, NZIAVAKE = Oyuka kimwa (responsible for welcoming others),
7. 7th daughter: KATYA, KALIVANDA = Oyukatsiaba (protocol officer).

=== Others ===
- The boy who is born after a girl or vice versa: MUHINDO, KAHINDO.
- A child born after another who died: KATSUVA, NZUVA, MUSUBAHO.
- A child born after two others who died: KYAVIRO, KISUGHU.
- The Twins: VAHASA.
  - The 1st of the Twins: NGURU.
  - The 2nd of the Twins: NDOVYA.
- Children born after Twins: KITSA, KAMALA.
- An illegitimate child: KAHEMU, MUHEMU.

== Culture ==
The term "KYAGHANDA" designates the hut with two and sometimes three entrances, generally located in the middle of the village. It is there that the inhabitants of the village usually meet to solve their vital problems and provide, in all solidarity, solutions deemed appropriate. The Kyaghanda currently operate in several towns and villages around the world where the Yira meet.

The term “ISUMBA” designates both secret societies and the clay statuettes used in initiation rites. These closed societies were reserved for men, who had to recognize each figurine and arrange them in a precise order.

=== Dance and music ===
Dance in Olhuyira: “amasata, amavina, amahotole” is a gesture par excellence reflecting the various feelings of man developing both as a rhythm in time and in space. The position and movement of the body in the Yira dance translates prayer.

Here are some Yira dances according to the circumstances of exhibition and then according to the instruments of execution:

a) The dances according to the circumstances of exhibition

The dances can be current, ancestral according to joyful and sad events or picturesque circumstances. The art of dance being sacred or profane, we distinguish between show dance and entertainment dance.

We distinguish among the Yira:

Popular celebration dances: Omunde, Amalembo, Amangudu, Amatakiyo, Ebwaya, Ekila, Endara, Enduku and Erisole.

The enthronement or investiture dances: Emburura, Endungulu and Erighomba.

Initiation dances: Amaghengeleghengele, Engyengo, Omukumo w'avakali n'ow'avalume, Omumbitili and Omutetere.

The funeral dances: Amasindula, Engwaki, Omukonga, Omukovo and Ovusingiri.

Recreational or entertainment dances: Akasambi, Akasayi, Dahudahu, Ekibaliya, Ekidali, Ekimbati, Ekimbakisi, Ekipulenge, Ekituta, Ekiyamba, Ekururu, Emikalihyo, Enanga, Endeku, Epuli, Eriduku, Erikembe, Olusengo, Oluveve, Omughoviro, Omusayi and Ovurwani.

b) Dances according to instruments

1. Idiophones: These instruments where it is the material of which they are composed that provides the sound thanks to its acoustic properties.
  1. direct percussion:
    Endara (Xylophone)
    Esyongereghese or ngangatiro (gong)
    Esyonzeve
  2. indirect percussion:
    Erisengo (calabash bell)
    Eritsetse (Fruit Shell Bell)
    Ekiyamba (Bell)
  3. by pinching:
    Akasambi (Kaffir)
    Erikembe (sanza) or lamellophone
    Akasayi
2. Aerophones: These are air or wind instruments with a bevel or reed.
  Erirenga (Whistle)
  Enyamulera and epuli (Flute)
  Endeku-neku (whistle)
  Enguvi (horn trumpet)
  Embingu (Wizard's Whistle)
  Orumaka (wooden trumpet) whistle for fair weather makers
  Orwamo (rainmaker's whistle)
3. Membanophones: The sound is due to a stretched membrane. The following dances are performed to the accompaniment of the drums.
  Erighomba (eritingi, endingwa, emburura, endungulu)
  Erisole-Omunde-Ovusingiri-Omukumo-Omukonga
  Amasinduka-Eluma-Ekila-Amalembo
  Ebwaya-engwaya-Ekituta-Omukurusu
  Ekibaliya
4. Chordophones: All sleeveless instruments separate from the body and whose strings are parallel to its resonance board.
  Ekipulenge: musical bow (mouth zither)
  Omughoviro: trough
  arched harps:
  Enzenze (stick zither)
  Enanga (arched harp with violin body)
  Ekidali (Guitar)
5. Zithers
  Akaghovoghovo (rebec or fiddle)
  Akawarewere

== Myths ==
=== The myth of the big drum ===
The myth of the Great Drum begins with the story of the couple and the human family. He says that: “Up there, on the hill of creation, higher than the clouds of Rwenzori, God Nyamuhanga the Creator gave each creature a mission.

The Ende (cow) carried between its horns a large Risingi (drum). God Nyamuhanga had placed two human beings there: Kisi the Great Sun and Nyabhandu, the mother of men. Each was seated in his royal E'ndeve (chair) and inhaled the scent of O'Bhukwa incense; to see each other in this darkness God Nyamuhanga had given Kisi and Nyabhandu an o'bhulhengekania (consciousness) and bio-efflorescent hair that shone like the firefly (e'ngununu). This great Drum was the land of great peace O'bhuthekane.

One day, the cow wanted to relieve herself. She looked down and dropped the great Drum. She ran to God Nyamuhanga to be forgiven for losing her royal office. God Nyamuhanga sent him to reconcile with those who were seated in the great Drum which became a canoe when it crashed on Lake Mutsyamiria (Lake Edward today). While the great Drum swooped down, Kisi the Great Sun jostled Nyabhandu the mother of men. This one emitted the first word of the men which is a questioning: “what are you doing Ukayira uthi? Hence the ethnonym Yira given to the Nande to designate the people of those who were born after the first word of our Ancestors Nyabhandu and Kisi. The village they founded is called Bhuhikira, the place where they landed; the child born there is called Mukira, the ancestor of the Bakira clan; they had many children, who are the founding Ancestors of all the YIRA clans with all its ramifications”.

=== Crossing on the Dragon's Back (Omughongo we ndioka) ===
Thus, according to the mythology transmitted from father to son, the nande crossed the Semliki river, on the back of the dragon to reach the other bank in the Congo. To tell the truth, the passage was made at the ford of Kapanza. At times of drought, the stones emerge from the water so that one can easily cross the river.

It is these stone points that have been compared to the scaly back of the dragon that the narrative tradition conveys from father to son as a mythology, with an underlying religious idea. This mysterious crossing was made possible thanks to the intervention of the spirit Katulikanzira, who preceded the convoy of immigrants and settled them in the place of his choice. Nevertheless, during the crossing, part of the Nande remained in Uganda on the east coast of the Ruwenzori mountains and the Semliki river which separate the Congo from Uganda. These are currently called Konzo. They were geographically and administratively separated from their Nande brothers during the division of Africa between the great European powers in 1885. They keep, however, the same habits and customs as the Nande apart from the linguistic nuances in Lhukonzo.

=== The cosmogonic myth of Ruwenzori ===
The Yira tradition relates that one day on the hill of creation, the Creator God O'Muhangitshi answered the prayer of the Nande who were threatened with famine due to a very incendiary drought. He summoned all the heavenly Bhalhimu deities found in the world to protect him. He ordered them to transport the Ruwenzori mountain to plant it in the middle of the Nande country which was terribly short of water.

Hangi the Spirit of Providence and Luck was in the front row followed by Mbolu the protector of female youth and Lusenge the protector of male youth. The Kapipi Spirit, the Master of the forest and of the initiation to wisdom, was in the last row surrounded by his pack of seventy-seven sacred dogs of the hunt. The convoy also included all the goddesses in charge of gifts to be offered as gifts to God Nyamuhanga the Supreme Being as soon as they arrived in the land of the Nande. As the Providence Hangi was walking very fast, the Spirit Muhima the Great Celestial Seer, claimed that he alone carried the Ruwenzori Mountain. The other deities got angry and let go of the Ruwenzori mountain to make the Great Seer Muhima understand that he alone was unable to accomplish this heavy task of transporting a mountain.

To calm their anger, the Spirit of Providence Hangi caused rain to fall on the whole country where the drought was raging. He reconciled all the members of the procession by inviting them to dialogue where everyone was given the floor by the Spirit Mulhekya the Peacemaker, happy to have been refreshed by the celestial shower. When it was the turn of the animals to speak, the smallest of the dogs of the last pack of the deity Kapipi addressed this famous word to the Great Seer Muhima: "you have to know how to count on others". This is why the Ruwenzori massif is still where the gods left it. He has not moved, he continues to make the fresh water of Providence Hangi flow there.

This is the reason why all the rites of reconciliation between the clans begin with the gestures of sprinkling the shoulders and ablution of the feet and the hand with water drawn from the Ruwenzori glacier or Tsithwa -tsya-Nzururu which means the big hill with eternal snow in the local language Kinande.

== Proverbs ==
Yira literature is so vast with many authors mostly priests from the Diocese of Butembo-Beni. Here are some proverbs of wisdom:

1. Akathi kake, kakana lahukira oko mundu kw'amavi = little things can dishonor you.
2. Eyaviriheswa sirivula kathatha kerilima = a hoe is never afraid to plow the field.
3. A'mavwe wosi awo ukatwikalako syalikulangika = all the stones you hit cannot be torn away.
4. Thavwirika mwania o'mwilegha = he who does not listen to the advice of others ends up causing a scandal.
5. A'kanyunyu kamaghuluka kakavirirawa ngoko kaketshira ahisi = when the bird flies, it forgets that it will come down to earth.
6. O'mughunda syalyalotha akasinga oko vwami = the ordinary citizen does not dream of his enthronement as King.
7. Thowa vusindi ni muhumangotho = he who does not understand through proverbs is a...
8. Avali vaviri vo vita mbeva = Those who are together are the ones who kill a rat, unity is strength.
9. Amalw'avaghuma syalivughawako = the quarrel of the brothers, we don't talk about it.
10. Akavuli katowa kakowa omutwe iniali okoliko = who doesn't listen to adult advice realizes it when it's too late.
11. Amabhwe ni manji, lakini amathalyo ni make = the initiates are numerous but the elect are limited.
12. Abhakali ni bhangi ihane owaghu = women are many when you have found yours.
13. Akaghekagheka kyiti = exaggerated possessive money love of one's property kills.
14. Oyo wahola omo thuthuthu mweya e'kulimu ivaviri tshinga, ni kwa, n'oyo wahola o'mwigholo mweya e'kulimu ivaviri tsingula = what is denied on earth will also be denied in heaven and what is accepted on earth will also be accepted into heaven.
15. Erisire riri oko ame rikakwima amaseka = when a loved one commits a mistake or a crime, we don't talk about it.
16. Wamavinya oko vyigha avothathakulu wawu athawyako iukendi kw'embathu = if you walk in the way other than that of your ancestors you will be cursed.
17. Ovwenghemire vukavugha ovwimene = the less clever can harm you.
18. Eriryatsa okomunwe ni sikyawo = to correct or advise a man is to respect him.
19. Thwahikire ngundu ivwe = we let evil approach us.
20. Eriviha ry'embuli murya lheka iyingira omokithegho = let us avoid haste, for fear of being trapped.
21. Oyuthawithe e'mbunda syalivuya vitshindo = when you are weak you do not frighten anyone.
22. Ahaka hika ovuno, ho hatehika omughusu = saying and doing are two different things, action does not follow speech.
23. Akhalhibo ni k'ekwanza n'erithitya ni lhya kaviri = the first thing is to welcome, giving is only the second.
