= Amba people =

Ethnic group in Uganda and Democratic Republic of Congo

Amba
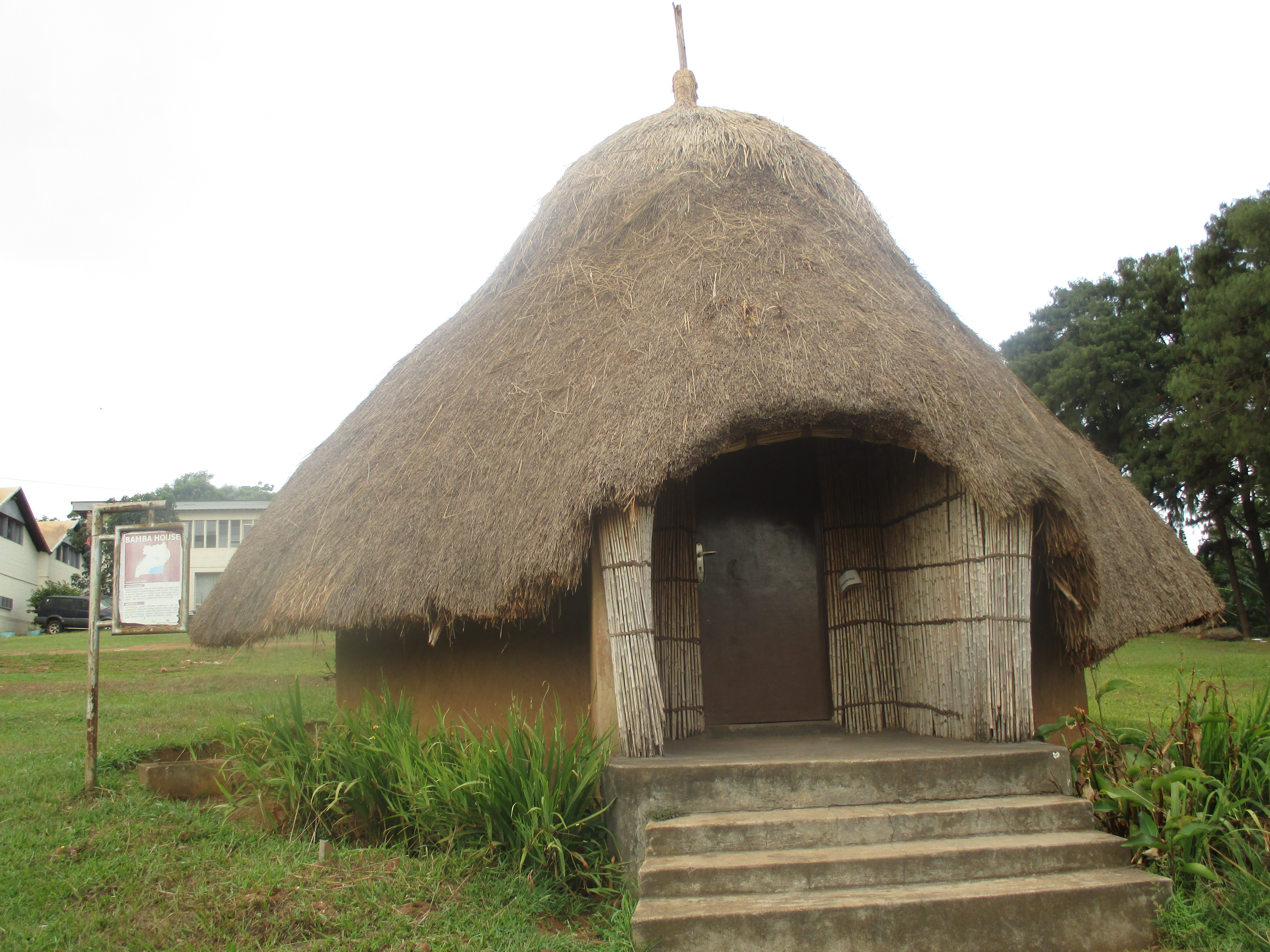

Total population
- ~40,000 (2020 est.)

Regions with significant populations
- Uganda: Bundibugyo District
- DR Congo: Ituri Province

Languages
- Amba, Swahili, English

Religion
- Christianity, Traditional beliefs

Related ethnic groups
- Bakonzo, Banyoro, Bantu peoples

The Amba people, also known as Bwamba or the Bamba, are an indigenous Bantu ethnic group primarily residing in Uganda’s Bundibugyo District, south of Lake Albert, near the Rwenzori Mountains, and across the border in the Ituri Province of the Democratic Republic of Congo. On the Congolese side, they are located in the Watalinga and Bawisa subcounties of Beni, South Kivu. They number 42,559 on the Uganda side in the 2014 census and 4,500 on the Congolese side according to a 1991 SIL International estimate, Ethnologue estimates their total population as 40,100. Agriculturalists, the Baamba traditionally cultivate crops such as bananas, sweet potatoes, and casava, while raising animals like goats. The Baamba practice Christianity.

== Language ==
The Amba language spoken by the Baamba is called, variously, Kwamba by the Baamba themselves and is known as Kihumu in the DR Congo. It has a 70% lexical similarity with Bera. Dialects include Kyanzi (Kihyanzi) and Suwa (Kusuwa). The Amba language belongs to the Niger-Congo language family and it is used as a first language by all adults in the ethnic community.

== Culture ==
In the marriage ceremonies, families would book their spouses earlier in life after an initiation on the boy was done. The initiation process was to transform the boy from childhood to adulthood before puberty. Bride price was paid inform of goats and no marriage was recognized without bride price. Traditionally the Baamba people were hunters and provided food to their families through hunting by the use of bow and arrows.

The Baamba believe misfortune is visited upon them by witches who appear as normal individuals during the day but at night transform themselves into malevolent beings. The primary purpose of these witches is to kill their unwary victims for the sake of human flesh, which they then consume in a mystical fashion so that the corpse shows no outward sign of having been touched.

They are mainly agriculturalists, growing staples like bananas, manioc, and sweet potatoes. They also grow cash crops such as coffee and cotton. Further more, Ethnoreligion - Animism is their primary religion.

== Way of life ==
The Amba are primarily agriculturalists with hoe cultivation. Their mainly grown crop is bananas followed by other crops such as rice, sweet potatoes, cassava, peanuts, yams and pumpkins. They raise goats and sheep for lifestock.

== Politics ==
The Baamba were part of the armed Rwenzururu movement against the Toro Kingdom and central government that reached heights in the mid-1960s and early 1980s. In 2008, the government recognized the Kingdom of Rwenzururu, formed by the Amba and Konjo peoples, as Uganda's first kingdom shared by two tribes.

The Baamba are one of the 65 indigenous communities in Uganda according to the Third Schedule of Uganda's Constitution (Uganda's indigenous communities as at 1 February 1926).

== See also ==
- Babwisi people
- Bafumbira
- Baganda
- Kakwa people
- Karamojong people
- Budibugyo District
