= Charles Mumbere =

- Students from Kyambogo University depict the King of Rwenzururu, the queen and the guards

2nd Omusinga of Rwenzururu
- Reign: 19 October 2009 – present
- Coronation: 19 October 2009
- Predecessor: Isaya Mukirane
- Father: Isaya Mukirane

Charles Wesley Mumbere (born in 1952), known by his royal title Irema-Ngoma I, is the king (known locally as the Omusinga) of Rwenzururu, a subnational kingdom within Uganda. Mumbere was arrested in December 2016 after the clashes in the kingdom's capital of Kasese, and has since been in prison awaiting trial.

== Biography ==
Rwenzururu was established in 1962 as the result of the secessionist Rwenzururu movement by the Bakonzo people in the mountainous region of western Uganda. The revolt was led by Mumbere's father, Isaya Mukirane, who was recognized as the region's king. Mumbere inherited the title at age 13 and assumed the position of king at age 18 on the 19th October 1966.

When he was 30, he made an agreement with the government of Uganda by which the government sent him to the United States for an education. In 1984, at age 30, he enrolled in business school, but his government stipend was cut off. He obtained political asylum in the United States in 1987, received nurse's aide training, and began working in a nursing home in suburban Maryland near Washington, D.C. He later moved to Harrisburg, Pennsylvania where he continued as a nurse's aide.

He kept his royal title secret during most of his 25 years in the United States. In July 2009, Mumbere mentioned his kingship in an interview with The Patriot-News, the primary newspaper of Harrisburg, and said that he was considering returning to Uganda, which had recently recognized Rwenzururu and designated Mumbere as "Omusinga", or king.

In October 2009, Mumbere returned to his homeland, where he was crowned on 19 October. His authority is limited to social and cultural matters.

Because of clashes between Mumbere's guards and Ugandan police, the Kampala government arrested Mumbere on 27 November 2016 and killed 46 of his guards. The clashes resulted in 100 deaths.

Mumbere was granted bail in January 2017, but the case was postponed until June at the request of the prosecutor. In February 2021, the court scheduled pre-trial hearings to begin on 30 March 2021.

In an 2023 amnesty all charges against Mumbere and 217 others were dropped by the Director of Public Prosecution. In 2026 some assets of the2016 raid were still seized.

== Personal life ==
Mumbere is married to Agnes Ithungu and they have four children, Wesley Albert Asimawe and Joyce Furaha. Mumbere's brother is Christopher Kibanzanga. Mumbere's father was Isaya Mukirania.
