= Tembuzi =

Legendary dynasty in Ugandan history

Tembuzi dynasty Oruganda rw'Abatembuzi Gabu dynasty
- Country: Empire of Kitara
- Founder: Kakama, (I)twale or Kintu
- Final ruler: Bukuku

The Tembuzi dynasty was a legendary African dynasty which are said to have once ruled the Empire of Kitara in modern-day Uganda. It was succeeded by the Chwezi dynasty. Traditions concerning the dynasty vary, recording between four and nineteen kings. Many historians have considered the Tembuzi to be somewhat mythical, although there are some scholars who treat them as historical figures. (Note: See and.)

== Etymology ==
The word Abatembuzi is said to derive from the verb -tembura, meaning 'to build in (a) new place(s)', and is thus often translated as "(the) pioneers".

== Legends ==
Note: All traditions in this section are Nyoro traditions unless otherwise specified.

Ruth Alice Fisher wrote that Kakama Twale became the first Tembuzi king, whilst K. W. (Note: stands for Kabalega and Winyi) and John Nyakatura consider Kakama (lit. 'little king') and Twale (Itwale in K. W.'s account) to be separate kings. In their accounts, Kintu was succeeded by Kakama, who was succeeded by (I)twale. John Roscoe and Petero Bikunya only mention "Twale" and "Twari" respectively.

Nyakatura then mentions that Twale's son, Hangi, succeeded him. Roscoe mentions Hangi and Nyamenge being the king after Hangi, although he wrote that there is no more information available about them. In Nyakatura's account, Hangi has two children: Ira lya Hangi (lit. 'long ago of Hangi') and Kazooba ka Hangi (lit. 'little sun of Hangi'). Julien Gorju states that Ira and Kazooba were direct sons of Ruhanga, as Hangi was the Nyoro name for Ruhanga. Nyakatura states that Kazooba succeeded Ira after he died without an heir. Roscoe states that Kabangera succeeded Ira, but there is no more information about him, although some timelines consider Kazooba and Kabangera to be the same person.

In Nyakatura's account, there was a notable population increase during Kazooba's reign, and he was loved by his subjects so much that he was deified after his death and succession by Nyamuhanga. Nyamuhanga was sterile for a long time, so he consulted a witch doctor who told him to marry Nyabagabe, the daughter of Igoro, one of Nyamuhanga's servants. Nyabagabe's son was then named Nkya (lit. 'lucky') by Nyamuhanga. Under Nyamuhanga, there was also an increase in population and he was deified after his death and succession by Nkya I. Due to the similarities between Kazooba and Nyamuhanga, Gorju analyses them as the same person. Nyakatura writes that Nkya I was succeeded by Nkya II, and Nkya II was succeeded by Baba (lit. 'father'). Nkya I also had to consult a witch doctor due to his infertility, and his resultant son was given the same name as him. Due to these similarities, Gorju analyses Nkya I and Nkya II as the same person. Fisher writes that Baba succeeded Kakama, but Roscoe implies that Baba succeeded Kabangera. Carole Ann Buchanan states that Baba was said to be wealthy, having many people and goats, and Fisher states that this prosperity was shared with the ever-increasing populace.

Nyakatura and K. W. write that Baba was succeeded by, in chronological order, Kamuli, Nseka (lit. 'way of laughing'), Kudidi (who reigned for longer than usual), Ntonzi (who put down rebellions, lit. 'wooden sticks'), Nyakahongerwa (lit. 'that which is sacrificed for someone') and Mukonko (who also reigned for longer than usual).All other accounts mentioned beforehand state that Baba was succeeded directly by Mukonko. Regardless, all accounts agree that Mukonko was succeeded by Ngonzaki (Note: also spelt Ngonzaaki) (lit. 'what do I want?', as he was very wealthy) Rutahinduka (lit. 'he who does not turn around').

=== Isaza ===
Isaza

King of the Empire of Kitara
- Predecessor: Ngonzaki
- Successor: Bukuku
- Spouse: Nyamata
- Issue: Isimbwa
- Dynasty: Tembuzi dynasty
- Father: Ngonzaki
- Occupation: Hunter

Isaza (Note: spelt Ishaza in Runyankore) Waraga Rugambanabato Nyakikooto was the last or second-to-last Tembuzi king according to most accounts. (Note: K. W., however, states that Ngonzaki was succeeded by Isaza Mukama, then Isaza Nyakikooto.) As a young monarch, he favored fellow young people over older people, banishing his old counselors and replacing them with young ones. He was also a hunter, and one day, he killed a zebra whilst hunting with his friends, who persuaded Isaza to wear its hide. The hide was sewn with leather thongs and he was delighted by it. When he started hunting again, the sun's heat dried his hide to the point where he felt pain and discomfort. After reporting this to his friends, they mocked him, having no solution to the problem.

In Nyakatura's account, some of Isaza's friends then told Koogere (Isaza's aunt) and Nyangoma (his sister) about the situation. Koogere and Nyangoma summoned some of their old servants to rescue Isaza. Once there, the servants ordered Isaza's friends to dip him in a river, and they did so. In Fisher's account, there were two old counselors who managed to avoid exile. Isaza sent a message to them asking what he should do, but they refused and told him to consult his young counselors. However, one of the two men relented, saying they should save Isaza for the sake of his father, Ngonzaki. So they ordered Isaza's young men to bring Isaza into their house, where they threw him into a pond. In all accounts, the hide was loosened enough for the old men to cut the thongs and release Isaza, thereby saving his life. Isaza was so grateful that he threw a banquet to celebrate the elderly, reinstating their positions as counselors and telling the youth to respect their elders.

Isaza was also said to be the first king to divide Kitara into counties (amasaza, sing. isaza).

==== Nyamiyonga ====
Nyamiyonga (Note: also spelt Nyamiyongo (Fisher)) (lit. 'black soot') was the king of the underworld (Okuzimu) in Nyoro traditions. In Nkore traditions, he is called Ruyonga and was the king of Nkore.

Nyamiyonga was said to have sent one messenger or multiple messengers to present to Isaza several riddles, from which Isaza was meant to deduce what Nyamiyonga wanted from him: that which announces the dawn (enteerabwire), that which does not finish the job (entamara omulimo), the rope that binds water (omuguha oguboha amaizi), that which makes Isaza turn (ekihindura Isaza), that which is unknown (ekitamanywa) and the little door of poverty (akaigi k'enaku), although the fourth riddle is absent from Bikunya's account. Isaza, baffled by the riddles, called a meeting with his counselors to figure out the meaning of them, but this meeting solved nothing. It eventually transpired that either Koogere (per Nyakatura) or the "queen of Isaza" (per Fisher) had a maid called Kazana (lit. 'serving maid') who claimed to be able to solve the riddles. Kazana requested that various objects and animals be brought to her, and explained that the cock announces the dawn, a dog does not finish the job as it was given a smoking pipe but only stared at it, the rope that binds water is millet flour as it absorbs the water it is cooked in, a calf makes Isaza turn after it lowed, a baby is unknown as it sat on Isaza's lap and scratched his face and wetted his clothes and a blood pact is the door that shuts out poverty because if someone is poor, they can rely on their blood brother for help.

Kazana suggested that Isaza should make a blood pact with Nyamiyonga, but Isaza was unsure about it and asked his chiefs for advice. Fisher writes that his chiefs advised him not to do it because making a blood pact with someone from the underworld would be "fearful", so they urged him to choose someone to do it on his behalf. Thus, Isaza sent his servant Kwezi (lit. 'the Moon') to do so. Nyakatura gives the name of a particular chief, Kyarunda, who advised Isaza not to do it because he has never met nor seen Nyamiyonga. Isaza agreed, but since customs say that one should not reject an offer of friendship, Isaza sent his gatekeeper Bukuku to do it for him. When Nyamiyonga heard about the deception, either from his messengers (per Nyakatura) or a servant who accompanied his messengers (per Fisher), accounts agree that he was angry as he became the blood brother of a commoner (omwiru, i.e. a descendant of Kairu). He was determined to bring Isaza into his control, so he dispatched Nyamata (lit. 'of milk'), the most beautiful of his daughters, to Isaza's palace in order to trick Isaza into going into the underworld. Whilst Fisher says that Bukuku asked where she came came from and she said "from yonder," Nyakatura implies that Bukuku did not bother to interrogate her due to her beauty. Regardless, accounts agree that when Bukuku told Isaza about Nyamata's beauty, Isaza sent her sister Runyunyuzi to inspect said beauty, and she said there was no one more beautiful in the kingdom than her. When he eventually met Nyamata, Isaza loved her so much that he took her as a wife.

Nyamata eventually figured out that Isaza loved his cattle more than her, although when and how she did this varies among accounts. Nyakatura says that one day she asked him directly what he loves more, and Isaza answered that he loves both equally. Later, when they were sitting together, his cattle strayed towards their direction, and Isaza suddenly got up and went to find out how they were. Nyamata was furious, and he told her to not be angry, saying that he loses all sense of proportion when he sees cows. Fisher says that during the "time for milking", they were standing in the doorway watching cattle being brought in, and Isaza followed the cows into a shed. Nyamata told him that he should not leave her alone, but Isaza said that he want to see his cows. That evening, Nyamata refused to attend to him, so Isaza sent a messenger to her, saying that although he loves her over all his wives, he loves his cows more. Regardless, after figuring this out, Nyamata went back to the underworld and told Nyamiyonga about Isaza's love for cattle, where she then gave birth to a boy called Isimbwa.

Nkore tradition, as recorded by Roscoe, says that Isimbwa was the son of Nyamate and Rugaba. Aaron Mushengyezi states that Isimbwa was the son of Ruyonga's daughter and Ishaza, aligning more with Nyoro traditions.

Nyamiyonga decided to choose two of his best cattle from his herds, a bull called Ruhogo (lit. 'reddish-brown bull') and a cow called Kahogo (lit. 'little reddish-brown bull'), and he sent them to Isaza's palace. When Isaza saw them, he loved them over any other cows in his herd. One day, Ruhogo and Kahogo ran away to Nyamiyonga's palace. Isaza followed them into the underworld, where he was reunited with Nyamata and Isimbwa. However, Nyamiyonga prevented him from ever leaving the underworld as punishment for joining him with a commoner in a blood pact.

=== Bukuku ===
Bukuku

King of the Empire of Kitara
- Predecessor: Isaza
- Successor: Ndahura
- Issue: Nyinamwiru
- Dynasty: Tembuzi dynasty

Bukuku was the last Tembuzi king, notable for being the only Tembuzi king from a clan other than the Gabu clan, the Ranzi clan. After proclaiming himself king, the chiefs of most of the counties rebelled against him, as Bukuku was a commoner (omwiru), and the people did not think he deserved to be king. Fisher states that Bukuku had to retreat to the south-west of Kitara and Bikunya states that Bukuku only ruled over Kikwenusi, Kisegwe and Kijagarazi, although the location of said places are unknown.

Bukuku's only child was a daughter called Nyinamwiru (Note: also spelt Nyinamuiri (Fisher)) (lit. 'commoner mother'). One day, witch-doctors came to Bukuku and either advised him to kill Nyinamwiru because her beauty would bring misfortune (per Nyakatura) or advised him to prevent her from marrying because her son would kill Bukuku (per Fisher). When she grew older, he built a house for her that could only be entered through Bukuku's palace in order to seclude her from the outside world. To attend to her needs, he also gave Nyinamwiru either a maid called Mugizi or two servants; an old man and his wife. Nyakatura writes that Bukuku also cut off one of her breasts and gouged out one of her eyes to make her less attractive, whilst Fisher writes that she was born with only one eye and one ear and that he consulted the witch-doctors because of these birth defects.

== Family tree ==
Tembuzi family tree (per Fisher)
Tembuzi kings

Ruhanga	Nkya
Kairu	Kakama	Kahuma	Kantu
Baba
Mukonko
Ngonzaki	Nyamiyongo
Bukuku	Isaza	Nyamata
Nyinamuiri	Isimbwa

Tembuzi family tree (per Nyakatura)
Tembuzi kings

Kintu	Kati
Kairu	Kahuma	Kakama
Twale
Hangi
Ira	Kazooba
Nyabagabe	Nyamuhanga
Nkya I
Nkya II
Baba
Kamuli
Nseka
Kudidi
Ntonzi
Nyakahongerwa
Mukonko
Ngonzaki	Nyamiyonga
Bukuku	Runyunyuzi	Nyangoma	Isaza	Nyamata
Nyinamwiru	Isimbwa
