= Isaya Mukirania =

1st Omusinga of Rwenzururu
- Reign: 30 June 1963 – 2 September 1966
- Coronation: 30 June 1963
- Predecessor: Monarchy established
- Successor: Charles Mumbere
- Died: 2 September 1966

Isaya Mukirania (also spelled Isaya Mukirane, d. 2 September 1966), known by his royal title Kibanzanga I, was a Ugandan secessionist leader and non-sovereign monarch who served as the leader of the Rwenzururu movement during the 1960s, and was the first Omusinga (king) of the Kingdom of Rwenzururu on 30 June 1963 (Coronation date). He was formally succeeded by his son Charles Mumbere over 43 years after his death, on 19 October 2009.

Isaya died on 2 September 1966. He was buried on Bulemba peak with in the Rwenzori Mountains.

In 1953, Isaya founded the Bakonzo Cultural Research Association.
