= Uganda Muslim Liberation Army =

- Dates active: 1995–1996
- Headquarters: Buganda
- Active regions: Uganda–Zaire border
- Ideology: Muslim interests in Buganda
- Wars: the aftermath of the Ugandan Bush War

The Uganda Muslim Liberation Army (abbreviated UMLA) was a Muslim rebel group in Uganda. Its fighters were mainly from among the Baganda ethnic group's Muslim minority along with some non-Baganda Muslims. The group was formed in 1995 in opposition to the Museveni government after accusing it of persecuting Muslims in Buganda.

== History ==
The UMLA formally declared war on Yoweri Museveni's Ugandan government in January 1995. In February 1995, the group launched its first military operations near Lake Albert, which failed and resulted in their retreat to Zaire (present-day the Democratic Republic of Congo).

Museveni denounced the rebels as Islamic fundamentalists, whose sole purpose was to destabilize the Great Lakes Region as "agents of [Sudan's] NIF government". The self-proclaimed purpose of the UMLA was to topple Museveni's government and stop the alleged mistreatment of Muslims in Buganda by them. The UMLA claimed that Museveni's National Resistance Army (NRA) had committed war crimes and massacres against Muslims during the Ugandan Bush War, a claim which Museveni denies.

In 1996, the UMLA merged with the Allied Democratic Movement, remnants of the National Army for the Liberation of Uganda (NALU), and militant members of the local Tablighi Jamaat to form the Allied Democratic Forces, allegedly with assistance from the Sudanese government. Despite not waging a significant insurgency, the group was a primary focus of bitter relations between the Sudanese and Ugandan governments.
