= Omusinga of Rwenzururu =

Royal title given to the monarchs of the Kingdom of Rwenzururu

- Omusinga wa Rwenzururu
- Coat of Arms of Rwenzururu

Incumbent
- Irema-Ngoma I since 19 October 2009

Details
- Style: His Majesty
- Heir apparent: None
- First monarch: Kibanzanga I
- Formed: 30 June 1963
- Residences: Buhikira Royal Palace, Kasese

Omusinga of Rwenzururu (Konjo: Omusinga wa Rwenzururu) is the royal title given to the monarchs of the Kingdom of Rwenzururu. The title was technically held by Charles Mumbere for over 43 years after the first Omusinga, his father Isaya Mukirania, died in 1966. However, Mumbere was not formally crowned and recognised by the Ugandan government until 2009.

== List of Abasinga ==
1. 1963–1966: Isaya Mukirania (Kibanzanga I)
2. 2009–present: Charles Mumbere (Irema-Ngoma I)

== See also ==
- Rwenzururu movement
- Konjo people
