= Amon Bazira =

Ugandan politician and Pan-Africanist

Personal details
- Born: 1944
- Died: August 1993 (aged 48–49)
- Party: NALU
- Other political affiliations: UPC (until 1985)

Amon Bazira (sometimes referred to as Amon Kabunga Bazira; 1944–1993) was a Ugandan Pan-Africanist leader and an organiser who created an extensive intelligence network that was a clandestine component of the struggle to end the regime of Ugandan military dictator and president, Idi Amin. After helping to remove Idi Amin, Bazira served as Deputy Director of intelligence, and then as Director of Intelligence in Uganda in 1979. He produced a government report predicting that there would be a massive genocide in Rwanda that would lead to the collapse of order in Central and Eastern Africa, and proposed granting citizenship to Rwandan refugees and other displaced Africans in Uganda, as a means of preventing genocidal warfare. In August 1993, Amon Bazira was assassinated in between Nairobi and Nakuru in Kenya.

== Background and education ==
Amon Bazira studied at Bwera Junior Secondary School then Nyakasura School in present day Fort Portal. He later joined Makerere University where he offered Philosophy, History and Law and graduating in 1970.

== Career ==
Amon Bazira served as Member of Parliament for the then Kasese West Constituency between 1980 and 1985. He also served as the deputy minister for Lands, Water and Surveys in the Obote II administration, a position he occupied until the fall of this administration on July 27, 1985.

== Personal life ==
Amon Bazira was married to Mary Bazira and is the father of Daniel Bazira Kashagama, who was appointed King of Busongora Kingdom.

He was also father-in-law to Obiora Chinedu Okafor through his daughter Annette Atugonza.
