= Konjo people =

Ethnic group in eastern Democratic Republic of the Congo and western Uganda

Bakonzo
- Rwenzururu flag

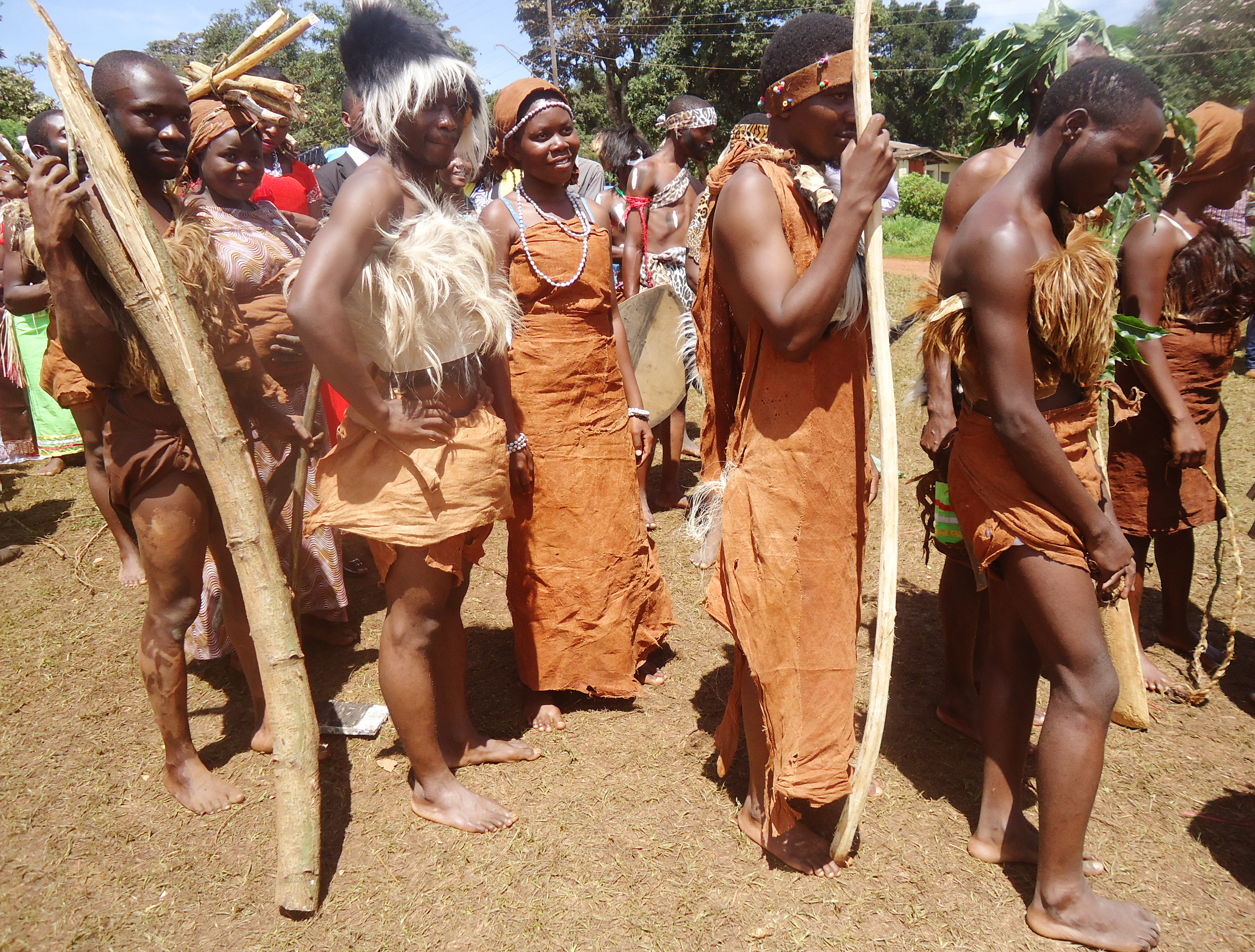
- Traditional wear of the Bakonzo

Total population
- 1,464,000

Regions with significant populations
- Rwenzori Mountains of southwest Uganda
- Uganda: 1,118,000
- DRC: 346,000

Languages
- Konjo, English

Religion
- Christianity, Islam and Traditional African religions

Related ethnic groups
- Nande people and other Bantu peoples

The Konjo, BaKonzo (pl. Bakonzo, sing. Mukonzo), or Konzo are a Bantu ethnic group located in the Rwenzori region of Southwest Uganda in districts that include; Kasese, Bundibugyo, Bunyangabu and Ntoroko districts.

The Bankonzo are also known as the Bayiira or Banande or Abanyarwenzururu and they are composed of 14 Clans and different totems. (Ebihanda 14 ebyaba'yiira n'emitsiro).

They speak the Konjo language and practice traditional religions, Islam and Christianity. Konzo speakers also live on the Western slopes of the Rwenzori range in the Democratic Republic of the Congo.

Numbering 850,646 in the 2014 census, they live on the plains, hills and mountain sloping up to an altitude of 2,200 meters in the Rwenzori Mountains. Traditionally agriculturalists and animal husbanders, they farm yams, beans, sweet potatoes, peanuts, soy beans, potatoes, rice, wheat, cassava, coffee, bananas, Cocoa and cotton, while keeping goats, sheep, and poultry.

== Religion ==
According to the 2002 Census of Uganda, 44.1% of Bakonzo are Anglican (Church of Uganda), 28.7% are Roman Catholic, 15.4% are Seventh-day Adventist, 6.9% are Muslim, 3.1 are Pentecostal and 1.5% follow other religions.

== History ==
The Konzo were part of the armed Rwenzururu movement against the Toro Kingdom and central government that reached heights in the mid-1960s and early 1980s. In 2008, the government recognized the Rwenzururu Kingdom, formed by the Konjo and Amba peoples, as Uganda's first kingdom shared by two tribes.

Since July 2014, secessionist ambitions have led to armed clashes in which dozens have died. Rwenzururu kingdom has witnessed episodes of bloodshed the recent notable one being that of November 2016; a conflict between the government of the republic of Uganda and the Rwenzururu kingdom. This conflict saw the death of hundreds of people and others arrested including the king His Majesty Charles Mumbere and his then prime minister Thembo Kistumbire.Houses of both the Bankonzo and Bamba/Babwisi were burnt.

Notable Bakonjo include Amon Bazira, a political figure instrumental in the negotiations that ended the 1980s conflict, and Charles Mumbere, named the Omusinga (king), of the Rwenzururu Kingdom. A very known Mukonzo is also Musa Baluku the leader of the ISCAP (Islamic State - Central Africa Province).

== Origin ==
Legend has it that the Bakonzo once lived on Mount Elgon in Eastern Uganda and that during the Kintu migrations, the Bakonzo came with Kintu to Buganda. However, rather than settle in Buganda, the Bakonzo are said to have decided to continue until they finally settled on the western highlands of Mt. Rwenzori which had a similar climate to that of Mt. Elgon where they had originally lived. This is said to have been around A.D. 1300.

Another tradition asserts that the Bakonzi have lived on Mount Rwenzori from time immemorial and that they have no foreign place of origin. This tradition asserts that the ancestor of the Bakonzo emerged from one of the caves of Mount Rwenxori and produced the rest of the Bakonzo.

== Writing system ==
Konjo alphabet of Kambale (2007)
a	b	d	e	f	g	h	i	k	l	m	n	o	p	q	r	s	t	u	v	w	y	z

Konjo alphabet of minister of Education of Uganda
a	b	bb	d	e	f	g	gh	gy	h	i	ï	k	ky	l	lh	m	mb	n
nd	ng	ngy	nt	ny	nz	o	p	r	s	t	th	ts	u	ü	v	w	y	z

== Children naming ==
The Bakonzo name their children according to the precedence of birth where by each surname indicates someone's birth rank or birth order that is whether the child is the first born, second born up to the last born. The boys have eight names whereas the girls have eight names.

=== Male given names ===
1. A first born is named Baluku or Mutoha, and Nzeruku when some of the grandparents on either side of the parents are dead. However, if both the paternal and maternal grandparents are still alive by the time a boy child is born, he is named Mumbere or Kambere or Kasoke.
2. A second born is named Bwambale or Mbaju or "Tsongo" or Kombi orKambasu or Kambale
3. A third born is named Masereka or Marahi or Maate or Kabuhyahya are the short forms.
4. A fourth born is named Kuule also missplessed as Kule.
5. A fifth born is named Thembo or Kathembo.
6. A sixth born is named Mbusa or Kabusa.
7. A seventh born is named Tsongo.
8. An eighth born is named Ndungu, and he is also expected to be the last boy.
9. However, any child born after Ndungu, he is given any other name of choice.

Female given names

1. The first born baby girl is named Masika. However, the first-born baby girl may be named Musoki if both the paternal and maternal grandparents are still alive by the time a child is born.
2. The second born girl named is Biira or Kabiira (where the "ka" stands for small, meaning Kabiira stands for "small Biira")
3. The third born girl is named Kabugho or Kaswera.
4. The fourth born girl is named Mbambu or Kahambu (where the "ka" stands for small). or Kapambu
5. The fifth born is named Ithungu or Kathungu
6. The sixth born is named Kyakimwa.
7. The seventh born is named Nziabake also misspelled as Nzyabake
8. The eighth born is named Bulubasa also misspelled Balhubasa as and is expected to be the last born girl. The eight female child can also be named Kalibanda or Kathya.

=== Abahasa (twins) given names ===
1. The elder twin is named Nguru while the other is Ndobya regardless of the sex.
2. If both twins are male, the elder twin can be named Isingoma and the young one can be named Kato.
3. If both twins are female, the elder twin can be Nyangoma and the young twin is named Nyakato.
4. Children born after twins are named Kitsa (also written as Kiiza), followed by Kamalha then followed by Karumba or Kibaba then followed by Nzangura regardless of the sex.
5. If a mother gives birth to both male and female, the elder twin if a male is named either Nguru or Isingoma and the female is named Nyakato or Ndobya.
6. If a mother gives birth to both male and female and the first twin is a female, she is named either Nguru or Nyangoma and the male is named either Ndobya or Kato.
7. Nyabahasa is the name given to the mother of twins.
8. Isebahasa is the name given to the father of twins.

=== Other Bakonzo names ===
1. Muhindo or Kahindo is a name given to a male or female child when the parents have produced a different gender for the first time say from male(s) to female(s) or female(s) to male(s).
2. Mbindule is given to a baby girl when parents give birth to their first female child after giving birth to a male(s) first.
3. Kanyere is a name given to a female produced if both parents were virgins when they married.
4. Nzanzu aka Nzazwa is a name given to a male produced if both parents were virgins when they married.
5. Bethubanji is a name given to a first born child regardless of sex if both its grandparents alive at the same time their parents are also living.
6. Akatsukulhu is a name given to a child who has two generational grandparents.
7. Kibaya, Kyithi, Bisogho, Kamabu, Bityabitya or Bisiika/Kyirere are names given to a male child(ren) who have been born after the death of an elder child(ren).
8. Mutsuba, Bisiika, Bighasaki (loosely translated as "you are useless compared to the dead one") and Kyabu (loosely translated as "dustbin") are names that may be given to a baby girl born after the death of an elder child(ren).
9. Muthende is a name given to a child when boys had gone for a circumcision initiation ceremony.
10. Byerire is a name for child born during time of great harvest.
11. Other names translated from other languages such as Runyankole include; Lwanzu from Rukundo (a Runyankole word meaning Love), Athwanzire from Natukunda (a Runyankole word meaning "He loves Us") and Apipawe from Ahimbisibwe (a Runyankole word meaning "He should be praised")
12. Sibendire which is translated as they don't want him.
13. Baswekire which is translated as people mock you.
14. Balinandi which is translated as on whose side are they, a name that is given to children whose mothers had been mocked for infertility.

=== More about Bankonzo naming ===
1. The names Musoki and Mumbere are given to children when their parents are officially married.
2. If you give to birth boys first and then give birth to a girl, her name will be Muhindo and the girl after her (Muhindo) will be called Biira because she is the girl to be born in that family.
3. Events such as locust attacks, massacres and death also attract some names. For the Bakonzo, the completeness of life is embodied in the acceptance of death. The Bakonzo take the dead as more superior than the living, thus a child born after a deceased child is viewed as inferior.
4. Nzyabake and Balhubasa are now very uncommon names because these days there are not many women who give birth to six or seven daughters.
5. Whereas all ordinal names are prescriptive (root words with no explanation), Nzyabake, Balhubasa and Kithawithelina are descriptive adjectives. Nzyabake loosely means "I have few left" while Balhubasa means "in plenty".
6. There is likelihood of having two Baluku(s) or Bwambale(s) in a polygamous families because every mother has a first born or second born.
7. Male children can be given female children names.

== Family break down ==
The Bakonzo families are broken down into a Nuclear family and also an extended family. Among the Bakonzo, the uncles are also called fathers by the children. And also the wives of the uncles are called mothers by the children whether they are the one who gave birth to them or not.

Family break down among the Bakonzo
Title (English)	Description	Family type
Father	a man in relation to his child or children	Nuclear Family
Mother	a woman in relation to his child or children	Nuclear Family
Son	a boy or man in relation to either or both of his parents	Nuclear Family
Daughter	a girl or woman in relation to either or both of his parents	Nuclear Family
Aunt	a sister of one's father or mother or the wife or female partner of one's uncle	Extended family
Uncle	a brother of one's father or mother or the husband or male partner of one's aunt	Extended family
Cousin	a child of your aunt or uncle, or a relative who is more distant than an immediate relation like your brother or sister	Extended family
Niece	A niece is the daughter of a person's brother or sister	Extended family
Nephew	a nephew is the son of a person's brother or sister	Extended family
Grandfather	a father of one's father or mother	Extended family
Grandmother	a mother of one's father or mother	Extended family
Great-grandfather	a father of one's grandparent	Extended family
Great-grandmother	a mother of one's grandparent	Extended family

== Clans and their totems ==
The Bankonzo are also known as the Bayiira or Banande or Abanyarwenzururu and they have 14 clans and different totems. (Ebihanda 14 ebyaba'yiira n'emitsiro).

The clans have to protect their totems as in they are not allowed to harm, kill or eat their totems.

Each of the Bakonzo clan has another Bankonzo clan which they regard as their "fake enemy". For example, the Bakira's "fake enemy" are the Bahira clan.

The "Abasu Banyangalba" is the royal clan. If someone is not born from the royal clan, he shall never become Omusinga of Rwenzururu.

Konjo Clans and totems
Clan	Totem in Lhukonzo	Totem in English
Abahira	Entajumba	Crested guineafowl
Abahira	Enganga	Crested guineafowl
Abasu (males) / Abasukali (Females)	Engabi	Bushbuck
Abasu (males) / Abasukali (Females)	Ekisukali	Brown sparrow
Abahambu	Enyange	Egret
Abaswagha	Engwe	Leopard
Ababinga	Ebakwe	Baboon
Abasongora (not the cattle keepers' tribe)	Omushenene	Grasshopper
Abathangyi	Ekibandu	Chimpanzee
Abathangyi	Endeghethegheni	Domestic dog
Abanyisanza	Enzoghu	Elephant
Abalegha	Engeya	Colobus monkey
Abakyira	Embogho	Buffalo
Abaseru	Entajumba	Crested guineafowl
Abahinda	Engende	Monkey
Abalhumba	Embulhi mulhime	Black Sheep
Abakunda	Enyamulhime	Pangolin

== Bakonzo ceremonies/rituals ==
=== Eribania (circumcision) ritual ===
A Mukonzo male is not considered a man if is not circumcised and he may not marry because Bakonzo women are not usually attracted to uncircumcised men and also no family would give out their daughter to a man who is not circumcised. Most of the male children are circumcised when they were between the ages of 8 and 18.

The Bankozo had an annual mass circumcision ceremony/ritual called "Olhusumba" but it was last held in 1973 after it was challenged by the Christianity that was growing in the Rwenzori region back then but it is being revived. And this made parents to start taking their boys to hospitals or inviting people who can circumcise to their homes. The same ritual is held by the Nandi community of the Eastern Democratic Republic of Congo, Bamba/Babwisi tribes. The ritual took a period of one to two months.

The Abathende or Bathende (candidates to be circumcised) were grouped together and made Olhuthende (match/pilgrimage to the Olhusumba ceremonial venue).

When a mukonzo circumicised man died, a special tradition dance called "Omukumu" was performed among his final funeral rights. The dance was only performed by circumcised men where allowed to dance with women and also do the drumming. A cleansing ceremony had to first be done for those men who did not do Olhuthende as his penis was not designed with dots around it.

Among the Bankonzo, erabania is not only practiced for health reasons but it also believed that it improves the sexual performance of a male. Erabania is also believed to turn boys into brave and fearless men do the fact they bare the pain circumcision and also treat the wound with only herbs and water.

Olhusumba was not for babies but boys between the age of 8 and 18.

Olhusumba site contained one hut called "Omupinda" which is located near or at a river and it would be purposely constructed for that ceremony and dismantle it after the ceremony. The river was used as a treatment place. Twice a day that is every morning and evening, the Bathande had to sit in cold river water as part of their healing process and they had to go back home after they have completely healed. The healing process took one to two months.

There were taboos connected with the Olhusumba such as;

- The parents of the Abathende were not to have sexual intercourse until their boys returned home
- No quarrels were allowed with in the home as this would make the Abathende wounds not to heal.
- After circumcision, no woman was allowed to see any of the Abathende as they would prolonged their healing process.
- A mukonzo man would not be allowed to be circumcised by a fellow Mukonzo.

Women would only be allowed at the Olhusumba site only at the beginning of the ceremony to participate in the traditional dance called "Omukumu" and also on the last day of ceremony when the "new men" (the Abathende who had completely healed) are ushered out of the Omupinda. Only the women who danced the Omukumu where allowed to dismantled the Omupinda.

And after the dance the circumcised men were allowed to go home. The parents of the child who has shown no healing progress or any signs of scabies would be fined as a punishment for invading culture.

Some of the factors that lead to the ending of the ritual included;

- Religious beliefs and traditions. Most people did not wait for the ritual as Muslims also practiced circumcision as a sign of their faith.
- Circumcising babies at birth in hospitals.
- Spreading of Christianity. The missionaries called some rituals such as Olhusumba unbiblical and also satanic.
- Banning of the circumcision rituals in 1975 among non-Muslims by Idi Amin Dada because he thought the rituals covered up military operations and trainings.
- The coming of the colonialists.

=== Erithahya (marriage) ritual ===
The Bakonzo still carry out traditional marriages. The marriage among the Bakonzo required a man to be circumcised. And all unmarried girls where required to be virgins. Girls who become pregnant before marriage would be executed. Early child marriages and also cross generational marriage exist among the Bakonzo that is someone of 50+ years marrying someone in their early 20s. Premarital sex was prohibited among the Bakonzo.

==== Booking of the spouses ====
Booking of the spouses at an early age was carried out between two families that were living close to each other. In the old days, parents had to choose the girl (Omwalyana) for their son after doing more research about the girl's family. The boy had no choice in choosing his bride/wife (Omwalyana) to be. And it was the responsibility of the girl's family to also do research about the boy's family whether he is hard working and well behaved. It was believed that if two children from two well behaved families married, they would produce children of good character as that of their parents.

Parents were also allowed to book for a girl even if that family (Erihiika) has not yet produced any girl and to confirm their interest, the family of the boy would take a goat's or Sheep skin that was soften using oil of Embono to the family head of the chosen family to show that they have booked any girl that shall be produced from that family especially when the wife to the head of the family is pregnant. And if a boy is produced, still the family that brought the skin, will be patiently waiting until a girl is produced. When a girl child is produced, it was the goat's or sheep's skin that would be used to carry that born girl child on the back until she grows up to a certain age. To make that skin, a goat or sheep would be skinned from its neck up to its hooves, and it was that skin from the legs that would be used as straps but they would still be part of the skin.

When a girl that was booked reached the age of 8, she would be informed about the home she would be married to and once in a while, she would be sent to the home of the family that booked her to deliver somethings or even to play and grow up the other kids of that home to learn their behaviour and how they do certain things until when she reached the age of 10 and be officially be handed over to that family. But she would not be staying with her husband to be because, the boy would also be in the range of 12 to 14 years but she would be sleeping in the back or behind her mother-in-law (Mabyalha) on the same bed with father-in-law (Tatabyalha) until she reached the age of in between 14 and 16 depending on how faster the parents-in-law want that girl to be married to their son and start their family. The girl is trained and groomed by her mother-in-law on marital affairs such as what is expected of her by her husband, what is she supposed to do and when, how she is supposed to handle her man, how to handle challenges, or even seek guidance among other affairs.

When the parents-in-law felt that it was time for their children to start a family, the father-in-law would go and cut down poles and a bundle of reeds (Esiiseke) and take the boy to where he will construct a house where he will stay with his wife. This process is called Erityandilha. After he constructs then he is given the girl. If the girl felt uncomfortable in her new house, she go back and sleep with her mother-in-law who later convinces her to go back to her husband's house.

The traditional marriages that started that way lasted longer because of the strong bonds and family ties that were created from childhood to adulthood. But nowadays, both the boy and a girl are raised from their families. But when a boy and a girl pick interest in each other, the boy/man gives a letter to a girl confirming that he has loved her and he will marry her. And when she agrees, a man is supposed to give her a gift "Ekisiimo" which is not supposed to be a fixed amount but it can be anything that a man feels that the woman he has chosen deserves from the bottom of his heart within his providing means and no one is supposed to dictate what amount he will give for Ekisiimo because someone is supposed to live within his means and they should not be over expectant of man.

But in the old days, the "Ekisiimo" used to be money. It is the Ekisiimo that the woman would use to introduce his relationship with her to her parents whether to a mother or father but most women inform their mothers, she would use Ekisiimo to buy for herself new things such as clothes, and also she would give some of the Ekiisimo to her aunt (Songali wesonga) who will take her for marriage. But the woman (bride to be) is supposed to declare how much she was given to her mother and also what she has spent and on what things/items. From the share she gave her mother, her mothers uses some of the money to buy for her father a present or something he wants because it is her mother that knows what her husband wants.

After the girl/woman (bride to be) informs her mother about the man she has chosen to be her husband and also the time when they are ready to visit her family. The mother later informs her husband about her daughters marriage issue while she also presents the present she bought using her share from the ekisiimo. And then research about the man to be their son-in-law is done such as the family background. And a feedback which can be a letter or verbal message is sent back to the man's (husband to be) family through their daughter with the agreed upon time when they should come and visit them and get to know them better.

==== Erisunga (Introduction ceremony aka meeting the girl's family for the first time) ====
The purpose of Erisunga is to know where the woman (bride to be) is born from and also to discuss about the dowry (Omukagha) or bride price that a man's (groom to be) family is supposed to take to the woman's family to be able to marry their daughter. It is only the woman's (bride to be) family that is supposed to cater for all the costs of the erisunga ceremony without any help from the man's (groom to be) family. It is only the Abatatha (the father and Uncles of the groom-to-be) that go for this function. The groom-to-be is not supposed to attend this function. The girl's family may accept or reject the family of the boy after making research about their family. And if a girl or boy insisted on marrying each other after being rejected by the family then they would not get blessings from their parents.

On the agreed upon dates for erisunga, the groom-to-be's family is supposed to bring Ekongotha (this is local brew known as Tonto in Ekisya (a big calabash that can accommodate 40 litres or two jerry cans of 20 litres each)) but nowadays it depends on the family you are visiting on that day basing on religion and also beliefs, some Bakonzo families prefer crates of soda (which must be not more than 3) and crates of beer. When the groom-to-be's family reaches the bride-to-be's home, the one carrying the Ekongotha is helped to lift it down, and he or she is supposed to take a sip of the Ekongotha (Engotho) to show the girl's family that it is safe to drink that is that it the Ekongotha does not contain poison or anything suspicious that might harm their family and that the tonto is ready and well prepared. And also the person chosen by the bride-to-be's family uses the same cup to taste the Ekongotha to confirm that it is safe for other family members to drink. The purpose of the Ekongotha was to soften the hearts of the people in the meeting so that they do not hike the dowry items to check whether you can manage it or by someone who does not want you to get married in their family. Erisunga also requires a Fumura kigambo (ice breaker for the dowry conversation) which is a physical goat and it is slaughtered in case the bride-to-be's family had not yet slaughtered another animal.

==== Erithahya (marriage) ====
The Bakonzo marriage is only recognised after the Omukagha (dowry or bride price) that was agreed upon during the Erisunga has been paid to the girl's family on the day of erithahya. And the groom-to-be would go with his family on the agreed upon dates to the girl's home and hand over the Omukagha to the bride-to-be's family and a celebration that involves eating and dancing is carried out amdist the witnesses of their marriage.

When the bride is leaving to go to her husband home after the marriage ceremony, her entire family sits in a circular form/arrangement and every family member carries her on their thighs/laps until reaches the last person (who is usually the head of that family) who hugs her for the last time. That is why most Bakonzo married women are not allowed to hug their fathers and also be carried by them because they hugged them for their last time indicating that she has officially become a member of her husband's family and that is where she will be buried no matter what happens to them.

The goats are always passed through the house where the dowry meeting was held and if the goats urinated in the process of passing through the house, it was a sign of good omen. If goats hesitated passing thorough the house, water would be poured on them so they passed through the house.

If a woman got pregnant and the process of paying dowry was in progress and her family learns of the pregnancy then a goat called Embene eye Eyakibanga is slaughtered and its blood is let to flow on the ground before it is even entered into the house to act as a sacrifice to the gods but currently the tradition is no longer practiced. The Embene ye Kibanga was slaughtered to prevent prolonged pregnancies, spending a long time during labour, failure to produce, operations during birth and even death during birth.

If a mukonzo man marries a woman from the same clan, Embene yo Buwuma is slaughtered and the blood was let to flow on the ground to cleanse any curse that would come as a result of that marriage. It was believed that if one married a person of his or her clan, then the blood would "fight" and the wife would get miscarriages, or even the wife would not produce or even she would give to babies would later die. The slaughter symbolised that the other relationship of brother and sister had been ended and they were not supposed to annoy or hurt each other not matter the differences that came up. This tradition is still practiced in these days.

===== Omukagha =====
The Omukagha includes 12 Ebisya of Tonto (or 24 jerry cans of 20 litres each which can also be 12 crates of soda and 12 crates of beer), 12 goats (which can be all physical goats or some as physical and others in form of money that is agreed upon), a hoe (Eyisuuka), bed sheets wrapped in a blanket, a mattress, a goat for the mother-in-law and Omuseye wa Maama. In the old days, the Omuseye wa maama was a metallic silver or gold wrist band to confirm that confirmation that you have made an agreement with that family to last for eternity. But in these days, Omuseye wa maama includes: a gomesi, shoes, Ekikoye (thick cotton fabric worn underneath), Ekitambalha kyo kwamutwe (a cloth that covers on the head), a gomesi sash and also a money of any amount that might be used to buy undergarments or it can be used to paying the tailors. Omuseye wa maama is meant to appreciate the Mabalya (mother-in-law) for the efforts the mother she has done to nurture her daughter.

But some families can combine both erisunga and erithahya due to the available resources such as time and money.

Names and purposes of the 12 goats in omukagha (dowry/bride price)
Number	Name of the goat	For who / purpose
1	Embaya (one big male goat)	Olhughanda (clan)
2	Eya Nyamwana (female goat)	Mother of the bride/girl
3	Eya Nyinyalhume	Uncle of the girl
4	Eya Sokulhu	The grand father from the father's side
5	Eya Songali	The aunt of the girl
6	Kithanga	Discourages a wife/girl from divorcing
7	Kibogho (must be black in color)	To motivating the girl/wife
8	Iremba	Erilemba lemba (convincing) the girl during marriage
9	Kighondo	To keep softening the heart of the girl/wife in her marriage
10	Ngabo	Remind the wife to keep giving (erighaba) to her in-laws
11	Eyerisaba	To ask for the lady from her family
12	Eyeribhinga	To accompany all the other goats

==== Give away ====
Give away is a modern trend/tradition that was copied from other cultures and many Bankonzo have adopted it. And under this trend, it is when the groom comes to pick his wife on this after paying his family the omukagha and he does not attend the Eritahya. A girl's giveaway ceremony is held on a different day where the wife is officially given to her newly wed husband. The man's family brings appreciation gifts which include; dresses for nyamwana (the mother of the bride) and abasongali (aunts) for educating the bride about marriage affairs and what is expected of her, a suit for the father of bride, sugar, paraffin, match boxes, seats (sofa sets or dining chairs), bars of soap, salt, mattress, water tanks among other things. The appreciation gifts are optional. But also in case the Omukagha was not fully paid for many reasons such as the girl's family requested for many things for omukagha, the balance is cleared on the give away day. And Embene yeri saba (a female goat for requesting for the bride) is brought on this day. It is a female goat because they expect that the newly wed couple is going to give birth to children but of course the wife is might be barren or the man impotent.

The bonde aka Omukwe, Muko (bride's elder brother) is the one who holds the hand of the bride (his sister) and hands her over the aunt of the groom on the give away function. If the bride's elder brother is younger than her, a cousin brother of the bride is the one to hand over the bride.

==== Wedding ====
Going to church or the mosque was optional in the old traditions of the Bakonzo. But in modern traditions of Bakonzo, some couples go to the places of worship to exchange wedding vows and also exchange wedding rings. And it is the Mukodomi / Bonde (the elder brother's sister) that hands over the bride to the groom both at the give away ceremony and also in church or mosque.

The bonde aka (Omukwe, Muko) is the one who holds the hand of the bride (his sister) and walks her down the isle in the church until the bride sits next to the groom. The groom and the bride are not allowed to hold or shake hands. It is the priest that invites the bonde to hand over the right hand of bride to him and it is the priest that hands over the hand of the bride to the groom. From the time the priest hands over the bride to the groom, the couple has to hold hands until they move out of the church.

==== If the bride (girl) is a virgin at the time of her marriage ====
The songali (aunt of the bride) has to escort the bride (their daughter) to her new home. And on the wedding night of their virgin daughter, the aunt of the bride has to sleep in the same room with the bride and the groom to solve or guide on any issues that might arise during the couple's wedding night especially during the couple's first sexual intercourse. And it is when the husband will determine whether the bride was a virgin or not and report to the aunt who stayed in the room with them and also to his uncle.

And in the morning, the bed sheets the couple slept on during their wedding night are packed and delivered to the Songali we songa (the aunt who gave out the bride/girl) to open the packaging such as a bag. If the bride was not a virgin, the aunt who slept in the room and also the uncle of the groom and a hole is cut in the bed sheets that the newly wed couple slept on during their wedding night and those perforated bedsheets will not be delivered to the songali we songa. If the bride was a virgin, those bed sheets are not washed before they are delivered to the Songali we songa.

There would be no special celebration that the bride was a virgin but the excitement of the bride's family that their daughter is going to give birth to Kanyere (Kanyere or Nzanzwa (boy)

===== Erihimbulha Ebihango =====
After a girl is taken by her husband, the Songali Owesonga (the main aunt to receive her marriage issues) is supposed to go back to the home where the girl was married to and destroy all the structures in a ceremony called Erihimbulha Ebihango that were set up when giving away the bride as she is the only one supposed to destroy them. And if she does not visit that home, then no one else is allowed to destroy them. The purpose is to get feedback on how her daughter is doing in her new family, whether her aunt needs to educate her on some things or not before.

=== Divorce ===
If the husband and his wife can not solve the challenges that might lead to their divorce, the couple discusses their marriage challenges with the best man, the matron or any other elder the couple believes will help them sort their issues/challenges. if they fail to solve those challenges, the wife moves to her Mukodomi/bonde (her brother who handed her to her husband) to report to her about her divorce. The wife's brother later informs to the woman's parents about the divorce of their daughter.

==== The husband visiting the family of the wife who has divorced ====
If the husband still loves his wife and wants her go back to his home, the sobyalha (the father of the husband of the wife) or another representative chosen by the sobyalah has to go to meet the bonde (the wife's brother) with Embene eye likwamilha aka Embene eye Ngomolho (divorce follow up goat) who takes him (the husband of his sister) to the wife's parents to discuss about the reasons that led to the divorce of their daughter divorced and also the way forward. And if the divorced woman does not have a brother say he passed on, then the woman divorcing has to report to her mother who later reports to their daughter's father or the guardian of the family in case the woman's father passed on. The Embene eye Ngomolho is not to be reared or be taken back by the father of the husband of the bride who has divorced but it is supposed to be slaughtered and cooked by the bride's family as a sign of respect for

If the issues of the divorce are sorted, the wife can choose to go back with the husband on that same day or she might request for some time before she goes back to her husband and also confirm the real day on which she will report to her home.

==== If not agreement is reached ====
If the divorce issues are not sorted to get reconciliation between the husband and the wife such as she refuses to go back to her husband's home, the wife's family had to refund the 12 goats that paid in omukagha back to the man's family. In the process of taking back the dowry, the bonde (Wife's brother) is the one supposed to refund Edhimu and also the husband of the divorce wife takes the seat that he sat on during the divorce meeting with the wife's family. A written letter from the husband's family is given to the divorced woman's family which includes statement that indicate that they have let go of the bride and that any man who is interested in her, should go on and marry her.

But with the Bakonzo intermarriages, copying of some traditions from other cultures and also the modern societies and bodies debate about the refunding of all of the 12 goats that were taken during dowry especially if the woman had given birth before her divorce.

==== Taking back the wife back to her husband ====
The family of the bride (who has divorced) might decide to take back their daughter after she divorced whether the man has come to meet her family or not or after discussing with her and finding out the reasons for her divorce were not valid or strong reasons. The father of the bride has to take a goat to the husband's family who have to slaughtered it, cook it and eat it. And if the wife refuses to go back with the wife, the father of the girl will be given a letter by the husband's family, which includes statements that indicate that they have let go of the bride and that any man who is interested in her, should go on and marry her.

=== After birth rituals ===
When the wife is pregnant, then girl's family is supposed to be informed so that preparation begins and also praying. And when she is in labour, the family is supposed to be informed and the mother of the girl and the sister of the girl might come to help her out. After giving birth, the new mother's family is informed and they organise for an Eritwa Omulhemba ceremony within 7 days after giving birth.

The Eritwa omulhemba involved the family cooking food of her choice for the new mother and also her tying Omulhemba (thread) around her waist to prevent the belly from over stretching due to giving birth and that the food she ate should be stopped by that Omulhemba because it was believed that inside of her had developed a hole that was created by the growing baby. The ready food from the girl's family would be served to her husband and his family. And in return, the boy's family had to give back raw food (uncooked food) which could be bananas, meat and many more food types.

Before the after-birth bleeding stopped, Omubithi (the new mother) was not allowed to sleep on her matrimonial bed as she was considered to be unclean for that bed and also to let the new mother recover from the labour and pregnancy stress. So, she would sleep on mattress on the floor with her baby without the husband for a period of about 6 weeks. The day the new mother will go back to her matrimonial bed, another ceremony is held that is on the eighth day when the Eritwa Omulhemba ceremony was held and the next day, the baby would be moved out of the house to be shown to the parents of the husband who give her gifts which include money of any amount and other items for both the new father and also the new mother. And the day when the newly born met husband's parents, that is when the it would be given a name that the elders had desired to give it. And the Omubithi had to go back to their home to celebrate with her family and she is required to be given a goat and cassava flour to take to her home. And she is given people to help her to carry the items accompanying her to her home. On reaching her parents home, money had to first be put on the Omubithi's parents before they hold the child and they give blessings to the newly born baby. And also they accept the baby. And the new parents go back to their home. And that serves as a confirmation to the public that the couple is going to resume their conjugal rights that very day.

==== Giving birth to twins ====
If a woman gave birth to abahasa(twins) and she would be given a title of Nyabahasa. The mother of twins had to go back to her parents home for a ceremony called "Erithahya Olhuhasa" because woman was the one who brought twins in her home and gifts that had to be in pairs were taken on that day in order to accept the newly born to into their family, add them on the numbers of the other twins that are in that family and also the parents of the Nyabahasa to hold on the twins. Traditionary, Eshangobi (skins of animals) would be taken for the parents to sit on when carrying those twins. Nyabahasa's family and relatives sang for the twins their 7 traditional songs and anyone who decided to sing had to sing all the songs. And also the next day the parents of the twins go back to their home with a goat and again celebrate the twins.

There would be another ceremony/meeting for naming of the twins. And the man was required to fund all these functions. If the twins cried a lot or refused to breast feed, then the spouse (Isebahasa) is believed to have committed adultery and has to explain himself to the Nyabahasa where and when. And after the Isebahasa apologizing to the Nyabahasa, she would request the twins to forgive their dad and they stop crying.

The Nyabahasa had to sleep with one of her husband's nephews when she announced that she was ready to go back to her husband's bed at a ceremony that was known as Olhuhasa. The Olhuhasa ceremony had to be announced by the husband (Isebahasa) of the Nyabahasa in his social circles and friends from the time the Nyabahasa heals or stops bleeding to the time the Olhuhasa takes place in a hut that was built in the compound of Isebahasa. It was believed that the abahasa would die if the Olhuhasa ceremony was not performed. The oldest nephew was always chosen and if the oldest nephew failed to perform the sexual intercourse with the Nyabahasa another nephew would be chosen.

Before cooking food for the other family members or at ceremony in a family which has twins, food for the twins has to be cooked first otherwise that food would not get ready not matter how it was prepared and using whatever means of cooking. Even during planting seasons, families with twins had to first plant the food for the twins so that the other crops would grow well and get a good yield.

The parents had to buy similar things for the twins while growing up. if they did do it, then one of the twins would fall sick or even Akawulhuka (passes on).

All the rituals and ceremonies had to be performed for the twins otherwise there would be consequences in the future on the children. In this modern society, most parents take their twins to places of worship to pray for their newly born twins.

==== When a wife does not give birth ====
If the wife did not give birth, then she became a social misfit and she was the one to blame for not producing not the husband. And it was that the wife committed some abominations that were now hunting her.

=== Funeral rituals ===
==== When a woman died ====
She was supposed to be buried where she had been married because that family paid Omukagha and also she was hugged for the last time by her father (or head of the family who handed her to the man's family). If the dowry was not yet paid then she has to be taken back to her home for burial. But if she died when she has given birth and the Omukagha (dowry) was not taken to her home or the man's family had failed to pay the Omukagha for her, then the husband's family has to pay the Omukagha so that the husband gets the authority to be buried to his home or his ancestral grounds.

The next day a meeting was held on who was supposed to handle her body (that is washing and dressing her body, putting her body in the coffin and also closing coffin in which her body was placed in), And if she was a young person her body was handled by her Nyakolhome and if she was an adult person, her body was handled by Omuhwa wiwe and then she was buried.

The next day, another meeting was held between the deceased's family (in this case which is the husband's family) and the girl's family and also the relatives from both family. To request the late wife's family to look for their son another wife/woman to look after the children his late wife has left behind. The late wife was not among the people to receive any of the inheritance. But according to the Ugandan Succession Act of 2022, a woman has a right to make her own things and also choose who is going to be the beneficially of her inheritance.

==== When a husband died ====
When a man died, Omukwakali (the wife to the deceased) ties Mbutha (a piece of cloth on her head), people also remove their shoes and walk using bare feet to show their sorrow, respect and love they had for the deceased. The Omukwakali was required not to bath for 7 days and Eshangubi (the orphans) are required not to bathe for 3 days. The reason for not bathing and stepping down was that, (Olhuholo) death would be afraid of them because they were dirty. And after the third days, the orphans were taken to the river in the wee hours and they be go back to the home and sit on a mat from which their hair is shaved using a Razor blade leaving on hair on the head. To show their attachment to the deceased.

The wife of the deceased would also be required to go and put/fix the under garments such as knickers in a banana plant and speak words or phrases that informed her late husbands that if he wanted to meet her again then he should meet in that particular banana plant where she placed her undergarments. But those traditions are no longer practised by most Bakonzo. It was believed that if the late husband re-appeared to her wife, it was a sign of bad omen.

The next day a meeting was held on who was supposed to handle his body (that was washing and dressing his body, putting his body in the coffin and also closing coffin in which his body was put), And if he was a young person his body is handled by his Nyakolhome and if he was an adult person, his body is handled by Omuhwa wiwe and then he is buried.

A clan meeting was held to determine the distribution of the deceased's property, the heir of that family, the care taker of the deceased's family (who is usually his brother) and also he was required to continue producing children. But in the modern traditions, the wives of the late husbands are allowed to go get married somewhere else to another man or stay to keep the children close to the deceased's family.

=== Clan cleansing ritual ===
This was a ritual done after every 3 to 5 years and it was headed by the clan head/leader. The clan head who was always required to have two sheep or two goats set aside for the cleansing ceremony, invited the other clan members to a joint worship fellowship and requested all of them to carry sacrifices depending on their capabilities. The sacrifices included animals such as goats, sheep, and hens.

On a chosen day, all the clan members come together and repented their sins and also sacrificed their animals they carried. The blood from all the animals of other clan members was collected and then mixed with the blood from one of the two animals that were prepared by the clan head. All the clan members had to step into the combined blood for cleansing and also atonement.

The second animal that was prepared by the clan head would not be sacrificed but was taken deep in the mountains to die by itself or be killed by other animals. It was meant to carry away all the sins and misfortunes of the clan.

The ritual always ended with eating food and also sweeping the compound where the ritual happened and all the roads and pathways of the village. The sweeping symbolised that the sin, evil and all misfortunes of the villages have been swept away.

== Bakonzo gods and religious beliefs ==
The Bakonzo have many gods and spirits. They always prayed to them through shrines and offered them sacrifices. These gods include;

- Nyamuhunga is the creator god who is the king of heaven and earth.
- Nzururu was created by Nyamuhunga and is believed to be the father of Kithasamba and Nyabibuya.
- Kalisa is a half bodied monster (that is one eye, one ear, one arm, half nose) who had powers to heal, haunt, kill, give fertility or cause bareness.
- Nyabarika is the god for life and death.
- Kithasamba (also misspelled Kitasamba) as is the overall god for Bakonzo human life and natural environment and he lives in the Rwenzori mountain. The snow is believed to be Kithasamba's sperm
- Nyabibuya is the god of fertility.
- Kalisya is the god of hunting and Wildlife.
- Ndyoka is the god of water (lakes, rivers, hot springs).
- Musangania is the god of reconciliation and peace.

== Bakonzo music and their dance types ==
The Bakonzo people cultural dance

- Endara
- Omukumu
- Kikibi
- Amasinduko
- Omukobo
- Eluma

== Purported Abasinga (kings) ba Bakonzo ==
1. 1963–1966: Isaya Mukirania (Kibanzanga I)
2. 2009–present: Charles Mumbere (Irema-Ngoma I)

== See also ==
1. Rwenzururu
2. Buganda Kingdom
3. Baganda
