= Konjo language (Bantu) =

Bantu language spoken in Central Africa

Konjo
- Olhukonzo
- Native to: Uganda and Democratic Republic of the Congo
- Ethnicity: Bakonjo
- Native speakers: 610,000 in Uganda (2002 census)
- Language family: Niger–Congo?: Atlantic–Congo; Volta-Congo; Benue–Congo; Bantoid; Southern Bantoid; Bantu; Northeast Bantu; Great Lakes Bantu; Rwenzori; Konjo

Language codes
- ISO 639-3: koo
- Glottolog: konz1239
- Guthrie code: JD.41

The lhukonzo (Konzo) language, variously rendered Lukonzo, Olukonzo, and konzo, is a Bantu language spoken by the Konzo people of Uganda and the Democratic Republic of the Congo. It has a 77% lexical similarity with Nande. There are many dialects, including Sanza (Ekisanza).

== Writing system ==
Konzo alphabet
a	b	d	e	f	g	h	i	k	l	m	n	o	p	q	r	s	t	u	v	w	y	z

== Phonetics ==
=== Consonants ===
Konzo consonant phonemes
		Labial	Dental	Alveolar	Retroflex	Postalveolar/ Palatal	Velar	Glottal
Nasal		m		n		ɲ ⟨ny⟩		
Stop	prenasalized	ᵐb ⟨mb⟩		ⁿd ⟨nd⟩		ᶮɟ ⟨ngy⟩	ᵑɡ ⟨ng⟩	
Stop	implosive/ voiced	ɓ ⟨bb⟩		d		ɟ ⟨gy⟩	g	
Stop	voiceless	p		t	ʈ ⟨th⟩	c ⟨ky⟩	k	
Stop	voiceless prenasalized		ⁿt ⟨nt⟩					
Affricate				t͡s ⟨ts⟩				
Fricative	prenasalized			ⁿz ⟨nz⟩				
Fricative	voiced	v	β ⟨b⟩	z			ɣ ⟨gh⟩	
Fricative	voiceless	f		s				h ⟨h⟩
Approximant				l	ɭ ⟨lh⟩	j ⟨y⟩	w	
Rhotic				r				

=== Vowels ===
Konzo is characterized by distinguishing advanced and retracted tongue root.

==== Konzo's IPA vowel chart ====
	Front	Back
Close	i	u
Near-close	ɪ	ʊ
Mid	ɛ	ɤ o
Open	a	

== Basic vocabulary ==
List of basic phrases and words.

- Good morning – wabukire
- Good afternoon – wasibire
- Good night - ukeyesaye buholho
- Thank you (very much) – wasingya (kutsibu)
- How are you? – ghune wuthi?
- How are you? – muneyo?
- Fine – ngane ndeke
- Sir/man – mulhume
- Madam/woman – mukalhi
- Boy – omuthabana
- Girl – omumbesa
- Dear – mwanithu
- Friend – omukaghu
- King – mukama/mwami omusinga
- 2-10 – ibiri, isatu, ini, ithanu, mukagha, musanju, munani, mwenda, ikumi
- Car – engumbaghalhi
- Water – amaghetse
- Gift – kihembo
- House - enumba
- Goat - embene
- Dog - embwa

== Grammar ==
=== Verbs ===
The infinitive is indicated by the prefix eri- (before a consonant) or ery- (before a vowel). For example: ery'asa ("to come").
