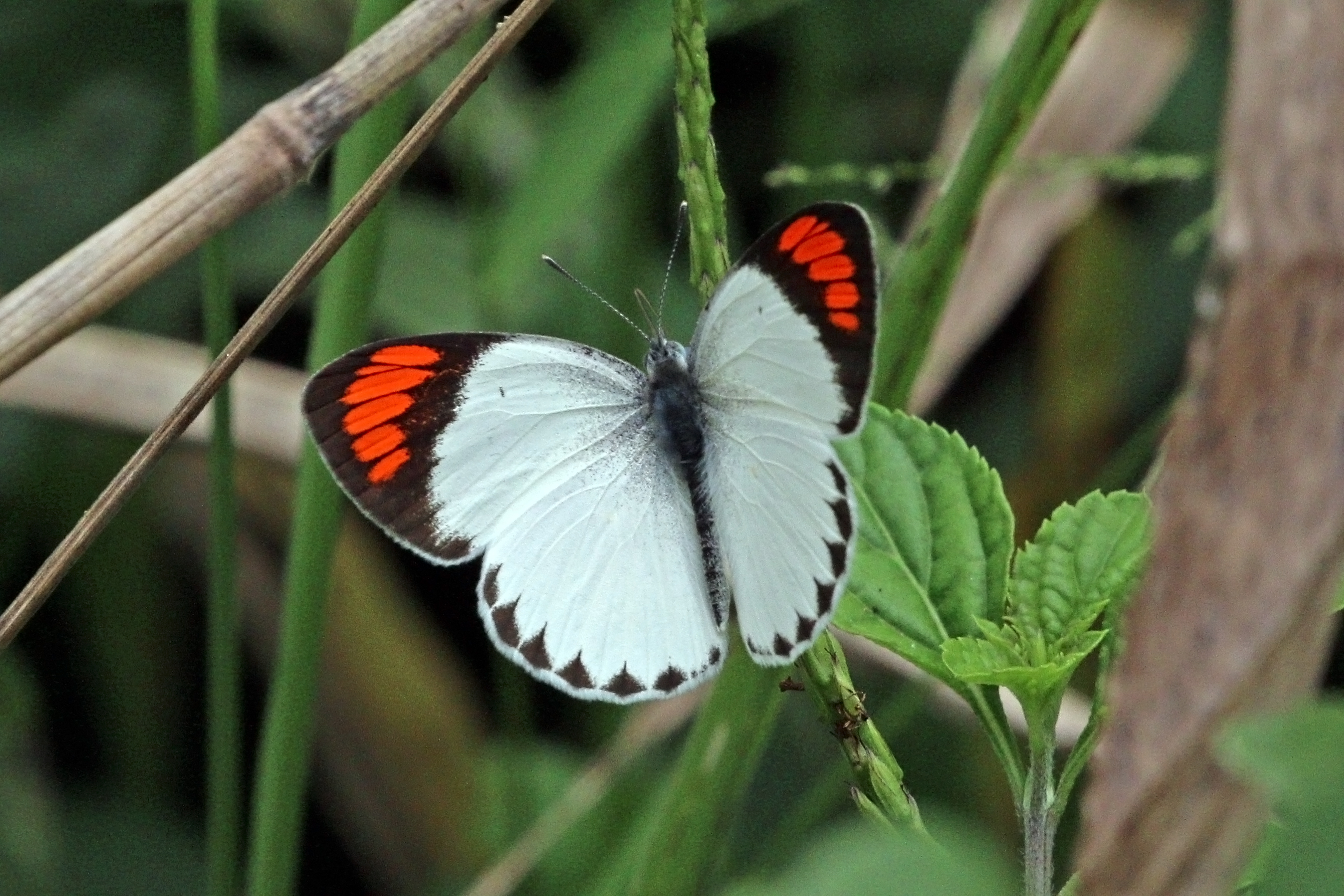
- C. e. euippe male Bobiri Forest, Ghana
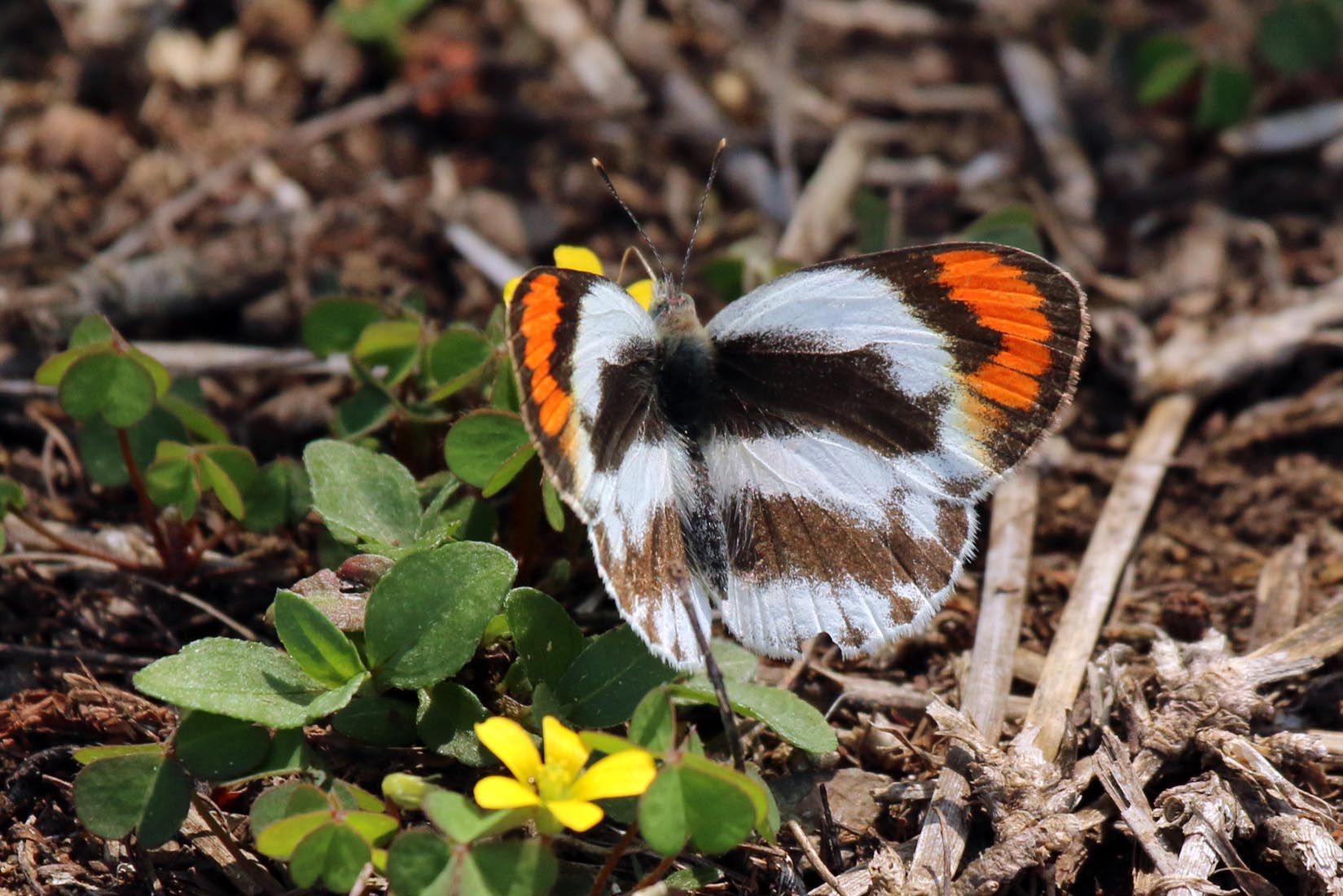
- Female, uMkhuze Game Reserve, KwaZulu-Natal, South Africa

Conservation status
- Least Concern (IUCN 3.1)

Scientific classification
- Kingdom: Animalia
- Phylum: Arthropoda
- Clade: Pancrustacea
- Class: Insecta
- Order: Lepidoptera
- Family: Pieridae
- Genus: Colotis
- Species: C. euippe

Binomial name
- Colotis euippe (Linnaeus, 1758)

Synonyms
- Papilio euippe Linnaeus, 1758; Papilio arethusa Drury, 1773; Papilio hanna Herbst, 1792; Pieris amytis Godart, 1819; Anthocharis cebrene Boisduval, 1836; Anthocharis ocale Boisduval, 1836; Anthocharis eurygone Lucas, 1852; Anthopsyche epigone Felder and Felder, 1865; Teracolus pseudocale Butler, 1876; Teracolus angolensis Butler, 1876; Teracolus microcale Butler, 1876; Teracolus suffusus Butler, 1876; Teracolus loandicus Butler, 1872; Teracolus evippe ab. pulveratula Strand, 1913; Teracolus evippe ab. mokundangensis Strand, 1913; Colotis evippe evippe f. leucoma Talbot, 1939; Teracolus complexivus Butler, 1886; Teracolus pyrrhopterus Butler, 1894; Colotis evippe f. mugenya Stoneham, 1940; Colotis evippe f. lydia Stoneham, 1957; Colotis evippe f. deineira Stoneham, 1957; Colotis evippe f. evander Stoneham, 1957; Anthocharis exole Reiche, 1850; Anthopsyche roxane Felder and Felder, 1865; Colotis evippe f. ochroleucus Talbot, 1939; Colotis paradoxa Dufrane, 1947; Pieris omphale Godart, 1819; Anthocharis theogone Boisduval, 1836; Anthopsyche procne Wallengren, 1857; Anthopsyche acte Felder and Felder, 1865; Teracolus omphaloides Butler, 1876; Teracolus hybridus Butler, 1876; Colotis evippe omphale f. ochreata Talbot, 1939; Colotis euippe f. arcuata van Son, 1949; Colotis euippe f. namaqua van Son, 1949

= Colotis euippe =

Species of butterfly

Colotis euippe is a butterfly of the family Pieridae that is found in the Afrotropical realm.

== Description ==
The wingspan is 35–45 mm. The adults fly year-round.

Adults in Witsand offer reduced black markings in their summer forms, differing from specimens from other regions.

== Habitat and behavior ==
The larvae feed on Maerua, Capparis, Cadaba, and Boscia species.

== Subspecies ==
The following subspecies are recognised:

- C. e. euippe (Linnaeus, 1758) – round-winged orange tip (southern Senegal, Gambia, Guinea-Bissau, Guinea, Sierra Leone, Liberia, Ivory Coast, Ghana, Burkina Faso, Togo, Benin, Nigeria, Cameroon, Chad, Central African Republic, Democratic Republic of the Congo, northern Angola)
- C. e. mediata Talbot, 1939 (Democratic Republic of the Congo, Zambia, northern and western Zimbabwe)
- C. e. omphale (Godart, 1819) – smoky orange tip (Democratic Republic of the Congo, Kenya, Tanzania, Malawi, Mozambique, Zimbabwe, Botswana, Namibia, South Africa, Eswatini, Lesotho, Comoros)
- C. e. complexivus (Butler, 1886) (Uganda, Kenya, Tanzania, southern Somalia)
- C. e. exole (Reiche, 1850) (southern Sudan, southern Ethiopia, Somalia, south-western Saudi Arabia, Yemen)
- C. e. mirei Bernardi, 1960 (Tibesti Mountains in Chad)

Torben Larsen developed a species numbering system for his 2005 publication Butterflies of West Africa. The nominate subspecies is #63. The 'Larsen' numbers have since been used with permission in A Sharp Eye on Butterflies of Ghana.

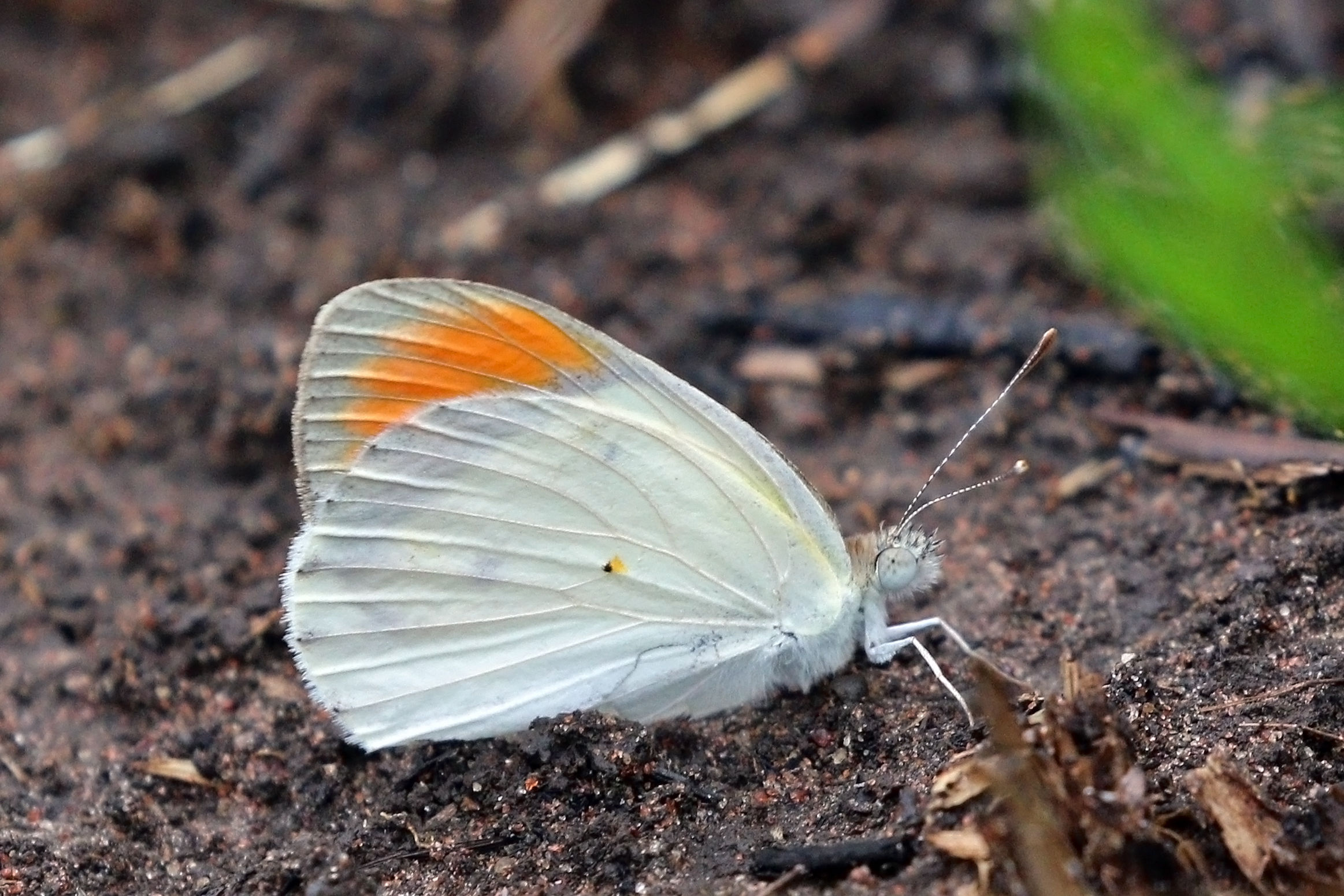
C. e. euippe, male
Shai Hills Resource Reserve, Ghana

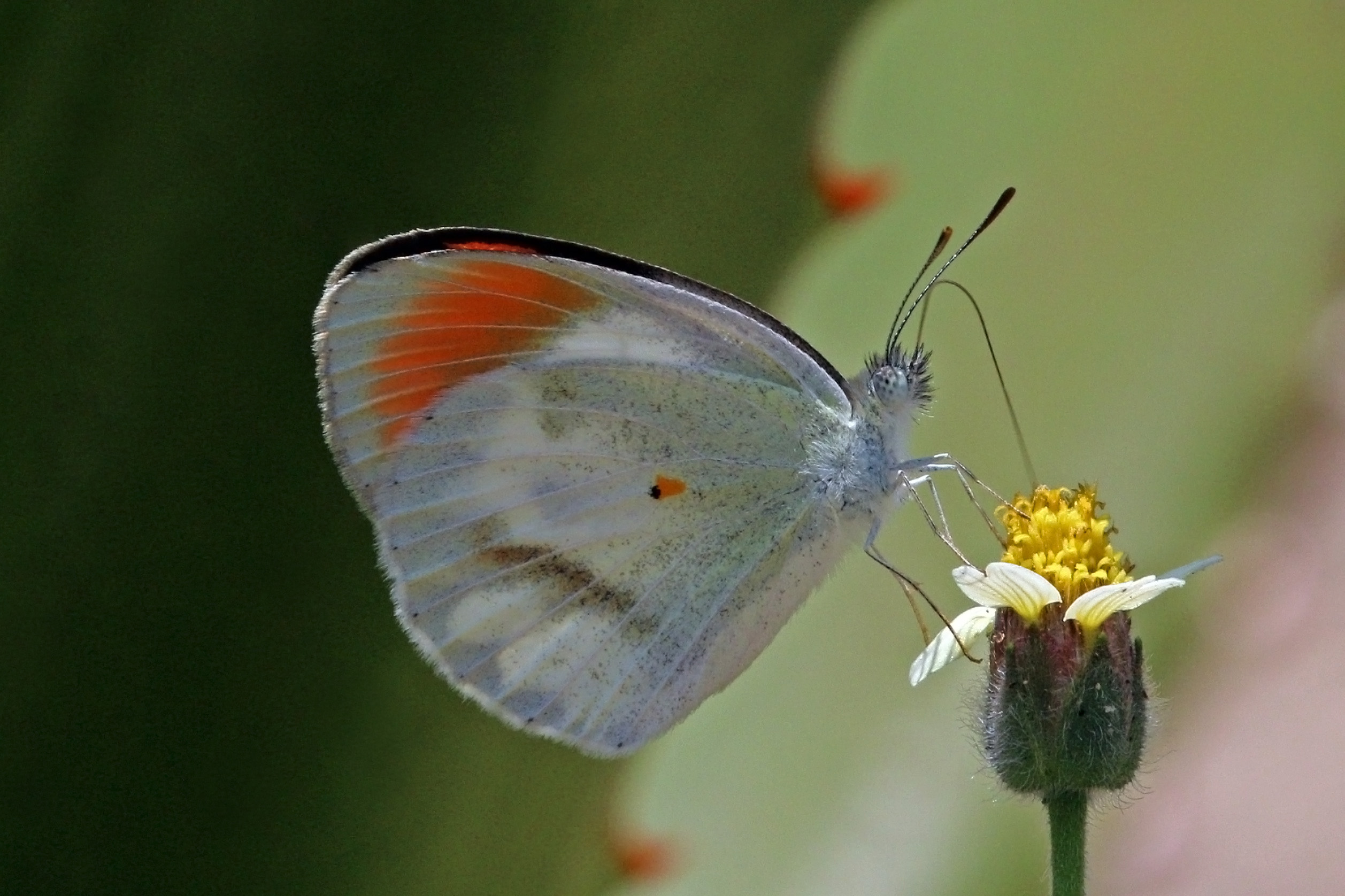
C. e. complexivus, male
Semliki Wildlife Reserve, Uganda

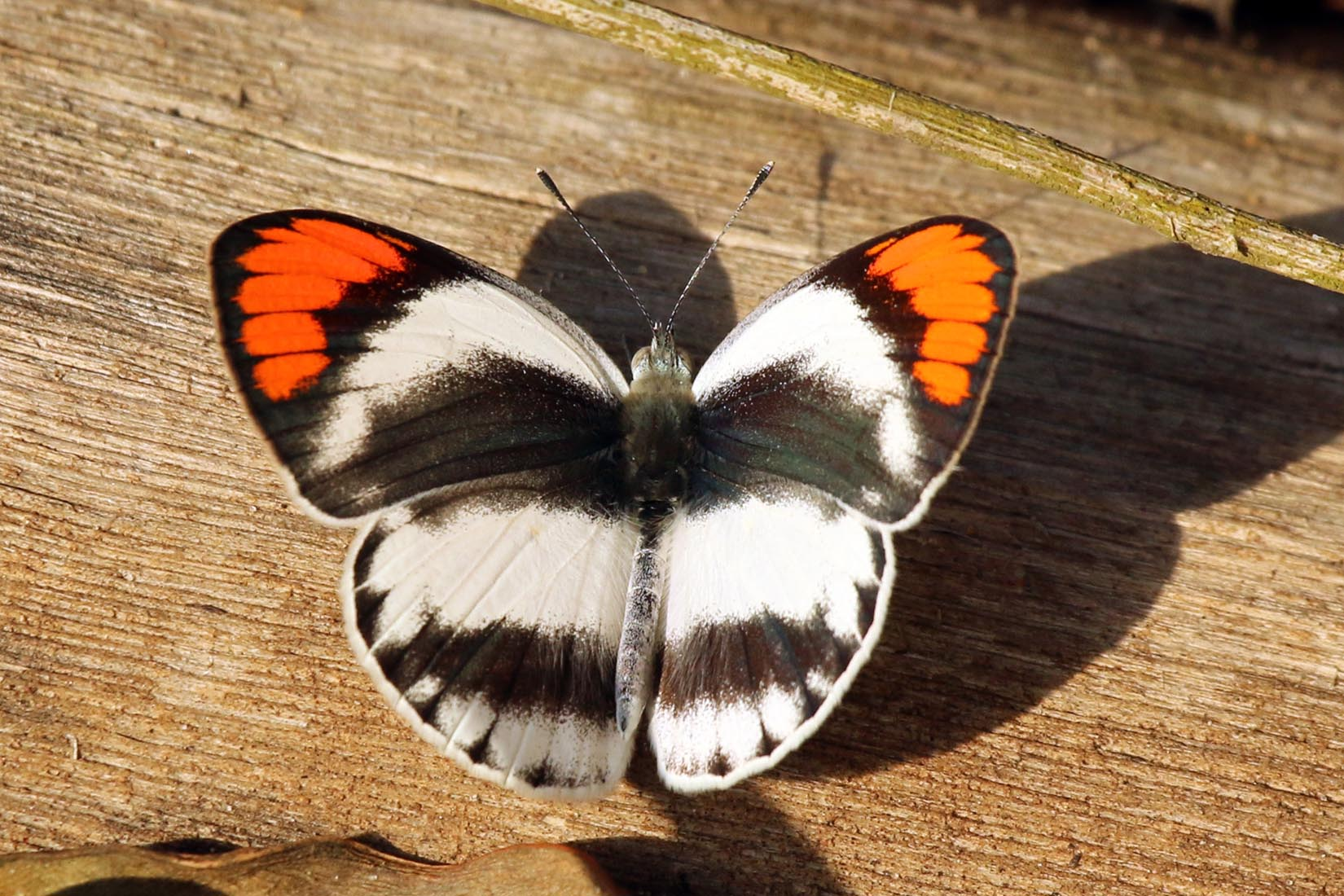
C. e. omphale male, iSimangaliso Wetland Park, KwaZulu-Natal, South Africa

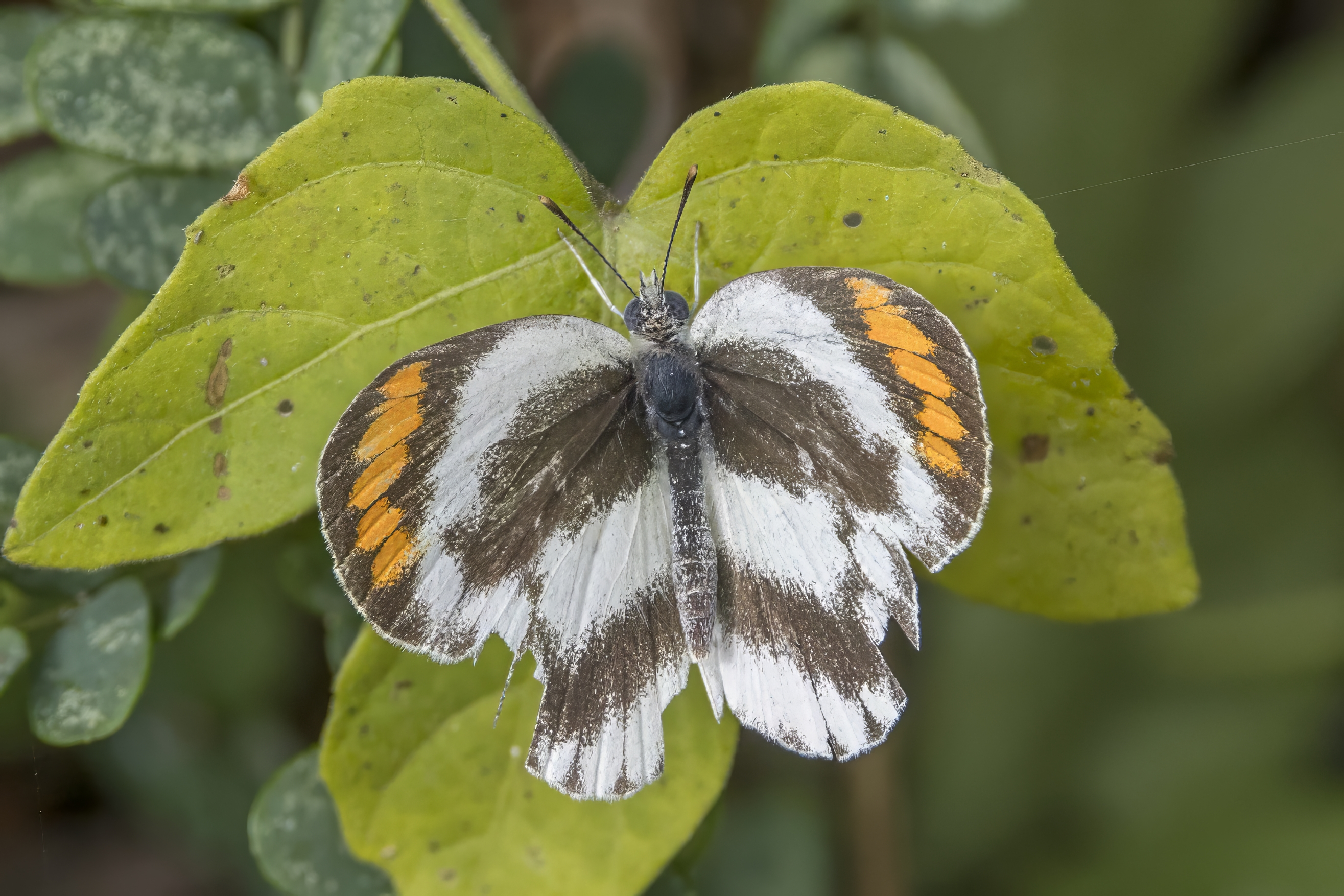
C. e. omphale female, Maputo National Park, Mozambique

== Life cycle gallery ==
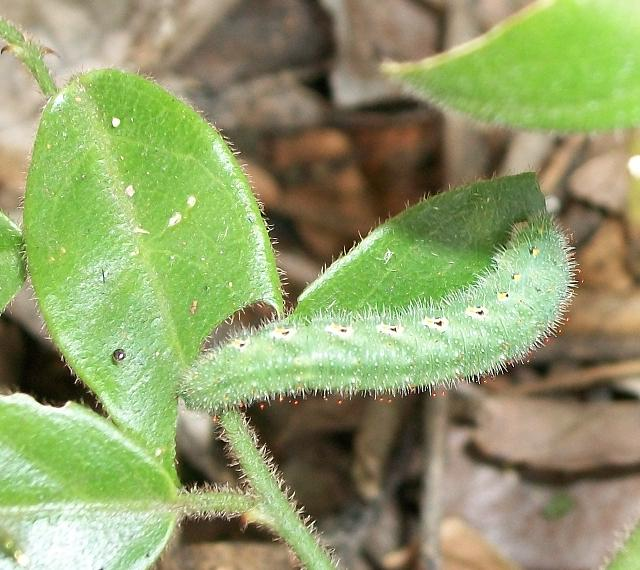
Larva on Capparis sepiaria

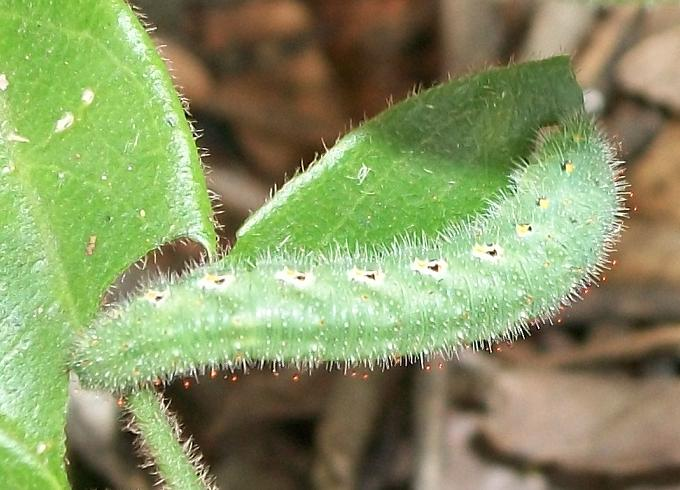
Larva

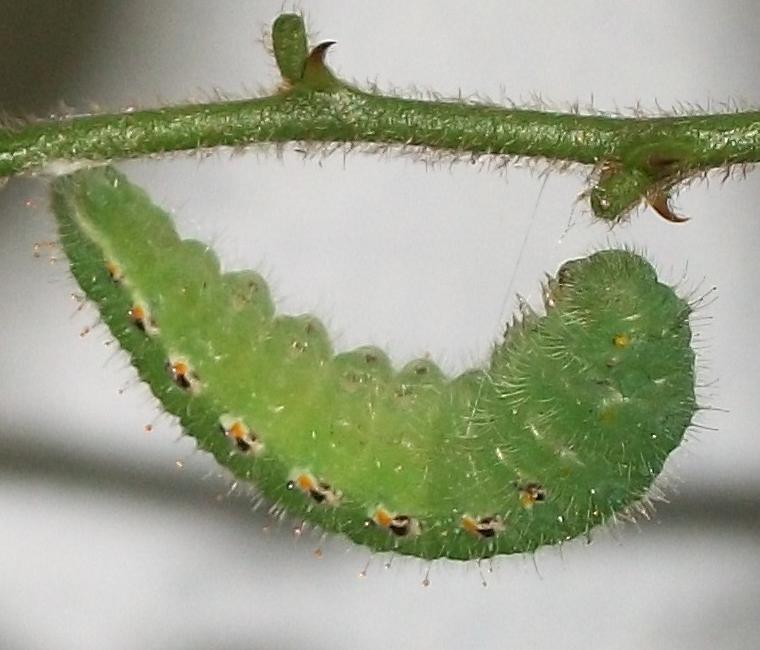
Larva pupating

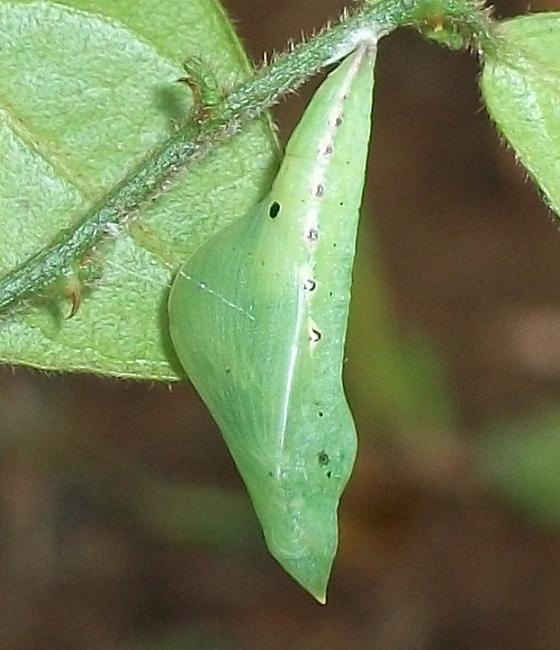
Pupa

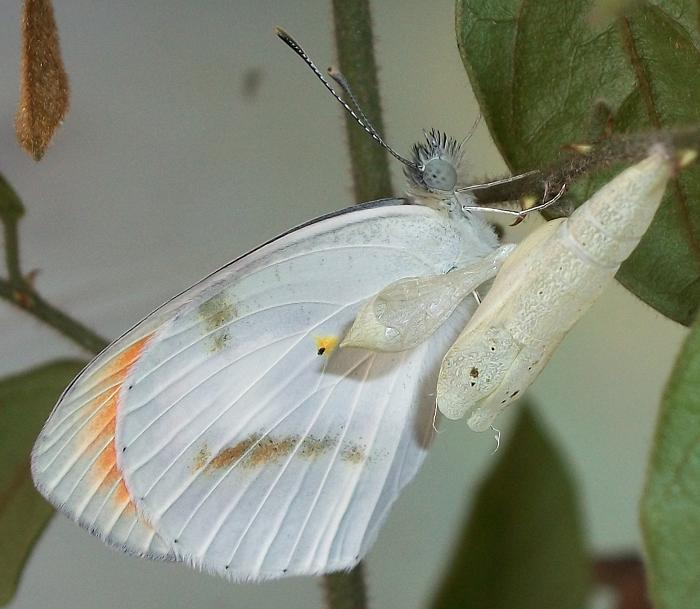
Recently hatched from pupa

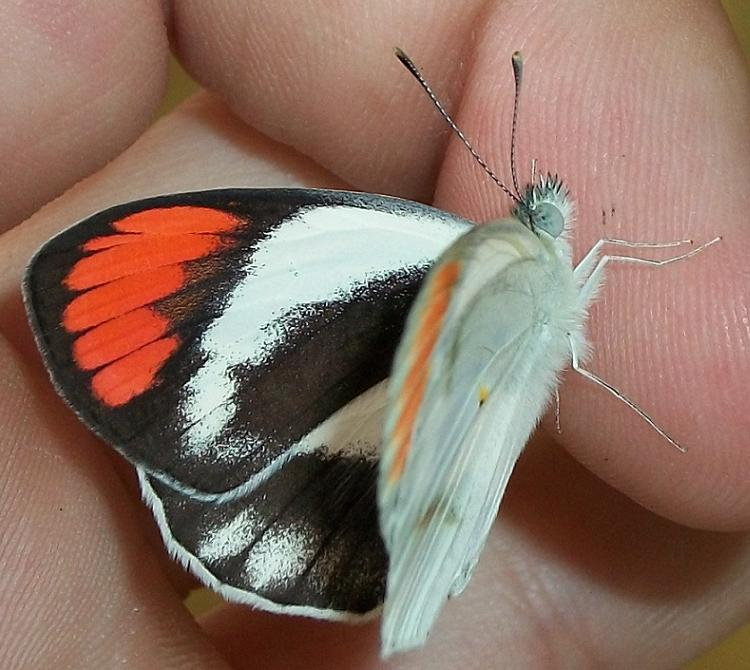
Opening wings

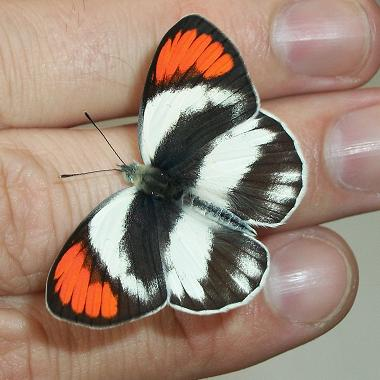
Wings open

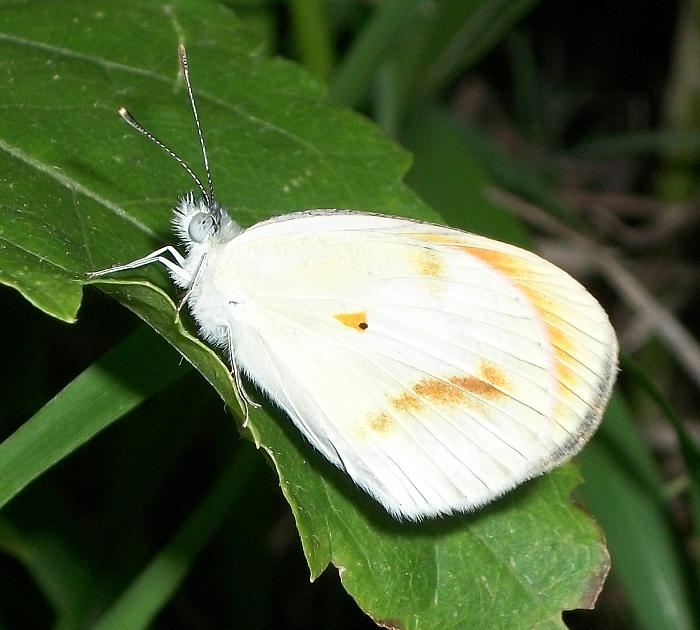
Underside
