= Tumwine =

Tumwine is a surname. Notable people with the surname include:

- Anne Mary Kobugabe Tumwine (born 1973), Ugandan teacher and politician
- Elly Tumwine (1954–2022), Ugandan professional artist, educator, and military officer
- Wilson Tumwine, Ugandan politician and businessman
