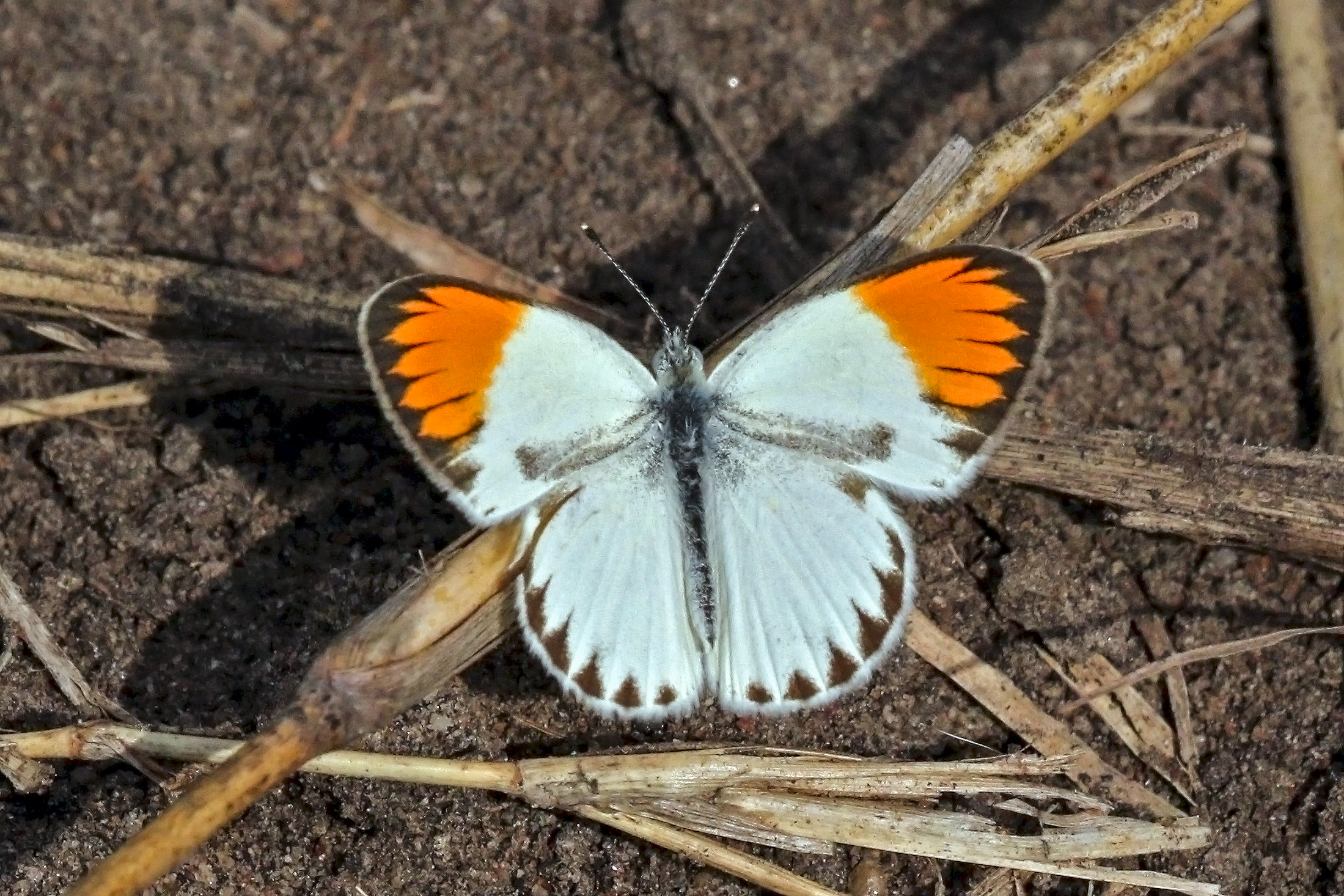
- C. e. antigone Semliki Wildlife Reserve, Uganda
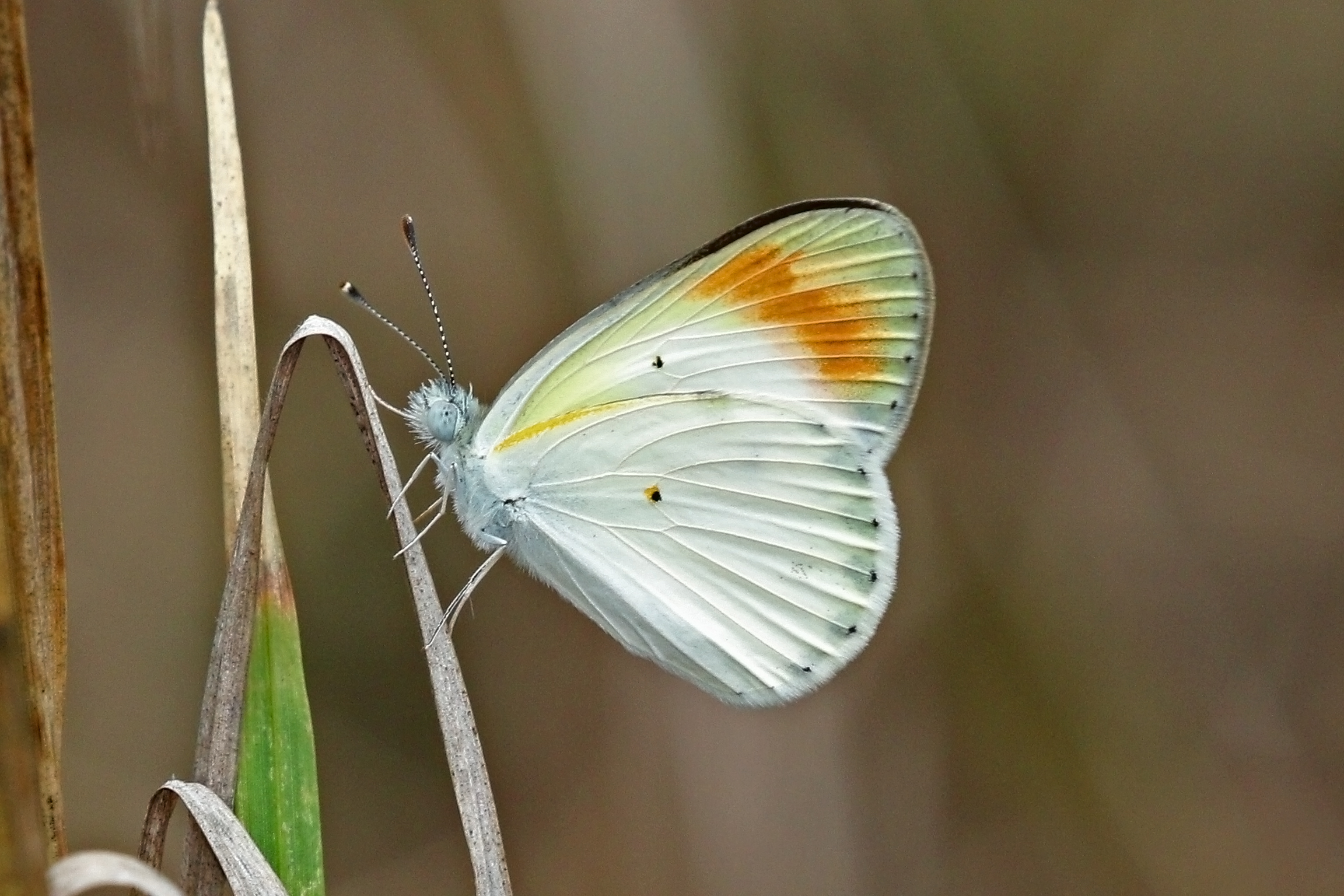
- male C. e. antigone, Ghana

Conservation status
- Least Concern (IUCN 3.1)

Scientific classification
- Kingdom: Animalia
- Phylum: Arthropoda
- Clade: Pancrustacea
- Class: Insecta
- Order: Lepidoptera
- Family: Pieridae
- Genus: Colotis
- Species: C. evagore

Binomial name
- Colotis evagore (Klug, 1829)

Synonyms
- Pontia evagore Klug, 1829; Teracolus saxeus Swinhoe, 1884; Anthocharis antigone Boisduval, 1836; Anthocharis phlegetonia Boisduval, 1836; Anthocharis delphine Boisduval, 1836; Anthocharis eione Boisduval, 1836; Anthocharis isaura Lucas, 1852; Anthocharis heuglini Felder and Felder, 1859; Anthopsyche demagore Felder and Felder, 1865; Teracolus interruptus Butler, 1872; Teracolus flaminia Butler, 1876; Teracolus lycoris Butler, 1876; Teracolus lyaeus Butler, 1876; Teracolus friga Butler, 1876; Teracolus galathinus Butler, 1876; Teracolus glycera Butler, 1876; Teracolus lucullus Butler, 1876; Teracolus gelasinus Butler, 1876; Callosune pseudetrida Westwood, 1881; Callosune ramaquabana Westwood, 1881; Teracolus coniger Butler, 1882; Teracolus minans Butler, 1882; Teracolus xanthus Swinhoe, 1884; Teracolus jamesi Butler, 1886; Teracolus comptus Butler, 1888; Teracolus bifasciatus Sharpe, 1890; Teracolus emini Butler, 1891; Teracolus metagone Holland, 1896; Colotis antigone antigone f. contrasta Talbot, 1939; Colotis antigone antigone f. decolor Talbot, 1939; Colotis antigone antigone f. luvua Talbot, 1939; Colotis antigone antigone f. bianca Talbot, 1939; Colotis antigone antigone f. wa Talbot, 1939; Colotis antigone antigone f. xanthotes Talbot, 1939; Colotis evagore antigone f. nuba Talbot, 1942; Colotis evagore antigone f. muansa Talbot, 1942; Colotis evagore antigone f. mashona Talbot, 1942; Colotis evagore antigone f. cataracta Talbot, 1942; Colotis evagore antigone f. arenosa Talbot, 1942; Colotis evagore f. polynices Stoneham, 1957; Teracolus niveus Butler, 1881; Teracolus candidus Butler, 1881; Anthocharis nouna Lucas, 1849

= Colotis evagore =

Species of butterfly

Colotis evagore, the desert orange tip, small orange tip, or tiny orange tip, is a butterfly of the family Pieridae. It is found in the dry parts of tropical Africa, northern Africa, southern Spain and southwest Arabia.

The wingspan is 28–35 mm in males and 28–38 mm in females. The adults fly from February to August depending on the range.

The larvae feed on Maerua, Capparis and Cadaba species.

== Subspecies ==
The following subspecies are recognized:

- Colotis evagore evagore Klug, 1829 – small orange tip (Saudi Arabia, Yemen)
- Colotis evagore nouna Lucas, 1849 (Spain, north-west Africa)
- Colotis evagore antigone Boisduval, 1836 (Sub-Saharan Africa, including Senegal, Gambia, Guinea, Mali, Burkina Faso, Ghana, Togo, Benin, Nigeria, Niger, Kenya, Zambia, Namibia, Botswana, Zimbabwe, Mozambique, South Africa, Eswatini)
- Colotis evagore niveus Butler, 1881 (Socotra)

Torben Larsen developed a species numbering system for his 2005 publication Butterflies of West Africa. The subspecies antigone is #65. The 'Larsen' numbers have since been used with permission in A Sharp Eye on Butterflies of Ghana.
