= Kamurasi-Baker Monument =

- Location: Masindi, Uganda
- Type: Monument
- Dedicated to: Sir Samuel Baker

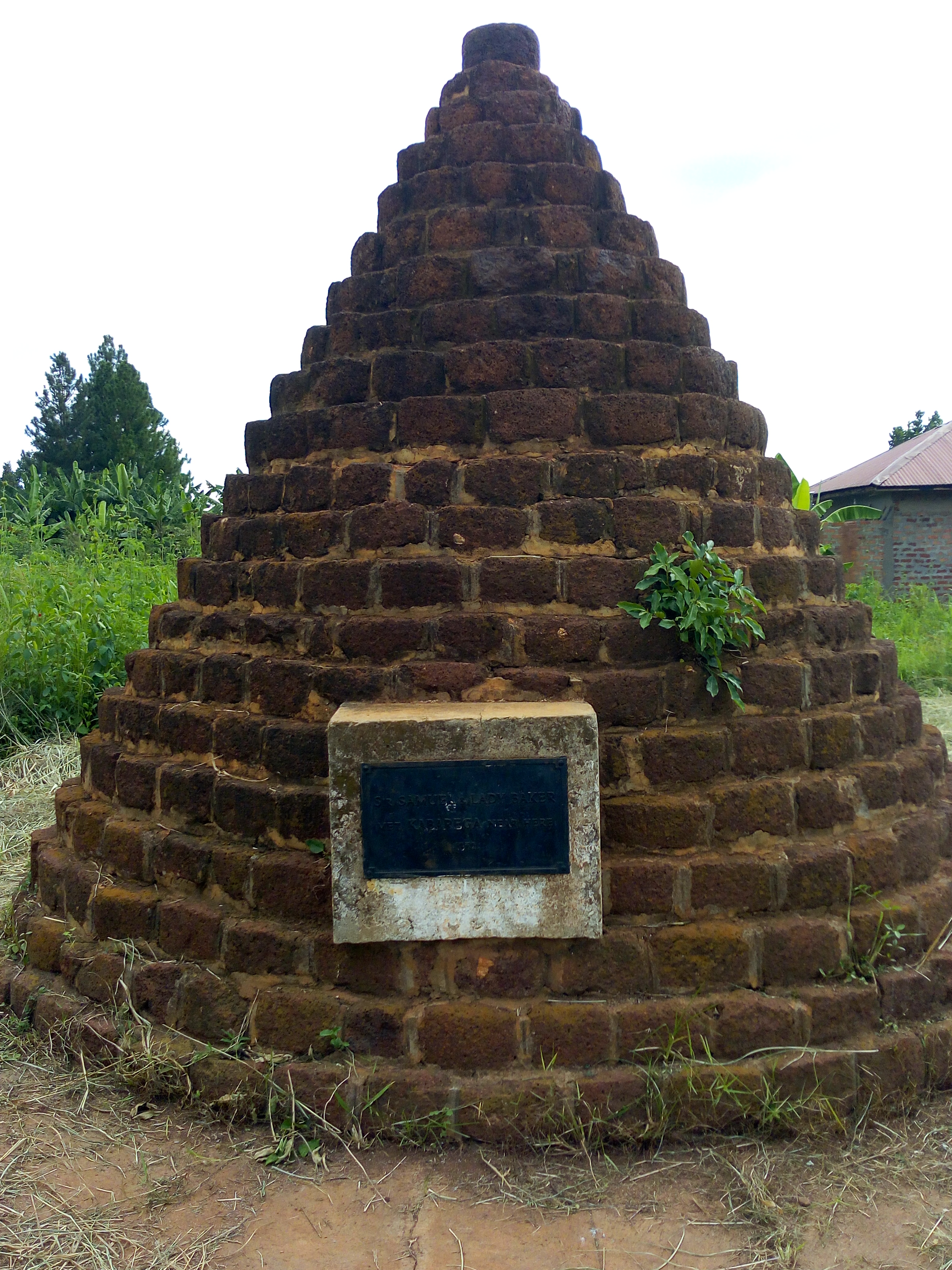
Building at Masindi port

The Kamurasi-Baker Monument is located in Masindi, Uganda.

It was completed in 1872. The stone structure around the Kamurasi Masindi symbolizes Sir Samuel Baker's exceptional effort against ending slavery in this area.

== Location ==
The monument is located In Masindi, Kijura area near Kijura Infant Nursery School, (Latitude:1.698386, Longitude: 31.707526)

== See also ==
- Masindi District
- List of monuments and memorials in Uganda
- Samuel Baker
- History of slavery in Uganda
