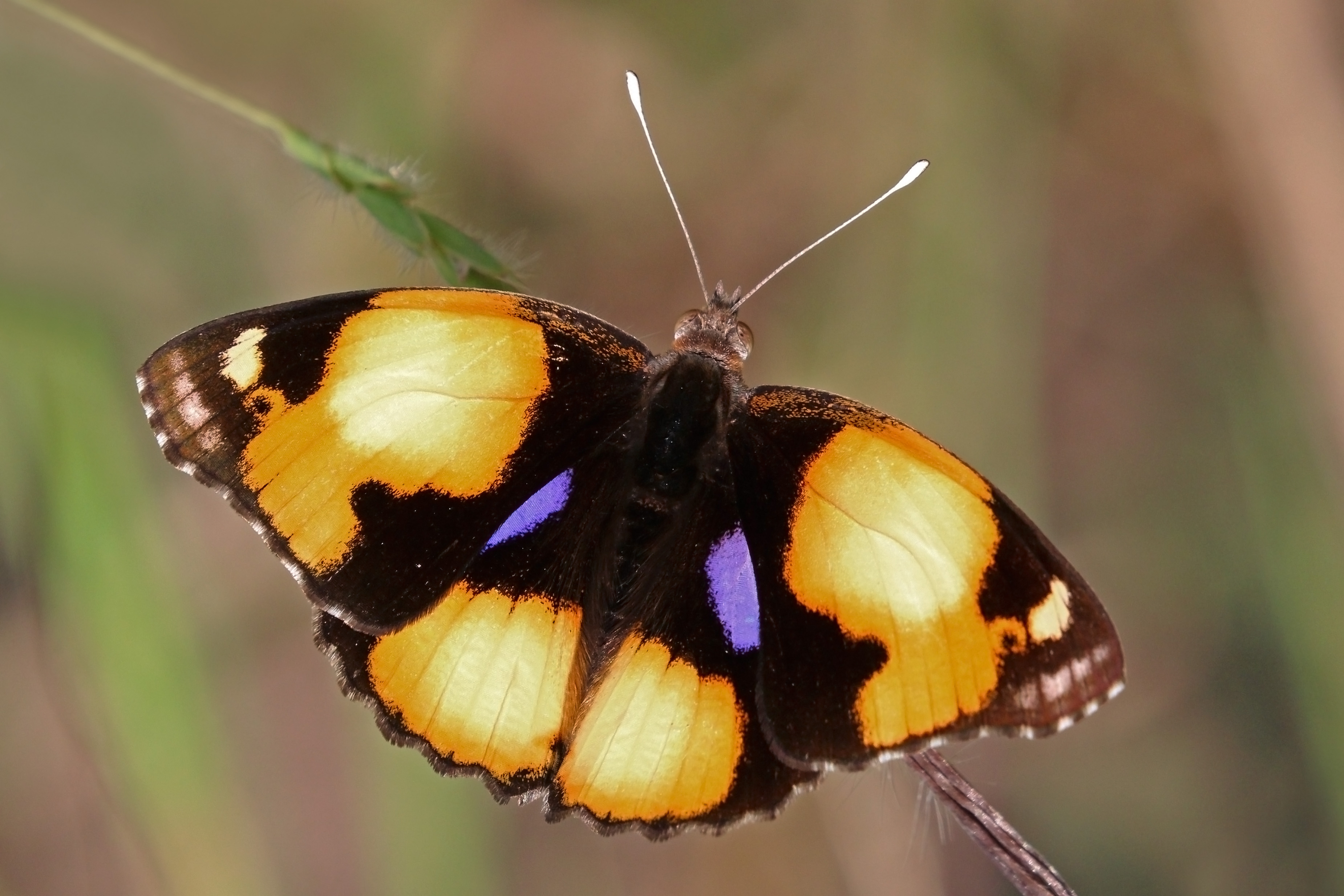
- Male, Semliki Wildlife Reserve, Uganda
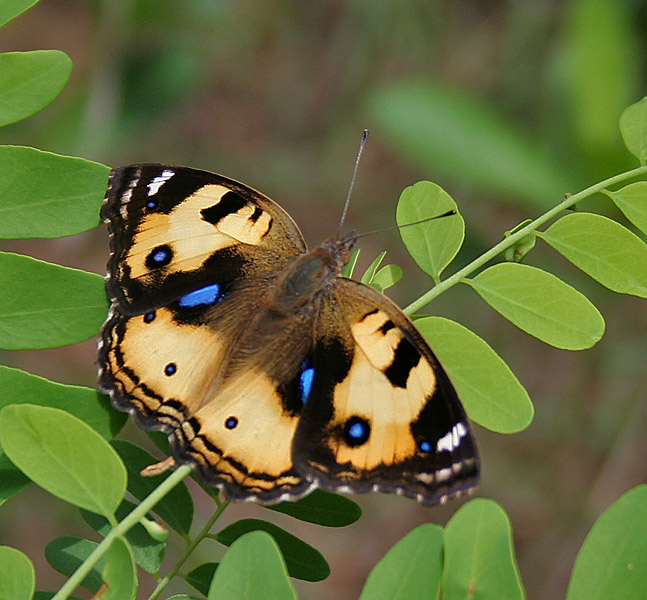
- Female, Andhra Pradesh, India

Scientific classification
- Kingdom: Animalia
- Phylum: Arthropoda
- Clade: Pancrustacea
- Class: Insecta
- Order: Lepidoptera
- Family: Nymphalidae
- Genus: Junonia
- Species: J. hierta

Binomial name
- Junonia hierta (Fabricius, 1798)

Synonyms
- Precis hierta; Papilio hierta Fabricius, 1798; Papilio lintingensis Osbeck, 1765; Junonia cebrene Trimen, 1870; Precis oenone var. cebrene ab. demaculata Neustetter, 1916; Precis oenone var. sudanica Schultze, 1920; Junonia oenone f. aeolus Stoneham, 1965; Junonia oenone f. conjuncta Stoneham, 1965; Junonia paris Trimen & Bowker, 1887

= Junonia hierta =

Yellow pansy

Species of butterfly

Junonia hierta, the yellow pansy, is a species of nymphalid butterfly found in the Palaeotropics. It is usually seen in open scrub and grassland habitats.

== Description ==
The male upper side is bright yellow. The costa of the forewing has a broad triangular jet-black projection downwards at the discocellulars, and the dorsum has a triangular projection upwards near the tornus; this black margin narrows near the middle of the termen and bears on the apex two short transverse preapical white streaks crossed by the black veins. Below these is an obscure ocellus that is sometimes absent. The anterior half and the terminal margin of the hindwing is black, and the dorsum is broadly shaded with brown while the anterior black area has a large brilliant blue spot. The cilia of both forewings and hindwings are white alternated with brown.

The underside of the forewing is pale yellow. The cell is crossed by three laterally black-margined orange-yellow bars, beyond that is a short, broad, irregular jet-black oblique band from costa to base of vein 4. The hindwing is greyish yellow, and in the dry season its form is strongly irrorated (sprinkled) with dusky scales. With a prominent transverse brown discal fascia, its margins are highly sinuous. There is a brownish broad shade on the middle of the termen and some obscure lunular marks on the basal area. The antennae is pale, and the head, thorax and abdomen are dark brownish black; beneath that is a dull ochraceous white.

The female is similar, although the colours are duller. The cell of the upper side forewing has a more or less complete transverse black fascia and another at the discocellulars. A blue-centered well-marked ocelli is in interspaces 2 and 5 on the disc of the forewing, and smaller ocelli in interspaces 2 and 5 on the disc of the hindwing. The forewings and hindwings have a fairly well-defined pale subterminal line, though the blue spot on the anterior black area on the hindwing is small and ill-defined; the rest is as the male. The underside is also as the male, but generally has heavier and more clearly defined markings.

== Larva and pupa ==
The larva has a "ground-colour dark brown or grey with a broad dorsal stripe formed of minute white and blue spots, spines black." (Davidson & Aitken)

"The pupa is dull reddish, with an obtuse head in front. The thorax is dorsally convex and the abdomen has a dorsal and lateral row of small blackish points" (Moore).

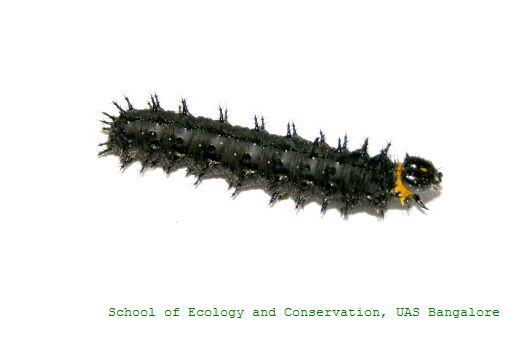
Caterpillar

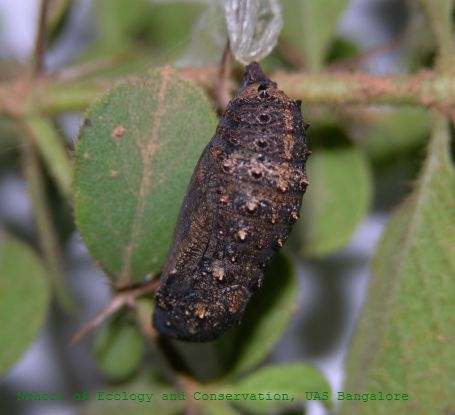
Pupa

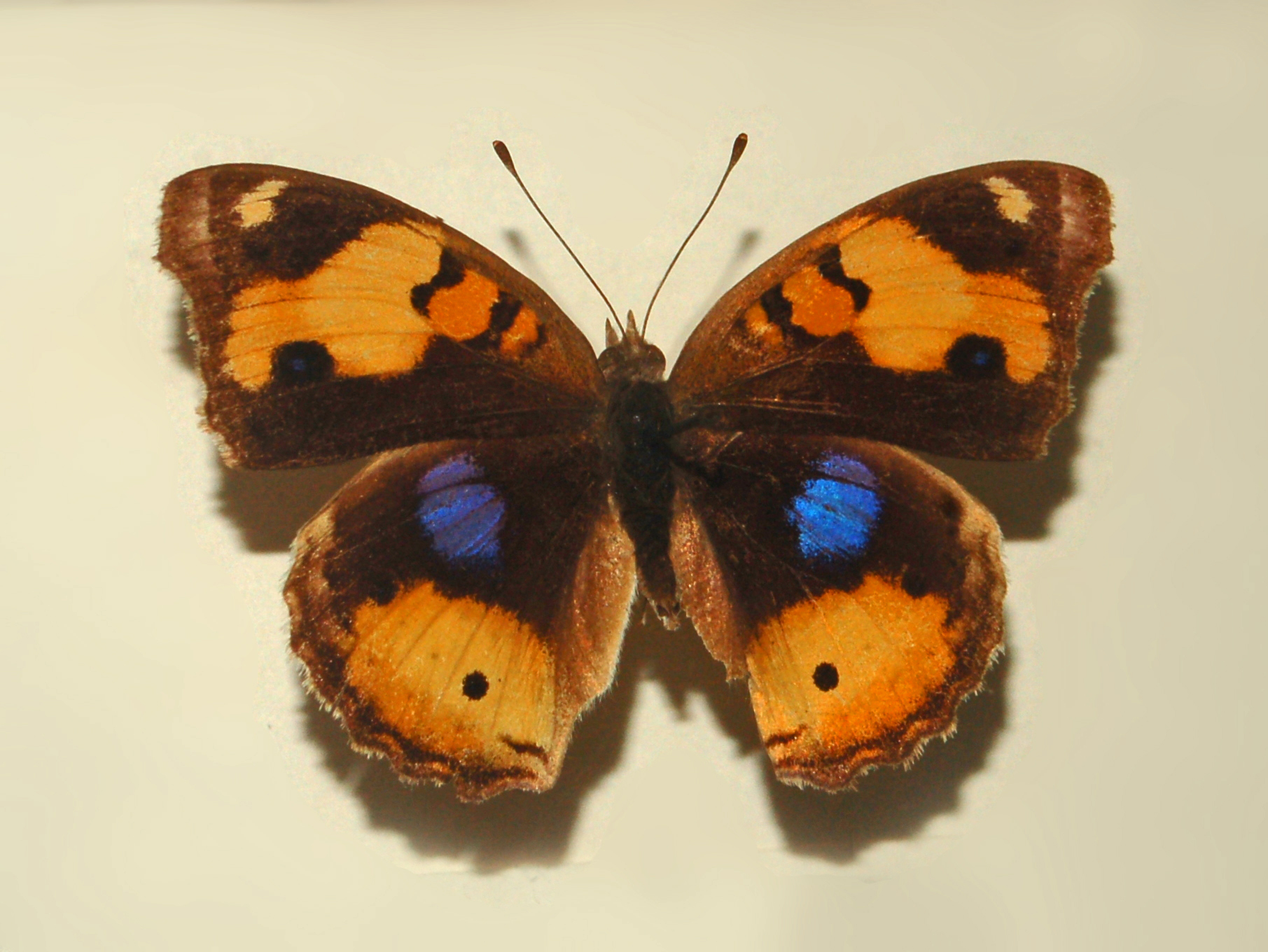
Mounted specimen

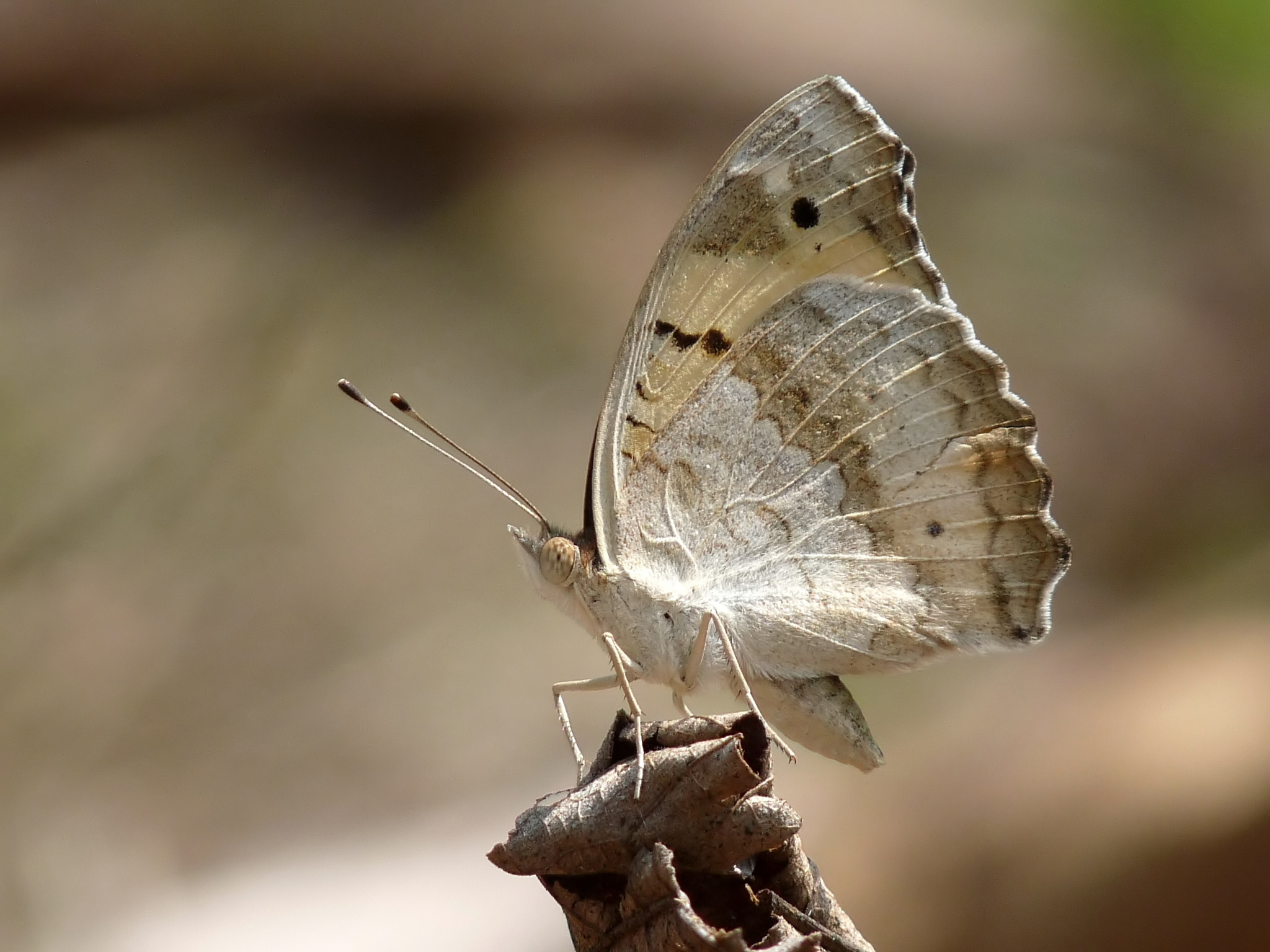
Underside

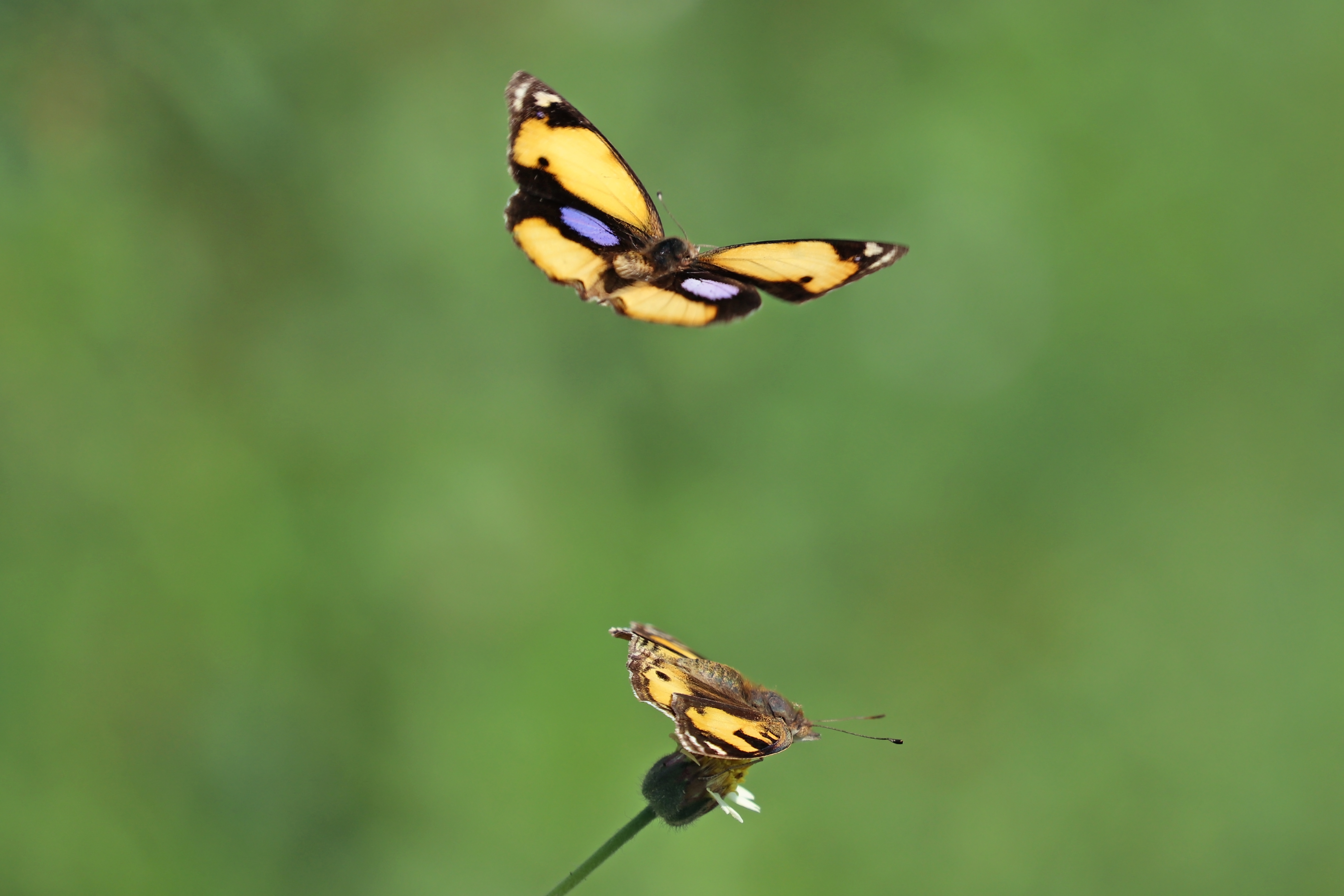
Courting

== Distribution ==
This species can be found in Africa and Southeast Asia.

== Subspecies ==
- Junonia hierta hierta (Fabricius, 1798) (southern Yunnan)
- Junonia hierta cebrene Trimen, 1870 (Africa-drier parts, Arabia)
- Junonia hierta paris Trimen, 1887 (Madagascar)
- Junonia hierta magna? (Evans, 1926) (Sikkim)

Torben Larsen developed a species numbering system for his 2005 publication Butterflies of West Africa. The subspecies cebrene is #815. The 'Larsen' numbers have since been used with permission in A Sharp Eye on Butterflies of Ghana.

== See also ==
- List of butterflies of India
