= River Muzizi =

Muzizi
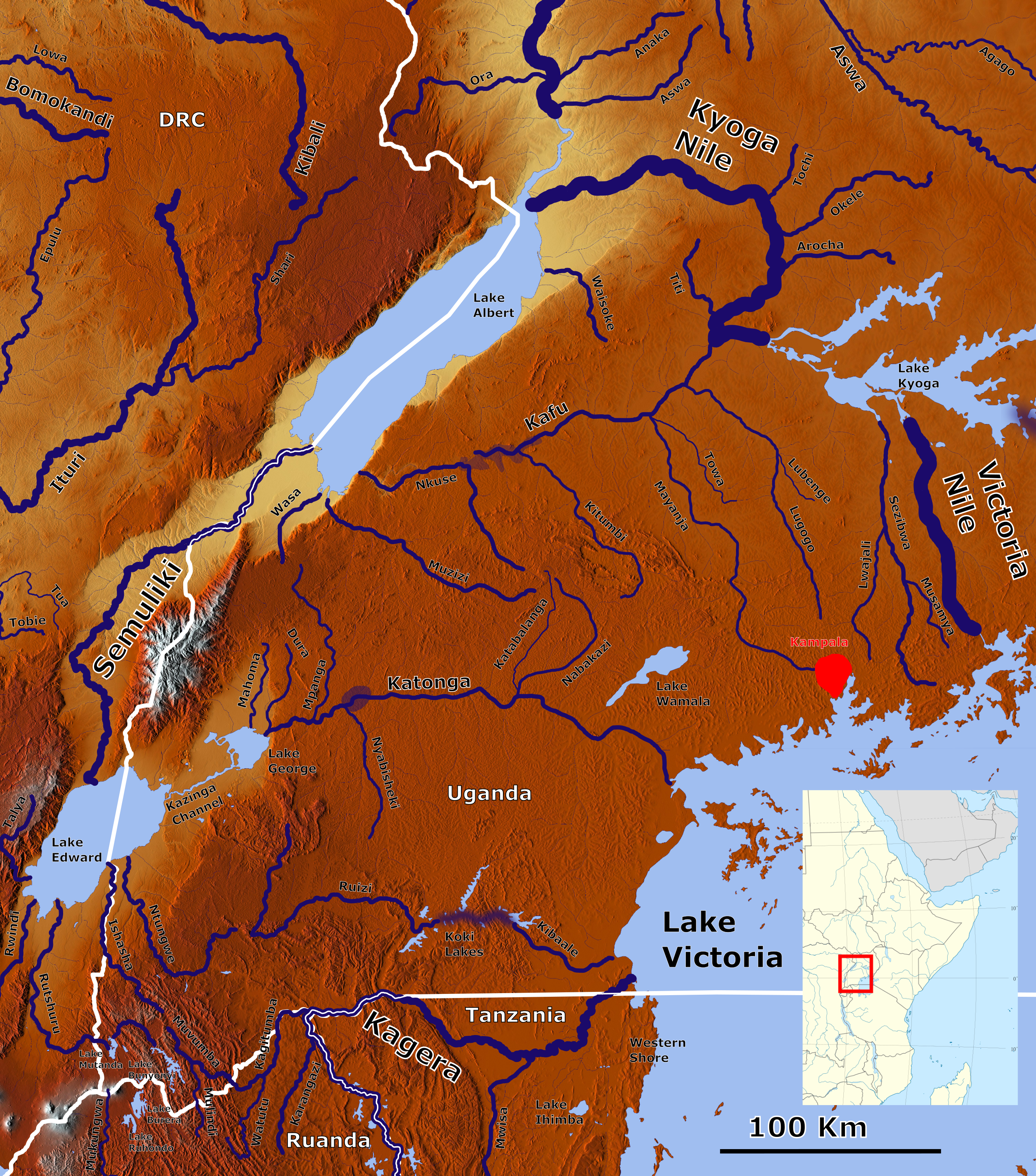

Location
- Country: Uganda

Physical characteristics
- Source: Mubende Hills, Mubende District
  - location: Mubende, Central Region, Uganda
  - coordinates: 00°34′38″N 31°11′42″E
  - elevation: 1,300 m (4,300 ft)
- Mouth: Lake Albert, Kagadi District
  - location: Ndaiga, Western Region, Uganda
  - coordinates: 01°00′32″N 30°32′13″E
  - elevation: 620 m (2,030 ft)
- Length: 120 km (75 mi)

River Muzizi is a river in Uganda, in East Africa. It separates the Two Banyakitara Kingdoms of (Amakama ga) Bunyoro-Kitara and Tooro

== Location ==
The River Muzizi is located in the western part of Uganda. It starts from the hills, northwest of the town of Mubende in Mubende District, Central Uganda. It flows in a northwestern direction to empty into the bay of Muziizi in Lake Albert locally known as Mwitanzige, near the border between Uganda and the Democratic Republic of the Congo.

The source of River Muzizi is located in Mubende, with coordinates: Latitude:0.5772; Longitude:31.1950. River Muzizi enters Lake Albert at Ndaiga, in Kagadi District, with coordinates: Latitude:1.0090; Longitude:30.5370. just few Kilometers east of Kanara town council in neighboring Ntoroko district. On its course northwestwards, the river traverses or forms the borders of the following districts : Mubende District, Kyegegwa District, Kibaale District, Kyenjojo District, Kabarole District, Kagadi District and Ntoroko District. At its source, the altitude is approximately 1,300 metres (4,300 ft). At its point of entry into Lake Albert, the altitude is approximately 620 metres (2,030 ft).

The length of River Muzizi is approximately 120 kilometres (75 mi) from source to mouth.

== Muzizi Power Station ==
Approximately 10 kilometres (6.2 mi), before River Muzizi empties into Lake Albert, it cascades from an elevation of approximately 1,000 metres (3,300 ft), above sea level to an elevation of about 700 metres (2,300 ft) above sea level over the Muziizi escarpment (Ekikonko kya Muziizi) a local name of the section of the Albertine Escarpment. At this site, the Government of Uganda, plans to construct a 26 MW min-hydropower station, known as Muzizi Power Station. Construction is expected to begin in 2013, with commissioning expected in 2018.

== See also ==
- Lake Albert
- Mubende
- Ndaiga
- Muzizi Power Station
