= Anne Mary Kobugabe Tumwine =

Ugandan politician

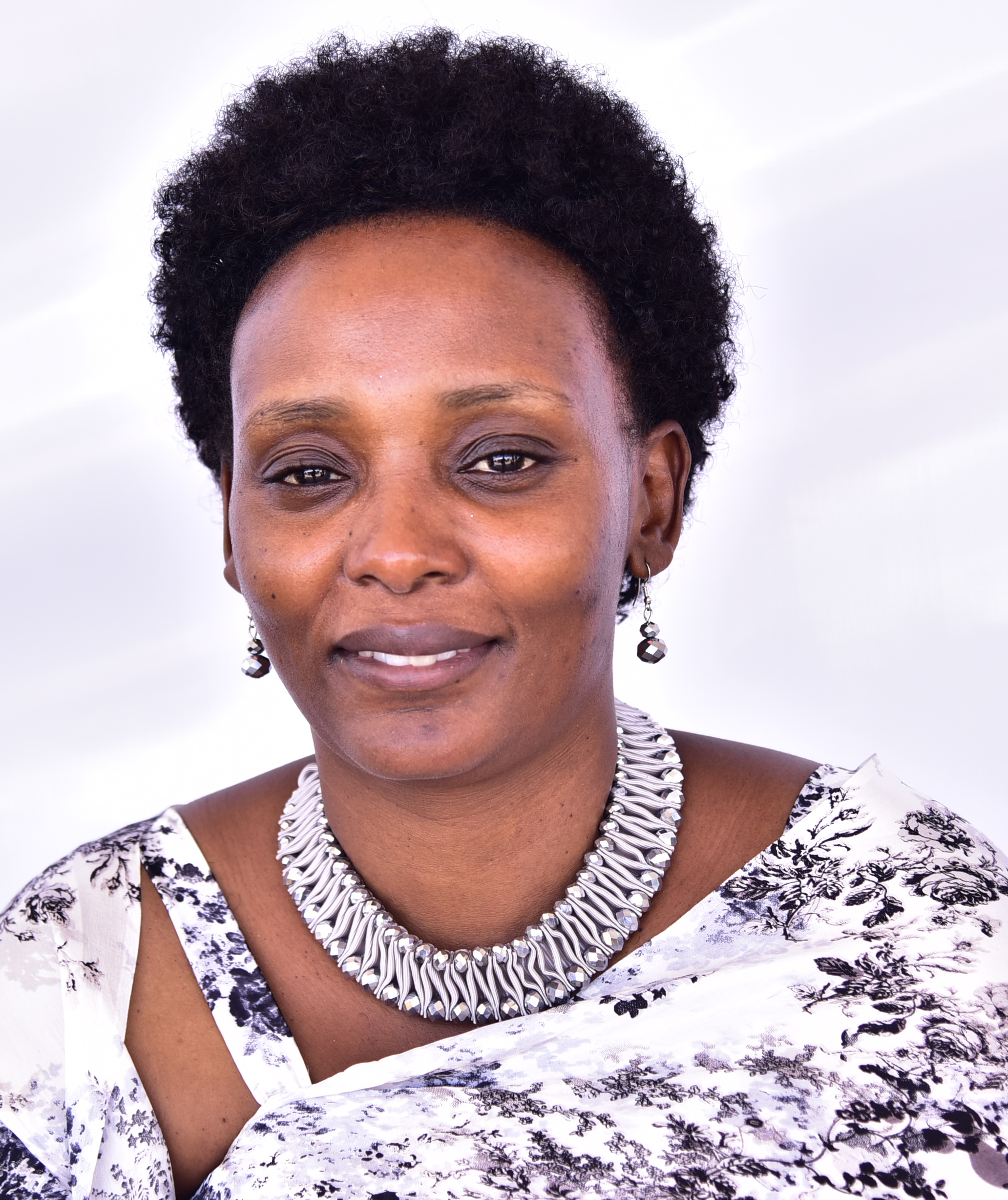
- Citizenship: Ugandan
- Education: Ndejje university (DPL); Makerere university (Crt)
- Occupations: Teacher, politician

Anne Mary Kobugabe Tumwine (born 9 September 1973) is a Ugandan teacher and politician and is a woman member of the 10th and 11th Parliament of Uganda as a representative from Ntoroko district and she is affiliated to the National Resistance Movement political party.

== Early life and education ==
Anne started school in 1990 and she attainted her Primary Leaving Examinations (PLE) Certificate from St. Peter and Paul Primary School then her Uganda Certificate of Education (UCE) in 1995 from St. Maria Gorretti, Fort Portal. She attainted a Certificate in Hotel and Institution Management at YWCA in 1996 then an ordinary diploma in Business Administration from Ndejje university in 2003. In 2005 she also attained a certificate in Public administration at Makerere university and a bachelor's degree of business administration from Bishop Stuart University, Mbarara in 2012.

== Career ==
=== Beginnings ===
In 1997–2000, Anne was a Receptionist/Cashier at Nile Hotel international the Sales and Customer Care Officer at Excel logistics 2000–2006. In 2007, 2008 and 2009 she was the director of Ebenezer Hope Primary School, Nakivale Hope Primary School and Trust Primary School, Mbarara respectively and now she is as well the Project Administrator at RWCA/Trust Children Centre.

=== Political career ===
Anne was a woman member of the 10th Parliament of Uganda as a representative from Ntoroko district and she part of the National Resistance Movement. She is the woman member of parliament elect in the 11th Ugandan Parliament from Ntoroko district for 2021–2026.

== Personal life ==
Anne is married to Apostle Willy Tumwine of the Mbarara town based Holy Spirit Fire Church. Apostle Tumwine is a resident of Rwanyamehembe Sub County- Kashari- Mbarara district and Education of young people; women welfare and guidance are some her hobbies.

== See also ==
- List of members of the eleventh Parliament of Uganda
- List of members of the tenth Parliament of Uganda
- National Resistance Movement
- Ntoroko district
- Parliament of Uganda
