= Cadaba insularis =

Conservation status
- Critically Endangered (IUCN 3.1)

Scientific classification
- Kingdom: Plantae
- Clade: Tracheophytes
- Clade: Angiosperms
- Clade: Eudicots
- Clade: Rosids
- Order: Brassicales
- Family: Capparaceae
- Genus: Cadaba
- Species: C. insularis

Binomial name
- Cadaba insularis A.G.Mill.

Species of flowering plant

Cadaba insularis is a critically endangered shrub in the Capparaceae family endemic to the island of Socotra in Yemen. Its natural habitat is subtropical or tropical dry shrubland, and is threatened by habitat loss.
