= Semliki Wildlife Reserve =

Ugandan nature preserve

- Toro-Semliki Wildlife Reserve
- IUCN category III (natural monument or feature)
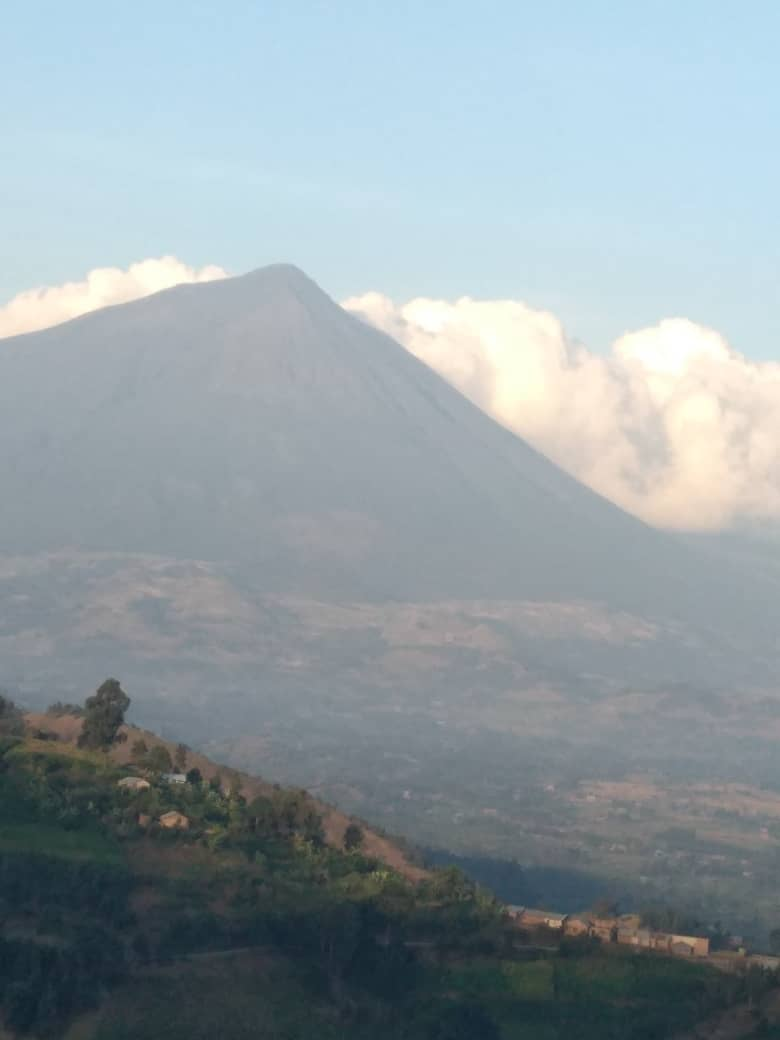

- Location within Uganda
- Location: Kabarole and Ntoroko districts
- Nearest city: Fort Portal
- Coordinates: 00°53′50″N 30°21′48″E
- Area: 542 km^{2} (209 sq mi)
- Established: 1929; 97 years ago
- Governing body: Uganda Wildlife Authority

Semliki Wildlife Reserve is a protected area in the Western Region of Uganda with headquarters at Karugutu in Ntoroko District. It was established as a game park in 1926 and was among the earliest protected areas to be gazetted in the country.

== Geography ==
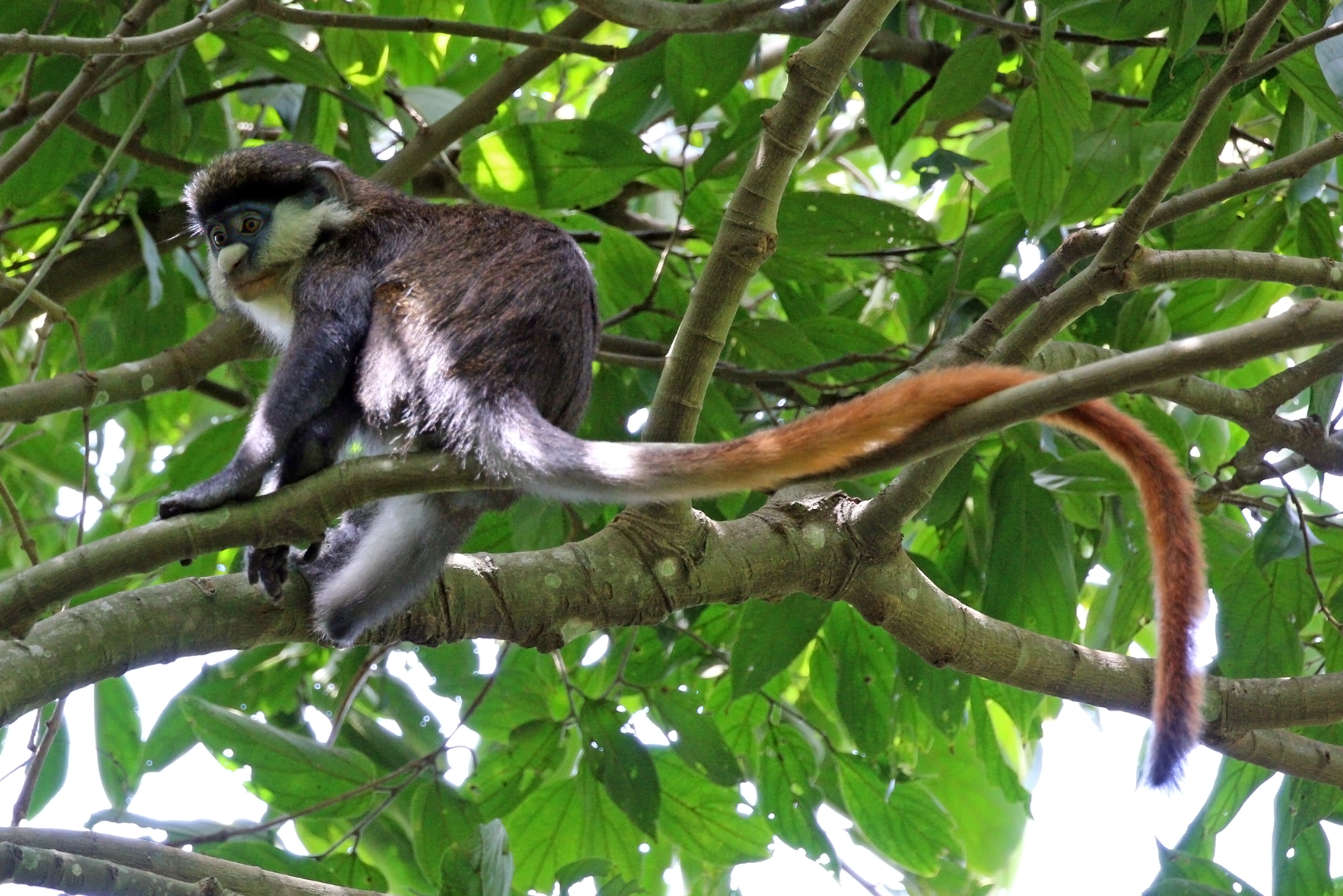
Red-tailed monkey (Cercopithecus ascanius), Semliki Wildlife Reserve

Semliki Wildlife Reserve is located in Kabarole and Ntoroko districts, in the Toro sub-region, on the floor of the rift valley, where Lake Albert, the Rwenzori Mountains and the Kijura escarpment create backdrops. It is generally low-lying, with elevations starting at around 700 meters above sea level. Although the reserve itself is topographically flat, its setting is dramatic, with the steep Rift Valley escarpment rising sharply from the eastern shores of Lake Albert. On clear days, the Congolese Blue Mountains are visible on the western horizon, while the glaciated peaks of the Rwenzori Mountains can be seen to the southwest. It is traversed by River Wasa, which originates in the Rwenzori Mountains.

=== Hydrology ===
Several river systems drain from the Rwenzori Mountains foothills across the reserve toward Lake Albert. The environmental clearinghouse lists the Wasa River system, Mugiri River system, and Nyaburogo, with River Muzizi forming part of the northern boundary area. Historic records also describe the reserve as traversed by the River Wasa, noted as permanent because it originates from the Rwenzori Mountains.

== Habitats ==
The dominant vegetation is open acacia-combretum woodland and grassy savanna, intercepted with patches of Borassus palm forest. Significant belts of riparian woodland occur along major watercourses, while extensive swamps and marches are found toward Lake Albert.

== History ==
First established in 1926 as a game reserve by the British colonial government, the reserve is one of the oldest protected areas in Uganda extending from the Kijura escarpment, north to the River Muzizi and Lake Albert to the low Butuku plains in the West. It covers an area of 542 km^{2} (209 sq mi).

Since 2005, the area is considered a Lion Conservation Unit.

== Biodiversity ==
=== Flora ===
The dominant vegetation in Semliki is open Acacia-Combretum woodland and grassy savanna, interspersed with patches of Borassus palm forest. There is significant belts of riparian woodland along the main watercourses, and extensive swamps towards Lake Albert.

=== Mammals ===
Historic listings for Toro Game Reserve identify Uganda kob as a dominant species, alongside waterbuck, reedbuck, hartebeest, warthog, buffalo, hippopotamus, African bush elephant, lion, leopard, and several primates and bird species.

Wildlife has partially recovered from the poaching that took a heavy toll during the civil war. The Ugandan kob (Kobus kob) population, which plummeted below 1,000 in the early 1990s, today totals several thousand. More than 1,000 African buffalo are resident, up from about 50 in the early 1990s anAfrican bush elephant]] and waterbuck numbers are growing too.

Leopards are still common, while lions are gradually re-colonizing the area. Primates are well represented with black-and-white colobus, olive baboon and red-tailed and vervet monkey all visible in suitable habitats, while a community of perhaps 70 chimpanzees is resident in Mugiri River Forest. The lion population has declined to about five individuals, due to a reduced prey base during the 1980s civil war period and continued pressures, including illegal grazing and associated conflict.

=== Birds ===
The landscape around Toro-Semiliki includes habitats associated with the shoebill stork, particularly the marches and the wetlands near Lake Albert. The reserve supports a high diverse of bird life, with approximately 440 recorded bird species, reflecting the range of savanna, woodland, forest, riverine and wetland habitats present. Notable species recorded in the reserve include the Abyssinian ground hornbill, red-necked falcon and black-billed barbet, among many others.

== Management ==
The reserve is managed by the Uganda Wildlife Authority as part of Uganda’s protected area system. Petroleum development initiatives in the Albertine Graben, alongside infrastructure proposals including road upgrading, transmission lines, and water schemes, have increased the need for environmental sensitivity analysis to guide siting and management decisions in and around Toro-Semliki.

== See also ==
- East African rift valley
