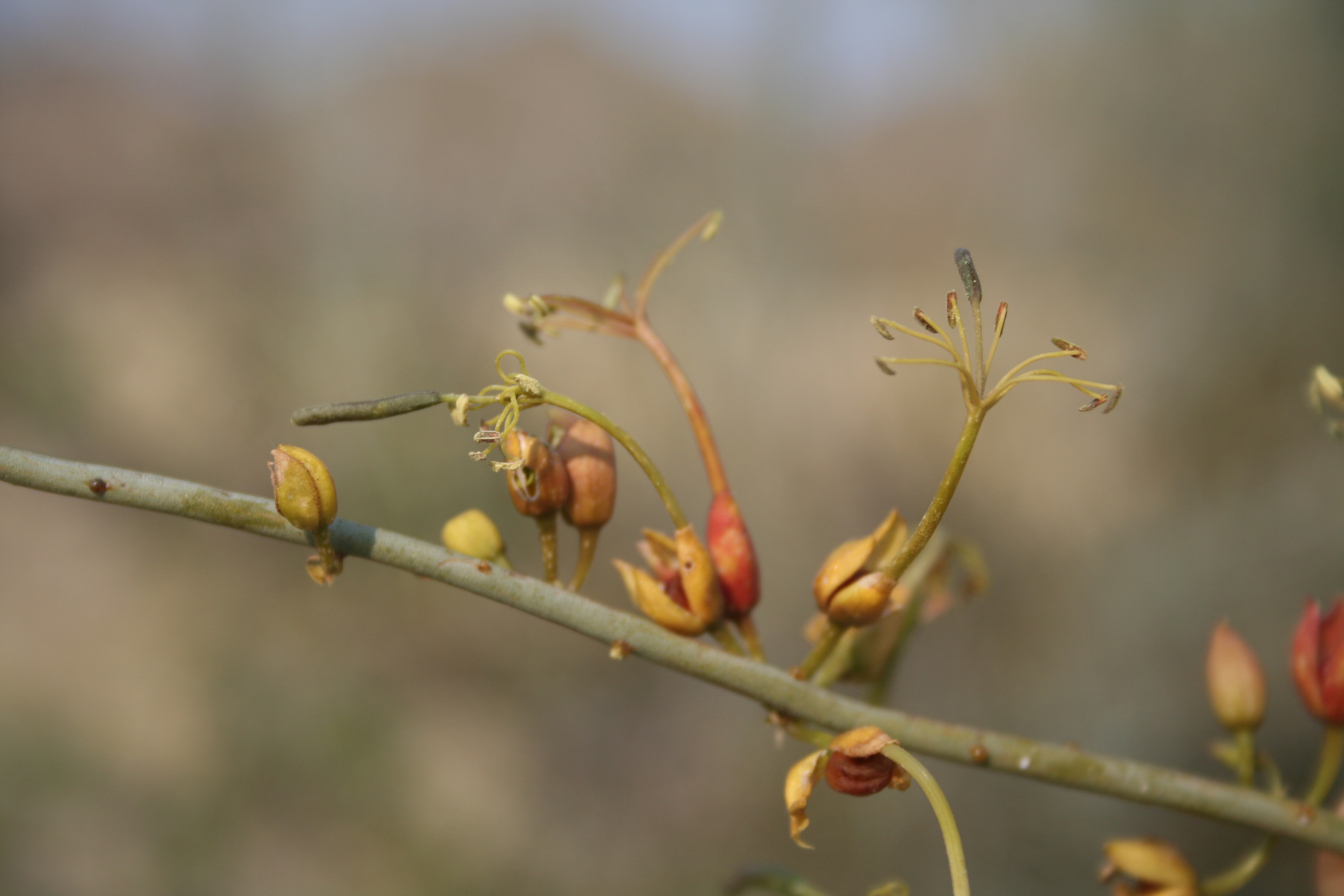

Scientific classification
- Kingdom: Plantae
- Clade: Tracheophytes
- Clade: Angiosperms
- Clade: Eudicots
- Clade: Rosids
- Order: Brassicales
- Family: Capparaceae
- Genus: Cadaba
- Species: C. aphylla

Binomial name
- Cadaba aphylla (Thunb.) Wild

Synonyms
- Cadaba juncea Harv.; Cadaba juncea Szyszył.; Cadaba juncea Harv. ex Hook. f. nom. illegit.; Schepperia juncea DC.; Cleome aphylla Thunb.; Cleome chrysogyna Gilg ex Heilbr.; Cleome ecuadorica Heilborn; Cleome intermedia Heilborn; Cleome juncea Sparrm. (1780) (1780), non Berg. (1767); Cleome longistyla Heilborn; Cleome pichinchensis Heilborn; Cleome sodiroi Gilg ex Heilbr.

= Cadaba aphylla =

Species of flowering plant

Cadaba aphylla ("Swartstorm") is one of the many species in the genus Cadaba. It is indigenous to southern Africa.

== Description ==
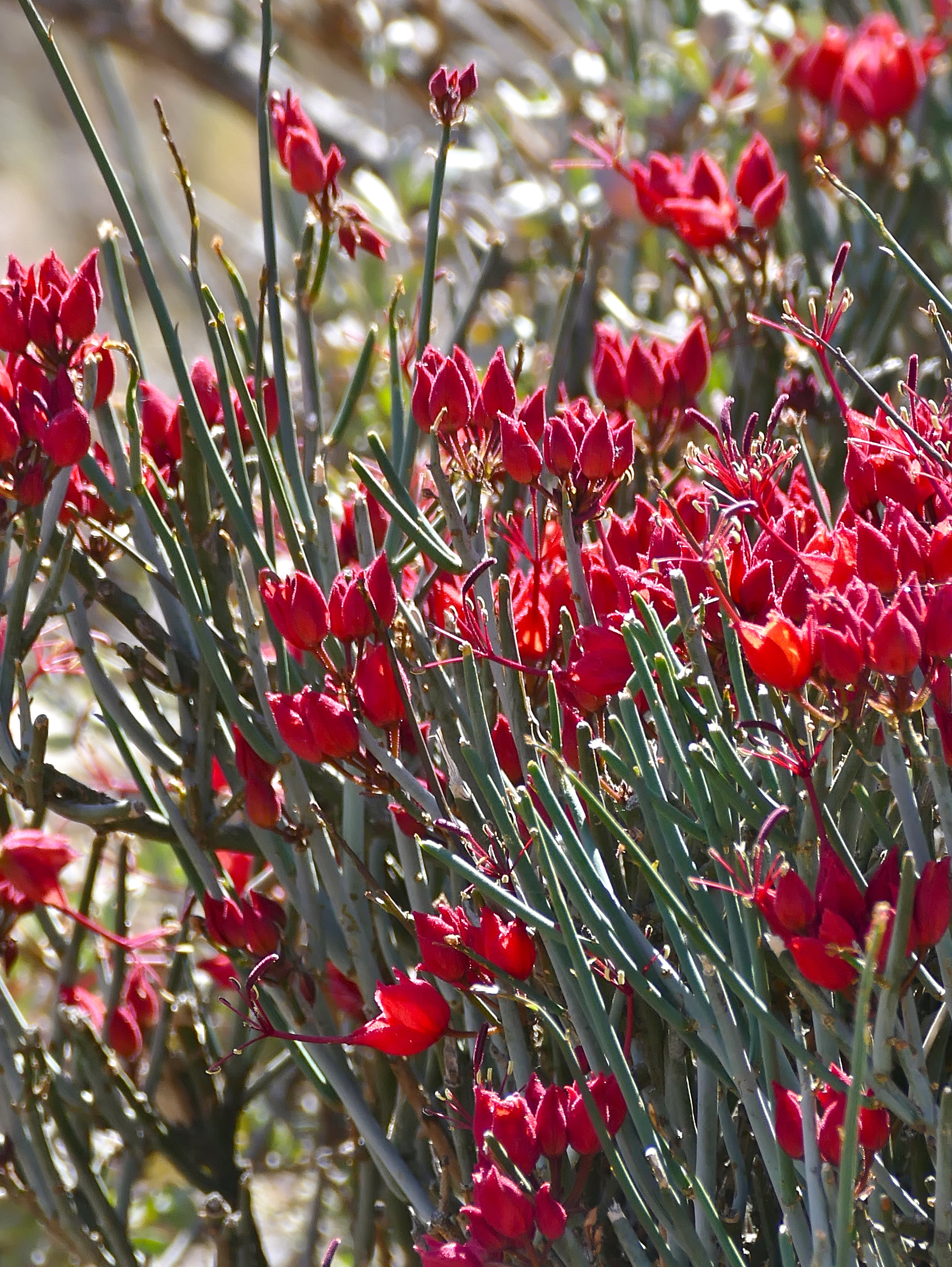
Cadaba aphylla specimen in flower.

It grows as a straggly, perennial shrub or small tree, virgate, much-branched, dark green, often with purple bloom, and usually leafless, and may reach 2 meters in height. Its branches are somewhat succulent and frequently spine-tipped. Leaves of some 10 x 2 mm are found on seedlings and young branchlets.

Its deep-red flowers (rarely yellow) in axillary clusters have prominently exserted stamens, making this a colourful plant in summer. Fruits are some 90 mm in length, green at first, turning a rusty brown when mature, and covered in sticky hairs. A sticky orange pulp covers the small black seeds.

"Leafless, twiggy shrub to 2 m. tall; branches rather virgate, stiff, smooth, green or glaucous with subspinous apices, glabrous, young branches with subulate leaf scales up to 2 mm. long. Flowers in short, corymbose, axillary racemes; rhachis 0.3–2.3 cm. long, glabrous or glandular-pubescent; bracts subulate, c. 1 mm. long; pedicels glabrous or glandular-pubescent, up to 1.3 cm. long. Sepals 4, yellow or reddish-purple, 1–1.7 x 0.7–1 cm., the lowest rather larger than the remainder, connate at the base into a very shallow receptacle c. 1 mm. in depth, broadly elliptic, obtuse at the apex, with capitate, glandular hairs densely or sparsely scattered on both sides. Petals 0. Androgynophore 2.5–3 mm. long, glabrous, shallowly declinate with a hooded nectary at its base c. 4 mm. broad. Stamens 8; filaments 1 cm. long; anthers 2.3 x 0.75 mm., oblong. Gynophore c. 1 cm. long, glabrous or glandular-pubescent. Ovary narrowly cylindric, glabrous or glandular-pubescent; ovules numerous, on 2 placentas; stigma capitate, sessile. Fruit up to 8 x 0.4 cm., cylindric, subtorulose, glandular or minutely verrucose, many-seeded. Seeds brown, c. 0.3 cm. in diam., subglobose."

— Hiram Wild (Flora Zambesiaca)

== Distribution ==
This species may occur in dry bushveld or semidesert conditions from tropical Africa to Namibia, Zimbabwe, Botswana, and South Africa. At its southern extent, it occurs in clay-rich soils in the Little Karoo and Overberg regions, as far south-west as the town of Montagu.
