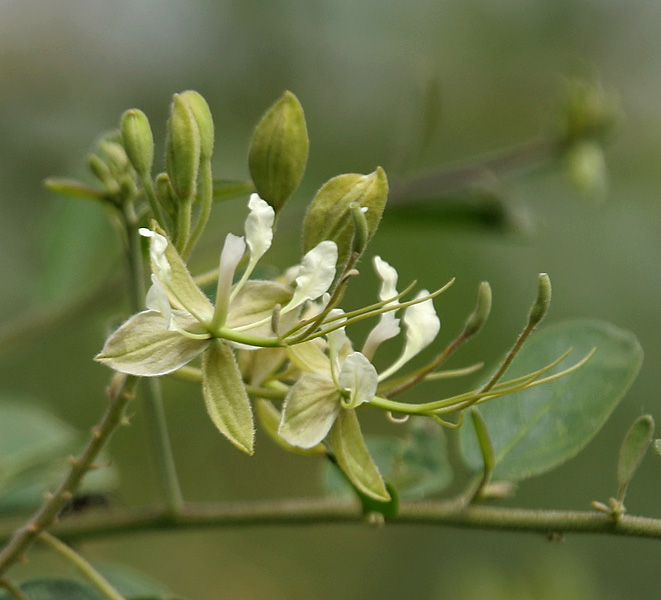

Scientific classification
- Kingdom: Plantae
- Clade: Tracheophytes
- Clade: Angiosperms
- Clade: Eudicots
- Clade: Rosids
- Order: Brassicales
- Family: Capparaceae
- Genus: Cadaba
- Species: C. fruticosa

Binomial name
- Cadaba fruticosa (L.) Druce

Synonyms
- Cleome fruticosa L.

= Cadaba fruticosa =

Species of flowering plant

Cadaba fruticosa is a species of flowering plant in the family Capparaceae. It is a shrub native to Bangladesh, India, and Sri Lanka on the Indian Subcontinent.

Its habitat includes the dry parts of the Gangetic plain, down through the Vindhya Range, to Deccan thorn scrub forests in southern India and dry forests of northern Sri Lanka. It is threatened by habitat loss. It is known from to the Gangetic Plain of northern India and Bangladesh, south to Madhya Pradesh, Maharashtra and Telangana. It is found in Rayalaseema, central and eastern parts of Karnataka and south to Tamil Nadu, west to rainshadow regions around Palakkad and Punalur.

In Tamil Nadu, Cadaba fruticosa is known as '"vizhuthi" (Tamil: விழுதி (viļuti)) and used in Siddha medicine for more than 2000 years. The juice of the leaves is especially used to cure gonorrhoea (Tamil: வெண்மேகம் (věṇmēkam)).
