= Ntoroko =

Kanara Town Council Ntoroko
- Location in Uganda
- Coordinates: 01°03′00″N 30°32′06″E
- Country: Uganda
- Region: Western Uganda
- Sub-region: Rwenzori sub-region
- District: Ntoroko District
- Elevation: 2,044 ft (623 m)
- Time zone: UTC+3 (East African Standard Time)

Ntoroko is a town officially known as Kanara Town Council in Ntoroko District Western Uganda. It is one of the four town councils of Ntoroko District the others being Karugutu, Rwebisengo and Kibuku Town Council. Ntoroko is the largest fishing town on the southern Mwitanzige (Lake Albert) shore. Its located on the Ntoroko bay extending from Kanara Fishing village to the western half of the Ntoroko Peninsula (the eastern half making part of the Tooro Semliki Wildlife reserve). The peninsular also separates Ntoroko bay from the Muziizi Bay. By Road, Ntoroko town is approximately 84 km Northwest of Fort Portal City, the regional Capital and approximately 79 km via Karugutu, north of Kibuku Town Council the District Capital. Ntoroko/Kanara Town Council is settled by (like most Ugandan lake shore towns) many ethnicities, the largest being;Rwenzori Peoples; Batooro/Batuku, Bakonzo, Bamba, Babwisi. Bunyoro peoples; Bagangaizi, Bagungu and other Banyoro. Alur, Lendu and Ngite. Congolese of the Western Mwitanzige shore; Alur, Gegere, Nande, to mention but a few.

== Location ==
Ntoroko is located approximately 78 kilometres (48 mi), by road, north-east of Fort Portal, the nearest large city. This location lies approximately 371 kilometres (231 mi), by road, northwest of Kampala, the capital of Uganda, and the largest city in that country. The geographical coordinates of Ntoroko town are: 1°03'00.0"N, 30°32'06.0"E (Latitude:1.0500; Longitude: 30.5350). The average elevation of Ntoroko is 623 metres (2,044 ft) above sea-level.

== Overview ==
Ntoroko is a small town officially Called Kanara Town Council on the southern shores of Mwitanzige/ Lake Albert. The town sits at an altitude of 623 meters, above sea level. The predominant ethnicities in the town are the Batooro/Batuku and the Bakonzo. However other ethnicities coexist with them including the Bamba/Babwisi Bakiga, Banyoro and the Banyarwanda. Ntoroko was elevated to a town council and officially renamed Kanara Town Council when Ntoroko District, in July 2010, was created from Bundibugyo District.

== Points of interest ==
The following points of interest are found in or near Ntoroko: (a) SDV Transami Ntoroko (b) the offices of Kanara Town Council (c) Ntoroko Central Market, the largest source of fresh produce in the town (d) the southern shores of Lake Albert (e) the mouth of river Wasa (f) the Muziizi escuary (g) Tooro Semliki Wildlife reserve (h) Semliki Safari Lodge (i) Ntoroko peninsular and beach (j) Kijura-Muziizi escarpment, John Baruga recreation center, Sande Kitebere refreshment center, WhatsApp Bar and lodge, Lake Albert Safari Lodge and a hospitable population.

== See also ==
- Lakes in Uganda
- Ntoroko District
- Rwenzoris
- Muzizi Station
- Western Uganda
