= Muzizi Hydroelectric Power Station =

Power station in Uganda

Muzizi Power Station
- Map of Uganda showing the location of Muzizi Power Station
- Country: Uganda
- Location: Ndaiga, Hoima District
- Coordinates: 00°57′54″N 30°32′42″E
- Status: Proposed

Dam and spillways
- Impounds: River Muzizi

Reservoir
- Normal elevation: 900 m (3,000 ft)

Power Station
- Commission date: 2021 (expected)
- Type: Run-of-the-river
- Turbines: 8
- Installed capacity: 45 MW (60,000 hp)

The Muzizi Power Station is a proposed 45 megawatts (60,000 hp) hydroelectric power project in Uganda. The project, which has been planned for several years, has received a funding commitment from KfW and the French Development Agency.

== Location ==
The power station is located across the River Muzizi, which forms the border between the Kagadi District and the Ntoroko District, close to the south-eastern shores of Lake Albert, in the Western Region. This location is approximately 10 kilometres (6.2 mi), by road, south-west of the town of Ndaiga in Hoima District. The station is approximately 292 kilometres (181 mi), by road, north-northwest of Kampala, the capital and largest city of Uganda.

== Overview ==
As early as 1999, the site of the power station was identified by the government of Uganda as a potential mini-hydropower site. At first, a 10 megawatt project was anticipated. Later, the planned capacity of the project was increased to 26 megawatts. In December 2010, bids for an environmental impact study, power station design, and cost estimation were solicited in the Ugandan media. More recently, the projected capacity has been increased to 44.7 megawatts.

== History ==
Initially, construction was expected to start in 2015, with commissioning planned for 2018. Later, the projected start date was moved to 2017, with commissioning planned in 2019. Commencement of construction has been further postponed until 2019, with commissioning planned for 2021. It is anticipated that the power generated will enter the national grid at a new substation, close to the power station, along a new 132 kilovolt transmission line from Hoima to the Mputa area, continuing to Fort Portal and on to the Nkenda sub-station in Kasese.

In November 2019, Post Media Limited, reported that the Engineering, Procurement and Construction (EPC) contract had been awarded to Strabag, an Austrian construction company. At that time, a memorandum of understanding, between Strabag and the Uganda Ministry of Finance was pending, following which, construction would commence.

== Construction costs ==
In 2007, the construction cost was estimated at US$30 million for a 10 megawatts (13,000 hp) project. The feasibility studies were funded by a €1.5 million grant from KfW. As of August 2015, the funding for the project breaks down as depicted in the table below:

Funding Sources for Muzizi Power Station
Rank	Funder	Amount in Euros	US$ Equivalent	Percentage	Notes
1	KfW	40.0 million	42.6 million	36.36	Loan
2	KfW	5.0 million	5.3 million	4.55	Grant
3	Agence Française de Développement (AFD)	45.0 million	47.9 million	40.91	Loan
4	Government of Uganda	20 million	21.3 million	18.18	Equity
	All	110 million	117 million	100.00	Total

In 2017, the European Union gave the cost of the project as €123.3 million, to which the EU would contribute €20.5 million in loans.

== Recent developments ==
In 2014, it was reported that the scope of the project had been increased to 44.7 megawatts from the original 26 megawatts. Two interconnected dams, Muzizi A (26 megawatts) and Muzizi B (18.7 megawatts), are now proposed.

The developer was going to be the Uganda Electricity Generation Company Limited (UEGCL), a government parastatal, in partnership with a private investor. In February 2014, UEGCL applied to Uganda's Electricity Regulatory Authority for a license to generate up to 44.7 megawatts of power at Muzizi. Once the license was granted, the plan was for UEGCL to search for the investor and proceed with construction.

In May 2015, however, the Cabinet of Uganda decided to develop Muzizi without the private investor. Government resolved to borrow from the French Development Agency and KfW to fund the construction. The funds include the cost of building the high-voltage transmission lines that will evacuate the power to the point where it will be integrated into the national electricity grid.

In August 2015, UEGCL, the implementing Uganda government agency, selected the consulting engineers, who will review feasibility studies that have been done by other companies, design the project, and prepare tender documents for a fee of €3,959,771 (about UGX:15.5 billion). The energy generated is enough to supply 1,000,000 new customers.

Bids for civil works and electrical works were advertised in July 2017. UEGCL is the owner-developer entity.

== See also ==
- List of power stations in Uganda
