= Nobel Mayombo =

Ugandan military officer, lawyer and legislator

Noble Mayombo
- Born: 9 April 1965; Uganda
- Died: 1 May 2007 (aged 42); Agha Khan Hospital, Nairobi
- Citizenship: Uganda
- Education: Makerere University (Bachelor of Laws) (Master of Laws); Law Development Centre (Diploma in Legal Practice)
- Occupations: Military Officer, Lawyer
- Years active: 1982 – 2007
- Known for: Politics & Military Affairs
- Spouse: Juliet Mayombo

Brigadier Noble Mayombo (1965–2007) was a Ugandan military officer, lawyer and legislator.

== Background ==
He was born in Kabarole District, Toro sub-region, Western Uganda, in 1965. He belonged to the Babiito Royal Clan in the Kingdom of Toro, one of the four constitutional monarchies in modern-day Uganda. His father, Canon James Rwabwoni, born in 1926, was still alive in 2007. He died in a South African hospital on 25 December 2009. Mayombo was the seventh born out of twelve children. Their mother, the late Beatrice Rwaboni Abwooli, died in 1997.

== Education ==
He attended Nyakasura School in Fort Portal and Ntare School in Mbarara. He was admitted to Makerere University to study Law. However, in 1985, at the age of 20, he left Makerere to join the National Resistance Army (NRA), in their guerrilla war against the Obote II regime (1980–1985) and the military junta (1985–1986) that ousted him.

After the NRA captured power in 1986, Mayombo returned to the university and finished his law degree, graduating with a Bachelor of Laws (LLB). He then obtained the Diploma in Legal Practice, that is required to practice law in Uganda, from the Law Development Centre in Kampala. He also held the degree of Master of Laws (LLM), specialising in Human Rights law, from Makerere University.

== Work experience ==
In 1994, he was appointed by the Ugandan military to be one of the delegates to the Constituent Assembly that drafted the 1995 Ugandan Constitution. At age 29 years, Lieutenant Mayombo was the youngest member of the Constituent Assembly. He distinguished himself as an avid debater with a solid knowledge of the law and with a sense of humour. Following the ratification of the new constitution, Mayombo was appointed to represent the Ugandan military in the Ugandan Parliament. He resigned that position on 30 January 2006, to take up an appointment as Permanent Secretary in the Ministry of Defence.

He was appointed President Museveni's ADC where he displayed an insatiable sense of dedication and loyalty to the Movement system of government. One of the most enduring images was the ADC squatting after noticing that the shoelaces of the president were untied and promptly tying them. He received rapid promotion through the military ranks, quickly rising through Lieutenant, Captain, Major, Lieutenant Colonel to full Colonel by 2004. By that time he was the Director of Military Intelligence. As Military Intelligence Director, he gained notoriety, where he was accused torturing suspected rebels. During the same period, the Ugandan security organs were accused of the creation and maintenance of "safe houses", where arrested suspects were detained incommunicado beyond the 48-hour limit prescribed by law, without any charges being brought in court. It was under Brigadier Mayombo's reign as Director of Military Intelligence, that the People's Redemption Army under Colonel Kiiza Besigye was first brought to the attention of Ugandans. Besigye was later to deny this and other accusations linking him to Joseph Kony's Lord's Resistance Army in Northern Uganda. Brigadier Mayombo himself confronted Besigye over a radio talk show on KFM's Hot Seat programme one evening. This was to reduce Besigye's popularity and maybe even affected his performance in the next presidential elections.

In October 2005, Colonel Mayombo was promoted to brigadier and appointed Permanent Secretary to the Ministry of Defense. In November 2005, he was appointed Chairman of the board of directors at the New Vision Group, the publishers of the Uganda government-owned newspaper New Vision.

== Last days ==
On Thursday 27 April 2007, Brigadier Mayombo felt unwell and was admitted to Kololo Hospital, a small private hospital on Kololo Hill. He was diagnosed with acute pancreatitis, a sudden inflammation of the pancreas, which causes the organ to leak its enzymes into the surrounding tissues and organs, leading the pancreas and surrounding organs to start digesting themselves (autodigestion).

The next day, his condition having worsened, he was transferred to the Intensive Care Unit at International Hospital Kampala. His condition deteriorated further and on Sunday 29 April 2007, comatose, on life-support systems, he was flown to Agha Khan Hospital in Nairobi, Kenya. The Ugandan president, Yoweri Museveni, gave permission for the presidential Gulfstream IV-SP to be used to fly Mayombo from Entebbe to Nairobi. On Tuesday, 1 May 2007 at 15.00 local time, Mayombo died at Agha Khan Hospital in Nairobi of complications arising from acute pancreatitis. He was 42 years old.

== After his death ==
Mayombo's sudden death was received with shock in Uganda. There was a lot of speculation that he might have been poisoned which prompted the Uganda government to launch an investigation into the cause of his death. A three-person team was named to carry out the investigation; its members were Dr Peter Mugenyi, then the director of the Joint Clinical Research Centre, Colonel James Mugira, commander of the Uganda People's Defence Force Tank Unit, and Lieutenant Tagaswire Rusoke, a biochemist in the UPDF. The team concluded their investigation and handed their report to President Museveni in November 2007. As of February 2015, the detailed findings of that probe have not been publicised.

Following a period of public viewing at the Parliament Building in Uganda's capital, Kampala, Mayombo's body was taken to Kololo Airstrip for a state funeral attended by Ugandan Cabinet members, senior members of the Ugandan military, diplomats accredited to Uganda and delegations from several countries including Rwanda, Kenya, Southern Sudan, the Democratic Republic of the Congo, the East African Community and South Africa. He was buried at his ancestral home in Kijura, Kabarole District, on Saturday 5 May 2007. He was survived by his father, Canon James Rwaboni, his widow, Mrs. Juliet Mayombo, his older brother, Phillip Winyi, his younger brother Okwir Rwaboni and his six children:

1. Charlene Komuntale, born in 1991
2. Samora Olimi, born in 1992
3. Isabelle Byanjeru, born in 1995
4. Natalie Kabasweka, born in 2003
5. Nicole Komukyeya, born in 2005
6. Kamurasi Noble Mayombo II, born in 2006.

== See also ==
- Uganda People's Defense Force
- Toro Kingdom
- Acute pancreatitis
- Ugandan Parliament
- Uganda Government
