= Karugutu, Uganda =

Ugandan settlement

Karugutu
- Map of Uganda showing the location of Karugutu.
- Coordinates: 00°47′22″N 30°13′37″E
- Country: Uganda
- Region: Western Region
- Sub-region: Rwenzori Sub-Region
- District: Ntoroko District
- Elevation: 1,102 m (3,615 ft)
- Time zone: UTC+3 (EAT)

Karugutu is a settlement in the Western Region of Uganda. The name "Karugutu" applies to;

- Karugutu Subcounty seating at Itojo Townboard, one of the three traditional subcounties of Ntoroko County, others being Rwebisengo and Kanara Subcounties.
- Karugutu Town Council elevated and separated from Karugutu S/County in 2010 when Ntoroko diatrict was Curved from her Mother district; Bundibugyo.

== Location ==
Karugutu is located in Ntoroko District, in Western Uganda, approximately 23 kilometres (14 mi), by road, east of the town of Kibuuku, where the district headquarters are located. The geographical coordinates of Karugutu, Uganda are 0°47'22.0"N, 30°13'37.0"E (Latitude:0.789444; Latitude:30.226944). The average elevation of Karugutu is 1,102 metres (3,615 ft) above sea level. Karugutu is bordered by Tooro-Semliki Wildlife Reserve in Rwebisengo s/county to the north, Nombe s/County to the east, Kasitu S/county in Bughendera, Bundibugyo district to the south, Kibuuku town council and Bweramule S/County to the west.

== Overview ==
Karugutu town lies along the Fort Portal–Bundibugyo-Lamia Road, where the Karugutu-Ntoroko Road does a T-Off northwards to Mwitanzige or Lake Albert, immediately south of the Tooro-Semliki Wildlife Reserve. The Uganda National Roads Authority (UNRA), has plans to upgrade the 57 kilometres (35 mi) Karugutu–Ntoroko Road, one of 11 "oil roads" to class II bituminous surface, with culverts and drainage channels. The Environmental and Social Impact Assessment (ESIA) for the upgrade of this road was completed in 2017.

The town is the location of Karugutu Training School, an alpine warfare training school, owned, maintained and operated by the Uganda People's Defence Forces (UPDF).

At the end of the Second Congo War (1998-2003), Karugutu was inundated with Congolese refugees that followed the withdrawing UPDF troops. Also located in Karugutu are;

- Head Quatters of Tooro-Semliki Wildlife Reserve.
- Head Quatters of the North Rwenzori Forest Reserve.
- Now in Nombe Subcounty, the point where the Kicwamba escarpment meets the North Rwenzori Range
- etc.

== Population ==
In 2012, the population of Karugutu Municipality was estimated at approximately 16,000 people, in about 1,200 households. The town is divided into several administrative wards, including (a) Karugutu Ward (b) Ibanda Ward (c) Nyabuhuru Ward and (d) Kabasingagizi Ward.

== See also ==
- Bundibugyo
- Fort Portal
- Semliki Wildlife Reserve
- Semliki National Park
