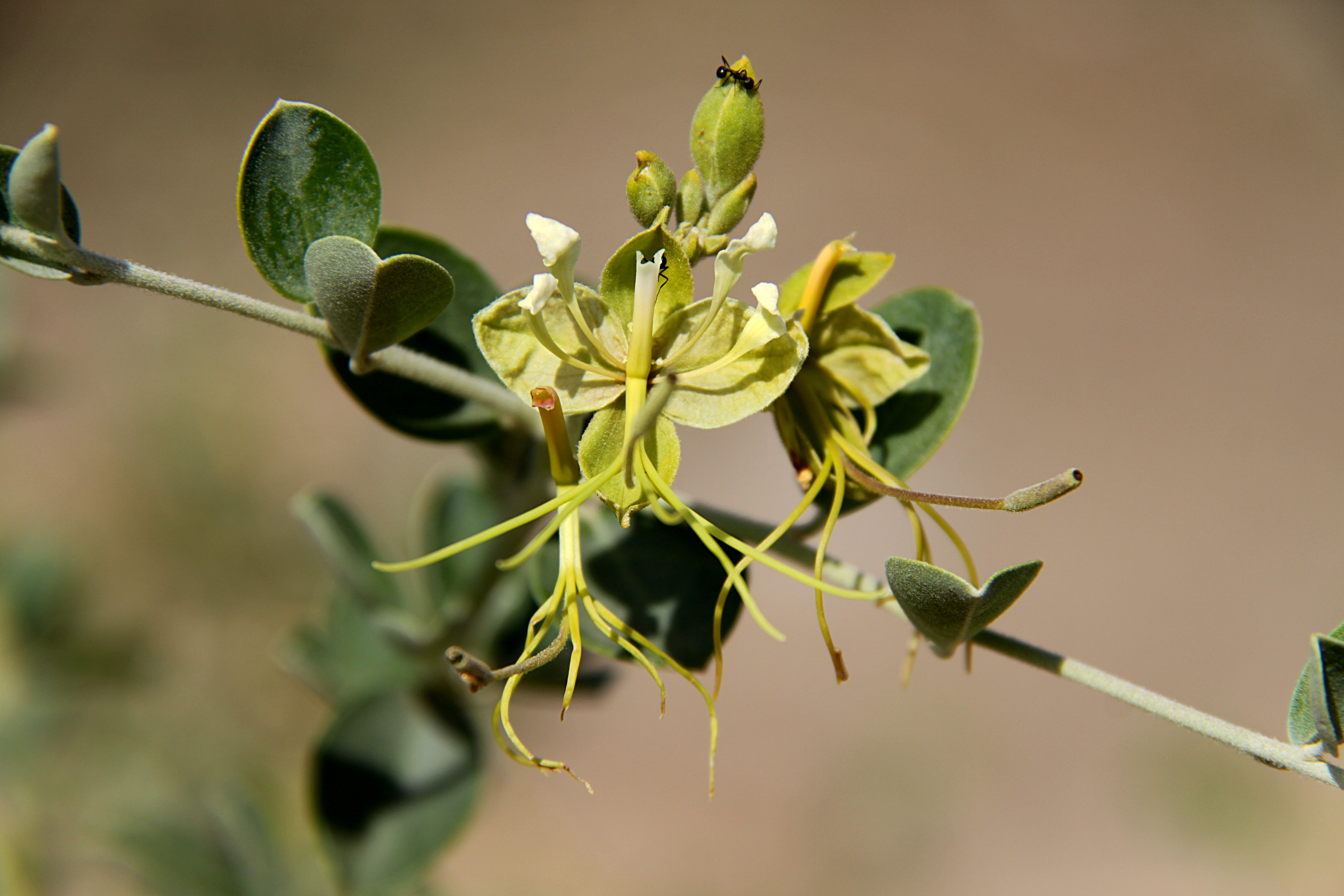

Scientific classification
- Kingdom: Plantae
- Clade: Embryophytes
- Clade: Tracheophytes
- Clade: Angiosperms
- Clade: Eudicots
- Clade: Rosids
- Order: Brassicales
- Family: Capparaceae
- Genus: Cadaba
- Species: C. farinosa

Binomial name
- Cadaba farinosa Forssk.

Subspecies
- subsp. farinosa; subsp. adenotricha = C. adenotricha, C. apiculata

Synonyms
- Stroemia farinosa; C. dubia; C. heterotricha var. glabrata; C. mombassana

= Cadaba farinosa =

Species of flowering plant

Cadaba farinosa is a 2–8 m (6.6–26.2 ft) high evergreen shrub or small tree that belongs to the caper family. It has simple ovate leaves with entire margins, zygomorphic, spidery, greenish, yellowish, whitish or pinkish flowers, and is covered in powdery hairs or scales, particularly the younger parts. It can be found in a zone from Senegal to India between the desert and the savanna.

== Description ==
Cadaba farinosa is a usually much branched shrub, mostly 2–3 m (7–10 ft) high, but under favorable circumstances a shrub of 5 m (16 ft) or a tree up to 8 m (26 ft). It has a smooth, reddish brown bark, while young branches appear powdery due to scales or short spreading hairs. The simple and entire leaves are alternate set along the branches, and have narrow, persistent stipules of up to 1½ mm (0.06 in) long, at both sides of an up to 3 mm (0.12 in) long leaf stalk, which carries an oblong or elliptical leaf blade of 5–50 mm (0.20–1.97 in) long and 3–30 mm (0.12–1.18 in) wide, rounded or pointed with a short stiff tip. When young, the leaves appear powdery, but they become gradually hairless. The central vein that branches feather-like into four to five pairs of side veins. The bilaterally symmetric flowers are arranged individually or with a few together in small inflorescences at the tip of the side branches. The flowers have both stamens and a pistel. Each sits on a 5–15 mm (0.20–0.59 in) long flower stalk, has four, somewhat unequal, elliptical sepals that fall after flowering. The outer sepals are 5–14 mm (0.20–0.55 in) long, concave particularly near the tip, that appears pointed because the margins are folded against each other. The inner sepals are almost flat and have a stump tip. The four petals, which fall earlier than the sepals, are approximately 12 mm (0.47 in) long, and consist of a linear, up-curved claw of 6–7 mm (0.24–0.28 in) long, that gradually passes into a wider, creamy, yellowish or dirty pink colored, oblanceolate 4–5 mm (0.16–0.20 in) long blade. The base of the (four or) five stamens and the pistol have merged into a horizontally oriented 4–5 mm long androgynophore, with the free upper parts of the filaments 1–2 cm (0.39–0.79 in) long and carrying 3½ mm (0.14 in) long, very quickly falling anthers. At the base of the androgynophore, there is at a right angle an upwardly directed tube-shaped appendage of 6–7 mm (0.24–0.28 in) long, colored like the petals. The ovary, that contains one cavity, sits on a stalk on top of the androgynophore (called gynophore) and has a cylinder shape. After ferilisation, this develops into a powdery cylindrical capsule of 2–4 cm (0.79–1.57 in) long and about 3 mm (0.12 in) in diameter, with many seeds and slight constricted between these, which open with two valves from the base when ripe. Individual seeds are 2½–3 mm (0.10–0.12 in), rounded to kidney-shaped, and are embedded in an orange-red pulp. The number of chromosomes is thirty two (2n=32).

=== Phytochemistry ===
C. farinosa contains aliphatic alcohols, glycosides, heteroside, nitrogenous bases, saponins, steroids and sterols, while particularly the leaves contain alkaloids.

== Taxonomy ==
Based on a type from Yemen, this species was first described by Peter Forsskål, an early Swedish explorer, orientalist and naturalist, in his Flora Aegyptiaco-Arabica, that was published in 1775, and named Cadaba farinosa. The Swiss botanist Augustin Pyramus de Candolle described a slightly different specimen in his Prodromus Systematis Naturalis Regni Vegetabilis as C. dubia in 1824. In 1854, Ukrainian botanist Nikolai Turczaninow described C. miqueliana. Ernest Friedrich Gilg and his wife Charlotte Gilg-Benedict distinguished in 1915 C. mombassana. All of these are now considered synonyms. C. adenotricha and C. apiculata were also distinguished by Gilg and Gilg-Benedict in 1915, based on the presence of glandular hairs, but they were synonymised and demoted to the subspecies adenotricha in 1963 by R.A. Graham.

=== Etymology ===
The genus name Cadaba is derived from the Arab word "kadhab", a local name for Cadaba rotundifolia. The species epithet is a contraction of the Latin words farīna meaning "flour" or "meal”, and -ōsos, a deflection meaning "full off".

== Distribution, habitat and ecology ==
This plant can be found in the Sahel and northern Sudanian Savanna between Mauritania and Senegal in the West, along the Red Sea, through the Arabian Peninsula, and the coast of the Indian Ocean all the way to India in the East. It is widespread in Africa, and may grow up to an altitude of 1,600 m (5,200 ft). It is often found on termite mounds and grows together with Maerua species. This species grows in areas with a mean annual precipitation between 200 mm (7.9 in) and 500 mm (20 in), and a temperature of approximately 29 °C (84 °F), and prefers heavy soils, although it also grows on stony scree and sand. The foliage is eaten by black rhinos, buffalos and hartebeests. Butterflies of the genus Colotis feed on the leaves of Capparaceae, including those of Cadaba farinosa.

== Uses ==
The wood of the plant is used for fuel. The leaves and young twigs of Cadaba farinosa are edible. In western Africa, leaves are squashed, boiled and eaten as a gruel, sometimes mixed with couscous. In northern Nigeria pounded leaves are mixed with cereals and dried to make irregularly shaped chocolate-brown cake, which is sold on markets called farsa, balambo, baleno, tsawa (in Hausa), or tigiraganda. Macerated flowers are added to dough to make it sweeter. It is used as fodder by different types of husbandry and is one of the species preferred by camels in the North of Kenya. Leaves are reported to contain 15.2–18.2% crude protein, about 60-80% fibre and 7-8% ash. It is also particularly relished by goats which browse its leaves year-round. In traditional medicine in different parts of Africa and India, several parts of the plant are reported to be used, against infections such as of the skin and the intestines, food-poisoning, anthrax, dysenteria, intestinal worms, and against pain such as rheumatism.
