= Wilson Tumwine =

Ugandan politician and businessman

- Born: Wilson Tumwine; Mbarara District, Uganda
- Occupations: politician, businessman
- Known for: Politics, Community work

Wilson Tumwine is a Ugandan Politician and businessman. He is the former Mbarara City Mayor, and the owner of Pelikan Hotel. He was among the list of politicians who had allegedly grabbed government land.

Career and Business

Politically he served as a chairman for the National Resistance Movement in Mbarara. He also served as Mbarara since 2002-2016.

He owns a hotel business in commonly known as Pelikan Hotel.

He is also a former Vice President of the Federation of Uganda's Football Association.

Controversy

He was accused of degazzeting of land and receiving excessive compassion from the Uganda National Roads Authority.
