= Kijura =

- Map of Uganda showing location of Kijura
- Coordinates: 00°49′01″N 30°25′03″E
- Country: Uganda
- Region: Western Region of Uganda
- Sub-region: Toro sub-region
- Districts: Kabarole District
- Elevation: 1,500 m (4,900 ft)
- Time zone: UTC+3 (EAT)

Kijura is a town in Kabarole District, in the Western Region of Uganda.

== Location ==
The town is in Hakibaale Sub-county, being one of the eight parishes in that administrative unit. Kijura is approximately 30 kilometres (19 mi), by road, northeast of Fort Portal, the largest town in the Toro sub-region. This is approximately 292 kilometres (181 mi) west of Kampala, the capital and largest city of Uganda. The coordinates of the Kijura are 0°49'01.0"N 30°25'03.0"E (Latitude:0.816944; Longitude:30.417500).

== Overview ==
The town is the location of the burial place of Brigadier Noble Mayombo, R.I.P.
