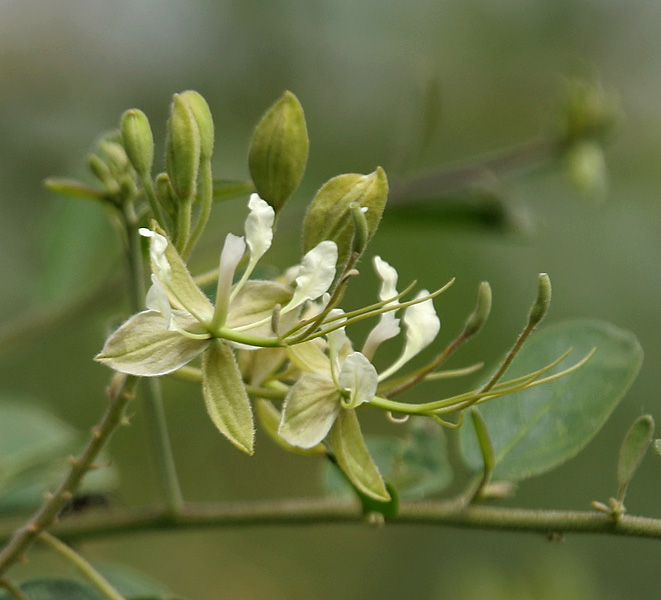
- Cadaba fruticosa

Scientific classification
- Kingdom: Plantae
- Clade: Embryophytes
- Clade: Tracheophytes
- Clade: Angiosperms
- Clade: Eudicots
- Clade: Rosids
- Order: Brassicales
- Family: Capparaceae
- Genus: Cadaba; Forssk.

Species
- 29, see text

Synonyms
- Desmocarpus Wall. (1832), not validly publ.; Macromerum Burch. (1822); Mozambe Raf. (1838); Schepperia Neck. ex DC. (1824); Stroemia Vahl (1790)

= Cadaba =

Genus of flowering plants

Cadaba is a genus of shrubs in family Capparaceae, with about 30 species. These have simple, alternately set leaves. The zygomorphic flowers, are solitary or stand in small clusters at the end of short side branches. These flowers consist of four sepals, none or four petals with a narrow claw at base and a wider plate at the top, a tube-shaped nectar producing appendix, four or five stamens that are merged for about half their length into a so-called androgynophore, and a gynophore on top of which will develop a cylindrical capsule with one or two cavities that contain many small kindney-shaped seeds, and opens with two valves. The genus name Cadaba is derived from the Arab word "kadhab", a local name for Cadaba rotundifolia. Some species are classified as famine food in southern Ethiopia.

29 species are accepted:

- Cadaba aphylla (Thunb.) Wild
- Cadaba baccarinii Chiov.
- Cadaba barbigera Gilg
- Cadaba benguellensis Mendes
- Cadaba capparoides DC.
- Cadaba carneoviridis Gilg & Gilg-Ben.
- Cadaba divaricata Gilg
- Cadaba farinosa Forrsk.
- Cadaba fruticosa (L.) Druce
- Cadaba gillettii R.A.Graham
- Cadaba glaberrima Gilg & Gilg-Ben.
- Cadaba glandulosa Forrsk.
- Cadaba insularis A.G.Mill.
- Cadaba kassasii Chrtek
- Cadaba kirkii Oliv.
- Cadaba linearifolia (J.Graham) M.R.Almeida
- Cadaba longifolia DC.
- Cadaba madagascariensis Baill.
- Cadaba mirabilis Gilg
- Cadaba natalensis Sond.
- Cadaba parvula Polhill
- Cadaba rotundifolia Forssk.
- Cadaba ruspolii Gilg
- Cadaba schroeppelii Suess.
- Cadaba somalensis Franch.
- Cadaba stenopoda Gilg & Gilg-Ben.
- Cadaba termitaria N.E.Br.
- Cadaba trifoliata (Roxb.) Wight & Arn.
- Cadaba virgata Bojer
