= Ntoroko District =

- District
- District location in Uganda
- Coordinates: 01°06′N 30°24′E
- Country: Uganda
- Region: Western Region
- Sub-region: Rwenzori sub-region
- Capital: Kibuuku Town Council

Area
  - Total: 1,236 km^{2} (477 sq mi)
- Elevation: 640 m (2,100 ft)

Population (2014 Census)
  - Total: 67,005
  - Density: 57.35/km^{2} (148.5/sq mi)
- Time zone: UTC+3 (EAT)
- Website: www.ntoroko.go.ug

Ntoroko District is a district in the Western Region of Uganda. The district headquarters are in the Kibbuuku town council. It is the second least populated district in Uganda.

== Location ==
Ntoroko District is one of the two Ugandan districts west of the Rwenzori Mountains, the other being Bundibugyo District. The Ntoroko District is bordered by the Democratic Republic of the Congo to the west and north, separated by the winding Semuliki River, has a maritime boundary with two Bunyoro districts; Kikuube District to the north-north-east and Kagadi District to the north-east. Kabarole District to the south and east, and Bundibugyo District to the south. The town of Ntoroko (officially Kanara Town Council is approximately 84 km north-west of Fort Portal City, the regional capital by road, 111 from Bundibugyo and approximately 162 km by road, north-east of Kasese, the other larger towns in the Rwenzori sub-region This location is approximately 376 kilometres (234 mi), by road, west of Kampala, the capital and largest city of Uganda.

== Overview ==
The Ntoroko District was created by the Ugandan Parliament and became operational on 1 July 2010. Before that, the district was part of the Bundibugyo District.

== Population ==
In 1991, the national population census estimated the district population at 24,300. The national census in 2002 estimated the population at 51,100. In 2014, the national census and household survey enumerated the district population at 67,005.

== See also ==
- Districts of Uganda
- Rwenzori sub-region
