= Kyebambe III =

Kyebambe III is the name of:

== Ugandan rulers ==
- Nyamutukura Kyebambe III of Bunyoro (died 1835), ruled Bunyoro (part of modern-day Uganda) from 1786 to 1835
- Rububi Kyebambe III of Toro (fl. 1870s), ruler of Toro Kingdom
