= Nyaika of Tooro =

King of Tooro (fl. 1860s–1870s)

Rukirabasaija Kasunga Kyebambe Nyaika was Omukama of the Kingdom of Tooro, from 1862 to 1863, and 1864 to c. 1874. He was the third Omukama (King) of Tooro.

== Claim to the throne ==
He was the fourth (4th) son of Rukirabasaija Kaboyo Omuhundwa Kasusunkwanzi Olimi I, the first Omukama of Tooro, who reigned between 1830 and 1861. There is no mention of who his mother was. He killed his elder brother Rukirabasaija Kazana Ruhaga, in 1862, and ascended the throne by force.

== Offspring ==
Omukama Nyaika is said to have fathered fourteen (14) sons, including the following.

1. Rukirabasaija Nyaika Mukabirere Olimi II, Omukama of Toro, who reigned between 1874 and 1876.
2. Prince (Omubiito) Mukarusa. He rebelled against his brother Nyaika Olimi II and seized Busongora in 1872. He was proclaimed Omukama under the title of Rukirabasaija Mukarusa Kyebambe II. He was defeated and killed in 1875, by the Bunyoro Army commanded by Chief Kikukule of Bugangaizi.
3. Rukirabasaija Isingoma Rukidi II, Omukama of Toro, who reigned in 1875.
4. Rukirabasaija Rubuubi Kyebambe II, Omukama of Toro, who reigned in 1875 and between 1877 and 1879.
5. Rukirabasaija Kakende Nyamuyonjo, Omukama of Toro, who reigned from 1875 until 1876 and from 1879 until 1880.
6. Rukirabasaija Katera, Omukama of Toro, who reigned between 1876 and 1877.
7. Rukirabasaija Kyebambe III, Omukama of Toro, who reigned from 1891 until 1928

== His reign ==
He was forced to flee when the Kingdom of Toro was invaded by an army from Buganda, in support of Kato Rukidi I, who rebelled against his uncle (Nyaika), briefly seized the throne and declared himself Omukama. After a few months, Kato Rukidi I was overthrown by his subjects and Omukama Nyaika returned to the throne.

== The final years ==
Omukama Nyaika died sometime between 1872 and 1875, possibly of smallpox.

== See also ==
- Omukama of Tooro
- Macwa of Nkore
- Rububi Kyebambe II of Tooro

Preceded by Kazana Ruhaga	Omukama of Tooro; 1866–1871	Succeeded by Kato Rukidi I

Preceded by Kato Rukidi I	Omukama of Tooro; 1871–1872	Succeeded by Nyaika Olimi II
