= Akiki =

Akiki is a surname. Notable people with the surname include:

- Dale Akiki (born 1957), American falsely accused church volunteer
- Fadi Akiki, Lebanese military judge
- Ramy Akiki (born 1982), Lebanese basketball player

== See also ==
- Akiki Nyabongo (c. 1907–1975), Ugandan political activist and author
