= Omuhikirwa of Tooro =

- Coat of arms of Tooro

- Flag of Tooro
- Incumbent; Calvin Armstrong Rwomiire Akiiki since 14 February 2025
- Style: The Right Honourable
- Appointer: The Omukama
- Term length: At His Majesty's pleasure
- Inaugural holder: Yaheti Byakuyamba
- Formation: 1891
- Deputy: Basaliza Henry Mutegeki; Harriet Nyakake Abwooli

The Omuhikirwa is the prime minister of the Kingdom of Tooro, one of the traditional kingdoms within Uganda. The Omuhikirwa is subordinate to and appointed by the monarch of Tooro, the Omukama. The Omuhikirwa chair's the Tooro cabinet of ministers, exercises the day-to-day governance of the kingdom, and acts as a spokesman for the Omukama. As head of government, the Omuhikirwa is an ex-offico member of the Orukurato Orukuru, the kingdom's parliament.

The earliest record of a Prime Minister of Tooro dates back to 1891. The office was then styled as Kattikiro. Upon Uganda's independence in 1962, the Ugandan constitution restyled the office as Omuhikirwa.

The current Omuhikirwa is Calvin Armstrong Rwomiire Akiiki, who was appointed by King Rukidi IV on 14 February 2025.

== List of Omuhikirwa ==
- 1891–1894: Yaheti Byakuyamba
- 1894–1898: Yoswa Rusoke
- 1898–1914: Nasanari Mugurusi
- 1914–1923: Mikairi Rusoke
- 1923–1924: Nasanairi Mayanja
- 1924–1926: Rauli Kiwanuka
- 1926-1934: Yosia Sewali
- 1934–1941: Yosam Mbaijama
- 1941–1946: Marko Kaboha
- 1946–1958: Hosea Nkojo
- 1958–1967: Samson Ruburwa Rusoke
- 1967–1993: Post abolished
- 1993–2000: John Sanyu Katuramu
- 2000–2001: Zaverio Byabagambi
- 2001–2006: Stephen Nyabongo Rwakijuma
- 2006–2008: Steven Irumba
- 2008–2010: William Nyakatura
- 2010–2011: Apollo Karugaba
- 2011–2023: Amos Mugisa
- 2013–2025: Steven Kaliba
- 2015–2022: Benard Tungakwo
- 2022–2025: Steven Kiyingi
- 2025–present: Calvin Armstrong Rwomiire Akiiki
