= Rukidi II of Tooro =

Omukama of Tooro

Rukirabasaija Isingoma Rukidi II was Omukama of the Tooro Kingdom for a few months in 1875. Tooro was among the traditional kingdoms located within the borders of modern-day Uganda. He was the sixth Omukama of Tooro.

== Claim to the throne ==
He was the third son of Kasunga Kyebambe Nyaika, Omukama of Tooro from 1866 until 1872, except for a brief period in 1871. His mother was Omugo Kabuleta. He ascended to the throne following the capture of his brother, Rukirabasaija Nyaika Mukabirere Olimi II, the fifth (5th) Omukama of Tooro, by the Bunyoro Army in 1875.

== Married life ==
No mention of his married life is made in the available literature.

== Offspring ==
The number of his children is unknown. He was survived by a son, Samwiri Nyamugabwa Kwitakurumuki who later became the chief of Kibale.

== His reign ==
Omukama Rukidi II was not able to hold on to the throne for very long. He abdicated after a few months in favor of his younger brother, Kakende Nyamuyonjo.

== The final years ==
It is not known where and how Omukama Rukidi II died or what the cause of death was.

== Succession table ==
Preceded by Nyaika Mukabirere Olimi II	Omukama of Tooro; 1875–1875	Succeeded by Rububi Kyebambe

== See also ==
- Omukama of Tooro
- Rukidi I of Tooro
- Rukidi III of Tooro
- Tooro kingdom.
