= James Herman Robinson =

American activist

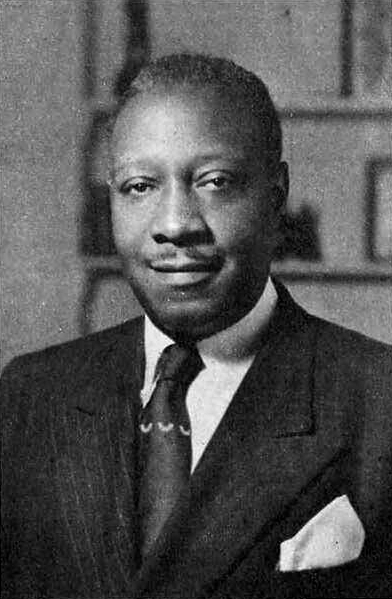
- Robinson c. 1953
- Born: January 24, 1907; Knoxville, Tennessee, US
- Died: November 6, 1972 (aged 65); New York City
- Education: Lincoln University; Union Theological Seminary
- Occupations: Clergyman, humanitarian
- Spouse(s): Helen Brodie (1938-1954, divorce); Gertrude Thomas (1957-1972, his death)
- Parent(s): Henry and Willie Belle Robinson

James Herman Robinson (January 24, 1907 – November 6, 1972) was an African-American clergyman and humanitarian, best known as the founder of Operation Crossroads Africa (OCA), a cross-cultural exchange program considered a forerunner of the Peace Corps. Robinson served on the Corps' first National Advisory Council, and advised the U.S. State Department on African affairs. He also organized Harlem's Morningside Community Center, cofounded the African Academy of Arts and Research, and advocated independence for African nations.

== Life ==
=== Childhood and education ===
Robinson was born in Knoxville, Tennessee, one of six children of Henry and Willie Belle Robinson. He spent his early childhood in "The Bottoms," a polluted slum that lay along First Creek in downtown Knoxville. Disenchanted by racism and poverty, Robinson joined a gang that skulked about the intersection of Vine and Central, in what is now the Old City. He found inspiration in his grandfather, a former slave who had fought for the Union during the Civil War, and a charismatic Baptist minister named Jim Haywood.

When Robinson was about 10, his family moved to Cleveland to find work in the city's war-time era factories. Following his mother's death, he lived with his grandparents for a brief period in Youngstown, Ohio, before returning to Cleveland during the recession that followed World War I. In spite of his family's opposition to education, Robinson managed to finish high school and enroll in Western Reserve University. He completed two semesters before the Reverend C. Lee Jefferson of the St. Mark's Presbyterian Church offered to pay for him to train as a minister if he joined the Presbyterian Church.

Robinson enrolled in Lincoln University in Oxford, Pennsylvania, in 1931. During the summer of 1933, while staying with his aunt in Knoxville, he was tasked with overseeing a small black congregation in Bearden, then a rural community on the outskirts of the city. He encouraged his congregation to vote and become more politically active, agitating Bearden's white residents, and was eventually chased out of the community by a lynch mob.

Robinson graduated as the valedictorian of his class from Lincoln in 1935, and enrolled in Union Theological Seminary in New York. He was President of the 1937–1938 class at Union, with the Rev. Ralph M. Carmichael as his vice president. Both men would dedicate their lives to social justice. At Union, former American Civil Liberties Union chairman Harry F. Ward, a professor at the school, had a tremendous impact on Robinson, especially with his ideas regarding Social Christianity.

=== Humanitarianism ===
Following his graduation and ordination in 1938, Robinson became pastor of Harlem's Morningside Presbyterian Church, which was renamed the Church of the Master shortly afterward. That same year, he established the Morningside Community Center, and set up a cooperative store and a credit union for the local community. In 1942, Robinson established an integrated summer camp, Rabbit Hollow, on donated land in New Hampshire. He co-founded the African Academy of Arts and Research the following year.

In 1951, the Presbyterian Board of Foreign Missions sent Robinson on a tour of Europe, the Middle East, and Asia to visit missionaries and to determine potential support for the church in those parts of the world. He made a similar tour of Africa in 1954, and suggested the church focus on practical aid for the continent, namely by sending doctors, engineers and other professionals, rather than missionaries. He discussed his travels and his plans to provide aid for Africa at the Lyman Beecher Lectures at Yale in 1955, and gained the support of noted individuals such as William O. Douglas and Theodore Hesburgh, as well as African leaders such as Nnamdi Azikiwe, Akiki Nyabongo, and Kingsley Mbadiwe.

Robinson's efforts coalesced in 1958 with the establishment of Operation Crossroads Africa, which aimed to provide volunteer opportunities for students and professionals to help build infrastructure and improve education in impoverished African communities. The OCA built water systems, schools, clinics, and orphanages for villages, and established teacher training programs that within a few years had trained thousands of teachers. By the 1970s, over 4,000 students had served in the OCA.

During the Cold War, as the United States and the Soviet Union fought one another for influence around the world, the U.S. government became concerned over the spread of communism in African nations, and sought Robinson's advice on how to deal with burgeoning African governments. Robinson warned U.S. officials not to blindly support European colonial powers over African nationalist movements, and stated that communism was a not serious threat among the African people. Robinson was eventually appointed to the State Department's Advisory Council on African Affairs.

Upon the establishment of the Peace Corps in 1961, President John F. Kennedy and Sargent Shriver, recognizing Robinson's work with OCA, sought his advice on organizing aid efforts in developing nations. Kennedy later described the OCA as the "progenitor" of the Peace Corps. Robinson served as a vice chairman of the Corps' National Advisory Council.

On May 5, 1964, Robinson appeared before the House Committee on Un-American Activities to refute suspicions that he harbored communist sympathies. These suspicions arose primarily from Robinson's associations with certain communists in the 1940s, as well as comments he made in his 1954 book, Tomorrow Is Today. Robinson denied ever being a communist, though he stated that before World War II, he had knowingly worked with communists who supported causes (such as civil rights) that he supported.

Robinson was appointed special representative to Bechuanaland (modern Botswana) and Basutoland (modern Lesotho) by President Lyndon Johnson in 1965, and later organized cross-cultural efforts in the Caribbean and South America. He died at St. Luke's Hospital in New York on November 6, 1972.

== Support of President Kennedy's Civil Rights Project ==
In his commencement speech at Dartmouth College in 1963, Dr. Robinson presented the speech titled:

The Second Emancipation: The Future Belongs Only to the Free

In this speech, he described President Kennedy as one who has "taken a more forthright, open and courageous stand on the right side of the racial question, than any other president".

== Bibliography ==
- Road Without Turning (1950)
- Tomorrow Is Today (1954)
- Adventurous Preaching (1955)
- Africa At the Crossroads (1962)

== See also ==
- Charles W. Cansler
- William F. Yardley
