= Orukurato Orukuru (Tooro) =

Parliament of the Kingdom of Tooro

Supreme Council of Tooro Orukurato Orukuru
- Coat of arms of Tooro

Type
- Type: Unicameral

Leadership
- Speaker: Julius Mwirumubie

Structure
- Seats: 120
- Political groups: His Majesty's Government (13): Omuhikirwa and Ministers (13); Territorial representatives (100): Elected members (80); Chiefs (20); Social representatives (7): Civil society (7); Presiding Officer: Speaker (1)

Elections
- Voting system: Election and Appointment by the Omukama

Meeting place
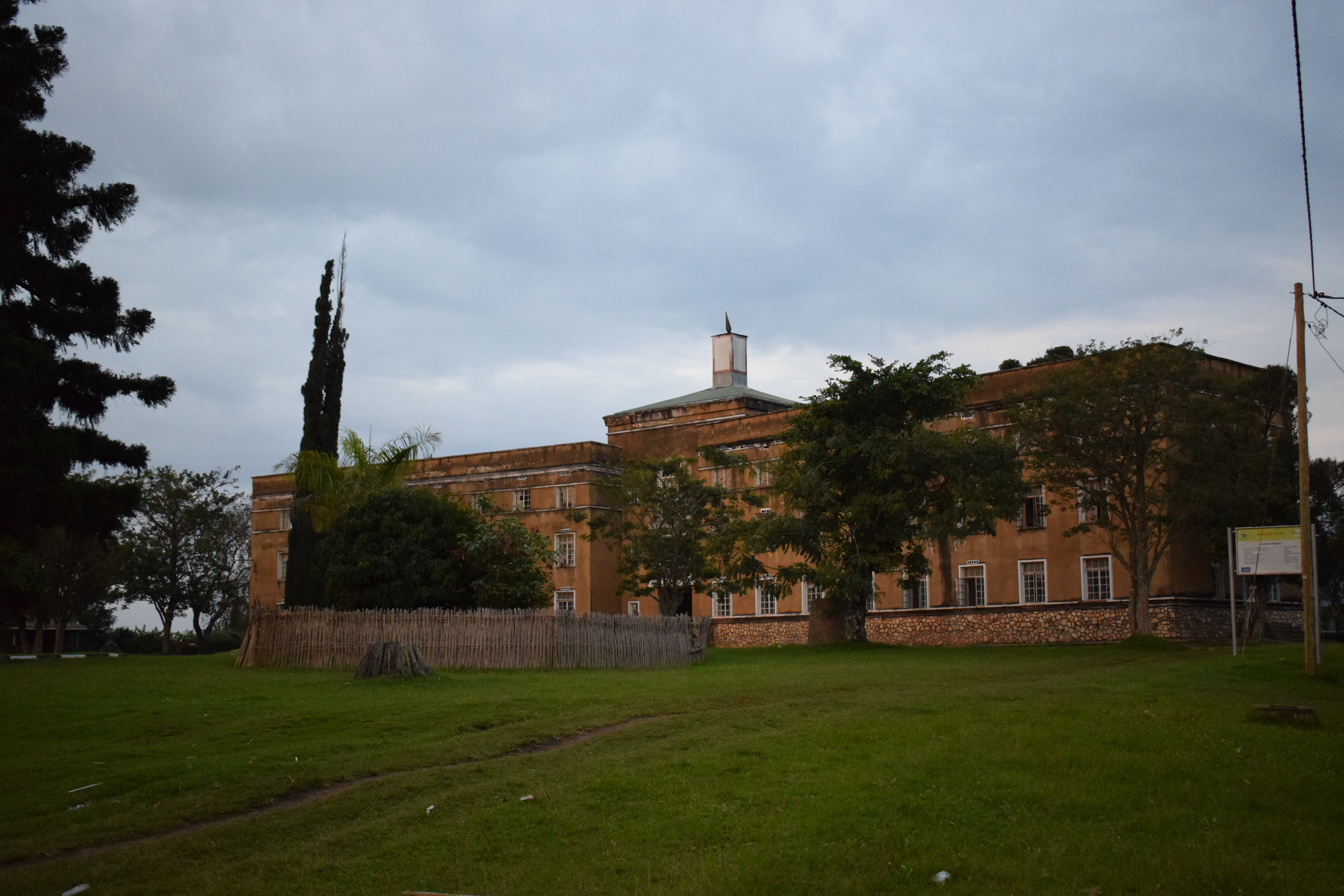
- Rukurato Chambers, Parliament House; Fort Portal, Uganda

The Orukurato Orukuru (often called the Supreme Council or simply the Rukurato) is the Parliament of the Kingdom of Tooro.

The Rukurato is today convened at Parliament House in Fort Portal. The membership consists of 80 directly-elected members representing the clans of Tooro, 20 chiefs, the Omuhikirwa and other cabinet ministers, as well as representatives of civil society. The body is chaired by the speaker, currently Julius Mwirumubie. The Rukurato is charged with legislating by-laws of the kingdom and scrutinising the kingdom's government, but is not allowed by the state government to legislate on political matters. The Rukurato is also charged with formally confirming the selection of a new Omukama by the Royal family.
