= Akiki Nyabongo =

Ugandan political activist and author (c. 1907–1975)

Akiki Hosea Kanyarusoke Nyabongo
- Born: 1907; Fort Portal (Kabarole), Western Region, Uganda
- Died: October 2, 1975 (aged 67–68); Jinja, Eastern Region, Uganda
- Spouse: Ada Naomi Nyabongo
- Issue: Amoti Nyabongo
- Father: Kyebambe III
- Education: Howard University (BA); Harvard University (MA); Queen's College, The University of Oxford (DPhill, Anthropology, 1939)
- Alma mater: Yale
- Occupations: Author, anthropologist, and political activist

Akiki Hosea Kanyarusoke Nyabongo (c. 1907 – October 2, 1975) was a Ugandan political activist and author. He was born a prince of the Tooro Kingdom in West Uganda and received his university education in the United States and Britain. An Oxford-trained anthropologist, Nyabongo had teaching positions in the United States and continued anthropological research. He later returned to Uganda, contributing to its independence from Britain and lived there until his death.

Akiki Nyabongo collaborated with various pan-African activists (including W.E.B. Du Bois and George Padmore) and openly advocated for African decolonization and development in his writings. His most noted novel was Africa Answers Back (1936), one of the first English-language novels by a Ugandan author. This novel noticed a syncretizing political and cultural reality in colonial Africa symbolizing his faith in African unity. Nyabongo represented the West Ugandan (Tooro) people's will for political freedom and making their voices heard globally.

== Early life and education ==
Tooro Kingdom flag

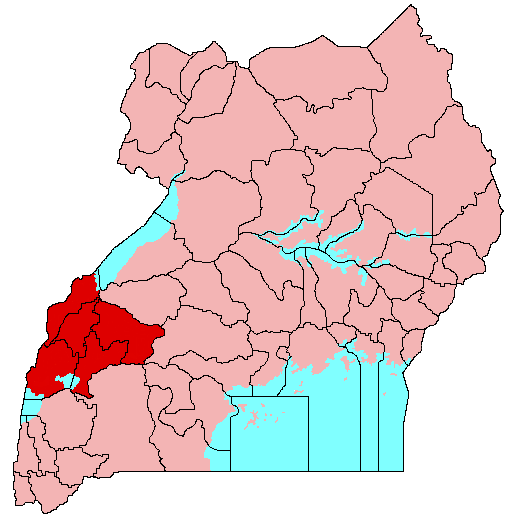
Map of Tooro Kingdom in Uganda

Akiki Nyabongo was a son of Kyembambe III, Omukama (King) of the Tooro Kingdom in Western Uganda. He was born in the Ugandan city of Fort Portal in 1907. The young prince completed his secondary education at King's College in Budo, East Africa. He pursued higher education at Howard University (BA) and Yale. He attended Harvard University for his master's degree and a PhD in anthropology at the Queen's College, The University of Oxford. In 1937, the Rhodes Trust started supporting his studies due to his high academic performance there. Nyabongo graduated in 1939 from Oxford with the thesis The Religious Practices and Beliefs of Ugandans. This study comprehensively analyzed Ugandan religion, beliefs, and oral traditions. It was praised as an example of 'autoethnography' with a highly non-replaceable academic value.

== Career ==
After completing his doctorate, contrary to the British colonial government's will to have him return to Uganda, he moved to live in Brooklyn, New York City, in 1940. Across the 1940s, he was a professor at the University of Alabama and later at North Carolina A&T University.

In 1957, he returned to Uganda to help negotiate independence from Britain. In 1959, Nyabongo fled Uganda out of security concerns. He began work as a professor of sociology and culture at the University of Leiden in the Hague, Netherlands. Before 1962, he worked on the constitution committee for Ugandan independence. Later, Nyabongo ran as an independent for a parliamentary position in Tooro South, a constituency near his hometown Fort Portal and lost. Nyabongo spent the rest of his career in Uganda, chairing the Ugandan government's Town and Country Planning Committee until he died in 1975.

== Political activism ==
=== Connection with activists ===
"Pan-African Flag" created by Universal Negro Improvement Association and African Communities League

Nyabongo lived a global life. He collaborated with prominent civil rights activists and shared the works he wrote in Uganda, the United States, and Western Europe. He lived and worked with George Padmore and cooperated with W. E. B. Du Bois for the latter's abortive project, Encyclopedia of the Negro. Nyabongo challenged colonialism and furthered conversations about Black internationalism through these publications, relationships, and correspondences. Nyabongo also introduced civil rights activist Eslanda Goode Robeson to Uganda during her trip to the African continent in 1936.

In 1936, while completing a thesis on Ugandan religious customs at Queen's College, Oxford, and a year after publishing his first novel The Story of an African Chief (re-titled Africa answers back), Nyabongo sent a letter to Rabindranath Tagore (1861–1941), a Bengali poet. The letter requested the translation of a morally charged poem that Tagore had composed about Africa to disseminate the text to all Africans. The poem protested Benito Mussolini's invasion of Ethiopia (then Abyssinia) and critiqued the organized violence by European imperial forces on the African continent. In Tagore's response to Nyabongo, he complied with Nyabongo's request. As a result of this correspondence, the British press The Spectator published "To Africa," the English version of the original poem translated by Tagore on May 7, 1937.

=== Political participation ===
In 1945, Akiki Nyabongo delegated at the Colonial Conference that Du Bois and the NAACP called in New York on April 6 at the 135th Street Branch of the New York Public Library. He was a resolutions committee member and helped outline four points that advocated anti-colonialism and the development of the African states. These points were sent to a variety of presses and finally presented at the San Francisco Conference.

Akiki Nyabongo was a significant member and contributor to the Universal Ethiopian Student's Association (UESA), formed by activist scholars from the United States, the Caribbeans, and Africa, in Harlem, New York, in 1927. In January 1947, Nyabongo served as the editor-in-chief for the UESA's essential publication: The African: The Journal of African Affairs. His editorship symbolized the entire Black intellectual community's attention to the tense political climate in Africa. Nyabongo contributed to this drifting attention by directing the periodical to concentrate on African politics. Moreover, by writing book reviews of noteworthy African activist scholarships recommended by the UESA, like W.E.B. Du Bois's Black Folk Then and Now, Nyabongo tried to advocate unity across the Black population. Both agendas echoed the journal's call for liberation, the end of imperialism, humanization for Africans in the diaspora, and the development of African states.

=== Political ideology ===
Akiki Nyabongo advocated for the unity of ethnicities and religions. Nyabongo had also been in contact with the members of the African Association and endorsed a united tribe, characterized by brotherhood with no "tribe against tribes" or "sects against sects". This ideology directly influenced many East African states with many ethnicities, including the British Uganda Protectorate and the Tooro Kingdom. Inspired by Dr. James Aggrey and his educational philosophy on unity and inclusivity of the entire African continent, Akiki Nyabongo further emphasized that there should be no religious quarrels among Africans and one's religious beliefs must be respected. He pushed for religious inclusivity in his political agenda. For Nyabongo, religious inclusivity was a vital way to promote the general well-being of the whole continent. The erased distinction between backgrounds created a shared African identity, supporting a pan-African political awakening.

== Writings and research ==
Akiki Nyabongo was an active author and editor. He was one of the first Ugandan authors to publish an English-language novel, and was the editor-in-chief of The African Magazine. His most well known work is the novel Story of an African Chief, published in 1935, which in 1936 was reissued under the title Africa Answers Back.

This semi-autobiographical novel is set in Buganda and follows the life story of Abala Stanley Mujungu: son of a Bugandan chief who ascends the throne. The main character struggles with his identity throughout his life, trying to balance the indigenous values instilled by his parents and the influences of Christianity and western culture from the local missionaries. African and European knowledge systems repeatedly clash in conflict throughout the book. In one scene, the main character, Mujungu, recently appointed chief, requests a local healer to treat a fractured man's arm after seeing the English doctor has bandaged it. A German doctor expresses surprise, unable to fathom an alternate medical procedure without using bandages. The German and British doctors ask to sit in and learn how the local healer will operate, using the experience as a learning opportunity. This scene exemplifies the legitimacy of African knowledge systems of medicine compared to western medicine; a theme Nyabongo continues throughout the novel.

=== Religious syncretism in Africa Answers Back ===
Religious syncretism, the incorporation of two unrelated religious practices (e.g., rituals) into one coherent system, was a significant theme evident throughout Africa Answers Back in describing the merging of Christian and African religious systems in Uganda. This theory is symbolized early in the novel when the chief names his son, the novel's main character Abala Stanley Mujungu. "Abala" was a traditional Ugandan name, whereas Stanley stemmed from the chief's fondness for a Christian missionary named Stanley.

=== Reception of Africa Answers Back ===
Africa Answers Back is one of the first English novels with an African-informed perspective on colonial narratives. The novel is considered a "foundational text of postcolonial African literature" by critiquing the then cultural and racial stereotypes circulating academia and society.

Despite praise from the literary world, Nyabongo encounters criticism for this novel. Literary scholar Martina Kopf claimed that Nyabongo took an approach similar to the colonial institutions he criticized. She focused on the medical scene, where the injured man was not included in the conversation about his medical treatment. Instead, the chief took a top-down approach, using assumptions and biases to inform his decision-making on behalf of his villagers, similar to the arbitrary decision-making of colonial institutions. Moreover, Nyabongo's use of 'savage' throughout the novel left scholars like Mahruba T. Mowtushi questioning the negative connotations of locals in contrast to the 'civilized' society.

The scholar Danson Sylvester Kahyana provided a comprehensive review of the novel. He focused on the medical scene and argued that Akiki Nyabongo's advocacy of introducing Western medicine showcased his particular belief in the Western culture's positive impacts on African living standards. Yet, the anti-colonial novelist primarily sees Western education as a challenge to the survival of African norms, customs, and beliefs operating for centuries.

=== Other projects ===
Nyabongo published a few folktale collections in the 1930s. In 1937, he published Bisoro Stories (1937), succeeded by Bisoro Stories II (1939). Winds and Lights: African Fairy Tales was published in 1939.

Nyabongo also produced an unpublished manuscript, Yali the Savage, which intended to introduce the American actor, singer and activist Paul Robeson. This draft is now preserved at the Queen's College's "The Nyabongo Papers" archival collection. The author's last known project published was a Rutooro-language book, Oruhenda, which described the Tooro region's culture, tradition, and arcane palace language.

As an Oxford-trained anthropologist, Nyabongo once researched Ebito, the ancient Ugandan language based on flowers. In this study, he disregarded his identity as a pan-African political activist but meant to suggest the mobility and interconnectedness of ancient Uganda via overlapping cultural practices. However, Nyabongo failed to complete this research. The project lacked funding. More importantly, the Tooro Kingdom asked him to go back to Uganda to help negotiate independence from Britain.

== Death ==
Akiki Nyabongo died at Jinja Hospital in Uganda on October 2, 1975, at the age of 65.

He was survived by his wife, Ada Naomi Nyabongo, and his son, Amoti Nyabongo.

== Selected works ==
- Story of an African Chief (1935), reissued and renamed Africa Answers Back (1936);
- Bisoro I (1937);
- Bisoro II (1939);
- Winds and Lights: African Fairy Tales (1939).

== Archival materials ==
"The Nyabongo Papers" is a Queen's College archival collection of Akiki Nyabongo's lectures, writing drafts, published works, and photographs relevant to him. The college selected some of its collections for a small exhibition in October 2021 to commemorate Black History Month.
