= Katera of Tooro =

King of Tooro from 1876 to 1877

Katera

Omukama of Tooro
- Reign: 1876–1877
- Predecessor: Kakende Nyamuyonjo
- Successor: Rububi Kyebambe II
- Born: Unknown; Tooro Kingdom
- Died: Unknown; Unknown
- House: Biito-boyo
- Father: Kasunga Kyebambe Nyaika
- Mother: Unknown

Rukirabasaija Katera was Omukama Omukama of the Tooro Kingdom, from 1876 until 1877. He was the ninth Omukama of Tooro.

== Claim to the throne ==
He was the sixth (6th) son of Kasunga Kyebambe Nyaika, Omukama of Tooro, from 1866 until 1871 and from 1871 until 1872. No mention is made of his mother. He was raised to the throne by the Tooro people, when his elder brother Kakende Nyamuyonjo failed to return from Buganda in 1876.

Katera’s brief rule was characterized by efforts to stabilize the kingdom amidst external threats, particularly from Bunyoro, which sought to reassert control over Tooro.

== See also ==
- Omukama of Tooro
- Olimi III of Tooro
- Olimi I of Tooro
- Olimi II of Tooro

Preceded by Kakende Nyamuyonjo	Omukama of Tooro; 1876–1877	Succeeded by Rububi Kyebambe
