= Olimi I of Tooro =

King of Tooro (fl. 1820s–1860s)

Rukirabasaija Kaboyo Omuhundwa Kasusunkwanzi Olimi I was the founder and first Omukama (King) of the Tooro Kingdom one of the traditional monarchies in what is now Western Uganda from around 1830 until around 1861.

== Early life and claim to the throne ==
He was the eldest son of Rukirabasaija Agutamba Nyamutukura Kyebambe III, the Omukama of Bunyoro-Kitara Kingdom a powerful pre-colonial state in the Great Lakes region at that time. His mother was a lady of the Ababwiju clan.

In the 1820s, Kaboyo (later Olimi I) rebelled against his father and broke away from Bunyoro with loyal supporters to establish his own independent kingdom. This breakaway was the foundation of the Tooro Kingdom with Kaboyo as its first monarch.

According to historical tradition, Kaboyo began building his authority at Kaboyo around 1822, but the Kingdom's formal foundation is often dated about 1830. He refused the succession to the larger Bunyoro-Kitara throne upon his father's death, preferring to remain ruler of his new kingdom.

== Reign as King ==
Olimi I is credited with consolidating Tooro's territory and dynasty during his reign which lasted roughly from 1830 to about 1861. Under his leadership, the Tooro people solidified a separate identity from Bunyoro, a new royal lineage (Ababiito Ababoyo) was established which continues to provide the hereditary monarchs of Tooro. Local tradition holds that his rule was relatively stable and peaceful, laying the structural foundtaions for succession by his sons.

== Family and descendants ==
While detailed records of his marriages are scarce, most sources agree Olimi I fathered several children, many of whom played significant roles in Tooro's succession history. These include: Rukirabasaija Kazana Ruhaga I who succeeded him briefly, Rukirabasaija Kasunga Kyebambe Nyaika, later Omukama after a Palace coup.

== Death and legacy ==
Olimi I died around 1865 after more than three decades as ruler. He was buried at Kagoma near Kibiito in present day Bunyangabu District, a site considered historically important by the Tooro people. In recent years this burial ground has been under pressure from encroaching cultivation and settlement prompting cultural and heritage concerns.

Olimi's establishment of Tooro as a distinct Kingdom from Bunyoro marked a major historical moment in the region's political geography. Tooro went on to remain a significant Kingdom throughout the colonial era and into modern times, even after periods of abolition and restoration (1967-1993).

== Offspring ==
The offspring of Omukama Olimi I of Tooro included the following:

1. Prince (Omubiito) whose name is not known. This prince fathered a son, one Prince (Omubiito) Kabuzi, a nephew of Nyaika, assisted his uncle Mushaga I in his campaign to seize the throne. He was defeated and killed at Kanyanyange, together with a number of other princes in 1870. Prince Kabuzi fathered a son; Prince (Omubiito) Isansa.
2. Prince (Omubiito) Barongo.
3. Rukirabasaija Kazana Ruhaga, Omukama of Tooro, from 1862 until 1866.
4. Rukirabasaija Kasunga Kyebambe Nyaika, Omukama of Tooro, from 1866 until 1870 and from 1871 until 1872.
5. Rukirabasaija Kato Rukidi I, Omukama of Tooro, from 1871 until 1871.
6. Prince (Omubiito), whose name is also unknown. This unnamed prince II, fathered a son, Rukirabasaija Kakende Nyanuyonjo, Omukama of Tooro, who reigned from 1876 until 1876.
7. Prince (Omubiito) Kato.
8. Prince (Omubiito) Ndahura Mushaga. He rebelled against his brother Omukama Nyaika, but was defeated and killed, together with his nephew, Bulemu, in 1869.
9. Princess (Omubiitokati) Komuntale, Chiefess of Bulera.
10. Princess (Omubiitokati) Kibundabunda, Chiefess of Butanda.
11. Princess (Omubiitokati) Bayanjeru.

== The final days ==
Omukama Olimi I died around 1865

== See also ==
- Omukama of Tooro
- Tooro kingdom

Preceded by None	Omukama of Tooro; 1822–1865	Succeeded by Kazana Ruhaga
