= Ruhaga of Tooro =

King of Tooro from 1865 to 1866

Rukirabasaija Kazana Ruhaga was Omukama of the Tooro Kingdom, Uganda from around 1865-1866. He was the second (2nd) Omukama of Tooro and was a member of the Babiito dynasty. He was succeeded by Nyaika Kyebambe I who ruled from 1866-1871 during a significant period of political instability in the Bunyoro Kitara Empire.

== Claim to the throne ==
He was the third son of Olimi I of Tooro (Kaboyo Olimi I), Omukama of Tooro between 1822 and 1865. He ascended the throne upon the death of his father in 1865.

== The final years ==
Omukama Ruhaga was murdered on the orders of his brother, Kasunga Kyebambe Nyaika. Nyaika then seized the throne and became the Omukama.

== See also ==
- Omukama of Tooro
- Kayima of Buganda

Preceded by Kasusunkwanzi Olimi I	Omukama of Tooro; 1865–1866	Succeeded by Kasunga Kyebambe Nyaika
