= Rukidi I of Tooro =

King of Tooro in 1871

Rukirabasaija Kato Rukidi I (kajjaju) was Omukama of the Tooro Kingdom, in 1871. He was the fourth (4th) Omukama of Tooro.

== Biography ==
=== Claim to the throne ===
He was the fifth son of Rukirabasaija Kaboyo Omuhundwa Kasusunkwanzi Olimi I, the first Omukama of Tooro who reigned between 1822 and 1865. He rebelled against his elder brother, Kyebambe Nyaika in 1871, with the help of an invading army from Buganda. He seized the throne and Omukama Nyaika fled and went into hiding.

=== Reign ===
His reign was a very short one. Some accounts say it lasted only two months. He was deposed when his brother Kyebambe Nyaika returned to Tooro and reclaimed the throne.

Kato Rukidi 1 Rukirabasaija (Kajjaju) went to Masaka and he followed by his sister, he got a land in Bukakata kunya, nowadays called Bujjaju. After that he went to another place nowadays called Bwala hill and the people of Masaka called him Kajjaju, he started a new family at Bwala hill and this family Bwala mukirangira is still there.

Rukirabasaija kato Rukidi 1 people of Buganda call him Kajjaju; they named him Kajjaju because people used to ask him "wanja ndi masaka" and he replied them "kajjaju masaka muno" which means "naja njo masaka muno" (I came past days in Bush) and name masaka started their even the name. He costracted the new family in masaka nowadays calls Bwala hill Masaka city and after many years having grands he died. They buried him at Bwala hill near Bwala Masgd (amasiro ga Kato Rukidi1 Rukirabasaija Kajjaju )

== See also ==
- Omukama of Tooro
- Rukidi II of Tooro
- Rukidi III of Tooro

Preceded by Nyaika Kyebambe	Omukama of Tooro; 1871–1871	Succeeded by Nyaika Kyebambe
