= Rububi Kyebambe II of Tooro =

King of Tooro from 1875 to 1879

Rubuubi Kyebambe II was Omukama of Tooro Kingdom for two periods: first in 1875, and again from 1877 to 1879. He was the seventh Omukama (King) of Tooro.

== Reign ==
He was the fourth son of Kasunga Kyebambe Nyaika, Omukama of Tooro from 1866 until 1871 and from 1871 until 1872. He became Omukama following the abdication of his brother, Rukidi II, in 1875. However, later that year, the Tooro Kingdom was invaded by the Bunyoro Army under the command of Chief Kikukule of Bugangaizi. He fled to Buganda. Two years later, he returned and deposed his younger brother, Omukama Katera, in 1877. He ruled until he himself was deposed in 1879.

== The final years ==
Omukama Rububi Kyebambe II deposed by his younger brother, Rukirabasaija Kakende Nyamuyonjo, in 1879, with the support of the Buganda Army. It is not known where and how Omukama Rububi Kyebambe died or what caused his death.

== See also ==
- Omukama of Tooro

Preceded by Isingoma Rukidi II	Omukama of Tooro; 1875–1875	Succeeded by Kakende Nyamuyonjo

Preceded by Katera	Omukama of Tooro; 1877–1879	Succeeded by Kakende Nyamuyonjo
