= Kyebambe III of Tooro =

Daudi Kasagama Kyebambe III
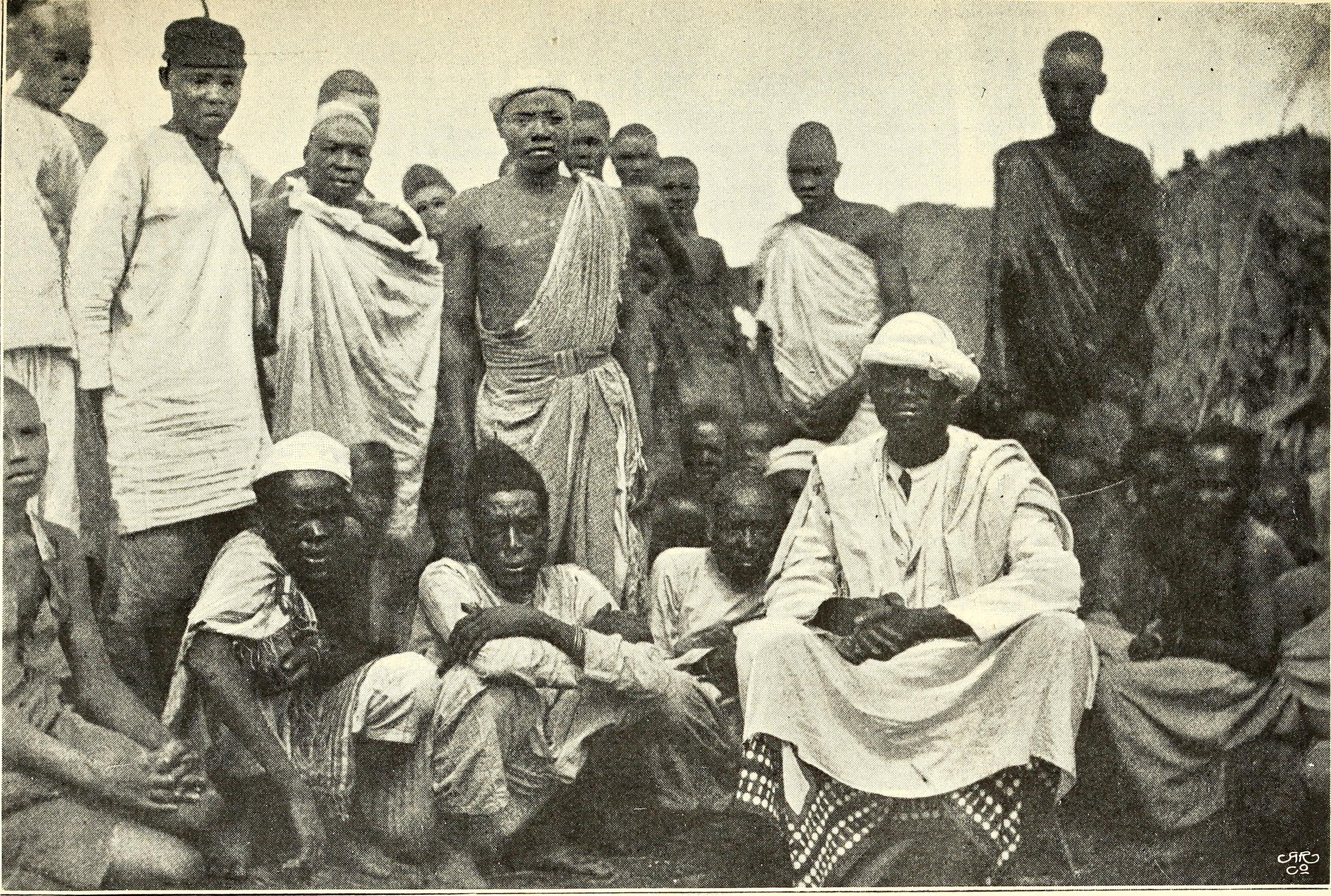
- Kasagama, Sultan of Toru, c. 1890

Omukama of Tooro
- Reign: 18 August 1891 – 31 December 1928
- Coronation: 16 March 1908, St John's Cathederal, Kabarole
- Predecessor: Olimi II
- Successor: Rukidi III
- Born: 1860; Royal Palace, Kabarole
- Died: 31 December 1928 (aged 68); Kyangabukama, Mwenge
- Burial: Karambi royal tombs (Ha'gasani)
- Consort: Omugo Adyeri Damali Tibaitwa (m. 1896)
- House: Biito-boyo
- Father: Olimi II
- Mother: Omugo Vikitoria Kahinju
- Religion: Anglican

Rukirabasaija Daudi Kasagama Kyebambe III was Omukama (King) of the Tooro Kingdom (one of the four traditional kingdoms located within the borders of what's today Uganda) from 1891 until 1928. He was the 10th Omukama of Tooro.

== Claim to the throne ==
He was the eldest surviving son of Rukirabasaija Nyaika Mukabirere Olimi II, the fifth (5th) Omukama of Toro, who reigned between 1872 and 1875. His mother was Vikitoria Kahinju. In 1875, following the death of his father, he fled with his mother and two brothers to Ankole. While there, his two elder brothers were murdered on the orders of the Queen Mother of Ankole, one by the name of Kiboga. He then took refuge in Buganda.

He signed a Treaty with the Imperial British East Africa Company (IBEAC), and was proclaimed at Kabarole, by Lord Lugard, August 14, 1891. He was installed as Omukama of Tooro on August 16, 1891, also at Kabarole.

== Married life ==
Omukama Kasagama Kyebambe IV married several wives according to ancient custom, but repudiated all of them, except his eleventh and favorite wife, whom he remarried according to Anglican rites at, St John's Cathedral, Kabarole, on May 4, 1896. Her name was Omugo Adyeri Damali Tibaitwa, the daughter of Nikodemo Kakurora, Chief of Kitagwenda.

=== Issue ===
Name	Birth	Death	Mother	Notes
Rukirabasaija Sir George David Matthew Kamurasi Rukidi III	6 March 1904	21 December 1965	Damali Tibaitwa	11th Omukama of Tooro
Professor Prince (Omubiito) Akiiki Hosea K. Nyabongo	1907	3 October 1975		Political activist and author
Prince (Omubiito) Akiiki John B. Rwakatale				
Prince (Omubiito) Amooti Keith Kagoro (Keesi Bahindi)				Omusuga of Rukidi III
Prince (Omubiito) Araali Switzer Rwaboni Kaijomurubi				
Prince (Omubiito) Adyeri Solomon Okwiri				
Prince (Omubiito) Atwooki Daniel. K. Ogene				Father of Ambassador Anne Katusiime Kageye, Uganda's Consul General in Arusha, Tanzania
Prince (Omubiito) Kiijanangoma				
Princess (Omubiitokati) Lusi			Damali Tibaitwa	
Princess (Omubiitokati) Ruth Komuntale	1900		Damali Tibaitwa	Batebe of Rukidi III
Princess (Omubiitokati) Abwooli Agnes Nkwenge Kakoko				Mother of politician and AIDS activist, Victoria Kakoko Sebagereka
Princess (Omubiitokati) Ada Nyamutoka				
Princess (Omubiitokati) Kabokya				
Prince (Omubiito) Adyeri Fredrick Rweru				
Princess (Omubiitokati) Abwooli Jeruline Mpanja				
Princess (Omubiitokati) Akiiki Juliana Komubaizi				
Prince ( Omubiito) Akiiki Charles Kimome				
Princess (Omubiitokati) Atwooki Evasta Masamba				
Princess (Omubiitokati) Abwooli Victoria Komukyeya				
Princess (Omubiitokati) Adyeri Beatrice Kabasweka				

== His reign ==
He converted to Christianity and was received into the Anglican Church. On March 15, 1896, he was baptized by Bishop Tucker, taking the name of Daudi (David). On March 16, 1908, he was crowned by the Reverend G.R. Blackledge at St. John's Cathedral, Kabarole. In 1918 he was made an honorary member of the Order of the British Empire for services in raising and organising native levies and local Defence Corps in the Uganda Protectorate.

== The final years ==
Omukama Kasagama Kyebambe III died at Kyangabukama, Mwenge on December 31, 1928.

== See also ==
- Omukama of Tooro

Preceded by Katera	Omukama of Tooro; 1891–1928	Succeeded by Kamurasi Rukidi III
