= Universal Ethiopian Students' Association =

- Abbreviation: UESA
- Formation: 1927 - 1948
- Purpose: Educate the African Diaspora about Ethiopianism and Pan-Africanism
- Headquarters: Harlem, NY.

The Universal Ethiopian Students' Association (UESA) was a political and intellectual organization formed by Black students and activists in 1927 based in Harlem, New York. The UESA focused on proliferating ideas of Pan-Africanism, anti-colonialism and the fight against Fascist Italy from 1927 to 1948. The UESA made significant contributions to educating the African diaspora within the United States and abroad regarding the movements of Ethiopianism, anti-colonialism and African unity.

== History ==
The main choice to use the term Universal Ethiopian Students' Association was derived not from the prevalence of Ethiopian students within the organization but from Ethiopian being "an identity label meaning universal black after Ethiopia defeated Italy in the 1896 battle at Adwa..."

A prominent part of the UESA was their newspaper titled The African: Journal of African Affairs. Through this publication they were able to share stories of Africa's past, spread ideas aligning with their goals and even host public debates with other Harlem-based literary clubs. Further contributions of the UESA to the African diaspora included fundraising for African education, planning National Ethiopian Weeks and working with other movements to oppose imperialist narratives.

=== History of Ethiopianism ===
Map of Ethiopia in Africa

Ethiopianism has historically referred to a concept that promoted Black resistance, African pride and "served as a source of identity in the Black World." The origins of Ethiopianism (separate from Ethiopian Nationalism) lie in the resistance of the state of Ethiopia during the reign of Italian colonization and imperialism.

==== Ethiopia's Fight to Maintain Independence ====
The invasion of Ethiopia occurred on Oct 3, 1935, when the Fascist Italian Leader, Benito Mussolini, began to invade the sovereign state under the mission of expanding Italy's colonial holdings. Mussolini conducted this invasion despite Ethiopia being a sovereign nation recognized by the League of Nations.

Mussolini sought to build Italy's colonial possessions, their first colony was founded in 1890 and named Eritrea. Italy had issues within their state such as widespread illiteracy and a corrupt political class. In an act to cement itself as an International power, Italy attempted to invade Ethiopia.

The First Italo-Ethiopian War began in 1895 and was punctuated by the Battle of Adwa in 1896. The war ended wth Italy's defeat as they had severely underestimated Ethiopia's military strength.

In 1926, approximately 30 years after the first invasion, Mussolini gave a speech in Tripoli, a previous Italian colony in Libya, where he detailed his mission to expand in the Mediterranean and East. In the following years, Italy’s Ministry for the Colony actively multiplied its propagandist efforts in favour of colonialism, infiltrating nearly “every major newspaper, periodical, magazine and children’s publication in Italy.” Shortly thereafter, the UESA was formed and sought to combat the kind of propaganda distributed by Italy.

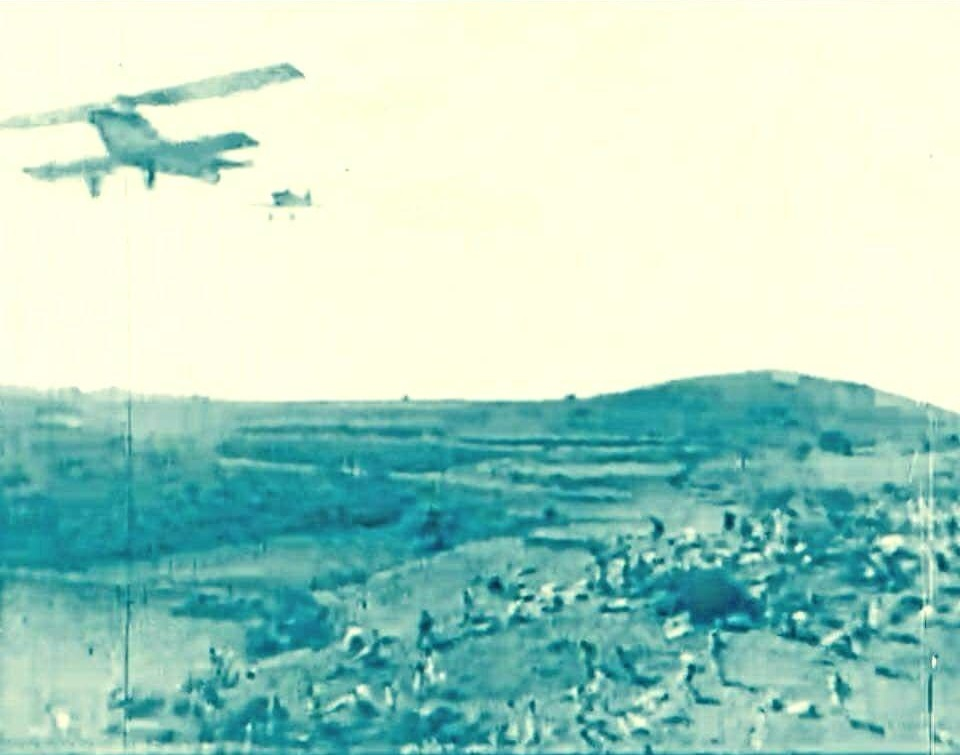
Second Italo-Ethiopian War

On December 5, 1934, Italian troops at Ual-Ual, a region along the Ethiopia-Somalia border, clashed with Ethiopian forces trying to reclaim occupied land. Mussolini used this minor incident as an excuse to launch his invasion of Ethiopia. In this Second Italo-Ethiopian War, Ethiopia was unable to compete against the technologically advanced Italian army and fell under temporary colonial occupation.

==== War Development and Effects on Pan-Africanism ====
For many historians, the Ethiopian Wars are core events in the larger history of Pan-Africanism, it has been referred to as the "single most important event in black internationalism."

The engagement of Black communities around the world about the issue of Ethiopia was sparked by the wars being an "explicit breach of the principles underlying the League of Nations" because Italy had invaded a sovereign state. Black activists and intellectuals expressed that the invasion was a "betrayal of a black nation by its white so-called allies in the League of Nations," illustrated by the lack of support of other predominantly white states within the League of Nations.

The threat to Ethiopia's independence as a member of the League of Nations prompted an outpouring of support and connection to the sovereign Black nation. Ethiopianism as a movement found its roots in the Italo-Ethiopian Wars.

== Origins ==
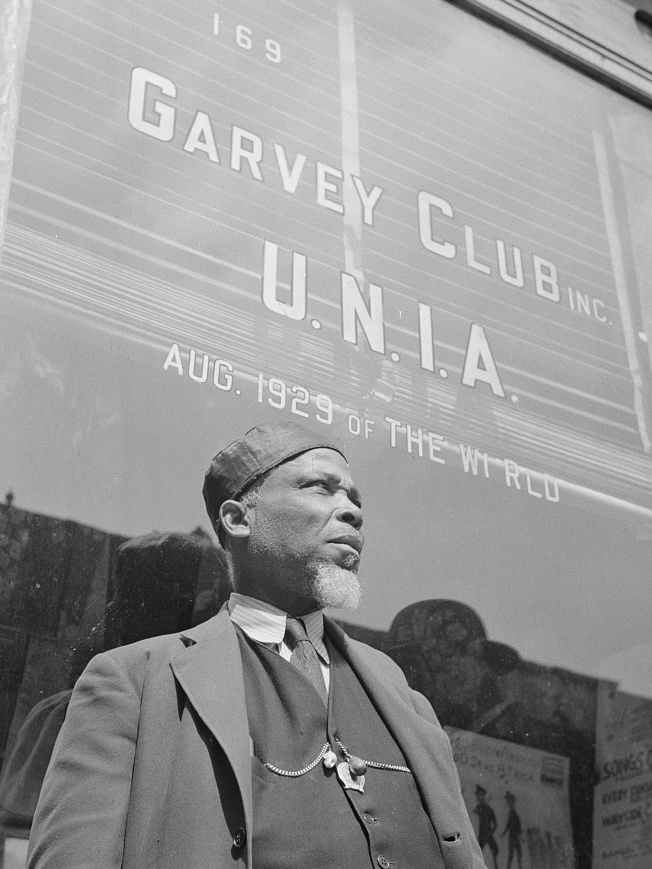
Image of UNIA "Garvey Club" Member

Some of the founding members of the UESA had previously been involved in the Universal Negro Improvement Association (UNIA). Marcus Garvey, a Jamaican-born Black nationalist, Pan-Africanist, and political leader, founded the UNIA. Garvey was fuelled by his concept of “Garveyism,” which called for Africa to be a self-governing, economically independent homeland. He stressed the oppressive conditions experienced under colonial rule, such as Ethiopia under Italian occupation, and urged collective action to uplift Black people around the world.

Inspired by Garvey’s ideas, Black students in Harlem sought to create their own organization to support Pan-Africanism and the fight against colonial powers. In 1927, they formed the Universal Ethiopian Students’ Club, later known as the Universal Ethiopian Students’ Association (UESA), in Harlem, New York.

== Prominent Members of the UESA ==
James L. Brown:

- A founding member of the UESA who was an active proponent of “Garveyism” and the UNIA. He became UESA's president in 1932.

A. Balfour Linton:

- A founding member of the UESA and an African History and Language professor. He would go on to become the editor of The African: Journal of African Affairs.

Louis Austin:

- A founding member and Black activist from North Carolina. After finishing university, Austin took out a loan from one of Durham's only black-owned banks, Mechanic and Farmers Bank, and bought a newspaper called The Carolina Times where he was an outspoken voice for Black North Carolinians in the twentieth-century.
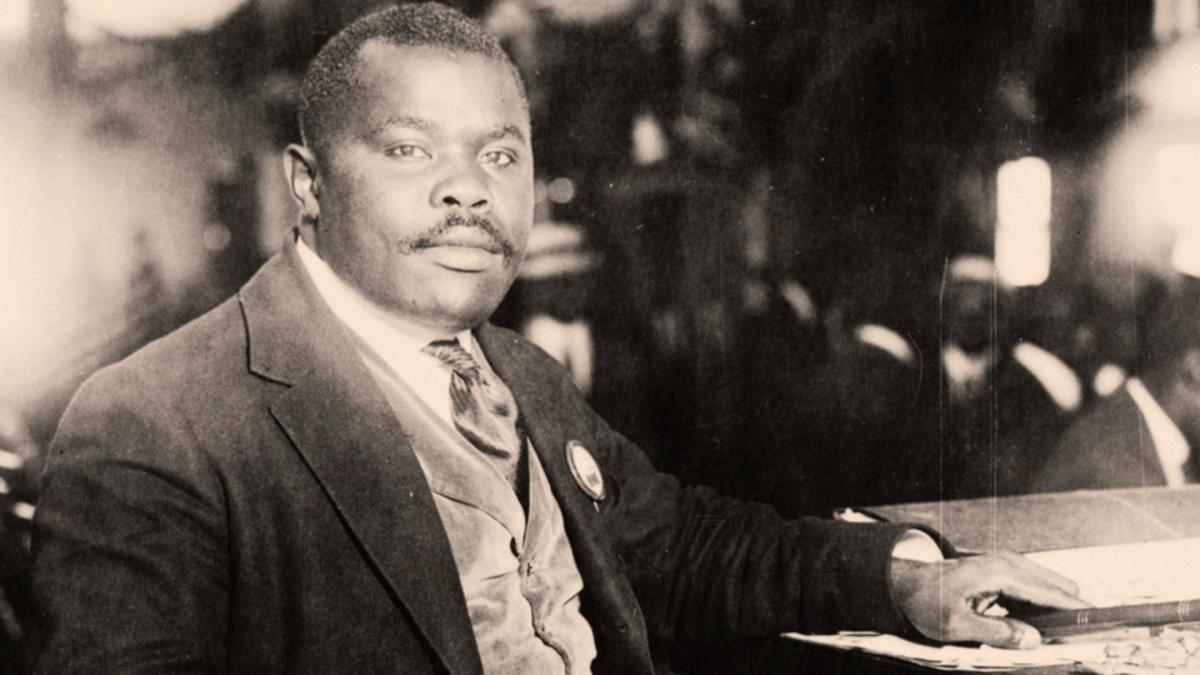
  Marcus Garvey

Marcus Garvey:

- A Jamaican-born political leader, publisher, journalist, and public speaker who founded the Universal Negro Improvement Association (UNIA), advocating for Pan-Africanism and African self-determination. Garvey’s teachings of economic independence, Black pride, and resistance to colonial oppression drove many of the initiatives of the UESA.
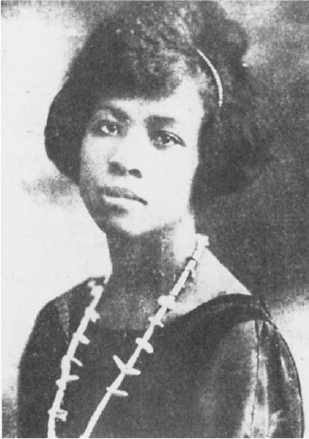
  Amy Jacques Garvey

Amy Jaques Garvey:

- A Jamaican-born Pan-Africanist, journalist, and activist who was known as the partner of Marcus Garvey. She supported similar Pan-African movements at the time such as the New Negro Movement and Garvey’s UNIA. During the Ethiopian-Italian War of Independence, Amy became an associate editor of the UESA’s journal, the African.

== UESA's Activism During The 2nd Italo-Ethiopian War ==
October 20, 1935: The USEA collaborated with a local Communist-led National Students League to educate the public about colonialism. The two organizations set up a mock trial, one in June 1935 and another in October 1935. The mock trial was titled Africa vs. the Imperialist Powers, and was held at Abyssinian Baptist Church. The goal was to educate the public about how European empires continued to control African nations, like Ethiopia.

July 22, 1936: The UESA supported Ethiopia in the Ethiopian-Italian War and created a booklet titled The Truth About Ethiopia. This book acted as a fundraiser to provide accurate information about the conflict between Ethiopia and Italy in the midst of misinformation popularized by Mussolini.

July 22, 1936: The UESA established the Educational Fund at Dunbar National Bank in Harlem. The fund was designed to build schools in Africa, starting in Liberia, provide scholarships for students, and send teachers to support education efforts in a region that would not receive educational instruction otherwise.

December 1–8, 1936: The UESA held various events, like National Ethiopian Week, which featured two main activities: Ethiopian history classes and a fundraising dance to support Ethiopia’s ongoing resistance. Their fundraising efforts allowed them to donate $5000 to the resistance cause in Ethiopia.

== The African: Journal of African Affairs ==
The UESA established a journal or publication titled The African: Journal of African Affairs. The primary incentive to publish this journal was to proliferate ideas of Ethiopianism, anti-colonial resistance and Black Nationalism to the African Diaspora in the United States.

The title of the journal was of significance to the founders as the term The African emphasizes that the term “Negro” was entirely coined by imperialists to describe more than 400 million Africans with unique national characteristics that cannot be accurately represented. This linguistic change was meant to not only a challenge to the colonial discourse system, but also to reshape the African national identity, aimed at enhancing the sense of belonging and national pride of the African diaspora.

=== Specific Contributors to The African: Journal of African Affairs ===
==== Anti-colonialism ====
George Padmore, a journalist and author, contributed to the journal with an article title "Native Problems in North Africa." In this article, Padmore looked cases in North Africa where Africans were discriminated against under French colonial rule. Padmore first discussed Algeria where French white settlers, known as Colons, were “regarded as full citizens of the republic” while the native Africans held “no political representation.” Though some Algerians had some representation in the French government—like “nine members of the Chamber of Deputies” and “three to the Senate”—Padmore explains that the majority of native Africans, like “workers, peasants, and tribesmen,” had no direct representation in Algeria’s national, regional, and local governments.

George Schuyler, another African editor of the 1943 journal of The African, published a separate article detailing the anti-imperialist protests that began happening in the South of Africa. Schuyler wrote about a protest that played in May 1943 in Pretoria, South Africa, where a crowd of “Africans [attempted to] stage a strike for fair labor wages.” Africans had been promised to get a pay raise of 25 shillings a week (only 4 shillings a day!) as their white counterparts received a raise from “20 to 30 shillings a day.” However, not only were they denied the raise but 17 African protestors were killed and 100 wounded.

By publishing these articles The African attempted to highlight stories of oppression and the resulting opposition of African peoples and specifically colonial subjects.

==== African History ====
Writers for the UESA’s journal, The African, focused on articles that aimed to glorify and praise Africa’s history and culture to support the broader Pan-African identity.

In August 1944, Theodile Cyril (T. C.) Murray, began writing about the notable government and naval structures that Africa had in its past. In Murray’s article, he argues that many modern government structures had been developed based on the African “blueprint" developing one of the first forms of a “republic form of government, with two houses similar to the House of Assembly [in London] and the House of Representatives in the United States.”

The Journal had international reach, a section titled 'Readers Opinion' "revealed that the readership spanned from the United States, British West Indies, and Africa, covering the “working class to middle-class, rural and urban, male, female, black, white, pastors, students and academicians, and activists etc.”

== Legacy ==
=== The African: Journal of African Affairs ===
The UESA made contributions to the anti-colonial movement in the United States during the twentieth century. The UESA did important mobilization work within Harlem but also reached far broader audiences with the publication of their journal, The African. The UESA was among the first Black-led organizations and publications to spread the ideas of Ethiopianism in the United States.

=== Impact Beyond 1948 ===
Although the organization and paper ended in 1948, their legacy was ongoing. Many readers worldwide praised the editors for their willingness to help Africans in the anti-colonial fight and to unite people of African descent globally.

=== UESA and the United Nations ===
The UESA may have contributed to the anti-colonial movement within the Founding Conference of the United Nations in 1945. The UESA announced in The African that they were to submit a proposal to the Conference regarding African independence and decolonization. However, it is unknown whether this proposal was submitted to the Conference. The UESA contributed to the dispersal of anti-colonial and pro-African messaging during the years before and after the Founding Conference of the United Nations.

=== Activism in the South ===
Many members of the UESA went on to continue the fight against imperial powers and encourage others to join the cause. Louis Austin, a prominent member of the UESA, went on to purchase a newspaper and rename it The Carolina Times. Austin was an advocate for desegregation during the Great Depression and was perhaps the “foremost advocate for racial justice” during this time. Moreover, The Carolina Times was among the first southern newspapers to promote equal education for black and white children. Austin published articles directly detailing the funding disparities of black and white schools.

=== Impact ===
The modern version of Ethiopianism is linked to the Pan-African movement and especially the events and organizations of the early twentieth century. While it is difficult to quantify the effect of the UESA and specifically The African: Journal of African Affairs on the anti-colonial movement and the civil rights movement in the United States, this organization contributed to the growing awareness of these movements.

Published within The African: Journal of African Affairs were responses from readers worldwide:

1. Richardson from Brooklyn, NY praised the journal for being a “ ‘new hope toward shaping the course of freedom and independence for the scattered sons and daughters of Africa throughout the world.’"
2. G. M. Yekele, a South African mine worker in Lyndenburg noted “ ‘I cannot tell you how happy I am to say that the plight, aim, hope of us in South Africa is of concern and action to and by our brothers across the seas.’ ”
3. James R. Lawson in Hawkinsville, Georgia discusses the Pan-African focused journal living in the US south. He states “ ‘ Living here in the South, especially in the rural district, it surprises me how keen the interest of these people are in the future of Africa and the people of African descent.’ ”
