= Olimi II of Tooro =

King of Tooro from 1872 to 1875

Rukirabasaija Kasunga Nyaika Kyebambe l was Omukama of the Tooro Kingdom, from 1872 until 1875. He was the fifth (5th) Omukama of Tooro.

== Background ==
The Kingdom of Tooro emerged in the sixteenth century as a breakaway state from the larger Bunyoro-Kitara kingdom. It was founded by members of the Babiito dynasty, which claimed descent from the rulers of Bunyoro and provided Tooro with its early monarchs.

The regnal name Olimi was borne by several kings of Tooro, and numerical distinctions are used by modern historians to differentiate them.

== Claim to the throne ==
He was the eldest son of Kaboyo Olimi l, Omukama of Tooro, who reigned between 1866 and 1871 and between 1871 and 1872. It is not known who his mother was. He ascended to the throne following the death of his father in 1872.

== Married life ==
The wives of Omukama Olimi II included:

- Vikitoria Kahinju, of the Ababopi clan, sister of Togwe Rusoke, sometime Prime Minister of Tooro.

== Offspring ==
The children of Omukama Olimi II included:

1. Rukirabasaija Daudi Kasagama Kyebambe III, Omukama of Toro, who reigned between 1891 and 1928, whose mother was Vikitoria Kahinju.
2. Prince (Omubiito) Musuga. He fled to Ankole where he was murdered on the orders of Kiboga, the Queen Mother of Ankole.
3. Prince (Omubiito) Kamurasi. He fled to Ankole where he was murdered on the orders of Kiboga, the Queen Mother of Ankole.
4. Prince (Omubiito) Zedekiya Nkojo.
5. Princess (Omubiitokati) Mukakiyabara Maliza Bagaya Rwigirwa. She was installed as the Batebe to her brother Daudi Kasagama Kyebambe III, on August 16, 1891. In 1871, she married Rukirabasaija Agutamba Chwa II Kabarega, Omukama of Bunyoro-Kitara who was born in 1853. Daudi Agutamba Chwa was the second son of Rukirabasaija Agutamba Kyebambe IV Kamurasi, Omukama of Bunyoro-Kitara.
6. Princess (Omubiitokati) Lilian Nyinabarongo.
7. Princess (Omubiitokati) Leya Kakura.
8. A daughter, whose name is not given, who in 1871 married Nyakusinga Rubambansi Mutambuka, the Omugabe of Ankole at that time.

== His reign ==
In 1875, Omukama Olimi II was captured and deported to Bunyoro by an army sent by Omukama Chwa II Kabarega. He escaped when British and Buganda forces invaded Bunyoro in 1893/1894. However, he died before he was able to return to the Tooro Kingdom.

== The final years ==
Omukama Kyebambe Olimi II died in Buganda in 1894.

== See also ==
- Omukama of Tooro

Preceded by Nyaika Kyebambe	Omukama of Tooro; 1872–1875	Succeeded by Isingoma Rukidi II
