= Tooro Kingdom =

Bantu kingdom in mid-western Uganda

Kingdom of Tooro Obukama bwa Tooro (Tooro)
- Flag Coat of arms
- Anthem: "Agutamba"
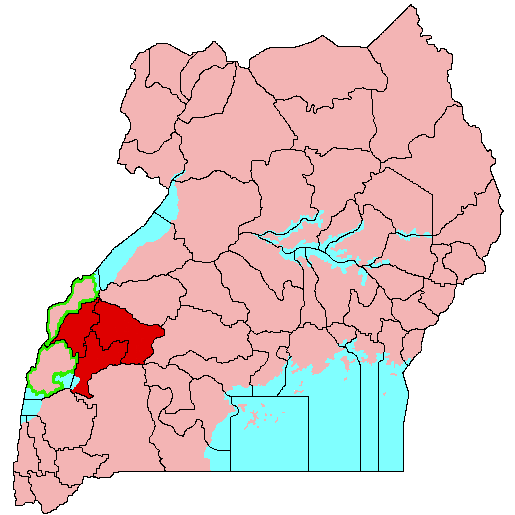
- Location of Tooro (red) in Uganda (pink).
- Status: Traditional kingdom
- Capital and largest city: Fort Portal
- Official languages: Rutooro, English
- Rutooro: Rutooro
- Ethnic groups: many ethnicities but the indigenous are; Batooro, Bakonzo, Babwisi, Bamba, Batuku and Songora
- Demonym: Tooro
- Government: Constitutional monarchy
  - Monarch: Edward Rukidi Nyabongo I
  - Prime Minister: Calvin Armstrong Rwomiire Akiiki
- Legislature: Orukurato Orukuru

Independence
  - from the Kingdom of Bunyoro: 1830, 1876
  - Monarchy abolished: 1967
  - Monarchy restored: 1993
- Currency: Ugandan shilling
- Time zone: UTC+3 (EAT)
- Calling code: 256

Tooro
- Person: Omutooro
- People: Abatooro
- Language: Orutooro
- Country: Obukama bwa Tooro

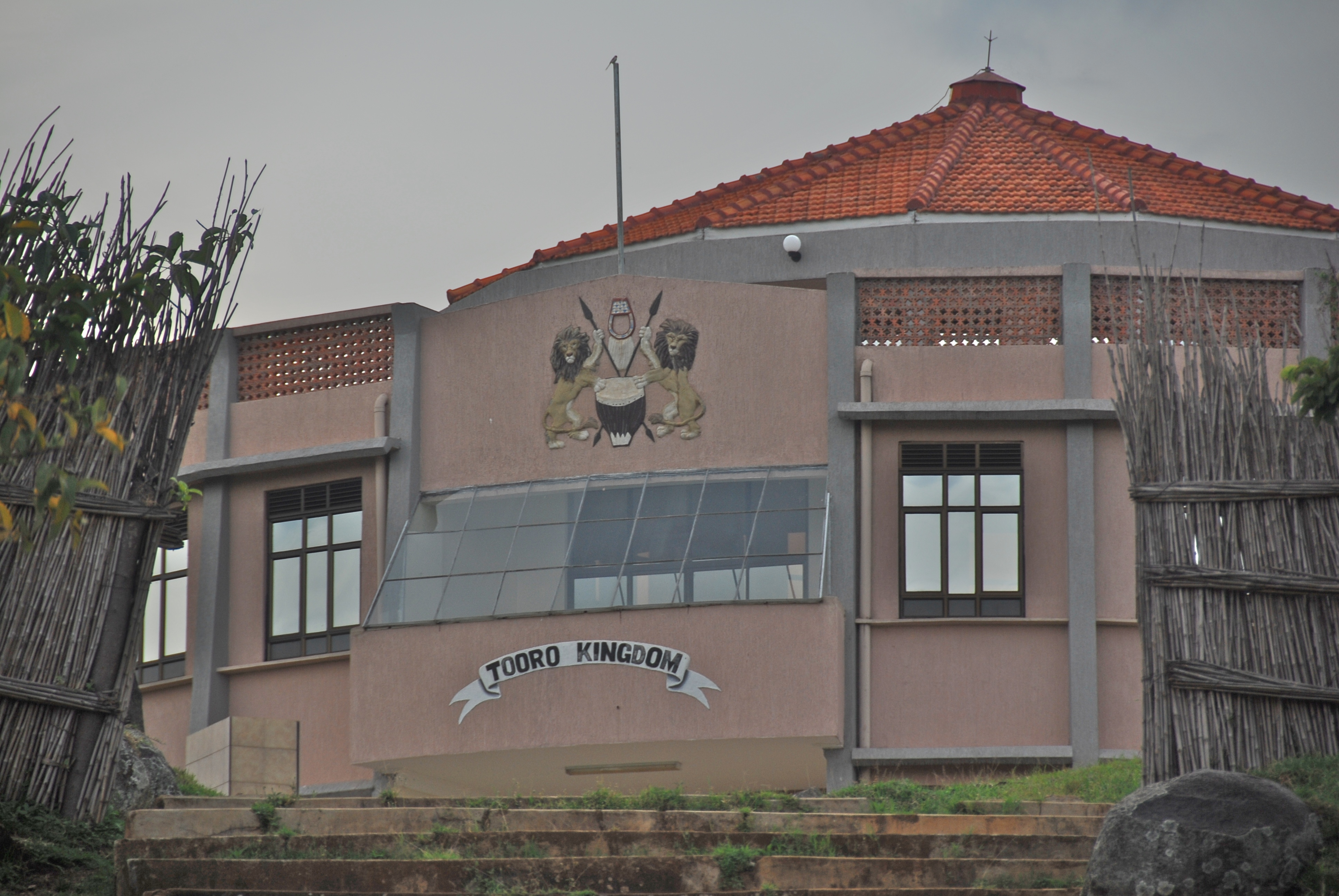
Tooro Palace

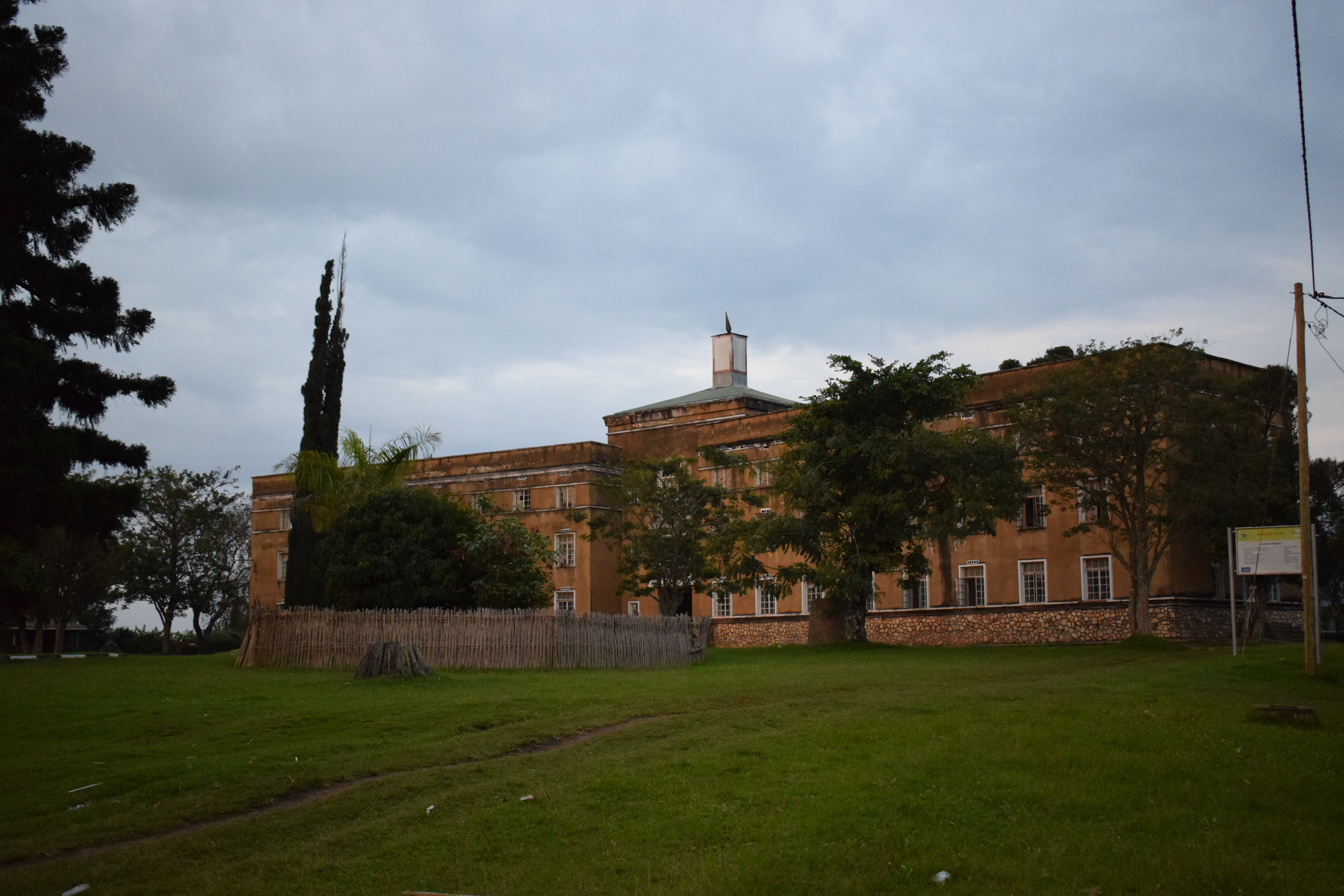
Parliament of Tooro Kingdom

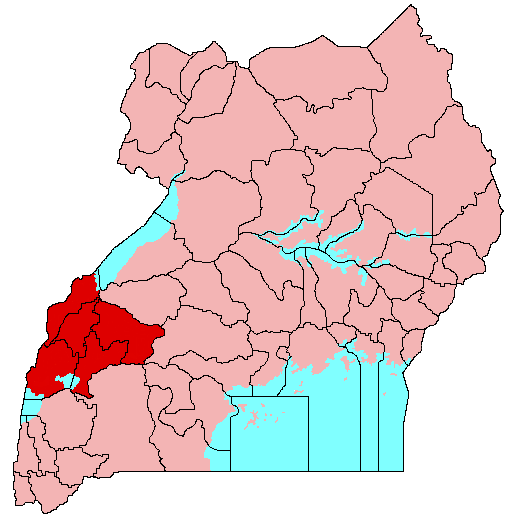
The original Kingdom of Tooro (red) and its districts. Lakes Albert and Victoria and other bodies of water are shaded blue.

The Tooro Kingdom is one of the 17 recognised traditional kingdoms located within the borders of Uganda.

The people native to the kingdom are the Batooro, and their language is likewise called Rutooro. The Batooro and those of the neighbouring kingdom of Bunyoro, speak the Runyoro/Rutooro dialect of the Runyakitara language and share a similar background and cultural traits. The Batooro live on Uganda's western border, south of Lake Albert.

== History ==
The Tooro Kingdom evolved out of a breakaway segment of Bunyoro sometime before the nineteenth century. It was founded in 1830 when Omukama Kaboyo Olimi I, the eldest son of Omukama of Bunyoro Nyamutukura Kyebambe III of Bunyoro, seceded and established his own independent kingdom. Absorbed into Bunyoro-Kitara in 1876, it reasserted its independence in 1891.

In 1967, with the ratification of the Third constitution of Uganda, Tooro's monarchy was abolished, alongside the monarchies of Bunyoro, Buganda, Ankole, and Busoga, but was reinstated in 1993.

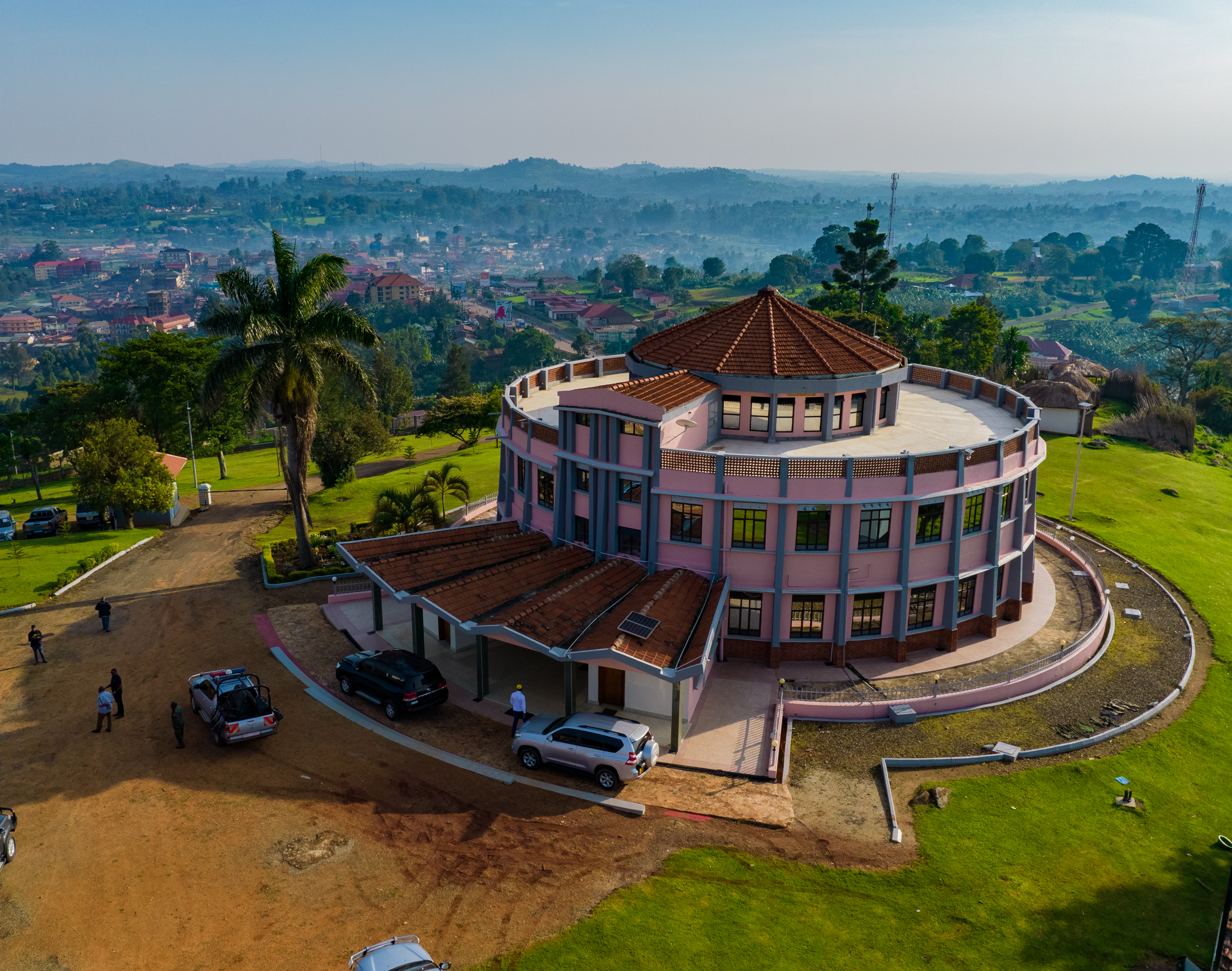
The Tooro Palace at Karuzika Hill overlooking Fort Portal Town

== Cultural influence ==
The Austrian painter Friedensreich Hundertwasser (1928–2000) spent some time there in the 1960s where he painted a number of works and named them after the kingdom.

The Batooro people have a strong culture but similar in stratification to Banyoro. They have a strong cultural naming system (PET NAME) known as Empaako. With the Empaako naming system, children are given one of twelve names shared across the communities in addition to their given and family names. Addressing someone by his or her Empaako is a positive affirmation of cultural ties. It can be used as a form of greeting or a declaration of affection, respect, honour or love.

Use of Empaako can defuse tension or anger and sends a strong message about social identity and unity, peace and reconciliation. The Empaako names are: Amooti, Abooki, Akiiki, Ateenyi, Adyeeri, Atwooki, Abwooli, Araali, Acaali, Bbala, and Okaali.

== Abakama ba Tooro (Kings of Tooro) ==
The following is a list of the Abakama of Tooro since 1800:

1. Olimi I: 1822–1865
2. Ruhaga of Tooro: 1865–1866
3. Nyaika Kyebambe I: 1866–1871 and 1871–1872
4. Rukidi I: 1871
5. Olimi II: 1872–1875
6. Rukidi II: 1875–1875
7. Rububi Kyebambe II: 1875 and 1877–1879
8. Kakende Nyamuyonjo: 1875–1876 and 1879–1880
9. Katera: 1876–1877
  1. Interregnum, reverted to Bunyoro: 1880–1891
10. Kyebambe III: 1891–1928
11. Rukidi III: 1929–1965
12. Olimi III: 1965–1967 and 1993–1995
  1. in pretence: 1967–1993 (monarchy abolished)
13. Rukidi IV: 1995–2026
14. Nyabongo I, September 2026–present.

== See also ==
- Omukama of Tooro
- Omukama of Bunyoro
- Bunyoro Kingdom
- Princess Elizabeth of Tooro

== Bibliography ==
- Ingham, Kenneth. The Kingdom of Toro in Uganda. London: Methuen, 1975.
