= Kakende of Tooro =

King of Tooro from 1875 to 1880

Kakende Nyamuyonjo

Omukama of Tooro
- Reign: 1875–1876 and 1879–1880
- Predecessor: Rububi Kyebambe II (1875) Rukidi II (1879)
- Successor: Katera (1876) Interregnum (1880)
- Born: Unknown; Tooro Kingdom
- Died: before 1885; Buganda
- House: Biito-boyo
- Father: Kasunga Kyebambe Nyaika
- Mother: Unknown

Rukirabasaija Kakende Nyamuyonjo was Omukama of the Tooro Kingdomfrom 1875 until 1876 and from 1879 until 1880. He was the eighth (8th) Omukama of Tooro.

== Married life ==
married Logose a musoga from the baise igaga Clan

== Offspring ==
Omukama Kakende fathered three children with his wife logose namely;- one son Katunku Zephania and two daughters Bulage and Mpindi.

== His reign ==
1875–1876 and 1879–1880 Omukama Kakende was raised to the throne in 1875 following the flight of his older brother, Rububi Kyebambe II, with the help of an invading army from Buganda. However, when the army left the Tooro Kingdom in 1876, Omukama Kakende left with them. He returned with another army from Buganda in 1879 and deposed his brother Rububi Kyebambe II. He ruled until 1880.

== The final years ==
In 1880, the Tooro Kingdom was invaded by an army from Bunyoro. The invaders expelled Omukama Kakende, who first took refuge in Ankole and later in Buganda. Omukama Kakende died from smallpox in Buganda, prior to 1885. He was buried at Busimba Zone, Mpogo, Sironko District.

== See also ==
- Omukama of Tooro

Preceded by Rububi Kyebambe II	Omukama of Tooro; 1875–1876	Succeeded by Katera

Preceded by Rububi Kyebambe II	Omukama of Tooro; 1879–1880	Succeeded by Daudi Kasagama Kyebambe III
