= Ramy Akiki =

Lebanese basketball player (born 1982)

Champville SC
- Position: Point guard
- League: Lebanese Basketball League

Personal information
- Born: December 24, 1982 (age 43) Beirut, Lebanon
- Listed height: 6 ft 1 in (1.85 m)
- Listed weight: 178 lb (81 kg)

Career information
- Playing career: 2004–present

Ramy Akiki (born 24 December 1982) is a Lebanese basketball player with Champville SC of the Lebanese Basketball League. He played year 2002–03 with American college team Cypress JC for a one-year before moving to Lebanese division 2 side Blue Stars in the 2003–04 season. In the 2004–05 season Ramy had been promoted to the Lebanese Basketball League as a result of his performance with Blue Stars and was additionally signed by Lebanese powerhouse Sporting Al Riyadi Beirut for one season. he was then waved the next year in order to join Tripoli Al Mouttahed Tripoli from 2004 to 2007 on a three-year contract. By then he was promoted back to the division level playing with Jounieh side Chehab from 2008 to 2011.
