= Nyamutukura Kyebambe III of Bunyoro =

Ugandan traditional leader from 1786 to 1835

Omukama Nyamutukura Kyebambe III ruled Bunyoro (part of modern-day Uganda) from 1786 to 1835. In 1822, his eldest son rebelled and established his own independent kingdom, the Tooro Kingdom.
