= Omukama of Tooro =

Title of the king of Tooro, Uganda

- Omukama wa Tooro
- Coat of arms of Tooro

Incumbent
- Nyabongo I since 12 September 2026

Details
- Style: His Majesty
- First monarch: Olimi I
- Formed: 1830
- Residences: Karuziika Palace, Fort Portal

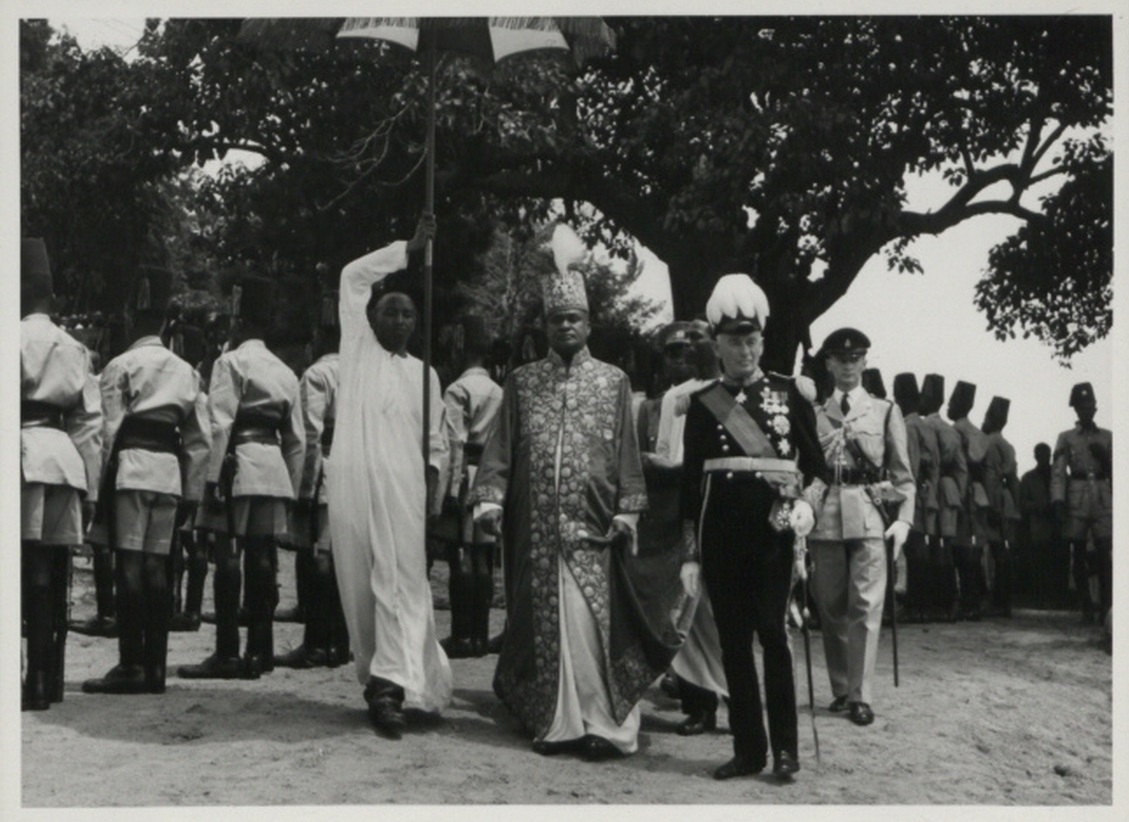
The Omukama of Tooro, Rukidi III (centre) and the British governor of Uganda, Sir Frederick Crawford (right) at the signing of an agreement in Kabarole, Tooro Kingdom, Uganda, late 1950s.

Omukama wa Tooro (translates to the King of Tooro) is the official title given to the king of Tooro in Uganda. Ugandan kingdoms currently function "more as cultural institutions than political powers".

== History ==
The history of Omukama wa Tooro starts with the kingdom's founding around 1830s by Rukirabasaija Omukama Kaboyo Olimi l Amooti who was the son of Rukirabasaija Kyebambe lll Nyamutukura Amooti, the king of Bunyoro. He broke away and formed his own independent kingdom, establishing the Tooro monarchy, continuing the ancient Babiito dynasty linked to the legendary Kitara empire with earlier legendary rulers like the Tembuzi and Chwezi. In the late 1880s the Bunyoro King, Kabarenga temporarily reconquered the Tooro. However, with help from the British colonizers the Tooro prince restored his throne in the 1890s.

In the 1950s, the Uganda National Congress supported the Omukama as he resisted the Central Government's efforts to "rule" Tooro as a district.

Tooro existed as an independent kingdom until 1967 when Apollo Milton Obote banned all kingdoms in Uganda. The kingdoms were reinstated as cultural institutions in 1993.

== Election of kings ==
Tooro kingdom runs a hereditary system of succession, and the successor is determined by royal lineage.

== Current kingship ==
The most recent Omukama of Tooro is Edward Rukidi Nyabongo I, who ascended the throne in 2026. He is the 14th ruler of this kingdom, which originated as a secession from Bunyoro Kingdom.

== List of Abakama ba (Kings of) Tooro ==
The following is a list of the Abakama of Tooro:

No.	Name	Reign	Notes
1	Kaboyo Omuhundwa Kasusunkwanzi Olimi I	1822–1861	Founder and first Omukama
2	Kazana Ruhaga I	1861–1866	Killed by his brother Nyaika
3	Nyaika Kasunga Kyebambe I	1866–1871	1st time
4	Kato Rukidi I	1871	
5	Nyaika Kasunga Kyebambe I	1871–1872	2nd time
6	Nyaika Mukabirere Olimi II	1872–1875	
7	Rukidi II	1875	
8	Rubuubi Kyebambe II	1875	1st time
9	Kakende Nyanuyonjo	1875–1876	1st time
10	Katera	1876–1877	
11	Rubuubi Kyebambe II	1877–1879	2nd time
12	Kakende Nyanuyonjo	1879–1880	2nd time; Interregnum under Bunyoro rule followed Kakende's reign, lasting from 1880 to 1891
13	Kyebambe III	1891–1928	
14	George David Matthew Kamurasi Rukidi III	1928–1965	
15	Patrick David Matthew Kaboyo (Rwamuhokya) Olimi III	1965–1995	Son of Rukidi III. Monarchy abolished by the Ugandan government between 1967 and 1993
16	Oyo Nyimba Kabamba Iguru Rukidi IV	1995–2026	Son of Olimi III
17	Edward Rukidi Nyabongo I	2026–present	Grandson of George Rukidi III

== See also ==
- Omukama of Bunyoro
- Kabaka of Buganda
- Tooro Kingdom
- Omugabe of Ankole
- Omukama
